= Sherrard Falls =

- Location within New South Wales
- Location: New England, New South Wales, Australia
- Coordinates: 30°22′55″S 152°44′05″E
- Type: Cascade
- Watercourse: unnamed stream

The Sherrard Falls is a cascade waterfall on an unnamed stream that is located in the New England region of New South Wales, Australia.

== Location and features ==
The waterfall is situated adjacent to the Waterfall Way between the town of Dorrigo and the locality of Thora, in the Dorrigo National Park. It is around 7 kilometres (4.3 mi) from the town of Dorrigo and around 1 kilometre (0.62 mi) from the Newell Falls. The bridge across Sherrard Falls is one lane. Vehicular and pedestrian access and viewing of the Sherrard Falls is difficult due to no car parking on the narrow Waterfall Way. The Waterfall Way is subject to closure at Sherrard Falls and Newell Falls in times of high rain, due to flooding over the road.

== See also ==
- List of waterfalls
- List of waterfalls in Australia
