= Wongalee Falls =

- Location within Queensland
- Location: Far North Queensland, Australia
- Coordinates: 16°57′48″S 145°40′04″E
- Elevation: 301 metres (988 ft) AHD
- Total height: 58–81 metres (190–266 ft)
- Number of drops: 1
- Watercourse: Freshwater Creek

The Wongalee Falls, a waterfall on the Freshwater Creek, is located in the UNESCO World Heritage–listed Wet Tropics in the Far North region of Queensland, Australia.

The falls are a part of the Crystal Cascades found near the head of the, downstream from Milmilgee Falls, northwest of Cairns near Redlynch.

== See also ==
- List of waterfalls
- List of waterfalls in Australia
