= First Falls =

First Falls may refer to:

- Yalesville, Connecticut, a village in Wallingford, Connecticut, formerly known as First Falls
- First Falls (Adelaide Hills, South Australia), a plunge waterfall
- First Falls (City of Burnside, South Australia), a cascade waterfall
- First Falls (Yarmouth, Maine), a waterfall
