= Horse tail =

Horse tail, horsetail or horse's tail may refer to:

- the tail of a horse
- Equisetidae, a subclass of living and extinct plants known as horsetails
  - Equisetales, the single extant order of Equisetidae
    - Equisetaceae, the horsetail family, the only extant family of Equisetales
      - Equisetum, horsetail, the only living genus in Equisetaceae
- Cauda equina ('horse's tail'), a bundle of spinal nerves and spinal nerve rootlets in humans
- a type of waterfall

== See also ==
- Horsetail Falls (disambiguation)
- Hippuris, or mare's tail, a flowering plant
- Ponytail, a human hairstyle
- Tug (banner), a pole with circularly-arranged horse tail hairs, historically flown by Turkic tribes
