= List of waterfalls in Australia =

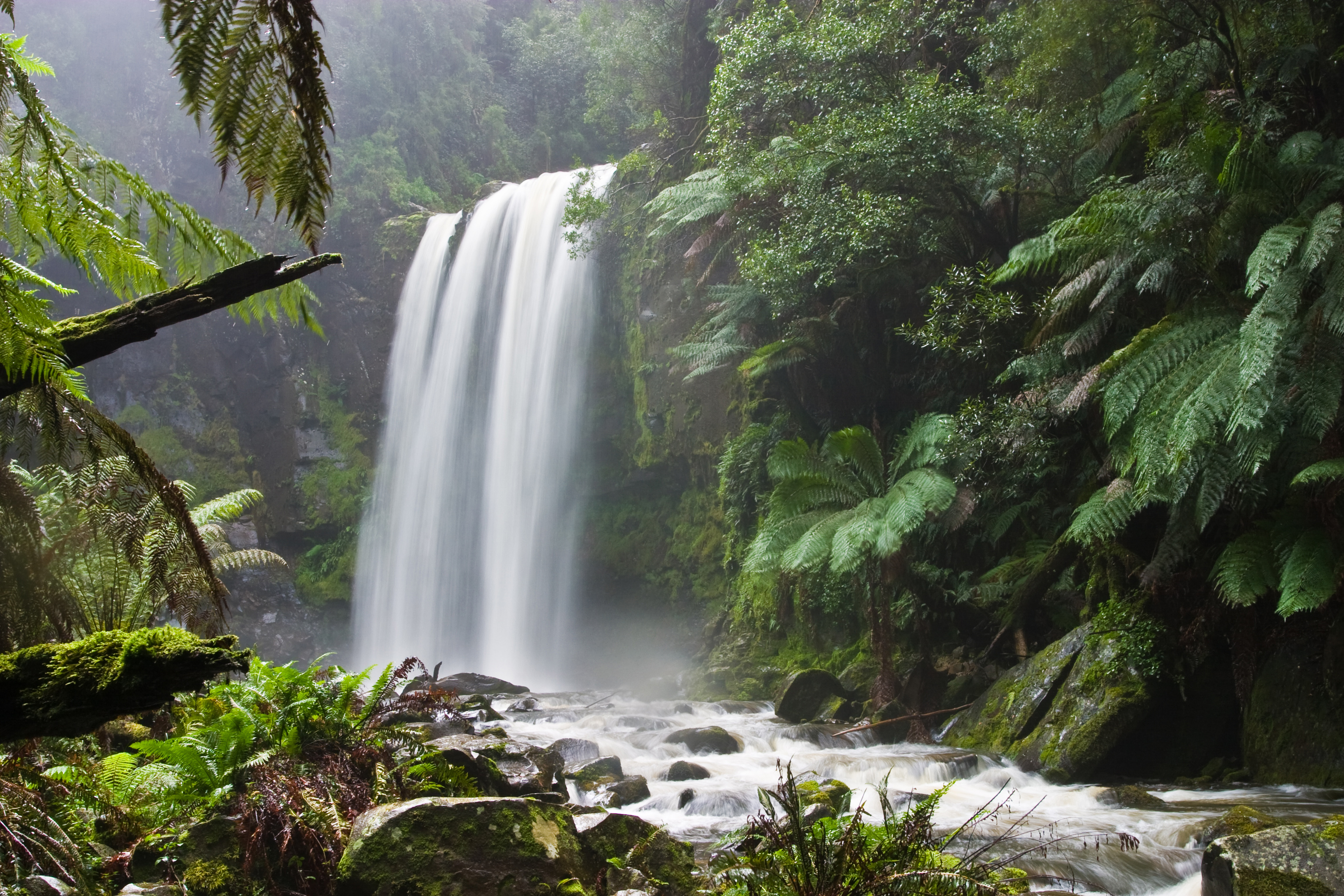
Hopetoun Falls, Great Otway National Park, Victoria

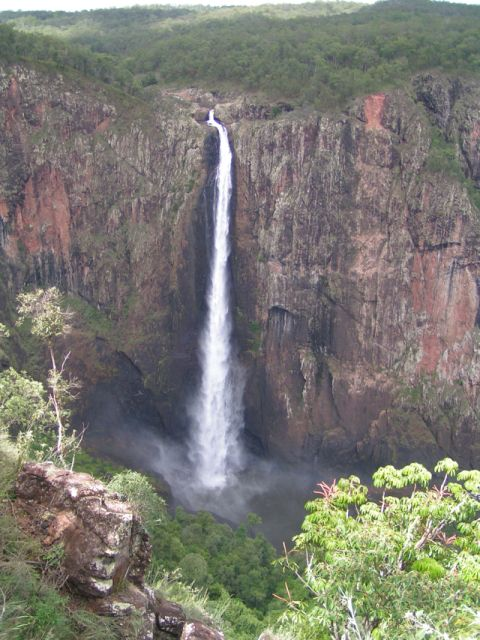
Wallaman Falls, Girringun National Park, Queensland. Australia's tallest waterfall.

This is a list of waterfalls in Australia.

Wallaman Falls in Queensland are Australia's tallest permanent waterfall with a plunge of nearly 268 metres (879 ft). Wollomombi Falls in New South Wales are second with a 220-metre (720 ft) combined drop and Ellenborough Falls, also in New South Wales, is third plunging 200 metres (660 ft) as a single drop.

The list below is not exhaustive – there are many other non-notable waterfalls found in more inaccessible areas which have not been included.

== Australian Capital Territory ==
The following waterfalls are located in the Australian Capital Territory:

Waterfalls of the Australian Capital Territory
Image	Waterfall	Location	Drop		Type	Coordinates	Notes
Image	Waterfall	Location	m	ft	Type	Coordinates	Notes
	Gibraltar Falls	Namadgi National Park	67–120	220–394	Cascade	35°29′12″S 148°56′06″E	
	Ginini Falls	Namadgi National Park	190–220	623–722		35°29′43″S 148°48′16″E	

== New South Wales ==
The following waterfalls are located in New South Wales:

Waterfalls of New South Wales
Image	Waterfall	Location	Drop		Type	Coordinates	Notes
Image	Waterfall	Location	m	ft	Type	Coordinates	Notes
	Abbots Falls	On the Manning River, south of Wingham	5.8–8	19–26			
		Blue Mountains National Park				33°43′54″S 150°26′04″E	
	Apsley Falls	Oxley Wild Rivers National Park	114	374	Cascade	31°02′58″S 151°46′06″E	
	Arethusa Falls	Blue Mountains National Park				33°39′54″S 150°20′04″E	
	Bakers Creek Falls	Near Waterfall Way, Oxley Wild Rivers National Park				30°32′54″S 151°53′04″E	
	Balaka Falls	Carlingford	4–5	13–16		33°46′44″S 151°01′59″E	
	Bangalore Falls	Bindarri National Park				30°16′01″S 152°55′30″E	
	Barrallliers Falls	Kanangra-Boyd National Park	150–200	492–656		34°00′54″S 150°06′04″E	
	Barrier Falls	Kanangra-Boyd National Park	150–260	492–853			
	Beauchamp Falls	Blue Mountains National Park	10	33	Cascade	33°39′54″S 150°20′04″E	
	Belgrave Falls	On the Macleay River, west of Kempsey	3.3–3.4	11–11			
	Belmore Falls	Morton National Park	78	256	Tiered	34°38′20″S 150°33′34″E	
	Bernard Grotto Falls	Kanangra-Boyd National Park	150–200	492–656			
	Black Banksia Falls	Kanangra-Boyd National Park				33°57′00″S 150°01′00″E	
	Bona Vista Falls	On a tributary of the Ellenborough River, near Tapin Tops National Park	81–110	266–361		31°35′54″S 152°26′04″E	
	Bong Bong Falls	near Koorawatha	37–42	121–138		33°58′54″S 148°32′04″E	
	Bonnie Doon Falls	Blue Mountains National Park				33°42′54″S 150°17′04″E	
	Boonoo Boonoo Falls	On the Boonoo Boonoo River, in the Boonoo Boonoo National Park	110–160	361–525			
	Boundary Falls	Gibraltar Range National Park					
	Breretons Falls	Near Waterfall Way, Oxley Wild Rivers National Park				30°34′54″S 151°55′04″E	
	Bridal Veil Falls	Near the Kerewong State Forest	130–210	427–689			
	Bridal Veil Falls, Leura	near Leura, Blue Mountains National Park			Cascade	33°42′54″S 150°19′04″E	
	Bundundah Falls	Morton National Park	19–32	62–105			
	Burgess Falls	Blue Mountains National Park				33°42′54″S 150°27′50″E	
	Calcutta Falls	Blue Mountains National Park	14	45		33°33′54″S 150°24′04″E	
	Carrington Falls	Budderoo National Park	50	164	Plunge	34°37′28″S 150°39′17″E	
	Cataract Falls	Blue Mountains National Park				33°43′54″S 150°27′04″E	
	Chandler Falls	Oxley Wild Rivers National Park				30°32′00″S 152°02′51″E	
	Clarinda Falls	Blue Mountains National Park				33°41′54″S 150°32′04″E	
	Clouds Creek Falls	Blue Mountains National Park				30°02′00″S 152°40′00″E	
	Coal Mine Falls	Wingello State Froest, near Bundanoon	94–110	308–361			
	Corrowong Falls	On a tributary of the Snowy River	56–90	184–295			
	Crooked Falls	Morton National Park	160–260	525–853			
	Crystal Shower Falls	Dorrigo National Park, Waterfall Way				30°22′40″S 152°44′02″E	
	Dangar Falls	near Dorrigo				30°19′40″S 152°42′53″E	
	Dangars Falls	Oxley Wild Rivers National Park	120	394		30°41′00″S 151°43′00″E	
	Darling Mills Cascades	Bidjigal Reserve in West Pennant Hills	4–6	13–20			
	Deep Gorge Falls	Tapin Tops National Park	50–68	164–223			
	Diamond Falls	Blue Mountains National Park				33°44′54″S 150°17′04″E	
	Diamond Falls	Near the Kerewong State Forest	17–20	56–66			
	Dilgry Falls	Barrington Tops National Park	110–170	361–558			
	Dubbo Falls	Buccleuch State Forest	74–110	243–361			
	Dungeon Falls	Wingello State Forest	310–500	1,017–1,640			
	Ebor Falls	Guy Fawkes River National Park, Waterfall Way	44–50	144–164		30°24′08″S 152°20′30″E	
	Edenderry Falls	Blue Mountains National Park				33°38′54″S 150°20′04″E	
	Edith Falls	Blue Mountains National Park				33°42′54″S 150°29′04″E	
	Ellenborough Falls	On the Ellenborough River, near Tapin Tops National Park	120–130	394–427		31°36′44″S 152°17′40″E	
	Empress Falls	near Wentworth Falls, Blue Mountains National Park				33°43′15″S 150°21′33″E	
	Fairy Falls	Blue Mountains National Park				33°42′54″S 150°26′04″E	
	Federal Falls	Blue Mountains National Park				33°43′54″S 150°27′04″E	
	Federal Falls (Orange)	Mount Canobolas State Conservation Area			33°21′01.1″S 148°57′46.1″E		
	Fitzroy Falls	Morton National Park	160–220	525–722	Plunge	34°39′S 150°29′E	
	Forgotten Waterfalls	Dorrigo National Park, Waterfall Way				30°23′17″S 152°45′44″E	
	Frederica Falls	Blue Mountains National Park				33°42′54″S 150°26′04″E	
	Fredroy Falls	near Armidale				30°47′00″S 151°46′00″E	
	Gerringong Falls	Budderoo National Park	150–180	492–591			
	Ginninderra Falls	On the Ginninderra Creek, near Hall	44–65	144–213		35°11′49″S 148°57′40″E	
	Glenraphael Falls	Blue Mountains National Park				33°47′54″S 150°16′04″E	
	Gloucester Falls	Barrington Tops National Park				32°06′00″S 151°36′00″E	
	Gordon Falls (New South Wales)	Blue Mountains National Park				33°43′54″S 150°20′04″E	
	Govetts Leap	Blue Mountains National Park	180	591	Bridal veil	33°38′00″S 150°19′00″E	
	Granite Falls	Morton National Park	43–73	141–240			
	Hazel Falls	Blue Mountains National Park				33°42′54″S 150°28′04″E	
	Higgin Falls	Kanangra-Boyd National Park	150–260	492–853			
	Hilary Falls	Blue Mountains National Park				33°38′54″S 150°21′04″E	
	Horseshoe Falls	Near Blackheath, Blue Mountains National Park				33°37′54″S 150°18′04″E	
	Isobel Falls	Blue Mountains National Park				33°43′12″S 150°21′34″E	
	Jerusalem Creek Falls	near Dungog				32°14′00″S 151°43′30″E	
	Junction Falls	Blue Mountains National Park				33°43′54″S 150°26′04″E	
	Kalang Falls	Kanangra-Boyd National Park				33°58′48″S 150°06′05″E	
	Kanangra Falls	Kanangra-Boyd National Park	225	738		33°59′00″S 150°06′00″E	
	Katoomba Falls	Blue Mountains National Park			Segmented	33°43′54″S 150°18′04″E	
	Kellin Falls	Near Tintenbar, in Ballina Shire				28°46′24″S 153°31′04″E	
	Leslie Falls	Blue Mountains National Park				33°43′54″S 150°26′04″E	
	Leura Falls	Blue Mountains National Park				33°43′54″S 150°19′04″E	
	Lila Falls	Blue Mountains National Park				33°43′54″S 150°19′04″E	
	Linda Falls	Blue Mountains National Park				33°43′54″S 150°19′04″E	
	Ladore Falls	Blue Mountains National Park			Segmented	33°42′54″S 150°22′04″E	
	Lyrebird Falls	Blue Mountains National Park				33°42′41″S 150°27′29″E	
	Mabel Falls	Blue Mountains National Park				33°43′54″S 150°29′04″E	
	Magdala Falls	Blue Mountains National Park				33°43′54″S 150°34′04″E	
	Margaret Falls	Kanangra-Boyd National Park	150–200	492–656		30°00′00″S 150°06′00″E	
	Marshalls Falls	Near Alstonville, south of the Bruxner Highway in Ballina Shire				28°51′54″S 153°27′04″E	
	Martins Falls (also known as Lower Falls)	Blue Mountains National Park				33°43′54″S 150°34′04″E	
	Mihi Falls	Oxley Wild Rivers National Park	150–190	492–623		30°41′54″S 151°44′04″E	
	Millnigang Falls	On a tributary of the Wollondilly River, west of Berrima	130–240	427–787			
	Minnamurra Falls	West of Jamberoo, Budderoo National Park	230–290	755–951			
	Minnatonka Falls	Blue Mountains National Park				33°43′54″S 150°25′04″E	
	Minnehaha Falls	Blue Mountains National Park				33°40′54″S 150°20′04″E	
	Minyon Falls	Nightcap National Park	104	341		28°37′00″S 153°23′00″E	
	Moffatt Falls	Near the Waterfall Way, New England National Park				30°29′24″S 152°20′34″E	
	Moorakoo Falls	Blue Mountains National Park				33°46′54″S 150°38′04″E	
	Munnuldi Falls	Morton National Park	130–190	427–623			
	Newell Falls	Dorrigo National Park, Waterfall Way				30°23′37″S 152°44′45″E	
	North Overshot	North of Broken Hill	23–36	75–118			
	Numantia Falls	Blue Mountains National Park				33°42′54″S 150°32′04″E	
	Oaky Falls	Near the Waterfall Way, Oxley Wild River National Park				30°34′54″S 152°04′04″E	
	Paddys River Falls	Kosciuszko National Park	18	59	Cascade	35°51′35″S 148°06′54″E	
	Perryman Falls	Morton National Park	100–150	328–492			
	Petroi Falls	Cunnawarra National Park				30°43′08″S 152°18′14″E	
	Protestors Falls	Nightcap National Park	25	82		28°34′12″S 153°18′17″E	
	Rawson Falls	On a tributary of the Ellenborough River, near Tapin Tops National Park, in the Boorganna Nature Reserve	55–65	180–213			
	Second Falls	Blue Mountains National Park				33°42′54″S 150°19′04″E	
	Sherrard Falls	Dorrigo National Park, Waterfall Way				30°23′11″S 152°44′27″E	
	Sluice Box Falls	Budawang National Park	99–150	325–492			
	Sparkles Falls	Morton National Park	43–86	141–282			
	St Michaels Falls	Blue Mountains National Park				33°42′42″S 150°25′29″E	
	Talbragar River Falls	Coolah Tops National Park				31°45′20″S 150°05′22″E	
	Terrace Falls	Blue Mountains National Park				33°44′54″S 150°27′04″E	
	Trinity Falls	Blue Mountains National Park				33°37′54″S 150°19′04″E	
	The Upper Falls and The Lower Falls	Werrikimbe National Park	60–120	197–394			
	Tia Falls	Oxley Wild Rivers National Park	44–63	144–207			
	Tin Mine Falls	Kosciuszko National Park				36°40′00″S 148°14′00″E	
	Tianjara Falls	Morton National Park	110–190	361–623	Plunge	35°06′35″S 150°19′53″E	
	Tuross Falls	Wadbilliga National Park	190–200	623–656			
	Undercliffe Falls	South-east of Stanthorpe	140–160	459–525			
	Valentine Falls	Kosciuszko National Park				36°13′00″S 148°22′00″E	
	Vera Falls	Blue Mountains National Park				33°43′54″S 150°22′04″E	
	Victor Falls	Blue Mountains National Park				33°44′54″S 150°27′04″E	
	Victoria Falls	Grose Valley, Blue Mountains National Park	120–150	394–492	Cascades	33°33′54″S 150°18′04″E	
	Wentworth Falls	Wentworth Falls, Blue Mountains National Park				33°43′54″S 150°22′04″E	
	Westerway Falls	Blue Mountains National Park				33°33′54″S 150°24′04″E	
	Wheengee Whungee Falls	Kanangra-Boyd National Park	150–260	492–853		34°00′54″S 150°04′04″E	
	William Falls	Morton National Park	74–110	243–361		34°58′54″S 150°16′04″E	
	Wollomombi Falls	Near the Waterfall Way, Oxley Wild Rivers National Park	170	558		30°32′00″S 152°02′00″E	

== Northern Territory ==
The following waterfalls are located in the Northern Territory:

Waterfalls of the Northern Territory
Image	Waterfall	Location	Drop		Type	Coordinates	Notes
Image	Waterfall	Location	m	ft	Type	Coordinates	Notes
	17 Mile Falls	Nitmiluk National Park	30–33	98–108		14°03′S 132°24′E	
	Bine – Jeruk Falls	Litchfield National Park	32–49	105–161		13°08′53″S 130°40′46″E	
	Crystal Falls	Nitmiluk National Park	35–42	115–138			
	Cuthbertson Falls	Arnhem Land	14–15	46–49		12°33′41″S 133°52′41″E	
	Edith Falls / Leliyn	Nitmiluk National Park	8.7–12	29–39	Cascade	14°10′S 132°10′E	
	Florence Falls	Litchfield National Park	9.8–15	32–49	Segmented	13°05′56″S 130°46′50″E	
	Gunlom Falls / Waterfall Creek	Kakadu National Park	60–85	197–279	Cascade	13°25′37″S 132°25′00″E	
	Havelock Falls	Arnhem Land	4.4–6	14–20		12°40′29″S 133°51′19″E	
	Henscke Falls	near Peppimenarti	21–40	69–131		14°11′30″S 130°11′54″E	
	Inukalen Cataract	near Timber Creek	3.3–5	11–16		15°19′15″S 130°44′17″E	
	Jim Jim Falls / Barrkmalam	Kakadu National Park	140–200	459–656	Plunge	13°16′20″S 132°50′22″E	
	Kathleen Falls	Flora River Nature Park				14°45′29″S 131°35′36″E	
	Lily Ponds Falls	Nitmiluk National Park	3.6–6.6	12–22		14°19′22″S 132°28′05″E	
	Mandjawuril / Mandjaworlbidji	near Gunbalanya in Arnhem Land	55–70	180–230		12°21′46″S 133°05′34″E	
	Myra Falls	near Gunbalanya	8.3–11	27–36		12°27′00″S 133°19′59″E	
	Robin Falls	Robin Falls	20–25	66–82		13°21′21″S 131°07′44″E	
	Rosies Falls	near Kununurra	32–43	105–141		15°28′07″S 129°20′48″E	
	Surprise Creek Falls	Litchfield National Park				13°24′24″S 130°47′20″E	
	Tjaetaba Falls	Litchfield National Park	35–48	115–157		13°11′44″S 130°42′12″E	
	Tjaynera Falls	Litchfield National Park	31–46	102–151		13°14′40″S 130°45′29″E	
	Tolmer Falls	Litchfield National Park	32–42	105–138	Plunge	13°12′20″S 130°42′52″E	
	Trudies Falls	near Kununurra	61–94	200–308		15°27′09″S 129°20′26″E	
	Twin Falls / Gungkurdul	Kakadu National Park	44–51	144–167	Cascade	13°19′20″S 132°46′41″E	
	Walwalgiyn Falls	Litchfield National Park	17–22	56–72		13°11′13″S 130°41′45″E	
	Wangi Falls	Litchfield National Park	41–52	135–171	Segmented	13°09′49″S 130°41′07″E	
	Yawuriyarra Falls	Limmen National Park	2.3–2.6	8–9		15°43′39″S 135°15′28″E	

== Queensland ==
The following waterfalls are located in Queensland:

Waterfalls of Queensland
Image	Waterfall	Location	Drop		Type	Coordinates	Notes
Image	Waterfall	Location	m	ft	Type	Coordinates	Notes
	Alcheringa Falls	Lamington National Park				28°16′17″S 153°10′06″E	
	Alligator Creek Falls	Bowling Green Bay National Park					
	Annan Gorge Falls	Cooktown					
	Ballanjui Falls	Lamington National Park				28°12′52″S 153°12′07″E	
	Barron Falls	Barron Gorge National Park	125	410	Cascade	16°50′19″S 145°38′45″E	
	Big Mowbray Falls	Mowbray National Park					
	Bilbrough Falls	Springbrook National Park			Cascade	28°13′22″S 153°17′06″E	
	Binda Falls	Wooroonooran National Park				17°37′43″S 145°46′21″E	
	Birthday Creek Falls	Paluma Range National Park					
	Blencoe Falls	Girringun National Park	320	1,050	Segmented	18°13′27″S 145°32′23″E	
	Bloomfield Falls	near Wujal Wujal, north of the Daintree National Park	40	131	Cascade	15°57′32″S 145°19′10″E	
	Box Log Falls	Lamington National Park				28.242321°S 153.153448°E	
	Browns Falls	east of Killarney	10–15	33–49	Plunge	28°21′00″S 152°21′00″E	
	Buderim Falls	Buderim Forest Park				26°40′40″S 153°02′50″E	
	Cannabullen Falls	Tully Gorge National Park					
	Carter Falls	Tully Gorge National Park					
	Chalahn Falls	Lamington National Park				28°14′45″S 153°09′57″E	
	Clamshell Falls	Wooroonooran National Park			Cascade	17°11′22″S 145°49′24″E	
	Coomba Falls	2 kilometres (1.2 mi) east of Maidenwell	4	13	Plunge	26°51′01″S 151°48′56″E	
	Coomera Falls	Lamington National Park	64	210	Segmented	28°14′00″S 153°11′00″E	
	Cowley Falls	Wooroonooran National Park				17°38′03″S 145°48′05″E	
	Crystal Cascades	near Cairns			Cascade	16°57′42″S 145°40′46″E	
	Daggs Falls	east of Killarney			Plunge	28°20′43″S 152°20′50″E	
	Darraboola Falls	Lamington National Park				28°13′24″S 153°08′14″E	
	Davies Creek Falls	Davies Creek National Park	100	328	Cascade	17°00′29″S 145°34′51″E	
	Dinner Falls	Mount Hypipamee National Park			Plunge; Segmented; Cascade	17°25′59″S 145°29′00″E	
	Echo Falls	Lamington National Park				28°16′13″S 153°09′40″E	
	Elabana Falls	Lamington National Park			Cascade	28°15′00″S 153°08′59″E	
	Elizabeth Grant Falls	Tully Gorge National Park					
	Ellinjaa Falls	Atherton Tablelands Waterfall Circuit				17°29′39″S 145°39′25″E	
	Elliot (Indian Head) Falls	Apudthama National Park					
	Emerald Creek Falls	Kennedy Highway southwest of Cairns				17°03′20″S 145°32′28″E	
	Endeavour Falls	Cooktown				-15.370657, 145.030013	
	Fishery Falls	Wooroonooran National Park				17°10′04″S 145°50′02″E	
	Fruit Bat Falls	Apudthama National Park					
	Home Rule Falls	Cooktown				-15.738580, 145.298395	
	Herbert River Falls	Girringun National Park	56–75	184–246	Plunge	18°14′06″S 145°22′15″E	
	Isabella Falls	Cooktown				-15.299845, 145.005544	
	J C Slaughter Falls	Mount Coot-tha Reserve, Brisbane			Cascade	27°29′00″S 152°57′59″E	
	Jones Falls	Wooroonooran National Park	10–13	33–43			
	Josephine Falls	Wooroonooran National Park	150–300	492–984	Tiered cascade	17°25′46″S 145°51′34″E	
	Jourama Falls	Paluma Range National Park					
	Kalgamahla Falls	Lamington National Park				28°13′45″S 153°08′45″E	
	Kearneys Falls	Wooroonooran National Park				17°14′06″S 145°47′07″E	
	Kondalilla Falls	near Mapleton					
	Leichhardt Falls	Gulf Country			Plunge	18°13′11″S 139°52′44″E	
	Little Millstream Falls	Millstream Falls National Park				17°38′00″S 145°23′00″E	
	Macgregor Falls	Springbrook National Park				28°11′49″S 153°14′24″E	
	Malanda Falls	Atherton Tableland				17°21′18″S 145°35′11″E	
	Mcgrory Falls	Bunya Mountains National Park					
	Mena Creek Falls	near Innisfail					
	Millaa Millaa Falls	Atherton Tableland Waterfall Circuit	18.3	60	Plunge	17°29′44″S 145°36′36″E	
	Millstream Falls	Millstream Falls National Park				17°38′35″S 145°27′27″E	
	Milmilgee Falls	near Cairns	29–53	95–174		16°58′20″S 145°39′50″E	
	Morans Falls	Lamington National Park	80	262	Plunge	28°13′50″S 153°07′29″E	
	Mungalli Falls	Wooroonooran National Park				17°32′17″S 145°40′55″E	
	Murray Falls	Girramay National Park	20–30	66–98	Cascade	18°09′10″S 145°49′09″E	
	Nandroya Falls	Wooroonooran National Park				17°35′02″S 145°44′49″E	
	Nugurun Falls	Lamington National Park					
	Parrot Falls	Cooktown					
	Pepina Falls	Atherton Tablelands Waterfall Circuit				17°35′09″S 145°36′57″E	
	Purling Brook Falls	Springbrook National Park	100–106	328–348	Horsetail	28°11′00″S 153°16′00″E	
	Queen Mary Falls	Main Range National Park	40	131	Plunge	28°20′00″S 152°22′00″E	
	Roaring Meg Falls	near Wujal Wujal, north of the Daintree National Park					
	Running Creek Falls	Lamington National Park				28°19′00″S 153°04′03″E	
	Savo Falls	Apudthama National Park					
	Silver Creek Falls	Wooroonooran National Park				17°35′17″S 145°44′53″E	
	Simpson Falls	Mount Coot-tha Reserve, Brisbane			Cascade	27°27′54″S 152°57′18″E	
	Souita Falls	Atherton Tableland Waterfall Circuit				17°33′53″S 145°38′44″E	
	Spring Creek Falls	Mowbray Valley					
	Stoney Creek Falls	Barron Gorge National Park			Cascade	16°51′03″S 145°38′50″E	
	Surprise Creek Falls	Barron Gorge National Park	243	797	Segmented	18°10′25″S 145°36′10″E	
	Tanninaba Falls	Springbrook National Park				28°11′15″S 153°16′01″E	
	Tchupala Falls	Wooroonooran National Park			Segmented	17°36′00″S 145°47′00″E	
	Teviot Falls	McPherson Range near Wilson's Peak	38	125	Plunge	28°14′00″S 152°29′00″E	
	Tim Shea Falls	Bunya Mountains National Park					
	Tinaroo Falls	near Cairns				17°09′49″S 145°32′45″E	
	Toolona Falls	Lamington National Park				28°14′51″S 153°10′10″E	
	Trevethan Falls	Cooktown					
	Tully Falls	Tully Gorge National Park	180–210	591–689	Horsetail chute	17°47′00″S 145°34′00″E	
	Twin Falls	Apudthama National Park					
	Wallaman Falls	Girringun National Park	305	1,001	Cascade; Horsetail	18°35′32″S 145°48′05″E	
	Wallicher Falls	Wooroonooran National Park				17°36′12″S 145°46′14″E	
	Whites Falls	Wooroonooran National Park				17°12′00″S 145°50′00″E	
	Wongalee Falls	near Cairns	58–81	190–266		16°57′48″S 145°40′04″E	
	Yamanie Falls	Girringun National Park					
	Yabba Falls	Yabba State Forest, Jimna					
	Yanbacoochie Falls	Lamington National Park				28°14′09″S 153°09′05″E	
	Yarrbilgong Falls	Lamington National Park	150	492		28°13′55″S 153°11′25″E	
	Zillie Falls	Atherton Tableland Waterfall Circuit				17°28′29″S 145°39′25″E	

== South Australia ==
The following waterfalls are located in South Australia:

Waterfalls of South Australia
Image	Waterfall	Location	Drop		Type	Coordinates	Notes
Image	Waterfall	Location	m	ft	Type	Coordinates	Notes
	Ferntree Falls	Flinders Ranges				31°37′04″S 138°34′44″E	
	Fifth Falls						
	First Falls (Adelaide Hills)	Morialta Conservation Park	30	98	Plunge	35°54′23″S 138°42′29″E	
	First Falls (City of Burnside)	Waterfall Gully, Cleland National Park			Cascade	34°58′14″S 138°40′53″E	
	Fourth Falls						
	Glenora Falls	Flinders Ranges				31°30′07″S 138°30′38″E	
	Hay Flat Waterfall	Hay Flat				35°31′57″S 138°20′29″E	
	Hindmarsh Falls	Hindmarsh Valley				35°26′41″S 138°34′56″E	
	Ingalalla Waterfalls	Fleurieu Peninsula	81–92	266–302	Cascade	35°31′52″S 138°20′34″E	
	Kanalla Falls	Flinders Ranges	64–79	210–259		31°30′07″S 138°30′38″E	
	Kapinka Falls	Yallunda Flat				34°18′02″S 135°53′06″E	
	Lower Waterfall						
	Malloga Falls	Flinders Ranges				31°31′04″S 138°31′42″E	
	Mannum Waterfalls	Mannum				34°55′45″S 139°12′54″E	
	Morialta Falls	Morialta Conservation Park					
	Petalinka Waterfall	Mount Freeling				30°10′55″S 139°17′23″E	
	Second Falls (Adelaide Hills)	Morialta Conservation Park	15	49			
	Second Falls (City of Burnside)						
	Seventh Falls						
	Six Falls						
	Strepara Waterfall	Middle River				35°42′25″S 137°05′45″E	
	The Waterfall						
	The Waterfalls						
	Third Falls	Morialta Conservation Park	13	43			
	Upper Waterfall						
	Wadella Falls	Tumby Bay				34°19′26″S 136°01′00″E	
	Waukarie Falls	Quorn				32°28′03″S 138°00′52″E	

== Tasmania ==
The following waterfalls are located in Tasmania:

Waterfalls of Tasmania
Image	Waterfall	Location	Drop		Type	Coordinates	Notes
Image	Waterfall	Location	m	ft	Type	Coordinates	Notes
	Delaneys Falls	North West Tasmania	25	82	Plunge	41°16′48″S 146°03′36″E	
	Dip Falls	Dip Range Regional Reserve, North West Tasmania	22–34	72–112	Cascade	41°01′48″S 145°22′12″E	
	Guide Falls	North West Tasmania	22–38	72–125	Tiered–cascade	41°09′00″S 145°48′00″E	
	Horseshoe Falls	Mount Field National Park			Tiered–cascade	42°40′12″S 146°42′36″E	
	Lady Barron Falls	Mount Field National Park			Tiered–cascade	42°41′24″S 146°41′24″E	
	Liffey Falls	Meander Valley, Midlands	120–160	394–525	Tiered–cascade	41°41′24″S 146°45′36″E	
	Montezuma Falls	West Coast Range	103–110	338–361	Horsetail	41°49′48″S 145°28′12″E	
	Nelson Falls	Franklin-Gordon Wild Rivers National Park	30	98	Cascade	42°05′24″S 145°43′48″E	
	Russell Falls	Mount Field National Park	34–58	112–190	Tiered–cascade	42°40′12″S 146°42′36″E	
	Adamsons Falls	Southwest National Park	50	164	Cascade		
	Meander Falls	Meander Conservation Area			Cascade		
	Reynolds Falls	Reynolds Falls Nature Recreation Area, North West Tasmania			Plunge		
	Horsetail Falls	Queenstown, Western Tasmania	50	164	Cascade		
	Adams Falls	Clear Hill Regional Reserve	40–50	131–164	Cascade		
	Minnow Falls	Mount Roland Regional Reserve	160–200	525–656	Tiered-cascade		
	Winterbrook Falls	Winterbrook Falls Regional Reserve, North West Tasmania	160	525	Tiered-cascade		
	Philosopher Falls	Waratah, North West Tasmania			Tiered-cascade	41°46′55″S 145°46′39″E	

== Victoria ==
The following waterfalls are located in Victoria:

Waterfalls of Victoria
Image	Waterfall	Location	Drop		Type	Coordinates	Notes
Image	Waterfall	Location	m	ft	Type	Coordinates	Notes
	Acquila Falls	Benwerrin	7.24	24			
	Agnes Falls	Toora	59	194			
	Beauchamp Falls	Otway Forest Park, near Beech Forest	16–26	52–85		38°39′03″S 143°36′27″E	
	Buckley Falls	Geelong	2	7		38°09′03″S 144°18′25″E	
	Bindaree Falls	Mount Buller Alpine Resort, near Mount Buller	16–26	52–85		37°08′58″S 146°33′13″E	
	Box Canyon Falls	Tanybryn	12.03	39		38°38′01″S 143°43′41″E	
	Carisbrook Falls	Great Otway National Park, near Wongarra	64–120	210–394		38°41′32″S 143°48′33″E	
	Carmichael Falls	Alpine National Park, Alpine Shire	25	82		37°01′40″S 147°14′22″E	
	Cora Lynn Cascades	Great Otway National Park, Angahook section	89–140	292–459		38°30′30″S 143°55′37″E	
	Cumberland Falls		85–110	279–361		38°33′56″S 143°55′41″E	
	Currawong Falls						
	Dandongadale Falls	Alpine National Park, western section	255	837	Plunge		
	Erskine Falls	Great Otway National Park, Angahook section	49–57	161–187		38°29′36″S 143°54′06″E	
	Glasgow Falls	Lavers Hill	11.87	39		38°38′57.31102″S 143°22′5.38435″E	
	Gorgeous Falls	Tanybryn	7.69	25			
	Green Chasm Falls	Tanybryn	13.38	44			
	Henderson Falls	Great Otway National Park, Angahook section	8	26		38°32′17″S 143°57′39″E	
	Hopkins Falls	north of Allansford, near Warrnambool	11–13	36–43		38°20′01″S 143°37′08″E	
	Hopetoun Falls	Great Otway National Park, near Beech Forest	46–49	151–161		38°39′26″S 143°34′47″E	
	Kalimna Falls	Great Otway National Park, Angahook section					
	Ladies Baths Falls	Mt Buffalo					
	Lal Lal Falls	near Ballarat	130–190	427–623			
	Little Aire Falls	Great Otway National Park					
	Little River Falls	Snowy River National Park					
	Loddon Falls	near Daylesford	20–28	66–92			
	Masons Falls	Kinglake National Park (Sugarloaf Block), near Kinglake	45	148			
	Marriners Falls	Great Otway National Park	10	33		38°42′21″S 143°38′27″E	
	Nigretta Falls	near Coleraine	15–16	49–52		37°39′22″S 141°55′28″E	
	Olinda Falls	Falls Rd Olinda – Dandenong Ranges					
	Oren Falls	Tanybryn	5.95	20			
	Phantom Falls	Great Otway National Park, Angahook section	15	49		38°32′59″S 143°57′35″E	
	Piemans Falls	Alpine National Park, western section	234	768}			
	Sabine Falls	Great Otway National Park, near Wongarra	130	427		38°39′45″S 143°45′12″E	
	Sheoak Falls	Great Otway National Park, Angahook section					
	Silverband Falls	Grampians National Park				37°9′10″S 142°31′40″E	
	Slender Falls	Tanybryn				38°40′45″S 143°44′42″E	
	Steavenson Falls	near Marysville	55–110	180–361		37°31′58″S 145°46′25″E	
	Stevenson Falls	Otway Forest Park, near Barramunga				38°33′09″S 143°39′26″E	
	Straw Falls	Great Otway National Park, Angahook section	28–53	92–174			
	Toorongo Falls	Noojee				37°50′57″S 146°2′46″E	
	Trentham Falls	Trentham	44–48	144–157		37°22′12″S 144°19′26″E	
	Triplet Falls	Great Otway National Park, Marreeyn section				38°39′33″S 143°29′38″E	
	Wannon Falls	near Coleraine	18–22	59–72		37°40′35″S 141°50′27″E	
	Wilhelmina Falls	Murrindindi Scenic Reserve, Murrindindi Shire	92–170	302–558			
	Won Wondha Falls	Great Otway National Park, Angahook section					

== Western Australia ==
The following waterfalls are located in Western Australia:

Waterfalls of Western Australia
Image	Waterfall	Location	Drop		Type	Coordinates	Notes
Image	Waterfall	Location	m	ft	Type	Coordinates	Notes
	Baden Powell Water Spout	Murray River near Dwellingup					
	Big Mertens Falls	Mitchell Plateau in the Kimberley					
	Beedalup Falls	Beedalup National Park near Pemberton					
	Black Rock Falls	near Kununurra					
	The Cascades	Gloucester National Park			Cascade		
	Eagle Rock Falls	near Newman					
	Fernhook Falls						
	Fortescue Falls	Karijini National Park					
	Gladstone Falls						
	Hovea Falls	John Forrest National Park					
	Joffre Falls	Karijini National Park					
	Kalamina Falls	Karijini National Park					
	King George Falls	King George River					
	Kings Cascade	Prince Regent River near Wyndham					
	Lane-Poole Falls	Northcliffe				34°41′47″S 116°15′01″E	
	Lesmurdie Falls	Mundy Regional Park				31°59′39″S 116°02′03″E	
	Marrinup Falls	near Marrinup					
	Mitchell Falls	The Kimberley				14°49′00″S 125°41′00″E	
	National Park Falls	John Forrest National Park					
	Noble Falls	near Gidgegannup					
	Quinninup Falls	near Wilyabrup					
	Serpentine Falls	Serpentine National Park					
	Sixty Foot Falls	Ellis Brook Valley, Martin					
	Spa Pool	Karijini National Park					

== See also ==
- List of valleys of Australia
- List of waterfalls
