= Yarrbilgong Falls =

- Location within Queensland
- Location: South East Queensland, Australia
- Coordinates: 28°13′55″S 153°11′25″E
- Total height: 150 metres (490 ft)
- Watercourse: Coomera River

The Yarrbilgong Falls, a waterfall on the Coomera River, is located within Lamington National Park in the South East region of Queensland, Australia.

Access to the falls is along the main Coomera Track that links Binna Burra and O'Reilly's Guesthouse. The falls descend 150 metres (490 ft) into Coomera Gorge.

== See also ==
- List of waterfalls
- List of waterfalls in Australia
