= Green Chasm Falls =

Waterfall in Victoria, Australia

- Location within Victoria
- Location: Tanybryn, Victoria, Australia
- Coordinates: 38°38′2.4″S 143°43′25.499″E
- Type: Cascade
- Total height: 13.38 m (43.9 ft)
- Number of drops: 3
- Watercourse: Smythe Creek (West Branch)

Green Chasm Falls is a waterfall located in Tanybryn, Victoria, Australia, within the Great Otway National Park. It is located on the course of the western branch of Smythe Creek immediately downstream of Oren Falls, and is a part of the Mousetrap Waterfall Complex, a collection of isolated waterfalls. The name derives from the chasm created from the watercourse, along with the green foliage. The waterfall has three tiers, with the first tier height at 5.62 metres, followed by 5.77 metres for the second tier, and 1.99 for the third tier, and is at a total height of 13.38 metres.

== See also ==
- Box Canyon Falls
- Gorgeous Falls
- List of waterfalls
- List of waterfalls in Australia
- Oren Falls
