= Kanalla Falls =

- Location within South Australia
- Location: Flinders Ranges, South Australia
- Coordinates: 31°30′07″S 138°30′38″E
- Elevation: 433 metres (1,421 ft) AHD
- Total height: 64–79 metres (210–259 ft)
- Watercourse: Edeowie Creek

The Kanalla Falls, a waterfall on the Edeowie Creek, is located in the Flinders Ranges in South Australia.

Situated within the Ikara-Flinders Ranges National Park approximately 44 kilometres (27 mi) north of the village of Hawker and 380 kilometres (240 mi) north of Adelaide, the waterfalls descend from below St Mary Peak and a range of other mountains at an elevation of 433 metres (1,421 ft) above sea level; falling in the range of 64–79 metres (210–259 ft) into the Wilpena Pound valley below.

== See also ==
- List of waterfalls
- List of waterfalls in Australia
