= Beauchamp Falls (Blue Mountains) =

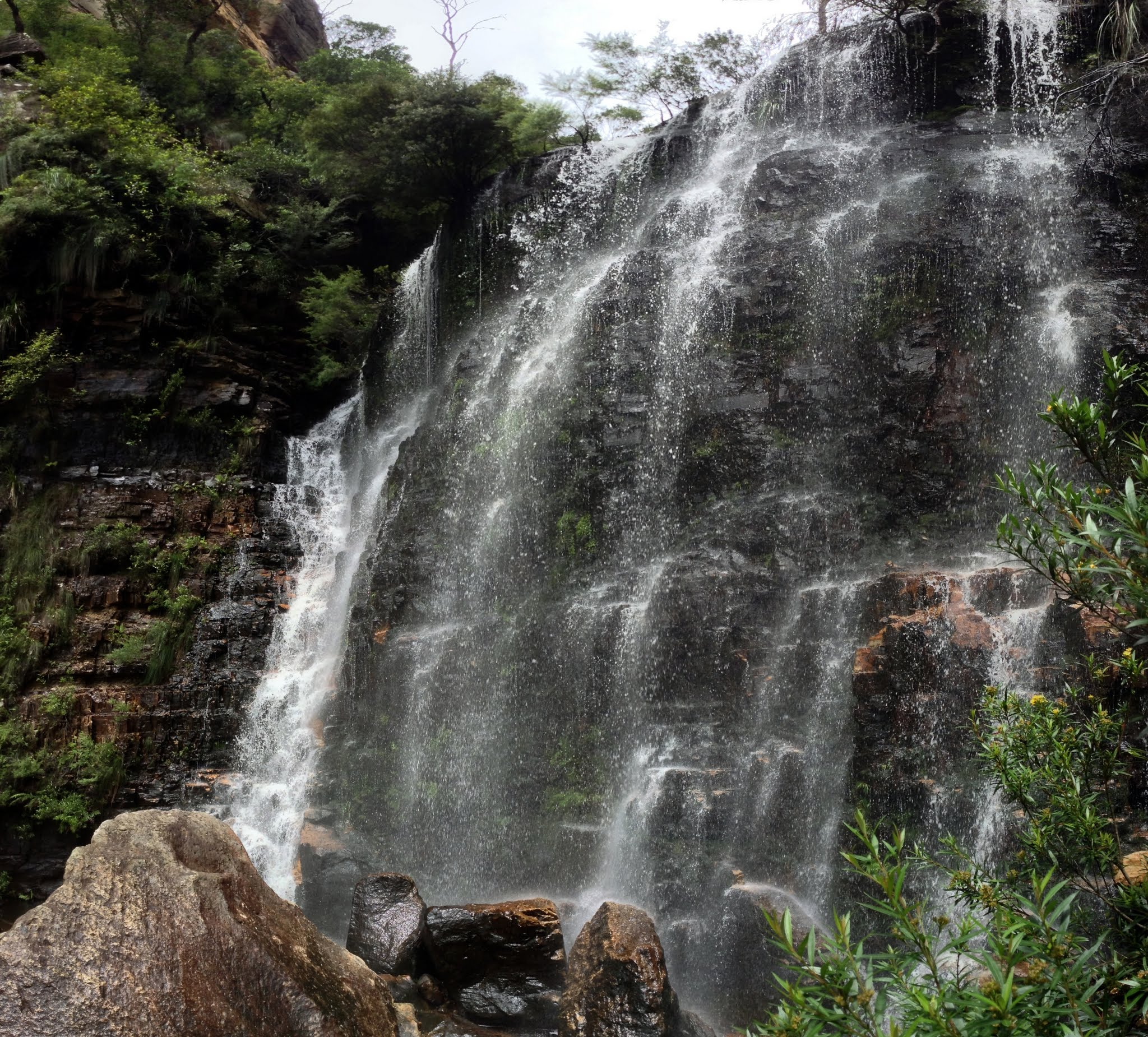
- Beauchamp Falls, pictured in 2013

- Location within New South Wales
- Location: Blue Mountains, New South Wales, Australia
- Coordinates: 33°39′54″S 150°20′04″E
- Type: Cascade
- Elevation: c. 690 metres (2,260 ft) AHD
- Total height: 10 metres (33 ft)
- Watercourse: Greaves Creek

The Beauchamp Falls is a cascade waterfall on the Greaves Creek where it spills into the Grose Valley, located east of the Evans Lookout, approximately 2.5 kilometres (1.6 mi) east of Blackheath in the Blue Mountains region of New South Wales, Australia.

Situated approximately 690 metres (2,260 ft) AHD, the falls spill 10 metres (33 ft) towards the Grose Valley floor. The falls can be accessed via walking the Rodriguez Pass walking track, part of the Grand Canyon Track, one of the heritage-listed Blue Mountains walking tracks.

The falls were named in 1899 in honour of the then Governor of New South Wales, William Lygon, 7th Earl Beauchamp; it was previously known as the Blackheath Falls.

== See also ==
- List of waterfalls
- List of waterfalls in Australia
- Blue Mountains walking tracks
