= Silverband Falls =

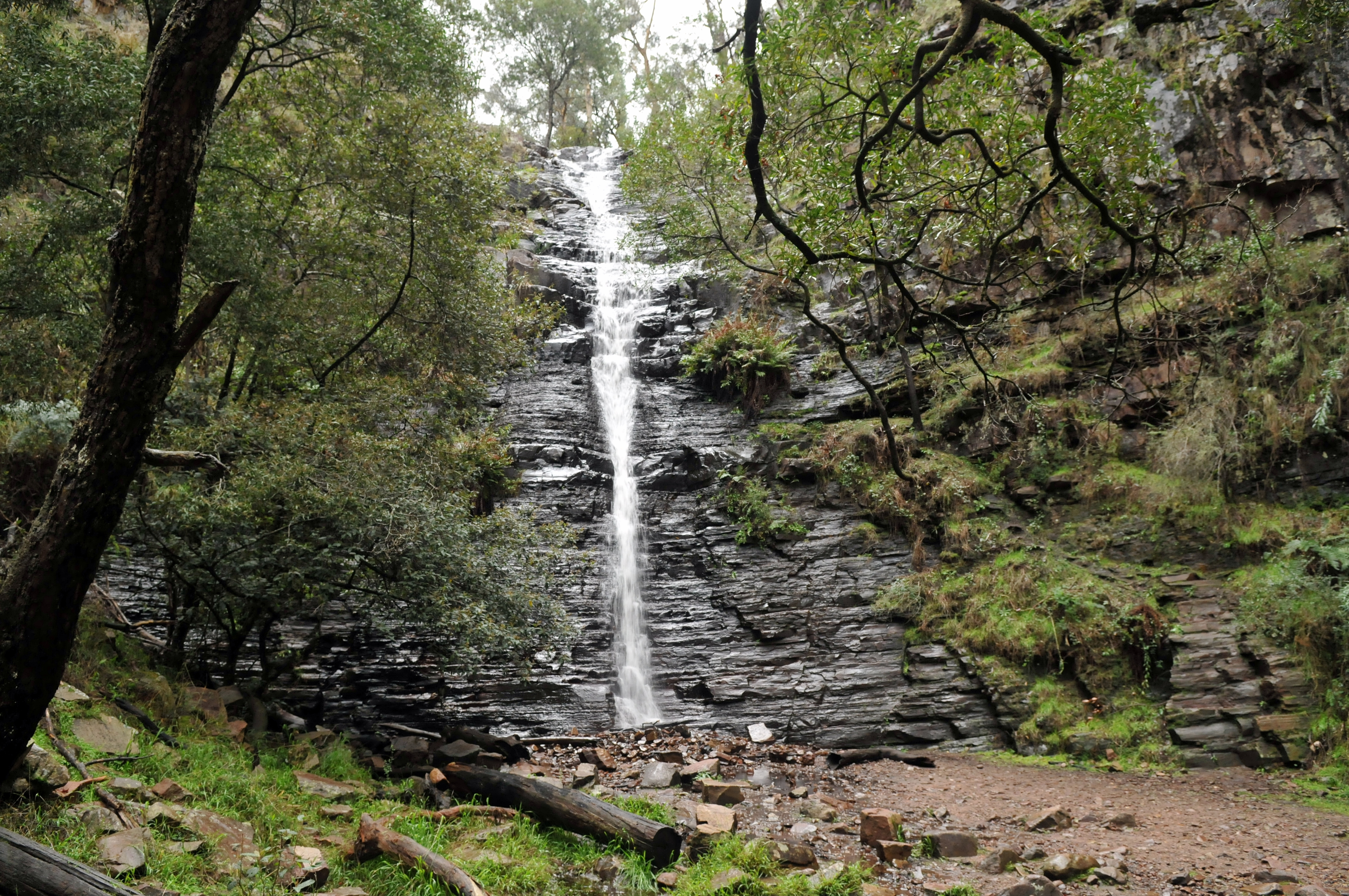
- The Silverband Falls, located in the Grampians National Park

- Location within Victoria
- Location: Grampians, Victoria, Australia
- Coordinates: 37°9′10″S 142°31′40″E
- Type: Horsetail
- Number of drops: 1
- Watercourse: Dairy Creek

Silverband Falls is a waterfall located in the Grampians National Park, in western Victoria, Australia. Fed by Dairy Creek, the horsetail falls is characterised by a narrow band of water that tumbles over a small rock face and then disappears into a rocky base. The creek re-emerges some 50 metres (160 ft) west of the falls.

Early European visitors to the falls named it Silverband because of its narrow stream of water.

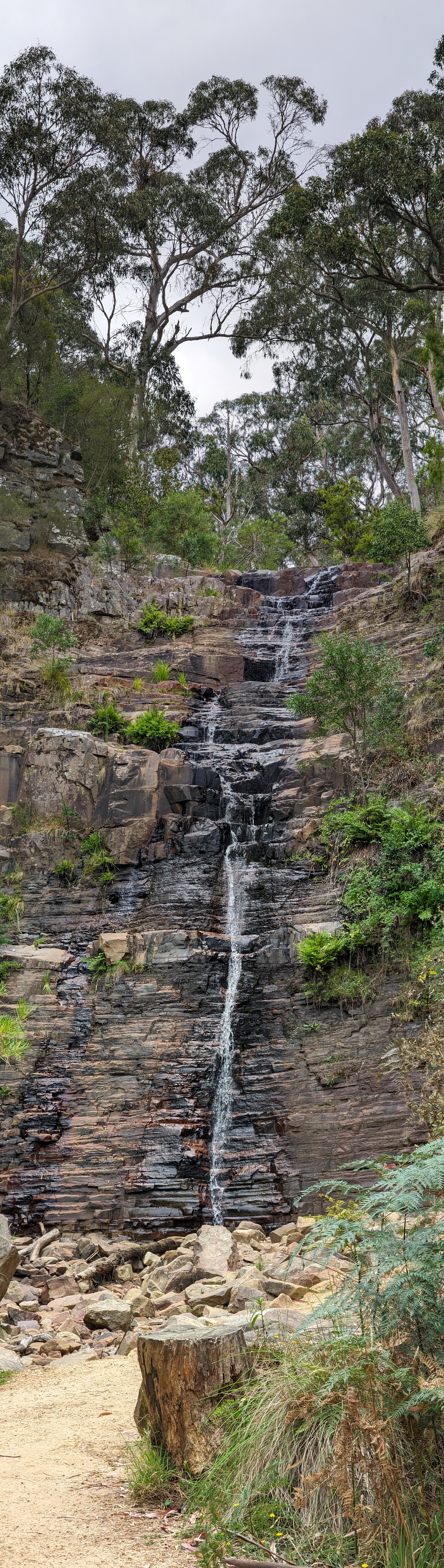

== See also ==
- List of waterfalls
- List of waterfalls in Australia
