= Bridal Veil Falls, Leura =

Bridal Veil Falls
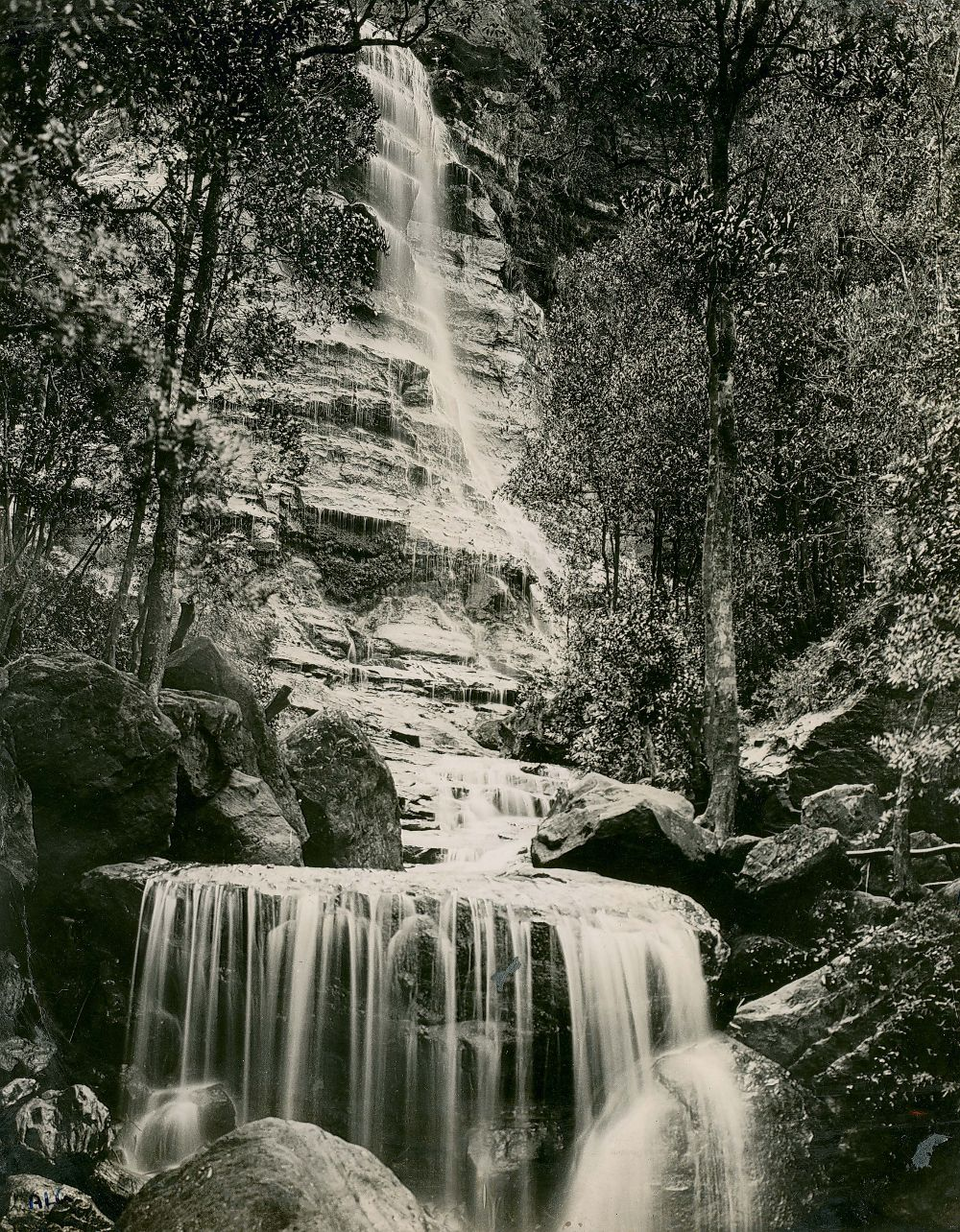
- An historical image of the Bridal Veil Falls at Leura

- Location within New South Wales
- Location: Leura, Blue Mountains, New South Wales, Australia
- Coordinates: 33°42′54″S 150°19′04″E
- Type: Cascade
- Elevation: c. 880 metres (2,890 ft) AHD
- Watercourse: Leura Falls Creek

The Bridal Veil Falls is a cascade waterfall on the Leura Falls Creek where it spills into the Jamison Valley, located south-east of Leura in the Blue Mountains region of New South Wales, Australia.

The falls are located downstream of the Leura Cascades and can be easily accessed from Leura via a short walking track that is part of the Federal Pass, one of the heritage-listed Blue Mountains walking tracks.

== See also ==
- List of waterfalls
- List of waterfalls in Australia
- Blue Mountains walking tracks
