= Adamsons Falls =

Waterfall in Tasmania

Coordinates: 43.363°S 146.845°E

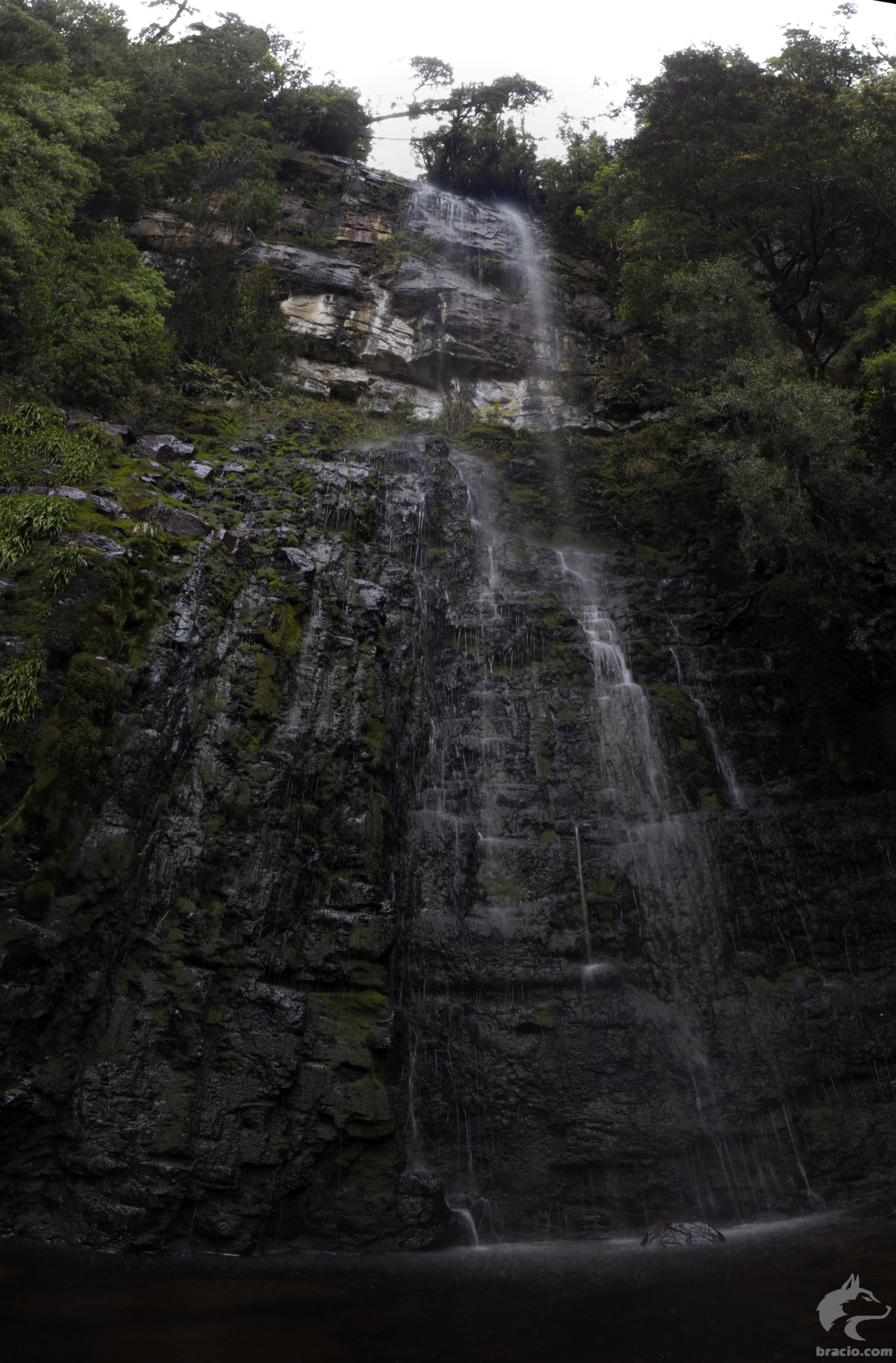
Adamsons Falls, Jan 2018

Adamsons Falls is a 50-metre-high (160 ft) plunging waterfall near Hastings Caves State Reserve in Tasmania.

To access Adamsons Falls, walkers must drive past the Hastings Caves Thermal Springs, then turn right up Chestermans Road. Take the next left and the trailhead is reached. The Tasmanian Parks and Wildlife Service have recently done some clearing, so the track is fairly straightforward. Allow 2 hours return to reach the falls. The track comes out at the base of the main drop, but there are also many smaller drops further downstream.

An array of fossils is visible at ground level.

Also in the area is Creekton Falls, less than 2 kilometres walk away from Adamsons Falls, but unfortunately the track between the two waterfalls is extremely rough and only for experienced walkers.

== See also ==
- List of waterfalls
- List of waterfalls in Australia
