= Frederica Falls =

Waterway in Lawson, New South Wales, Australia

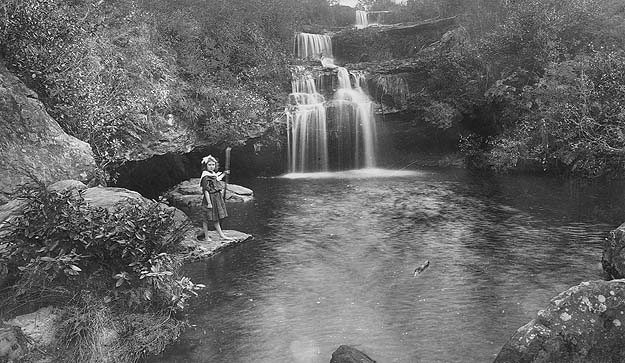
- Frederica Falls, Lawson

- Location within New South Wales
- Location: Lawson, New South Wales, Australia
- Coordinates: 33°43′54.3″S 150°26′04.2″E
- Type: Tiered
- Watercourse: Frederica Falls Creek

Frederica Falls is a multi-tiered waterfall located on the eastern side of North Lawson Park, near Lawson, Blue Mountains, New South Wales in Australia.

== History and naming ==
In either 1882 or 1883, the name Frederica Falls was assigned to the waterfall. The name Frederica comes from Effie Alice Frederica Chilvers Roberts, born 25 April 1882, who lived in Lawson with her father and respected local farmer, Benjamin Roberts. It is thought that the earliest usage of the name was on 1 March 1895, but this originated from an unverified source. In November 1910, an anonymous source reported:

"The new path between Dante's Glen and the beautiful Frederica Falls is attracting many visitors. It is considered to be one of the prettiest of many walks in the neighbourhood. It is not generally known that the Frederica Falls are named after Miss Frederica Roberts, a popular resident of Lawson, whose father owned the property many years ago. Miss Roberts at the time was an infant in arms."

== Location and features ==
Frederica Falls is located on the eastern side of North Lawson Park, and can be accessed via trail from the end of Hughes Ave or San Jose Ave. The trail spans 1.5 km (return) and takes under an hour. The falls drop into a deep pool which is suitable for swimming, although swimming should be sometimes be avoided due to heavy rain below the Great Western Highway. An alternative method to reach the falls is via the Empire Pass Loop, a 5.5 km (loop) trail beginning at the end of St Bernards Drive in North Lawson Park. The waterway itself is dog-friendly, but some parts of the Empire Pass intersect Blue Mountains National Park, where dogs are prohibited.

== See also ==
- List of waterfalls in Australia
- Lawson
- List of waterfalls
