= Gorgeous Falls =

Waterfall in Victoria, Australia

- Location within Victoria
- Location: Tanybryn, Victoria, Australia
- Coordinates: 38°37′52.428″S 143°43′47.459″E
- Type: Cascade
- Total height: 7.69 m (25.2 ft)
- Number of drops: 1
- Watercourse: Smythe Creek (West Branch)

Gorgeous Falls is a waterfall located in Tanybryn, Victoria, Australia, within the Great Otway National Park. It is located on the western branch of Smythe Creek, and is one of several nearby waterfalls within the Mousetrap Complex. Access to the waterfall by foot is extremely difficult due to its isolation, as well as being steep, making it highly dangerous. The waterfall is a singular drop, at a height of 7.69 metres.

== See also ==
- Box Canyon Falls
- Green Chasm Falls
- List of waterfalls
- List of waterfalls in Australia
- Oren Falls
