= Boundary Falls =

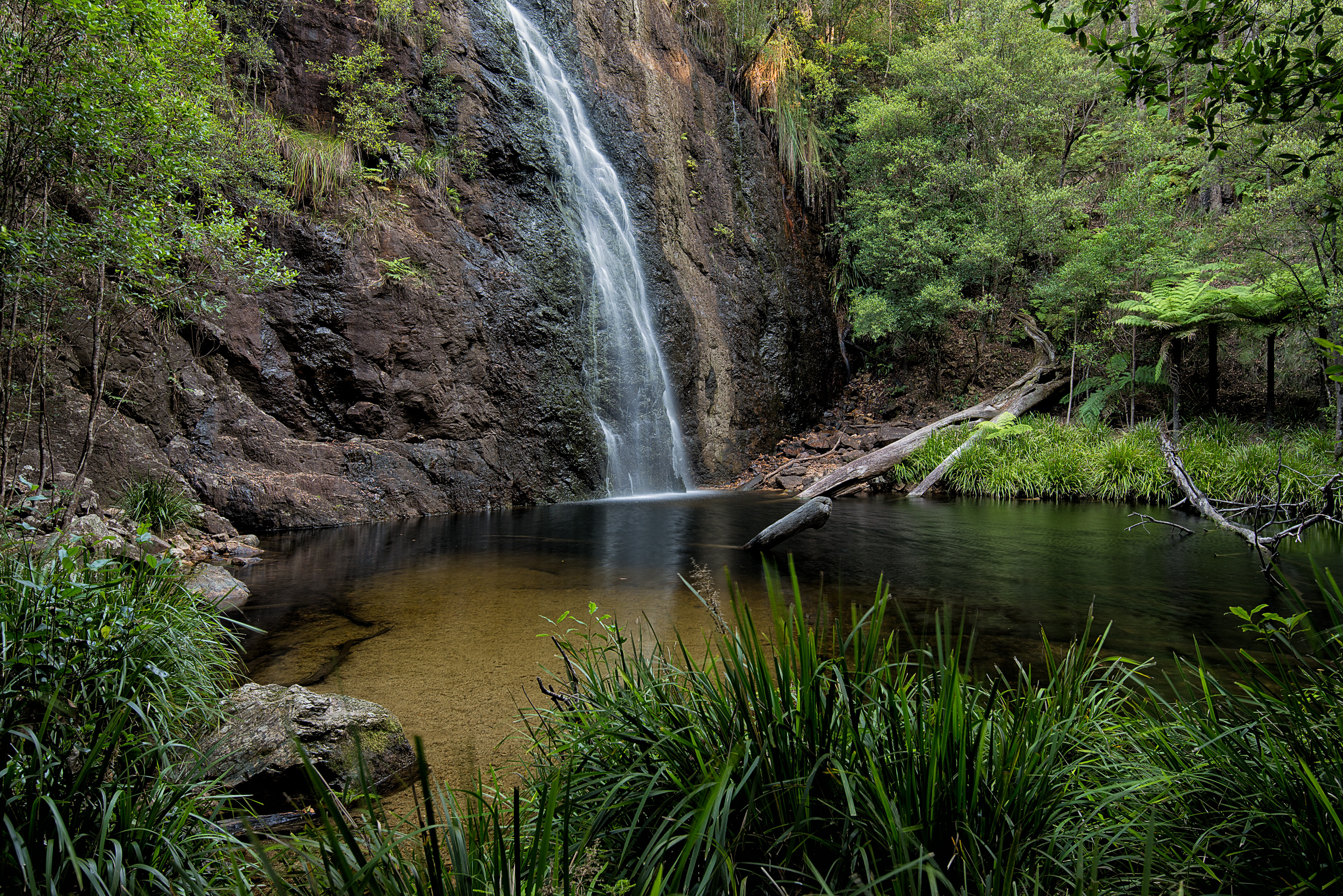
- Boundary Falls in Gibraltar Range National Park

- Location within New South Wales
- Location: Gibraltar Range National Park, New England, New South Wales, Australia
- Coordinates: 29°32′00″S 152°14′56″E

The Boundary Falls is a waterfall that is located within the Gibraltar Range National Park, adjacent to the Gwydir Highway in the New England region of New South Wales, Australia.

The falls are located approximately 63 kilometres (39 mi) east of Glen Innes and 95 kilometres (59 mi) west of Grafton, and a campsite is located nearby on the site of a former sawmill within a dry open eucalypt forest.

== See also ==
- List of waterfalls
- List of waterfalls in Australia
