= Horsetail Falls =

Horsetail Falls or Horsetail Fall may refer to the following waterfalls:

== Australia ==
- Horsetail Falls (Tasmania, Australia)

== United States ==
- Horsetail Falls (Oregon)
- Horsetail Fall (Yosemite), in California
- Horsetail Falls (California), in the Sierra Nevada mountain range
- Horsetail Falls (Montana), a waterfall of Montana
- Horsetail Falls (Alaska)

== See also ==
- List of waterfalls by type#Horsetail
