= Federal Falls (Orange) =

- Location within New South Wales
- Location: Orange, NSW
- Coordinates: 33°21′01.1″S 148°57′46.1″E

Federal Falls is a plunge waterfall, located near Orange. It is located in the Mount Canobolas State Conservation Area, and is accessed from a 4 kilometres (2.5 mi) track from the Federal Falls campground. The track is rated at a Grade 3 on the Australian Walking Track Grading System.

== See also ==
- List of waterfalls
- List of waterfalls in Australia
