= Glasgow Falls =

Waterfall in Victoria, Australia

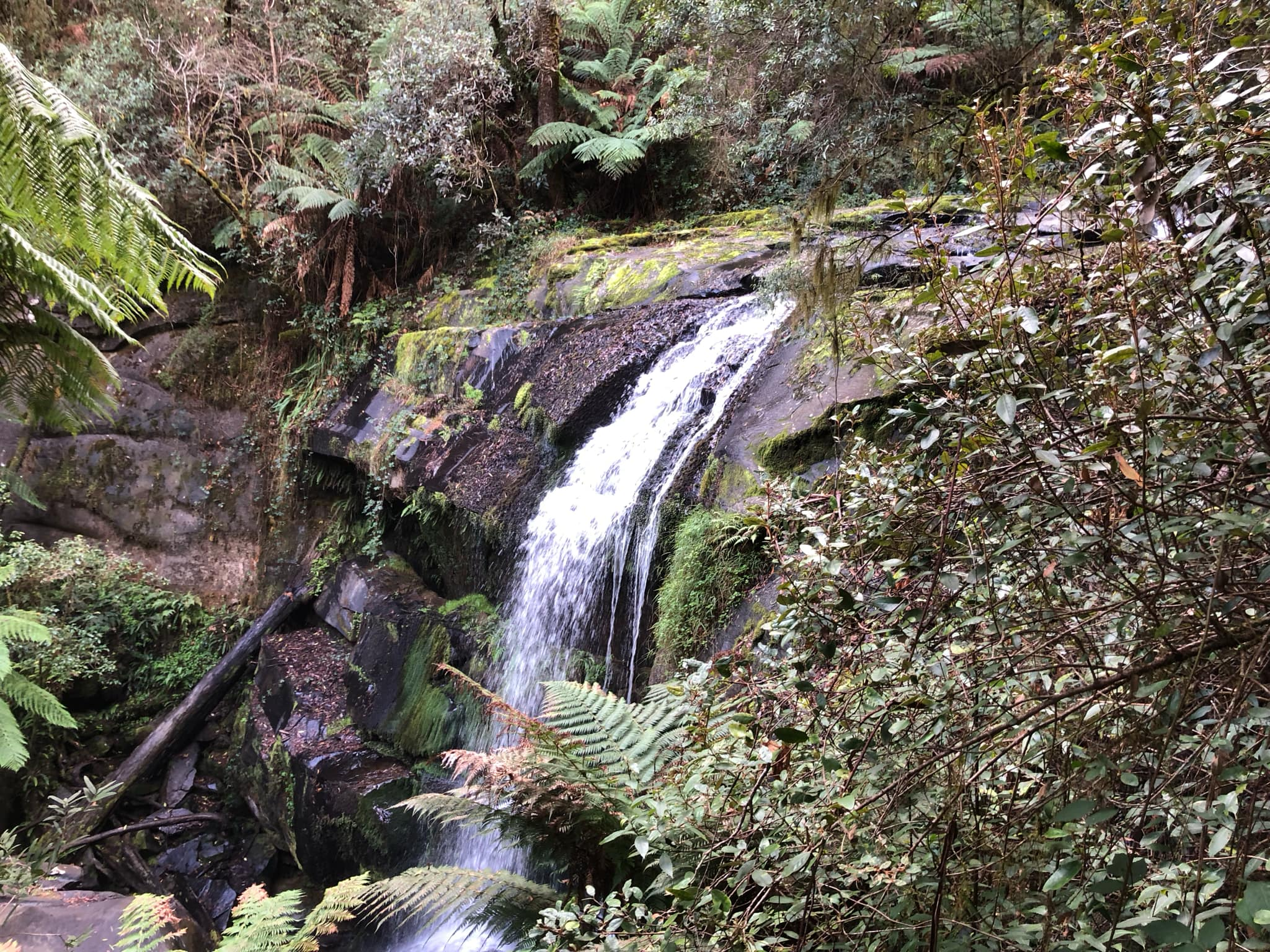
- Glasgow Falls

- Location within Victoria
- Location: Lavers Hill, Victoria, Australia
- Coordinates: 38°38′57.31102″S 143°22′5.38435″E
- Type: Cascade
- Total height: 11.87 m (38.9 ft)
- Number of drops: 1
- Watercourse: Chapple Creek

Glasgow Falls is a waterfall located in Lavers Hill, Victoria, Australia. The waterfall is likely named after Robert Glasgow, a farmer who was given a nearby lease of land in 1894. Robert was born in Warrnambool in 1867 and died in Koo Wee Rup in 1940. The waterfall contains a singular drop, and is 11.87 metres in height.

== See also ==
- List of waterfalls
- List of waterfalls in Australia
