= Balaka Falls =

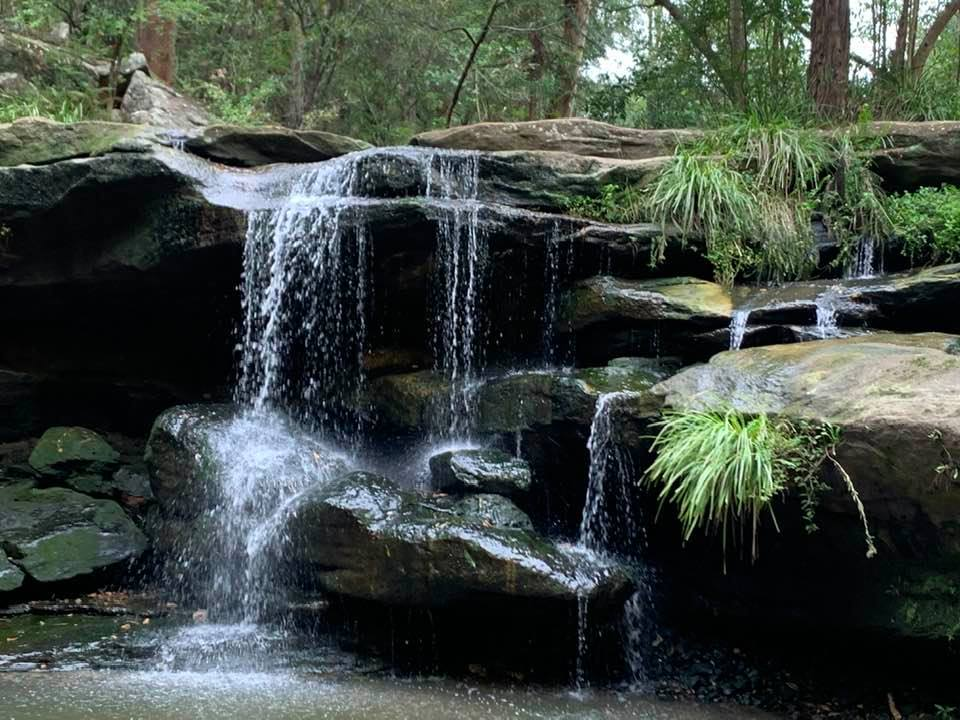

- Location within Sydney
- Location: Carlingford, New South Wales, Australia
- Coordinates: 33°46′44″S 151°01′59″EGoogle
- Type: Tiered–cascade
- Elevation: 70 metres (230 ft) AHD
- Total height: 4–5 metres (13–16 ft)
- Number of drops: 2
- Total width: 6–7 metres (20–23 ft)
- Average width: 6 metres (20 ft)
- Watercourse: Hunts Creek

Balaka Falls is a small tiered–cascade waterfall situated in the Greater Western Sydney region of Sydney, New South Wales, Australia. It is located on the Hunts Creek in Yarralumla Wildlife Sanctuary in the City of Parramatta and is surrounded by suburbia, making it accessible for nearby residential areas.

== Geography ==
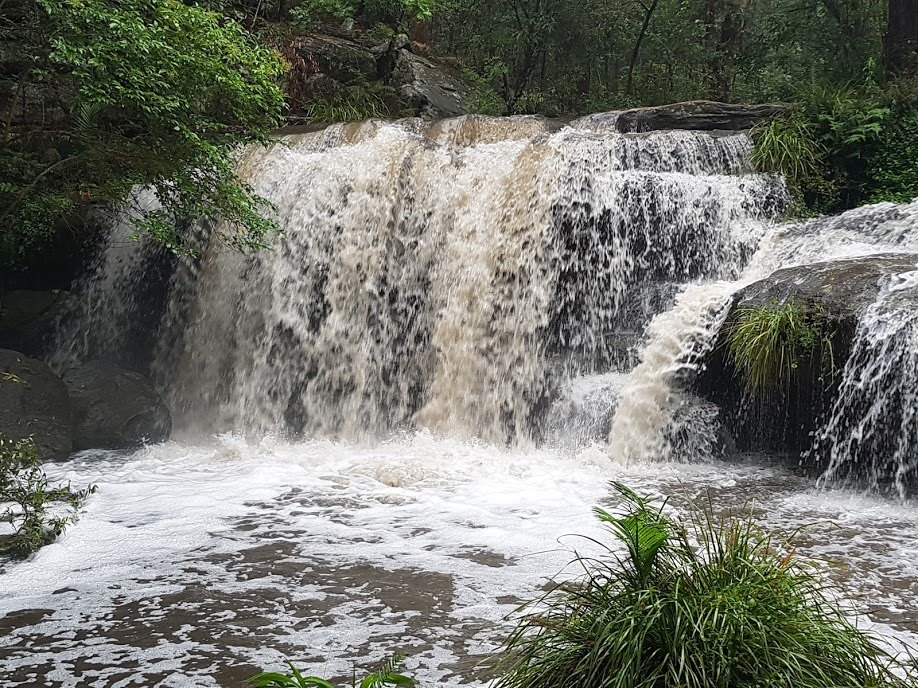
The waterfall after heavy rain.

Surrounded by a sclerophyll riparian forest and featuring sandstone rocks, the waterfall features two drops and is located on Hunts Creek. It is roughly a 30-minute drive from Sydney CBD and is situated between North Rocks and Carlingford in the northwestern suburbs. It is best visited after heavy rain events, when spectacular falls can be observed (although it is a permanent waterfall).

== Access ==
The waterfall can be accessed from the suburban streets of Ferndale Avenue and Norfolk Place in Carlingford through a 50-metre and 250 metre long walking track (which are also fire trails), respectively. A sandstone staircase, which is not pram or wheelchair friendly, leads to the bottom of the falls. There is a locator map in the vicinity to address and direct visitors to the falls and the surrounding bushland.

The M2 motorway and Cumberland Highway are major roads proximate to the falls.

== See also ==
- List of waterfalls
- List of waterfalls in Australia
