= Ellinjaa Falls =

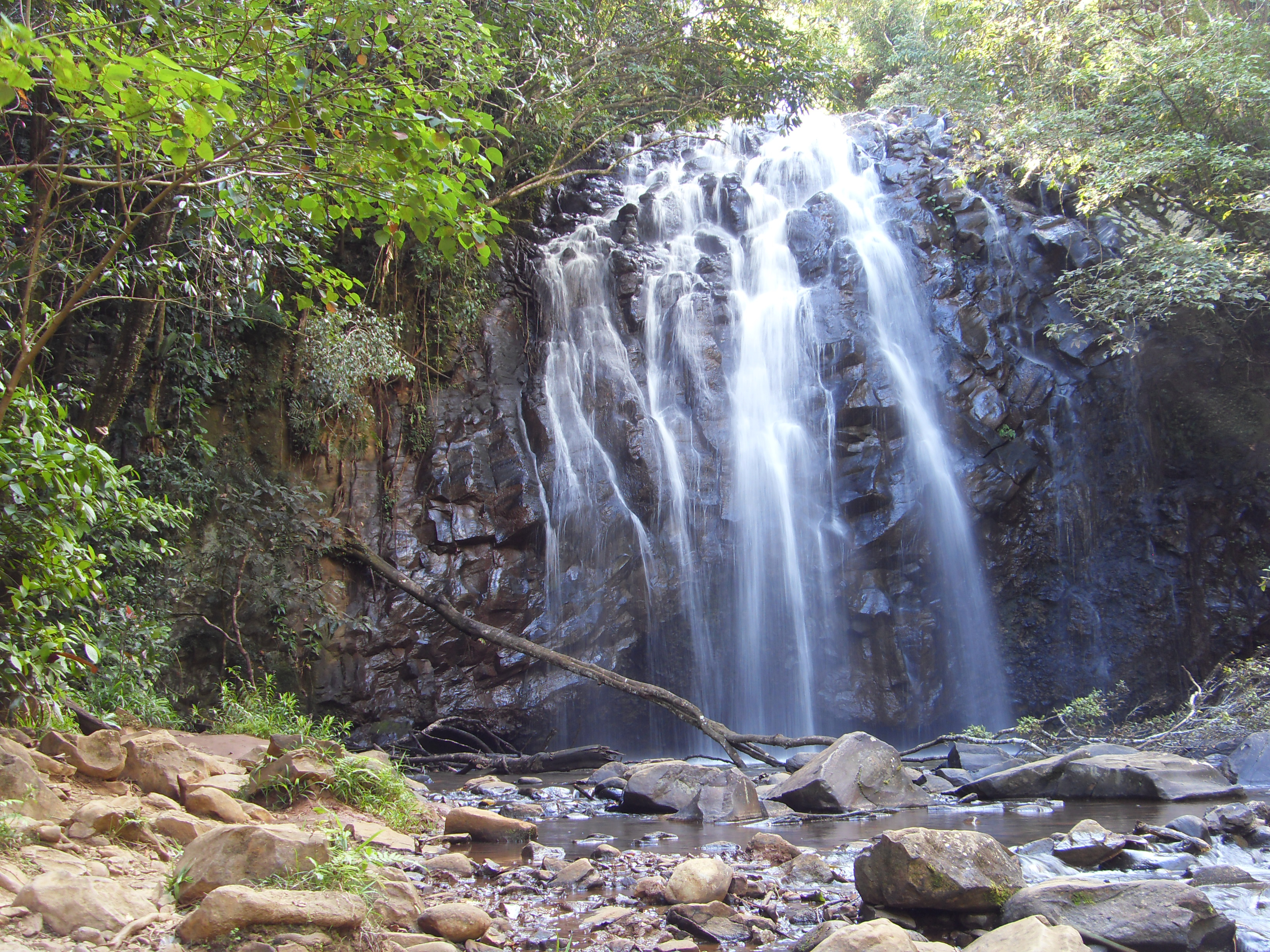
- Ellinjaa Falls

- Location within Queensland
- Location: Atherton Tableland Queensland, Australia
- Coordinates: 17°29′37″S 145°39′20″E
- Type: Ledge
- Number of drops: 1
- Watercourse: Ellinjaa Creek

The Ellinjaa Falls is a ledge waterfall that is located on Ellinjaa Creek, on the Atherton Tableland in the North region of Queensland, Australia.

== Location and features ==
The falls are located on Ellinjaa Creek, and are approximately seven kilometers (ten minute drive) from Millaa Millaa. Access to the base of the falls is via a walking track leading from the picnic area and carpark on Theresa Creek Road.

== See also ==
- List of waterfalls
- List of waterfalls in Australia
