= Guide Falls =

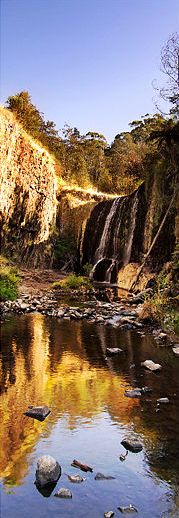
- Guide Falls, in summer 2007.

- Location within Tasmania
- Location: North West Tasmania, Australia
- Coordinates: 41°09′00″S 145°48′00″E
- Type: Tiered–cascade
- Elevation: 187 metres (614 ft) AHD
- Total height: 22–38 metres (72–125 ft)
- Watercourse: Guide River

The Guide Falls and Upper Guide Falls, a tiered–cascade waterfall on the Guide River, is located in the North West region of Tasmania, Australia.

Guide Falls

== Location and features ==
The waterfalls are situated about 19 km south of Burnie at an elevation of 187 metres (614 ft) above sea level and descend in the range of 22–38 metres (72–125 ft).

== See also ==
- List of waterfalls
- List of waterfalls in Australia
