= Black Banksia Falls =

- Location within New South Wales
- Location: Central Tablelands, New South Wales, Australia
- Coordinates: 33°56′55″S 150°01′04″E

The Black Banksia Falls is a waterfall that is located within the Kanangra-Boyd National Park in the Central Tablelands region of New South Wales, Australia.

== See also ==
- List of waterfalls
- List of waterfalls in Australia
