= Morans Falls =

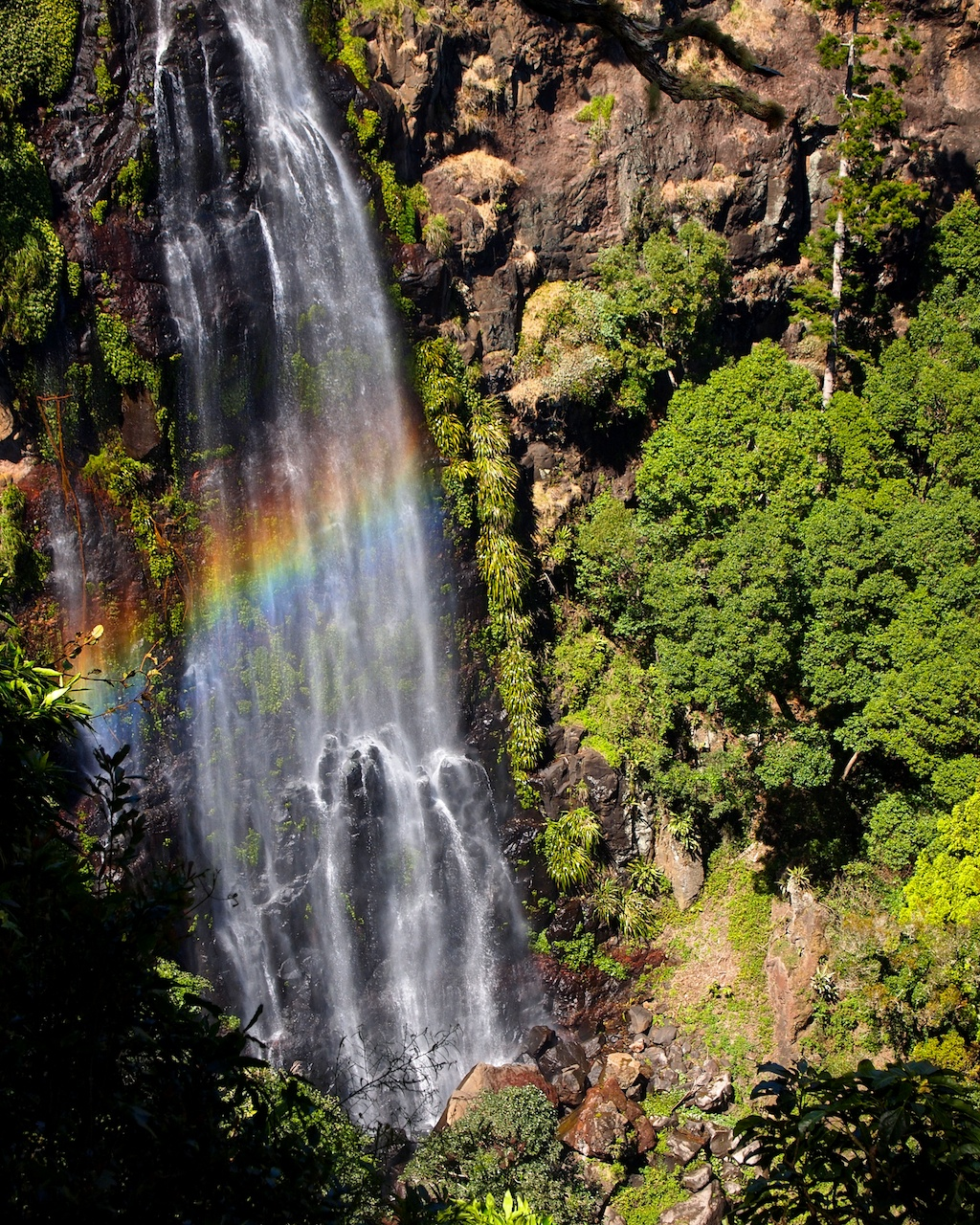
- Morans Falls

- Location within Queensland
- Location: South East Queensland, Australia
- Coordinates: 28°13′50″S 153°07′29″E
- Type: Plunge
- Total height: 80 metres (260 ft)
- Number of drops: 1
- Watercourse: Morans Creek

The Morans Falls, a plunge waterfall on Morans Creek, is located in the UNESCO World Heritage–listed Gondwana Rainforests in the South East region of Queensland, Australia.

== Location and features ==
The waterfall is situated within Lamington National Park in the Green Mountains, part of the Shield Volcano Group in the Scenic Rim of the Gondwana Rainforests and can be accessed via the Morans Falls Track, a 4.4-kilometre (2.7 mi) return walking track.

== See also ==
- List of waterfalls
- List of waterfalls in Australia
