= Box Canyon Falls =

Waterfall in Victoria, Australia

- Location within Victoria
- Location: Tanybryn, Victoria, Australia
- Coordinates: 38°38′0.708″S 143°43′40.547″E
- Type: Cascade
- Total height: 12.03 m (39.5 ft)
- Number of drops: 1
- Watercourse: Smythe Creek (West Branch)

Box Canyon Falls is a waterfall located in Tanybryn, Victoria, Australia, within the Great Otway National Park. It is located on the course of the western branch of Smythe Creek, and is part of the Mousetrap Waterfall Complex, a series of isolated waterfalls in close proximity to one another. The name derives from the shape of the canyon of which the waterfall has carved out, resembling a box. The waterfall is a singular drop, and is at a height of 12.03 metres.

== See also ==
- Green Chasm Falls
- Gorgeous Falls
- List of waterfalls
- List of waterfalls in Australia
- Oren Falls
