= Oren Falls =

Waterfall in Victoria, Australia

OREN Falls
- Location within Victoria
- Location: Tanybryn, Victoria, Australia
- Coordinates: 38°38′0.708″S 143°43′25.572″E
- Type: Cascade
- Total height: 5.95 m (19.5 ft)
- Number of drops: 1
- Watercourse: Smythe Creek (West Branch)

Oren Falls or OREN Falls is a waterfall located in the locality of Tanybryn, Victoria, Australia, one of several waterfalls in the Mousetrap Complex. OREN is an abbreviation for the "Otway Ranges Environmental Network". The waterfall, and subsequent Mousetrap Complex waterfalls are located in an isolated tract of forest below Haines Junction. It contains a singular drop, and a height of 5.95 metres.

== See also ==
- Box Canyon Falls
- Green Chasm Falls
- Gorgeous Falls
- List of waterfalls
- List of waterfalls in Australia
