= Newell Falls =

- Location within New South Wales
- Location: New England, New South Wales, Australia
- Coordinates: 30°23′55″S 152°45′35″E
- Watercourse: unnamed stream

The Newell Falls is a waterfall on an unnamed stream that is located in the New England region of New South Wales, Australia.

== Location and features ==
The waterfall is situated adjacent to the Waterfall Way between the town of Dorrigo and the locality of Thora in Dorrigo National Park. The waterfall passes down the cliff side and under a single lane bridge before entering the Bellinger River at the bottom of the valley. People can also stop to view the waterfall at small rest area, around 50 metres (160 ft) from the Newell Falls. Picnic tables, shelter sheds and bins are located at this site. There is also a near Newell Falls lookout into the Bellinger Valley.

The Waterfall Way often closes at Newell Falls in times of heavy rainfall and flooding as the road becomes a shower of water and visibility is significantly reduced.

== History ==
The Newell Falls were named after Hugh Newell, who had served as New South Wales Commissioner for Main Roads from 1932 to his death in 1941. He was described as "one of the foremost road-building experts in the Commonwealth". On Saturday 6 December 1941 a memorial tablet for Newell was unveiled by Mr D. Craig, the new Commissioner for Main Road at the lookout on the Waterfall Way (30.3947°S 152.7459°E).

== See also ==
- List of waterfalls
- List of waterfalls in Australia
