= Delaneys Falls =

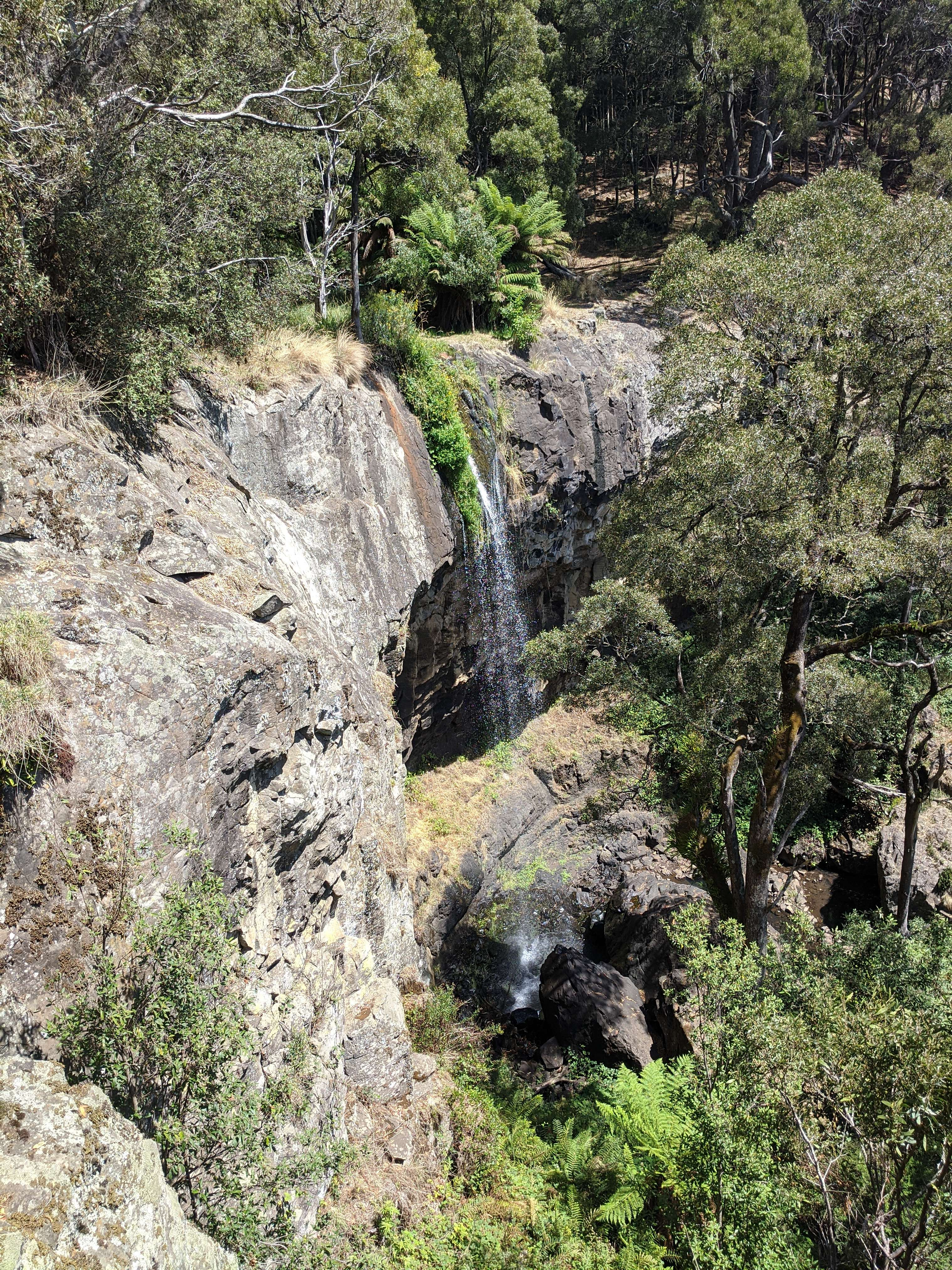
- Delaneys Falls, February 2020

- Location within Tasmania
- Location: North West Tasmania, Australia
- Coordinates: 41°16′48″S 146°03′36″E
- Type: Plunge
- Total height: 25 metres (82 ft)
- Number of drops: 3

The Delaneys Falls, also named Preston Falls, is a plunge waterfall on Preston Creek. It is located in the North West region of Tasmania, Australia.

== Location and features ==
The waterfall descends from the a ridge above the Gunns Plains, and descends approximately 25 metres (82 ft) and flows into the Leven River near the village of Gunns Plains. The falls is signposted as Preston Falls. There is a well kept walking track from the ridge down to the lookout. It's also possible to walk to the base; however there is no formalised track.

Delaneys Falls, Preston, Tasmania

== See also ==
- List of waterfalls
- List of waterfalls in Australia
