= First Falls (City of Burnside, South Australia) =

- Location within South Australia
- Location: Mount Lofty Ranges, South Australia
- Coordinates: 34°58′14″S 138°40′53″E
- Type: Cascade

The First Falls, a cascade waterfall on an unnamed watercourse, is located in the Mount Lofty Ranges region in the Australian state of South Australia.

Situated within the Cleland National Park, the First Falls are the first of a series of seven waterfalls in Waterfall Gully, south-east of the Adelaide city centre.

== See also ==
- List of waterfalls
- List of waterfalls in Australia
