= Milmilgee Falls =

- Location within Queensland
- Location: Far North Queensland, Australia
- Coordinates: 16°58′20″S 145°39′50″E
- Elevation: 377 metres (1,237 ft)
- Total height: 29–53 metres (95–174 ft)
- Watercourse: Freshwater Creek

The Milmilgee Falls, a waterfall on the Freshwater Creek, is located in the Far North region of Queensland, Australia.

== Location and features ==
From the plateau of the Atherton Tableland at an elevation of 377 metres (1,237 ft) above sea level, the falls descend between 29–53 metres (95–174 ft) and are situated below the Copperlode Falls Dam; approximately 9 kilometres (5.6 mi) west of Cairns.

== See also ==
- List of waterfalls
- List of waterfalls in Australia
