= Horsetail Falls (Tasmania, Australia) =

Waterfall in Tasmania, Australia

Coordinates: 42.079°S 145.586°E

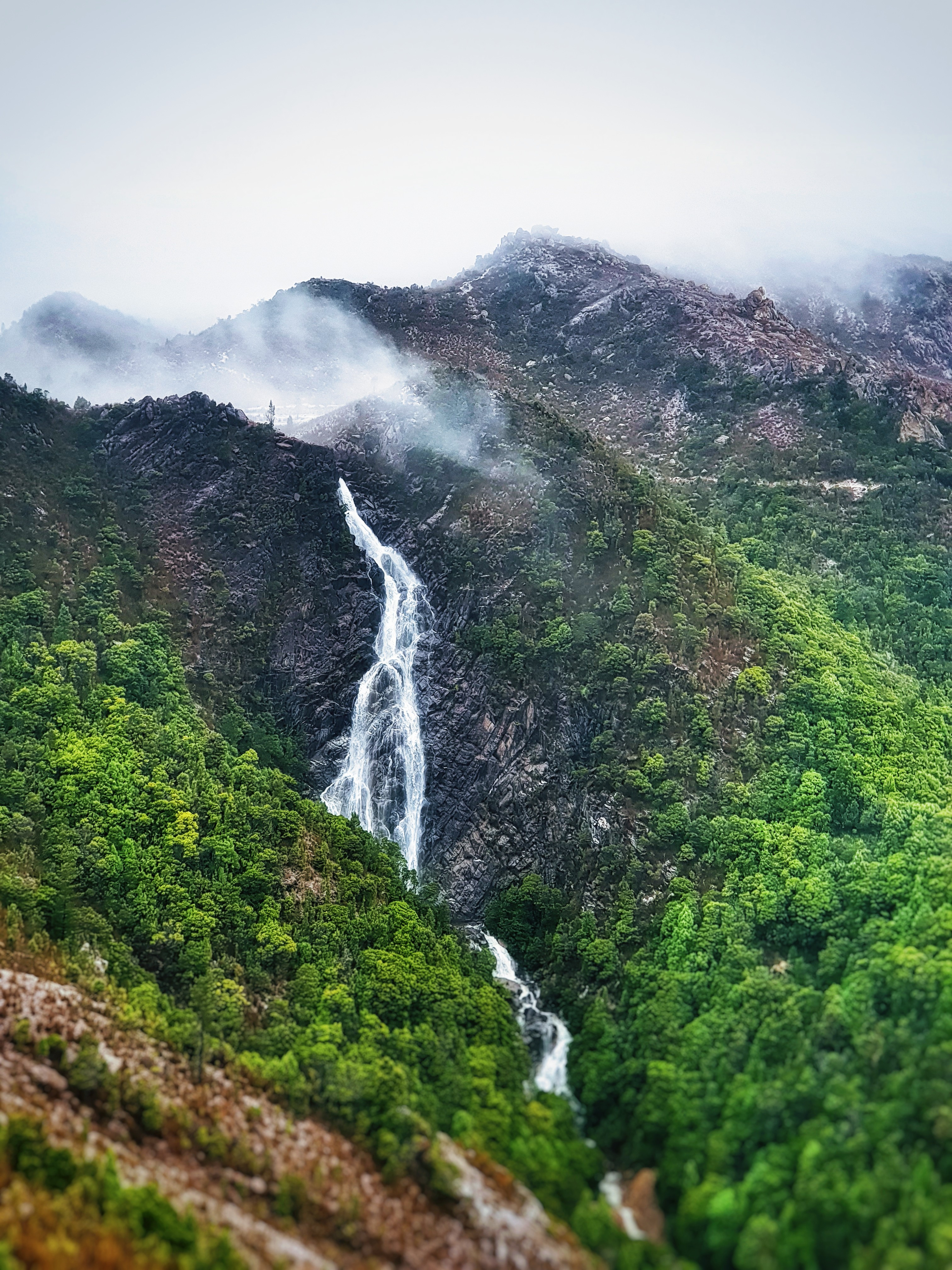
Horsetail falls in winter 2021

Horsetail Falls is a seasonal waterfall near Queenstown, Tasmania. The falls cascades over 50 metres down a steep cliff face, and can be seen from the road. A boardwalk giving closer access was opened in 2017.

== See also ==
- List of waterfalls
- List of waterfalls in Australia
