= Crystal Cascades =

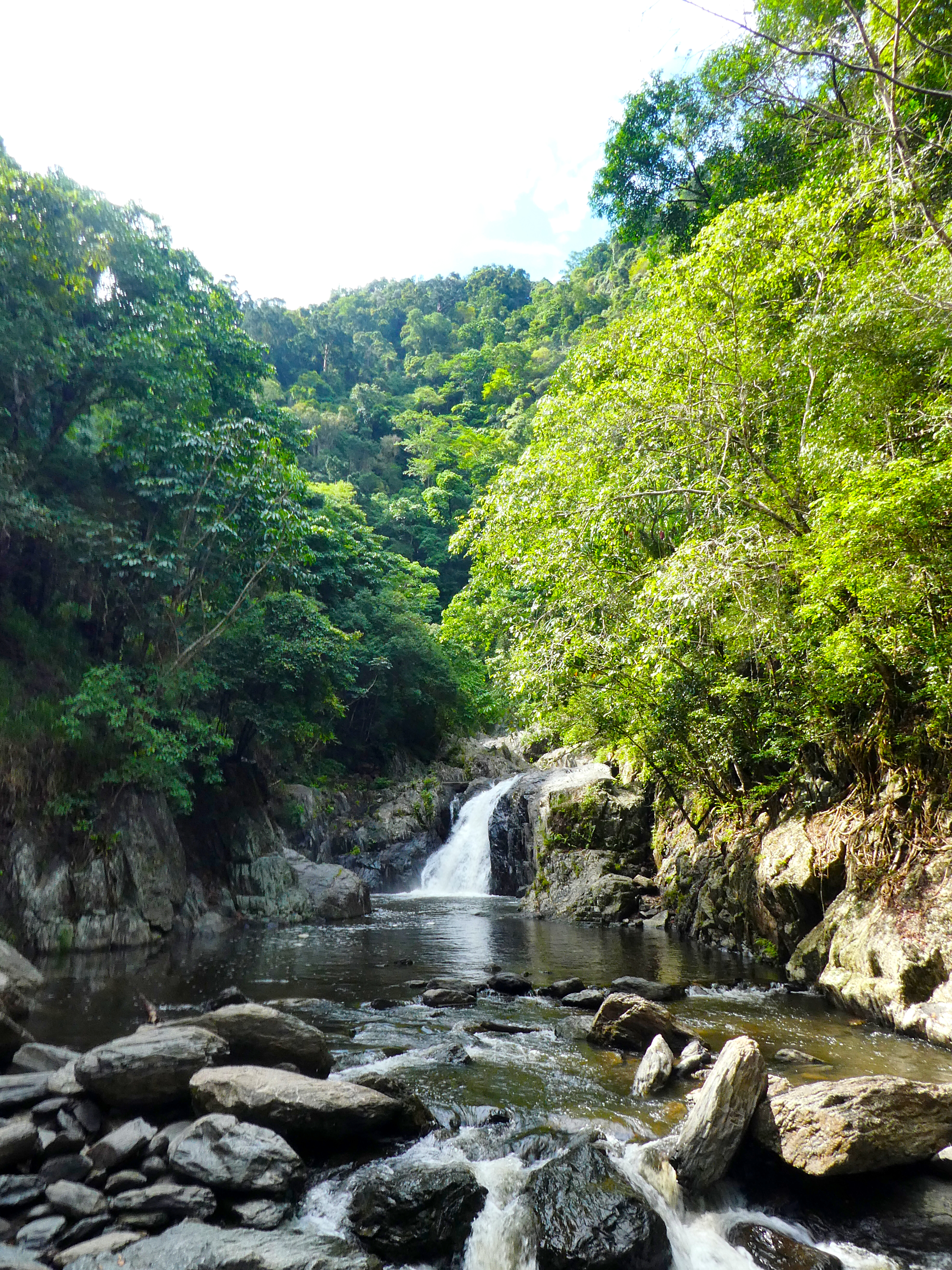

- Location within Queensland
- Location: Far North Queensland, Australia
- Coordinates: 16°57′42″S 145°40′46″E
- Type: Cascade
- Watercourse: Freshwater Creek

Crystal Cascades is a section of Freshwater Creek in the upper Redlynch Valley near Cairns, Queensland, Australia. The area features numerous cascade waterfalls and swimming holes in a rainforest habitat, with easy access via a concrete walking track.

== Location and features ==
Crystal Cascades is located in a relatively unspoilt section of upper Freshwater Creek, in Redlynch Valley west of Cairns, with numerous waterfalls and swimming waterholes popular with locals and tourists. Facilities include picnic shelters with electric barbeques, a toilet block and a walking track.

The largest waterhole is sited alongside a sheer cliff which locals and tourists climb to jump into the adjoining deep waterhole. A part of the cliff is called "No Fear", and is the highest perch from which to jump. In 2014 an 18 year old male drowned when he failed to resurface after slipping over the edge of the waterfall, while swimming in a restricted area.

== See also ==
- List of waterfalls
- List of waterfalls of Queensland
