= First Falls (Adelaide Hills, South Australia) =

- Location within South Australia
- Location: Adelaide Hills, South Australia
- Coordinates: 34°54′23″S 138°42′29″E
- Type: Plunge
- Total height: 30 metres (98 ft)
- Watercourse: Fourth Creek

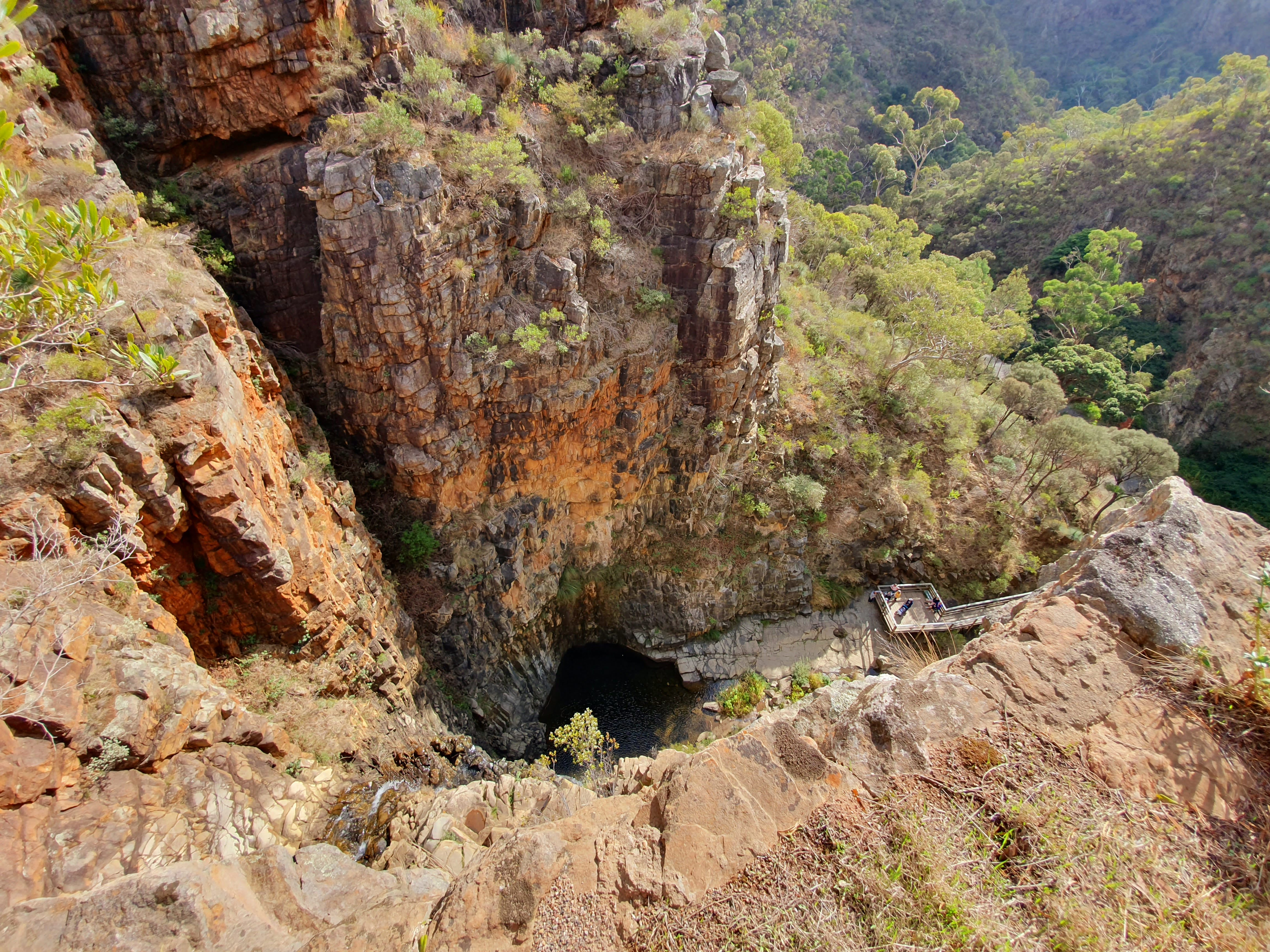
First Falls in Morialta Conservation Park, Adelaide Hills.

The First Falls, a plunge waterfall on the Fourth Creek, is located in the Adelaide Hills region in the Australian state of South Australia.

Situated within the Morialta Conservation Park, the First Falls are the first of a series of three waterfalls that are located approximately 10 kilometres (6.2 mi) northeast of the Adelaide city centre.

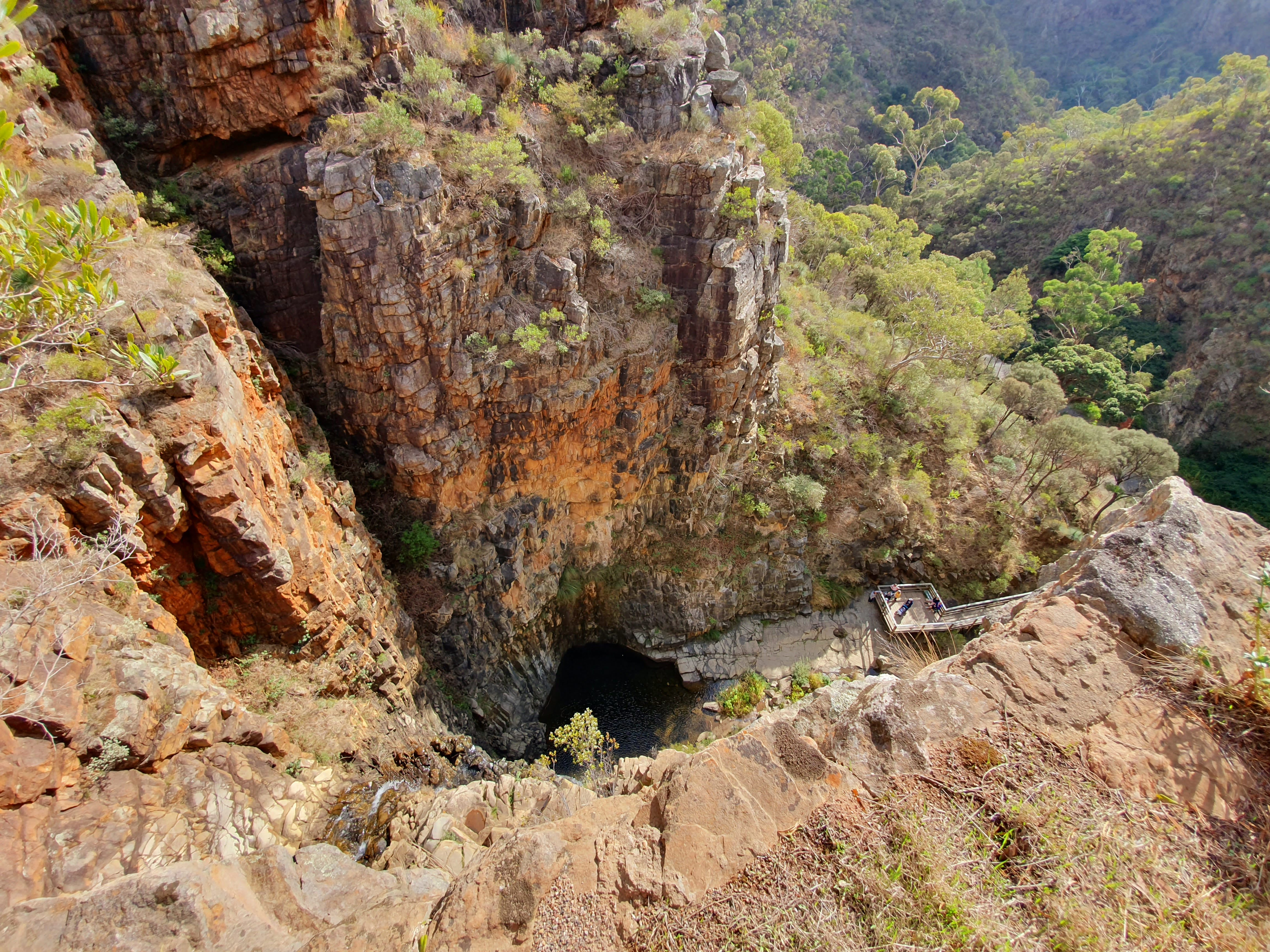
First Falls in Morialta Conservation Park

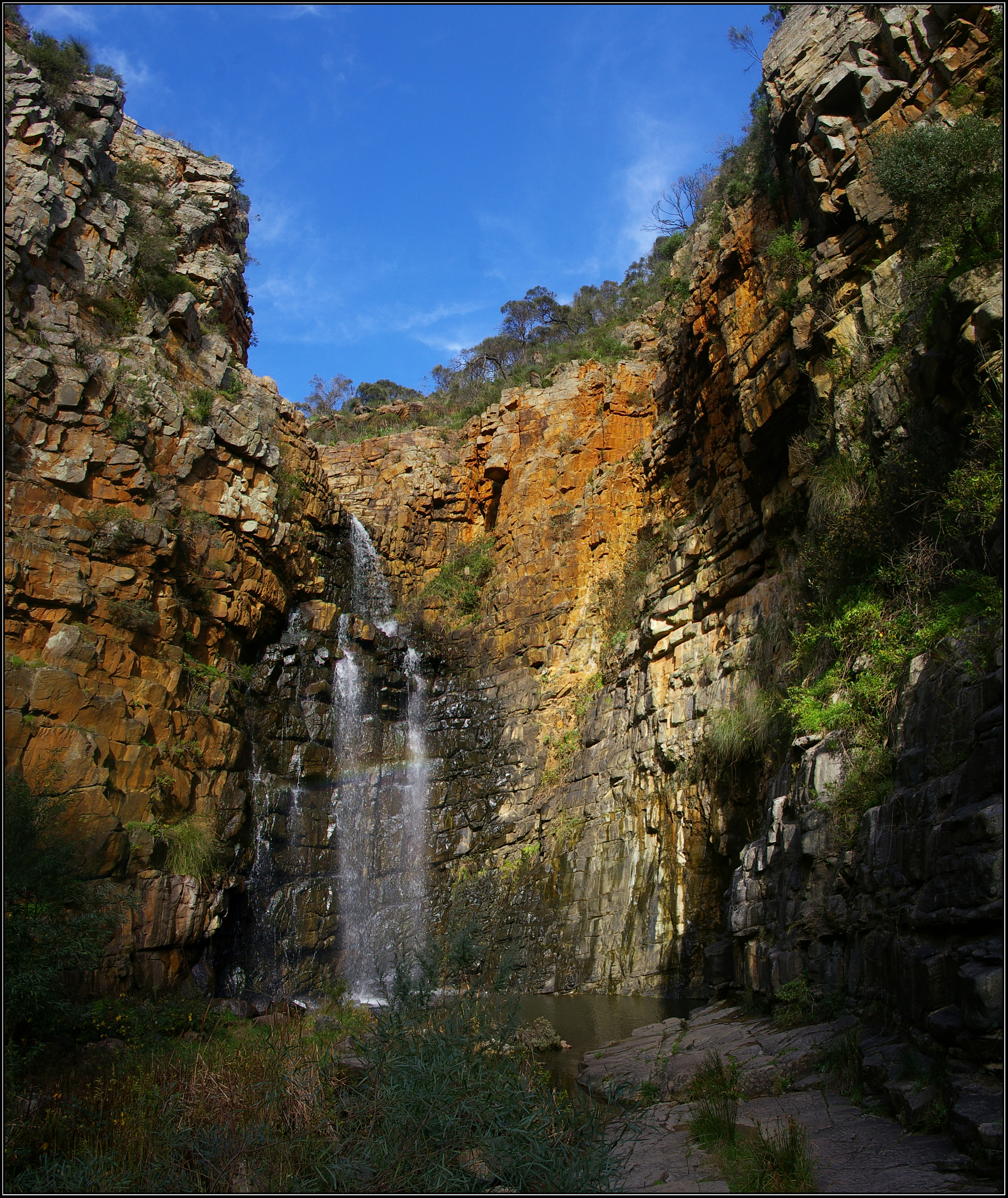
First Falls, Morialta Conservation Park

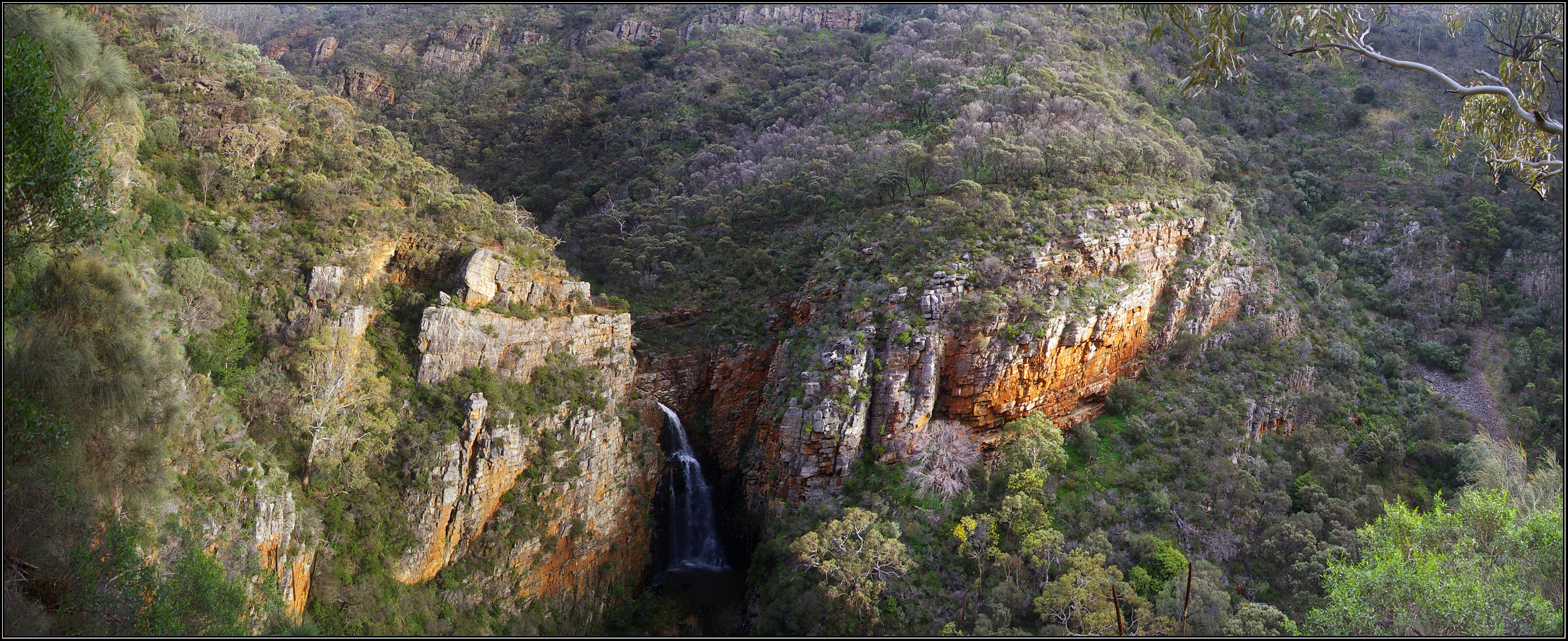
Panorama photo of Morialta Conservation Park, including falls.

== See also ==
- List of waterfalls
- List of waterfalls in Australia
