= Dorrigo National Park =

National park in New South Wales

- IUCN category II (national park)
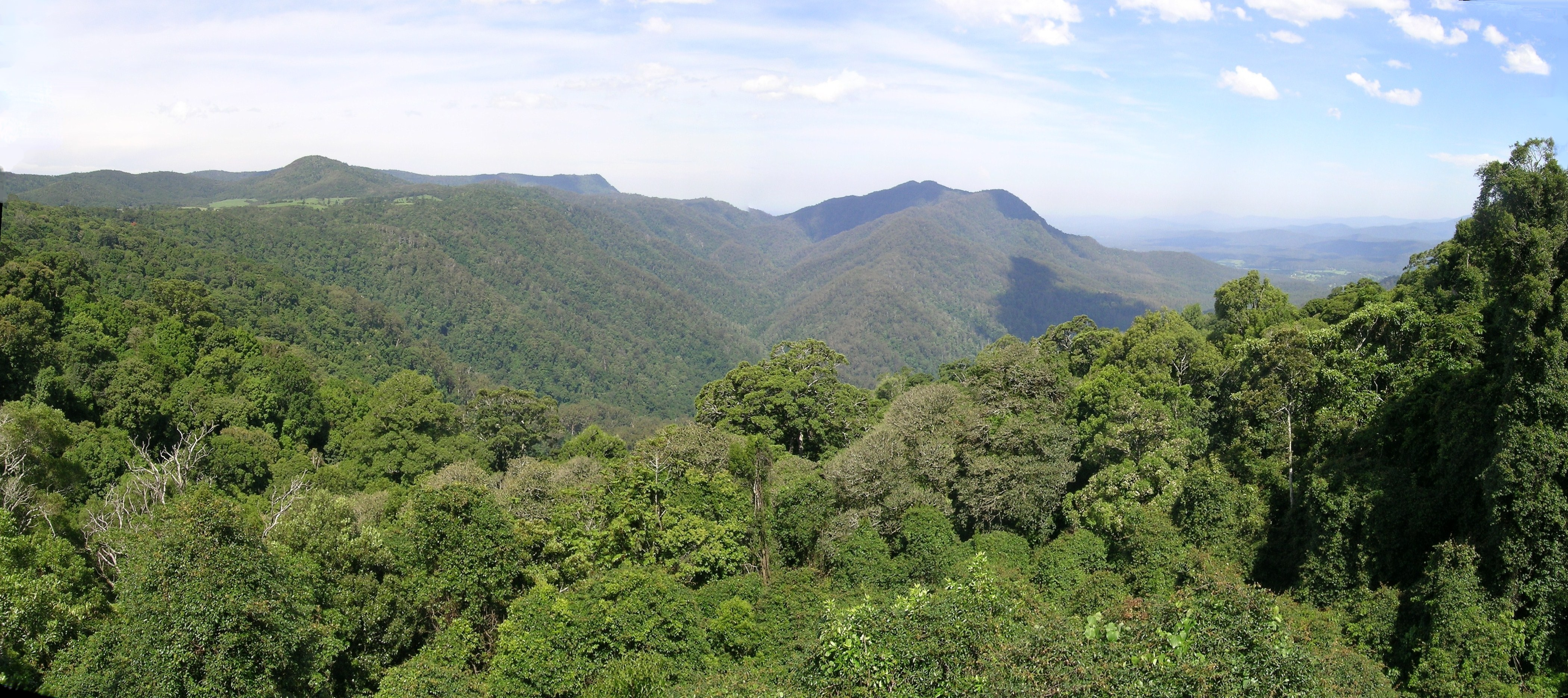
- View from the Skywalk, Dorrigo National Park

- Location within New South Wales
- Location: New South Wales
- Nearest city: Dorrigo
- Coordinates: 30°20′53″S 152°49′19″E
- Area: 119 km^{2} (46 sq mi)
- Established: 1 October 1967
- Governing body: National Parks and Wildlife Service (New South Wales)
- Website: Official website

Dorrigo National Park is a national park in New South Wales, Australia, 580 kilometres (360 mi) north of Sydney on Dome Road off the Waterfall Way, 5 kilometres (3.1 mi) east of the town of Dorrigo.

== History ==
Dorrigo National Park lies within Gumbaynggirr country and has great significance to the Gumbaynggir people.

The park is part of the New England Group of the World Heritage Site Gondwana Rainforests of Australia inscribed in 1986 and added to the Australian National Heritage List in 2007. The area protected by the park is recognised for its exceptional natural beauty with significant habitats of outstanding value to science and conservation.

Since 2019, the NSW Government is developing a new visitor centre called the Dorrigo Arc Rainforest Centre and a 46km Dorrigo Escarpment Great Walk, as of 2023 construction had not begun.

== Geography ==
The park sits on a plateau, so there are a large number of waterfalls in the area. The northern region of the park is more mountainous with the south being only slightly hilly.

== Biology ==
As a rainforest, Dorrigo National Park has high biodiversity. There are approximately 30 mammals, 128 birds, and 44 reptiles and amphibians.

Marsupials such as the red-necked pademelon can be found there.

Its birdlife is especially of note, the rainforest is home to species such as the wompoo fruit dove, the regent bowerbird, and the superb lyrebird.

== Features ==
One of the main entrances to the National Park is the Dorrigo Rainforest Centre and the adjoining Canopy Cafe. The Rainforest Centre is a major CERRA interpretation centre. The interactive display, The Rainforest Revealed, explains how the rainforest evolved and gives insights into the animal and plant species that live there.

Several tracks in the park allow hikers to view the park's waterfalls and vistas to the coastal plain. A notable feature of the park is the Skywalk, an elevated walkway through and above the treetops, providing birdwatchers with an excellent view of local bird life.

== Gallery ==
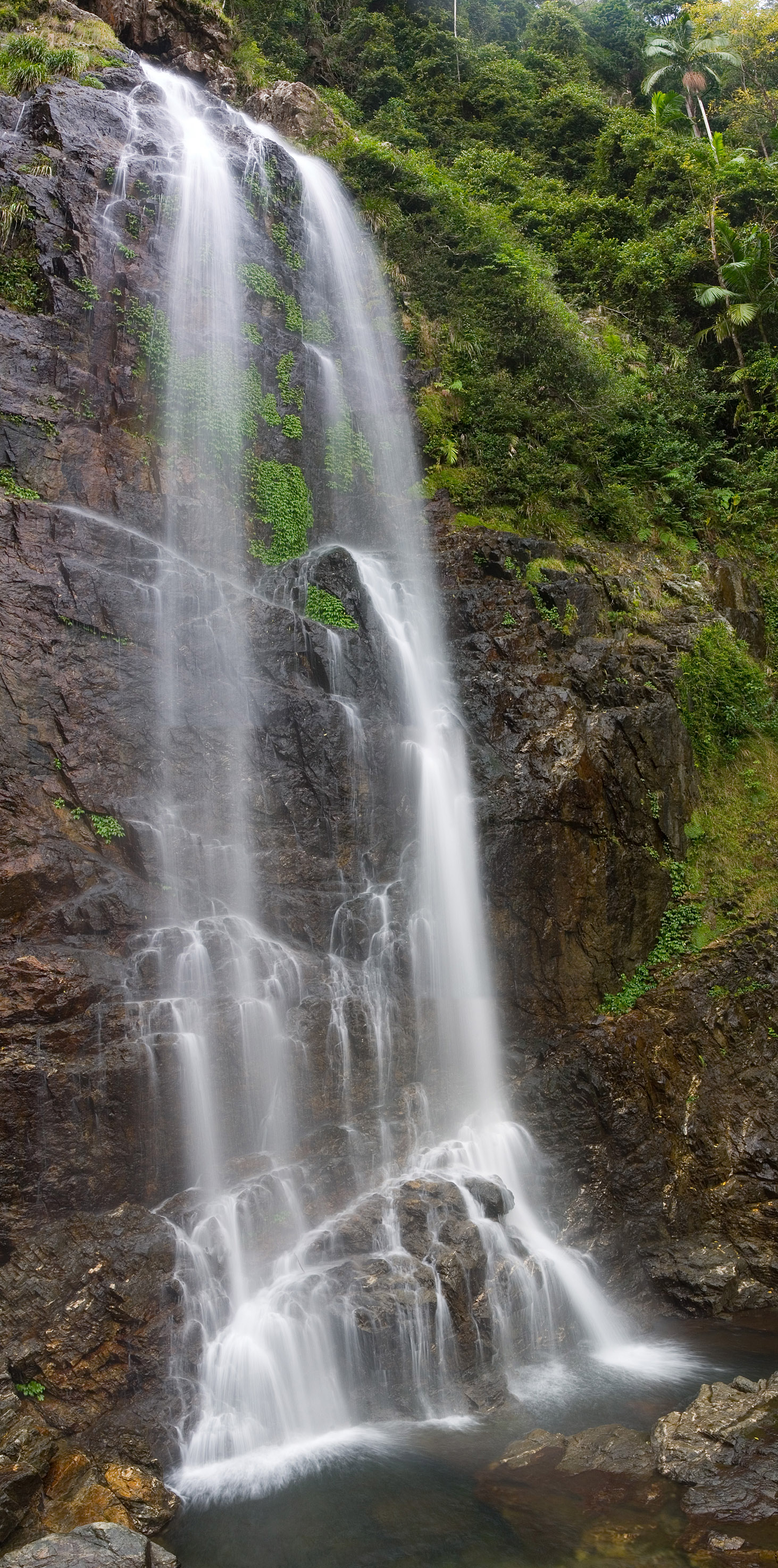
Red Cedar Falls on the Rosewood Creek Track

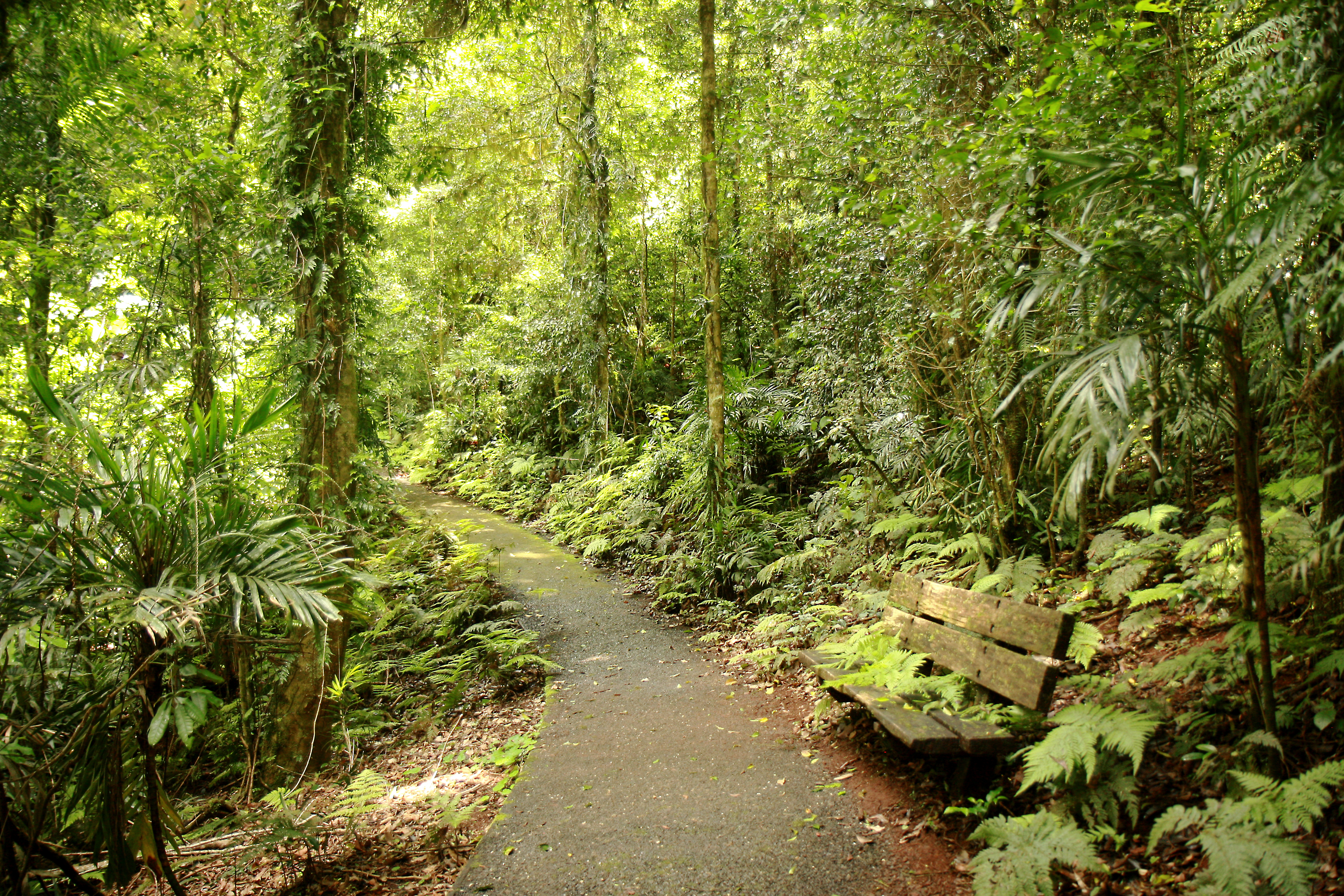
Wonga Walk rainforest

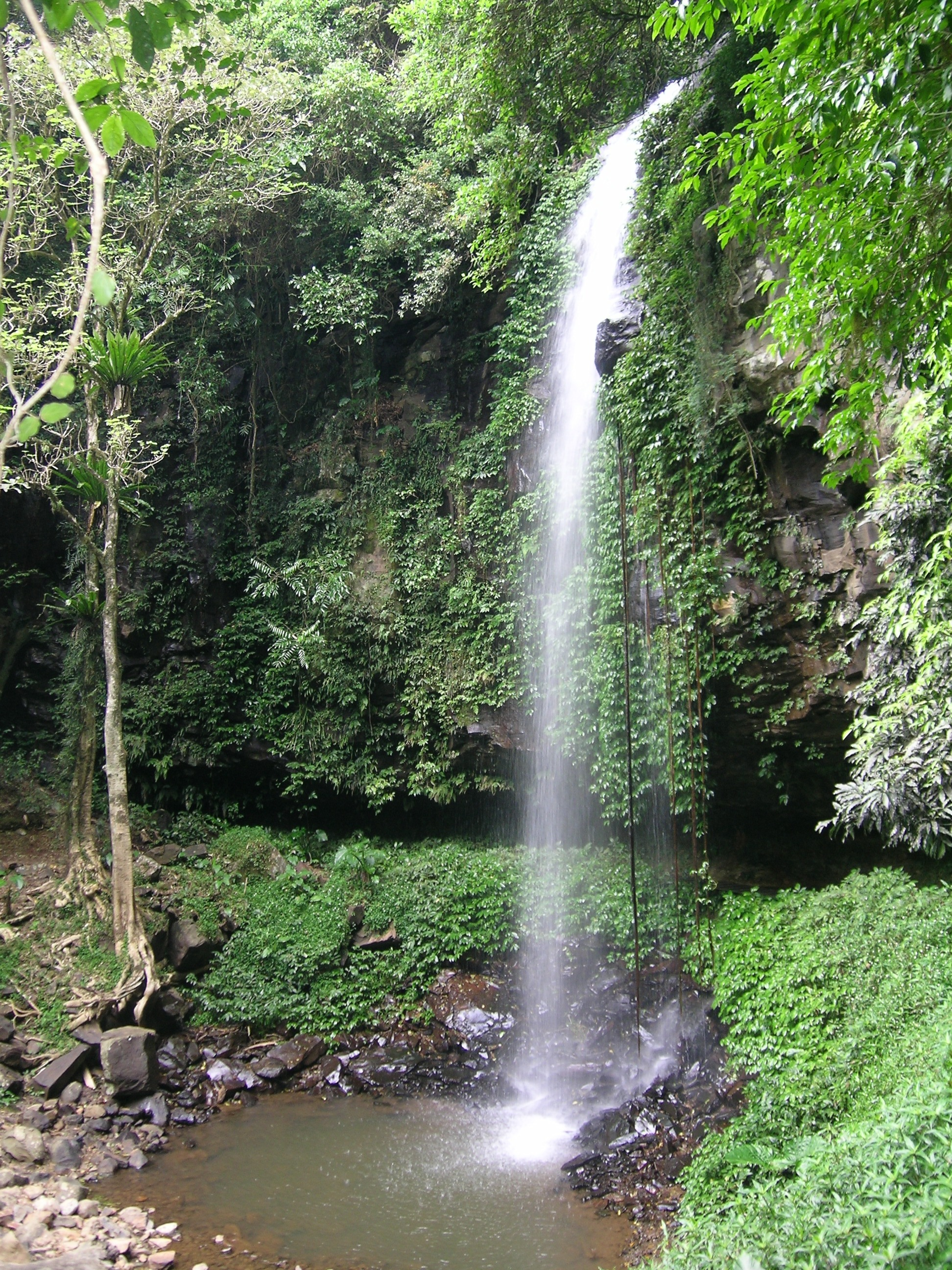
Crystal Falls on Wonga Walk

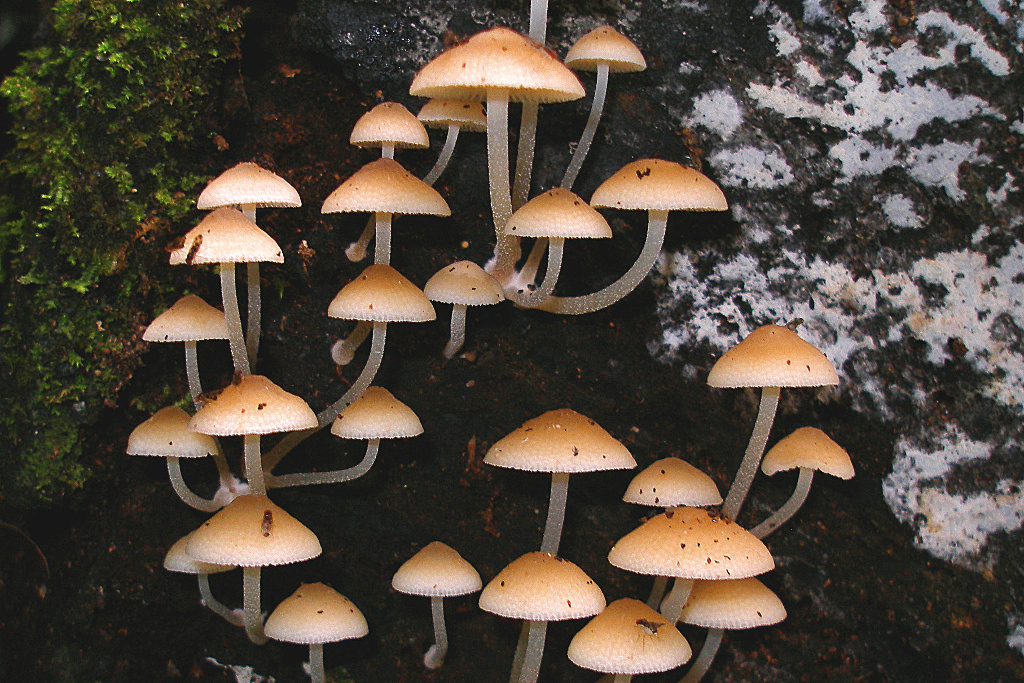
Mushrooms on Wonga Walk

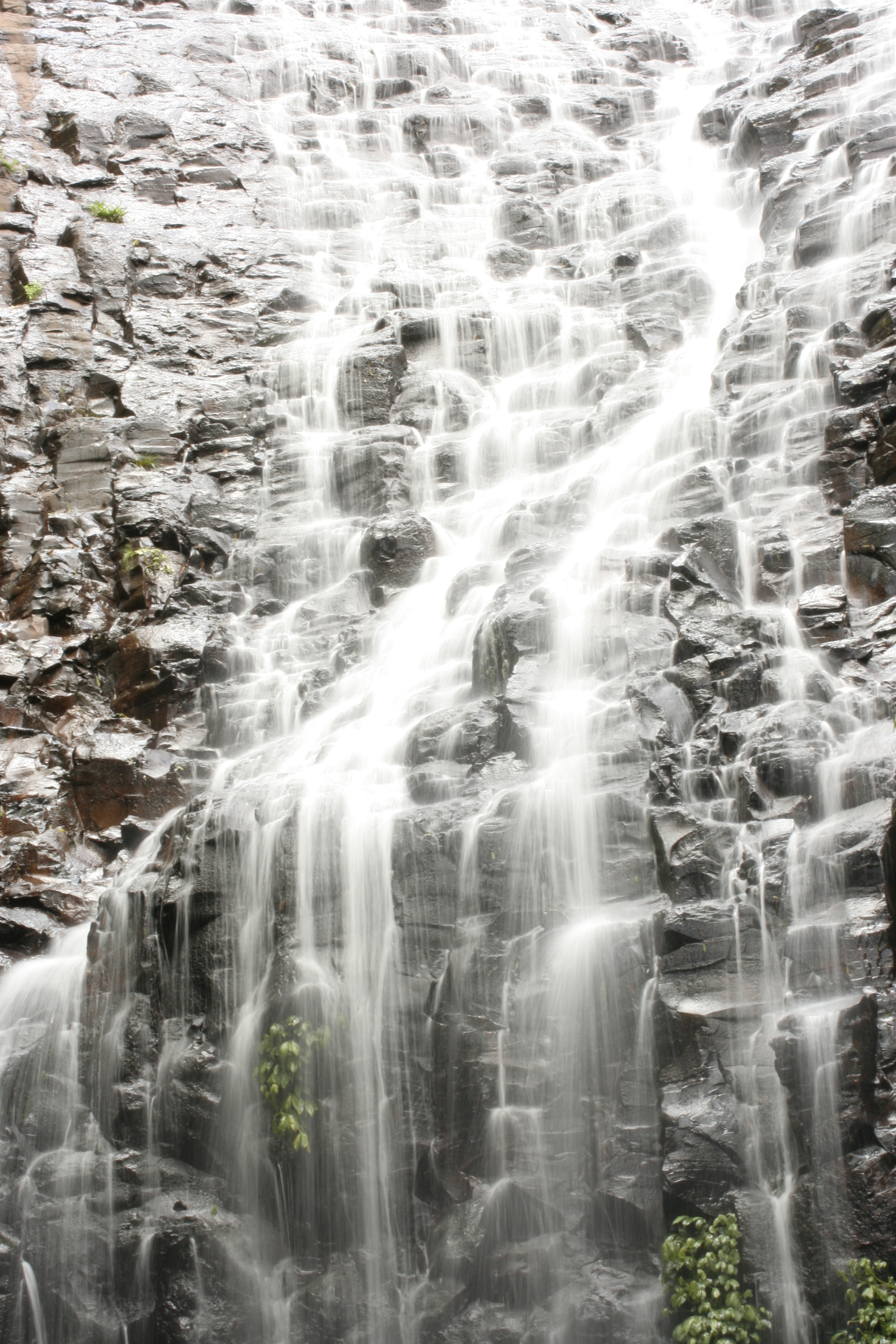
Tristania Falls on Wonga Walk

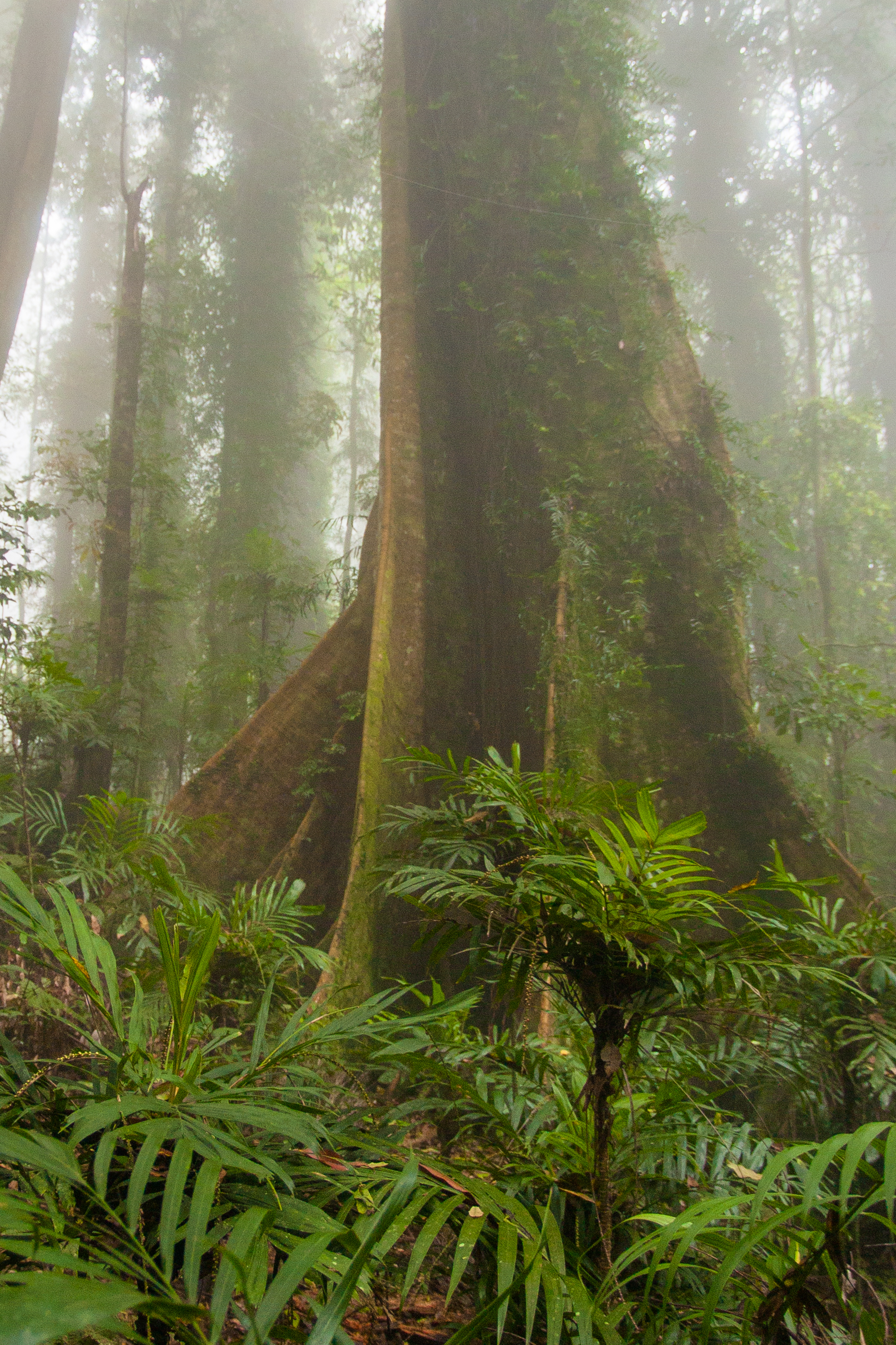
Rainforest

== See also ==
- Protected areas of New South Wales
