= Redwoods of the Otway Ranges =

Grove of Coast redwoods in Victoria, Australia

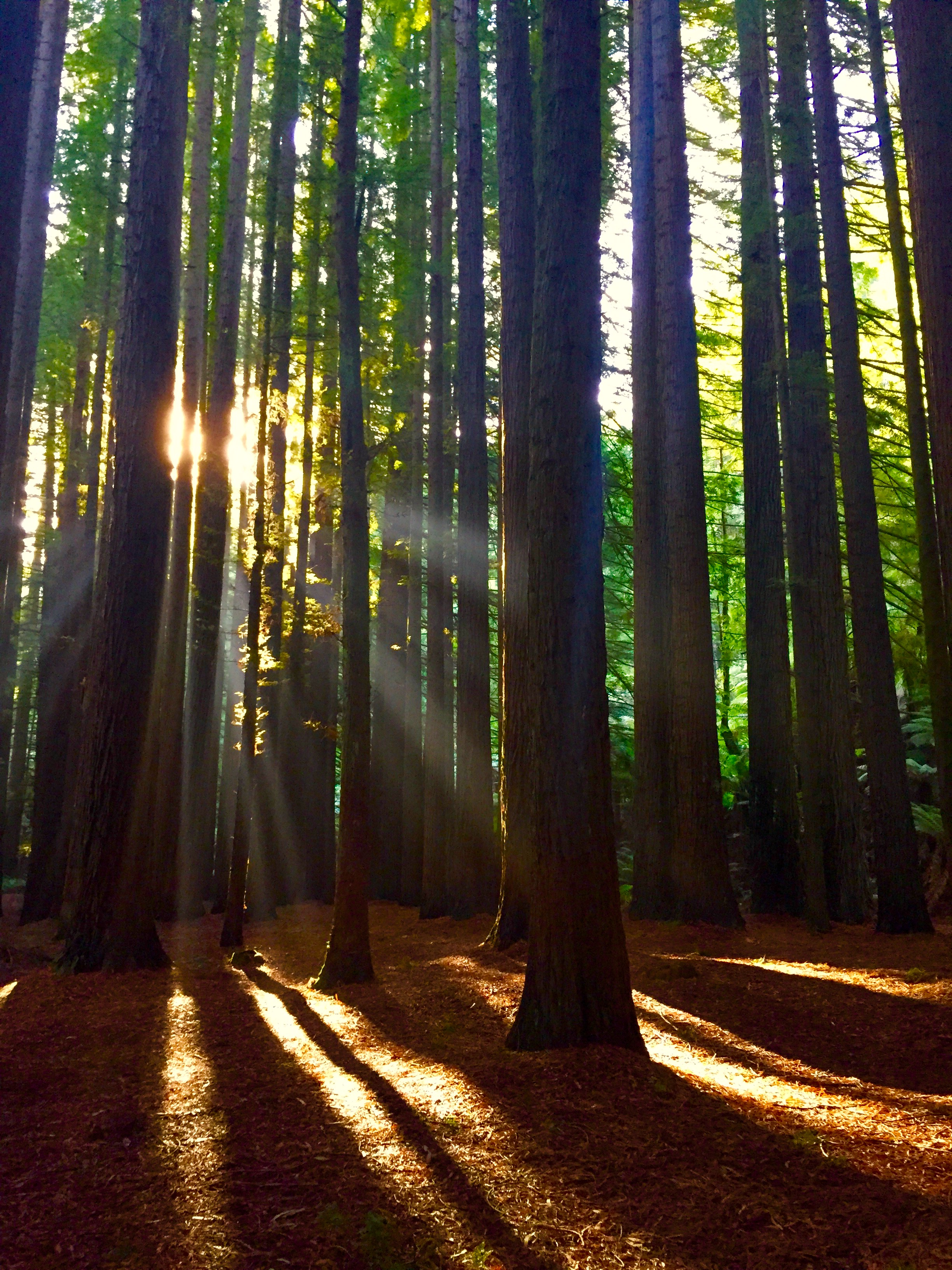
- The redwoods in Great Otway National Park
- Interactive map of Redwoods of the Otway Ranges

Geography
- Location: near Beech Forest, Great Otway National Park, Otway Ranges, Victoria, Australia
- Coordinates: 38°40′6″S 143°34′48″E

Administration
- Established: 1936; 90 years ago

Ecology
- Forest cover: 60 metres (200 ft)
- Dominant tree species: Sequoia sempervirens

The Redwoods of the Otway Ranges is a small sheltered grove of Coast Redwoods, Sequoia sempervirens, about 5 kilometres (3 mi) south of Beech Forest in the Otway Ranges in southwestern Victoria, Australia.

The trees, known by some as Californian Redwoods, were one of many conifer species planted experimentally at different locations in what was to become the fledgling Aire Valley Plantation.

The trees, planted in 1936 by the Forests Commission Victoria, were initially slow to establish but have thrived and grown to a height of over 60 metres (200 ft). Measurements in 2004 showed the trees have the potential to be as tall as their Californian counterparts, if left undisturbed from bushfire, pests and disease, or trampling by tourism.

The site has become a popular tourist destination in the Great Otway National Park and has also been classified as a site of biological and cultural significance.

== Aire Valley settlement ==
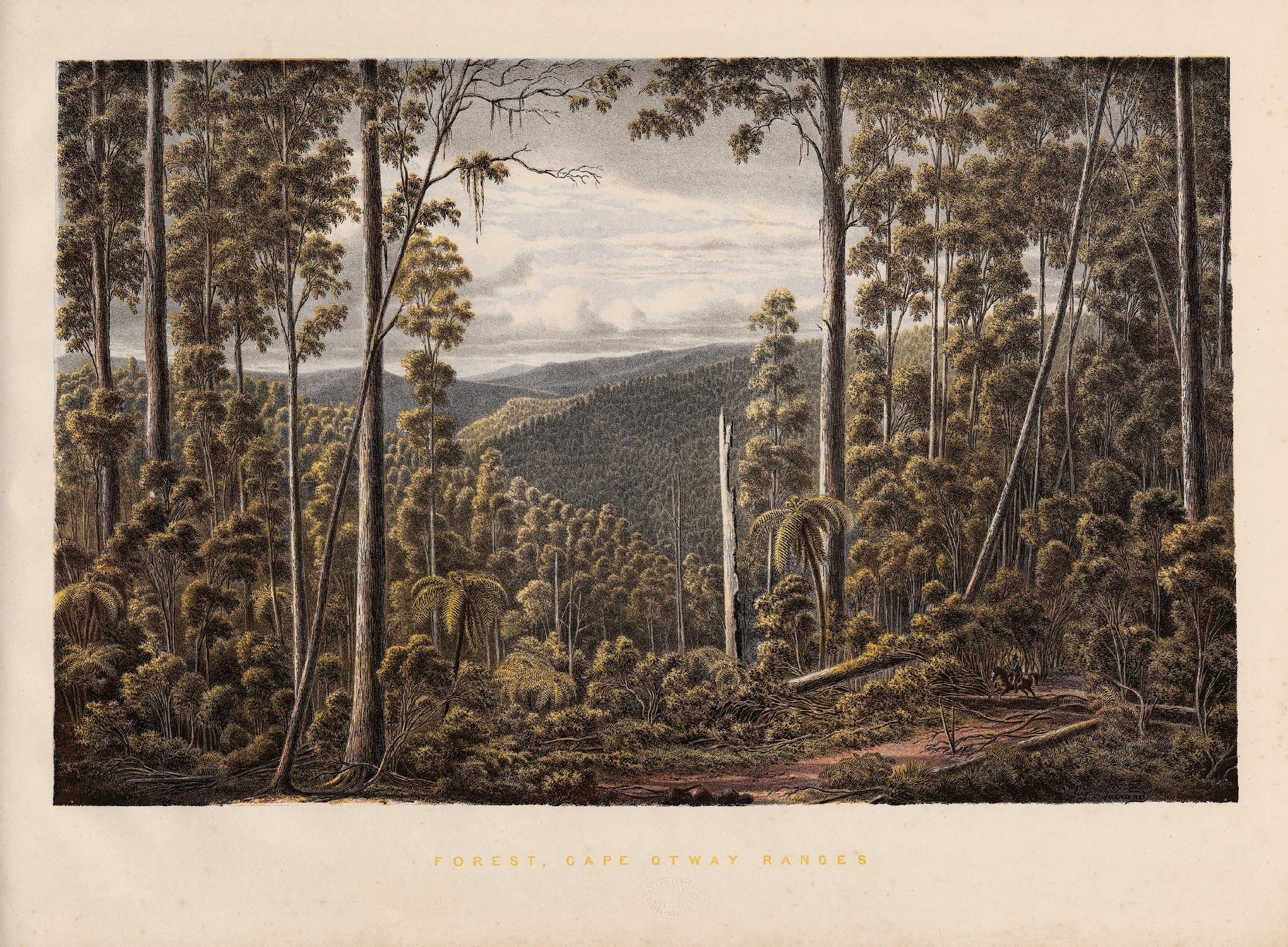
The dense Otway forests confronted early settlers - Eugene von Guérard, 1860s.

Following the occupation of most of the fertile plains and foothills around Melbourne by early European settlers, the forests of the Otways hinterland were progressively cleared and settled for agriculture. Although that began in the 1830s, there was a second wave of settlement into the higher and wetter mountain forests during the 1880s.

Clearing by John Gardiner began around Beech Forest in 1885, followed by settlers moving south into the upper reaches of the Aire Valley. Brothers Edward and Thomas Hall, together with Charles Farrell, took possession of heavily forested blocks in 1887.

This region of the Otways is meteorologically renowned, with an average of 235 wet days per year. Nearby Weeaproinah records an average rainfall of 2010 mm, making it one of the wettest places in Australia. That climate has favoured the growth of the redwoods in a topographically suitable site such as the Aire Valley.

Construction of the Crowes railway line from Colac to Beech Forest commenced in 1900 and it opened on 26 February 1902. The primary traffic was sawn timber and firewood, and many sawmills were located adjacent to the railway.

Farming families toiled to clear the huge trees and sow pasture. However, many had given up by the 1920s and 1930s because of wet weather, weeds, rabbits, scrub regrowth, difficult access to markets, and the impact of the Great Depression. There were also destructive bushfires in 1886, 1919, 1932, and on Black Friday in 1939. It was a similar story in the Strzelecki Ranges in eastern Victoria which became known as the Heartbreak Hills.

Much of the abandoned and degraded farmland was purchased by the Forests Commission Victoria and, from the late 1920s, was planted out with either native species or exotic conifers, creating the Aire Valley Plantation.

== Softwood plantations ==
In 1869, William Ferguson, Victoria's first "Overseer of Forests and Crown Land Bailiff", was appointed. After spending some time at the Royal Botanic Gardens with Baron Ferdinand von Mueller, he established the first State Nursery at Macedon in 1872. In 1887, another early Victorian forester, John La Gerche, established a nursery in Sawpit Gully at the rear of the Victorian School of Forestry at Creswick, and began repairing forests scarred by gold mining.

Both Ferguson and La Gerche experimented with a number of conifer species, to determine their suitability and adaptability. Those pioneering foresters decided that the physical properties of native forest hardwoods were unsuitable for some applications, and that plantation-grown softwoods offered the chance to replace expensive imports of Baltic Pine, Oregon, and other timbers, with domestic supplies. Several exotic softwood species were trialled but Pinus insignis (later known as Pinus radiata) was found to grow well in Victorian conditions and was sufficiently promising for commercial planting to begin from 1880.

Planting was limited in the early years and focused on land rehabilitation. The program accelerated from 1910 but, unfortunately, large parts of the early plantings, established in coastal areas between 1910 and 1930, failed due to the unsuitability of the sites. Activity picked up once again in the 1930s, due to government-funded unemployment schemes during the Great Depression. The World War II years saw activity again fall away sharply. After that, there was a new focus on developing native forests in eastern Victoria, owing to the destruction caused by the 1939 bushfire salvage and to provide timber for post-war housing construction.

The plantation program in the Otways got underway in the 1930s and was boosted in the late 1940s. It became an important part of Victoria's plantation estate, covering some 25,000 hectares. The big step came in 1961, after the chairman of the Forest Commission, Alfred Oscar Lawrence, attended the World Forestry Conference in São Paulo, Brazil. He took a bold decision to commit Victoria to a massive plantation expansion (PX) program, which initiated nearly four decades of rapid plantation establishment. At that stage, softwoods were still being imported in large quantities, but it was also believed that softwoods could not only relieve the pressure on native forests but make Australia self-sufficient in timber resources.

== Aire Valley redwoods ==
In addition to the more dominant radiata pine plantations, a number of small trial plots of different conifer species were tried in the Aire Valley during the 1930s, including Sitka Spruce, Canary Island Pine, Bishop Pine, Corsican Pine, Western Yellow Pine, Douglas Fir and Coast Redwood.

Six trial plots of Coast Redwoods, Sequoia sempervirens, were planted between 1929 and 1936. It was hoped that they would be useful in light construction, durable cladding, and roof shingles. It was known by local foresters that the growth of the species was slow but individual trees could reach prodigious heights, having the reputation, along with native mountain ash, for being amongst the tallest trees in the world.

The 1936 redwood plantings at the head of the Aire River were established on two topographic units – the River Flat Unit and the Ridgetop Unit. The small half-hectare plot on the River Flat Unit was planted with 461 seedlings in 11 rows. Mountain ash and cool temperate rainforest would have previously occupied the site. The location proved to be ideal, with high rainfall, good soil on the river flats, cool climate, and summer fogs — very similar to its native habitat in California.

== Aire Valley camp ==
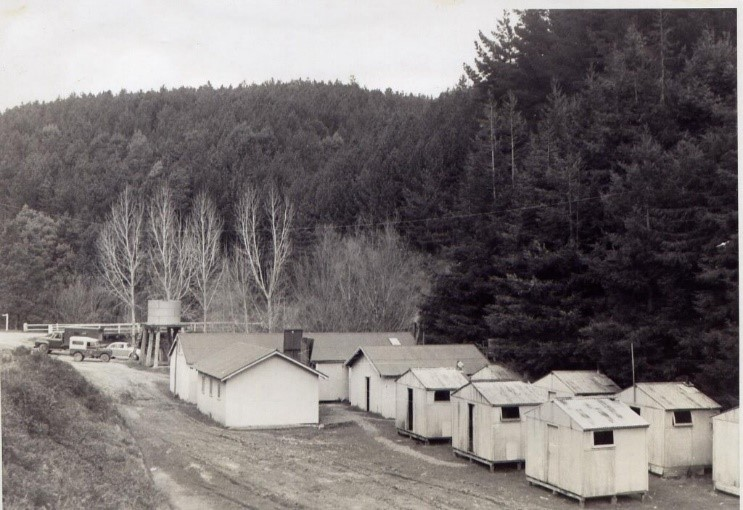
The Forests Commission camp of Stanley Huts was built in 1948 for post-war refugees in the Aire Valley. It was adjacent to the Coast redwood plantation established as a trial in 1936. The trees, which were 23 years old, have branches reaching over the rooftops of the huts. Photo 1959. Source: Roger Smith.

Early in the development of the Aire Valley Plantation, the Forests Commission built camps at a number of sites to accommodate workers. Forest camps were particularly important in an era before the forest road network was well established, and before reliable vehicle transport made daily commuting to a nearby town a possibility.

Unemployment relief camps in the 1930s provided an important pool of labour. By 1935–36, the Forests Commission employed almost 9,000 men in relief works, and a further 1,200 boys under a "Youth for Conservation Plan". One success story was at "Boys Camp" near Noojee. Other camps followed including one in the Aire Valley.

Depending on the nature and use of the forest camp, workers could be accommodated for periods of several days, weeks, or months and, in the case of refugee camps, even years.

The Forests Commission built a new camp next to the Aire Valley Redwoods in March 1948 which consisted of a kitchen cookhouse and mess, shower block, toilets, woodshed, and eighteen small, two-man Stanley Huts.

The bulk of the planting work in the Aire Valley Plantation was done by post-war immigrants, and refugees from Lithuania, Latvia, Estonia, Poland, Czechoslovakia, and Yugoslavia. The first batch of "Balts" as they became known, arrived at Colac in April 1949, and lived in the Aire Valley Camp for up to two years as part of their government-sponsored resettlement program. It was reportedly a bleak existence, particularly in winter, but they made the camp comfortable. Construction of an all-weather road network by the Forests Commission in the 1950s led to the closure of the camp.

== Tall trees ==
The initial growth of the redwoods at the Aire Valley was slow and disappointing, with the notable exception of the trees planted on the River Unit in 1936. After two years of growth, they were about 0.75 metres in height. In 1950, after nearly 14 years of growth, the local forester reported that the trees were only just beginning to appear above the canopy of scrub. Two years later, the maximum tree height was 10.5 metres with a diameter of about 25 to 30 cm.

In 1977, the Forests Commission remeasured the trees (then aged 41 years), finding a height of 40.3 metres and a diameter of 85 cm for the largest tree. When measured in 2004 (aged 68 years) the trees had reached nearly 60 metres in height and 107 cm in diameter, with the largest tree on the plot being 184.9 cm. The initial plot of 461 trees had also thinned down to 220 stems since planting in 1936. Some had died, some had been struck by lightning, some had been removed or cut down, and others had fallen down. The planting rows, where trees were originally spaced 3.3 metres apart, are still visible.

There has always been a recognition of the conservation and aesthetic values of Victoria's large forest trees. As early as 1866, Ferdinand von Mueller, the Government botanist, published some astonishing, and probably exaggerated claims of a mountain ash (Eucalyptus regnans - monarch of the eucalypts) on the Black's Spur near Healesville being 146.3 metres (480 feet) high. There were reports from nurseryman David Boyle and others, of trees in the Yarra Valley, Otways and Dandenong Ranges reaching "half a thousand feet" (>150 m). In 1856, on an overland trip across the Otways Ranges from Forrest to Apollo Bay, Edward Snell, civil engineer and surveyor, made one of the earliest reports of hundreds of trees at least 120 metres (390 feet) tall. The tallest reliably measured tree in Victoria was a mountain ash near Thorpdale which, after it was cut down to make fence palings in 1881, was measured at 114.3 metres (375 feet) by a government surveyor, George Cornthwaite, and his brother Bill, a farmer.

Modern Lidar imagery of the forests is being used to find remaining stands of tall trees. The tallest regrowth mountain ash in Victoria is currently named Artemis which can be found near Beenak at 302 feet (92 m) while the Ada Tree at 72 metres (236 feet) is thought to be between 350 and 450 years old, but with a senescent crown and is a popular tourist destination in State forest east of Powelltown. Australia's tallest measured living specimen of mountain ash, named Centurion, stands at 99.6 metres (327 feet) in Tasmania.

Whether a mountain ash over 400 feet (120 m) high ever existed in Victoria, or in the Otways, is now impossible to substantiate, but the early accounts from the 1860s are still quoted in contemporary texts such as the Guinness Book of Records and Carder, as well as being widely restated on the internet.

Around the turn of the 20th century, Nicholas Caire named and photographed many of Victoria's remaining giant trees. In the forest behind Apollo Bay, along the West Barham River, stands a small patch of about 80 mountain ash trees that are thought to be about 400 years old and have survived bushfires, storms, and landslides.

Currently, the world's tallest living tree is also a Coast Redwood, Sequoia sempervirens, named the Hyperion, that was discovered in California in 2006 in a remote section of the Redwood National Park. The measurement of that tree was undertaken by Professor Stephen Sillett, renowned tall tree and canopy researcher at Humboldt State University, who confirmed its status as the tallest living Redwood at a height of 115.55 metres.

While still only young, the redwoods in the Aire Valley, if given time, protection from bushfires, freedom from disease and pests, and escape from fierce storms, may surpass the heights of Australia's mountain ash and could even top the heights of those in their native environment of coastal California.

== Tourism ==
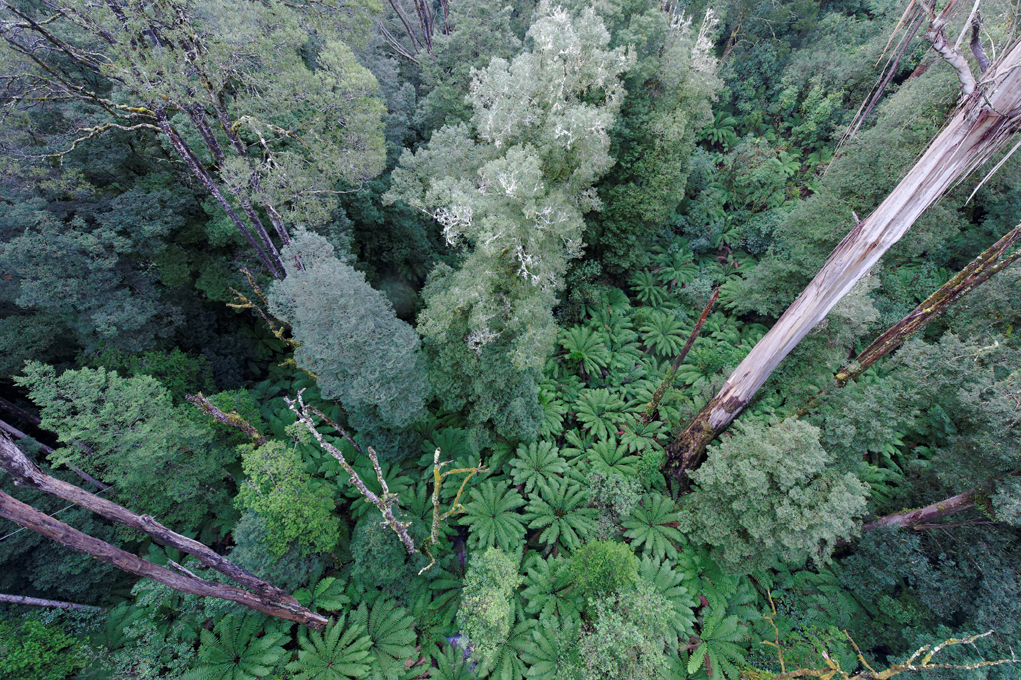
The Otway Treetop Walk is a popular tourist destination near the Aire Valley Redwoods.

The Aire Valley Camp operated until the late 1950s but was demolished sometime during the mid-1960s. The site was then managed for the next 25 years by the Forests Commission Victoria as a small picnic ground with limited facilities. But after several departmental restructures including vesting of the softwood plantation estate with the Victorian Plantations Corporation in 1993, the site became neglected, the facilities vandalised and the ground scarred with vehicle tracks and littered with rubbish.

The small grove of Coast Redwoods in the Aire Valley has been now been incorporated into the Great Otway National Park and has been classified as a site of Biological and Cultural Significance.

Apart from their beauty and botanical significance, the redwoods are a lasting memorial to the many foresters and forest workers who battled the weather, remoteness, and scrub to reclaim the land abandoned by earlier farming and return it to productive use. But two individuals stand out, Frank Smith, the District Forester and Officer in Charge of the Aire Valley Plantations from 1929 to 1955, together with Forest Overseer Stewart Cameron, who worked from 1940 to the early 1970s. The largest redwood on the plot is known as the Smith-Cameron Tree and is named after those two pioneering Forests Commission employees.

The Aire Valley Redwoods have also become a local tourist attraction, together with nearby sites like the Otway Fly and Treetop Walk, the Beauchamp Falls, the Hopetoun Falls, the Triplet Falls, and magnificent stands of mountain ash and rainforest. As the trees grow and become more impressive they will attract increasing interest from local, national, and international tourists, which presents a significant threat.

In 1930, a small stand of redwoods was also planted by the Melbourne & Metropolitan Board of Works, as part of a revegetation program in the Cement Creek catchment, near Warburton. The plantation provided small study plots to examine canopy interception of rainfall and for comparison with native forest in the Coranderrk area. The Cement Creek stand has also become a very popular tourist destination and is heritage listed. There are over 1476 trees on an even 3.3 m grid spacing, ranging in height from 20 metres to 55 metres. The stand has not self-thinned like the one in the Otways and is not as tall. It is believed that the seed came from England and the seedlings were raised at the Forests Commission nursery at Creswick.

== See also ==
- Beauchamp Falls
- Eberwaldt Falls
- Hopetoun Falls
- Little Aire Falls
- Stevensons Falls
- Triplet Falls
