= Eberwaldt Falls =

Waterfall in Victoria, Australia

- Location within Victoria
- Location: Beech Forest, Victoria, Australia
- Coordinates: 38°38′24″S 143°36′27″E
- Type: Plunge
- Total height: 15.74 m (51.6 ft)
- Number of drops: 1
- Watercourse: Deppeler Creek

Eberwaldt Falls is a waterfall on Deppeler Creek in the Otway Ranges, within the locality of Beech Forest, Victoria, Australia. The waterfall consists of a single drop measuring approximately 15.74 metres.

== History ==
The origin of the name Eberwaldt Falls comes from a corruption of Eberswalde, a town in Brandenburg, Germany, located approximately 50 kilometres north-east of Berlin.

The waterfall is located on Deppeler Creek, which takes its name from Jacob Johann Deppeler, an early European settler in Victoria. Deppeler was born in Tegerfelden, Switzerland, in 1837 and emigrated to Australia in 1855. He later established a vineyard at Gheringhap, and with his wife, Caroline Knecht, raised a family of 10 children.

Two of Deppeler's eldest sons, John (born 1862) and Jacob (born 1864), became early settlers in the Beech Forest area. Jacob Deppeler selected land in the area around 1892, and it was through this Swiss-German connection that the name Eberwaldt had become associated with the local landscape.

== See also ==
- Little Aire Falls
- Hopetoun Falls
- Beauchamp Falls
- Triplet Falls
- Simmons Falls
- Stevensons Falls
