= Gellibrand (surname) =

Gellibrand is a surname. For its etymology, see Gillibrand, of which Gellibrand is a variant. Around 2016, thirteen people in Great Britain bore the name, and none in Ireland. At the 1881 census of Great Britain, twelve people bore the name, located predominantly in London.

Notable people with the surname include:

- Edith Morgan Gellibrand (1864–1894), known also as Edith Chester, British actress
- Henry Gellibrand (1597–1637), English mathematician
- Samuel Gellibrand (1614–1675), English bookseller
- John Gellibrand (1872–1945), Australian military officer and politician
- Joseph Gellibrand (1792–1837), Australian jurist, son of William Gellibrand the settler
- Paula Gellibrand (1898–1986), English female model and writer
- Samuel Gellibrand (1614–1675), London bookseller, brother of Henry
- Walter Gellibrand (1832–1909), Australian politician
- William Gellibrand (settler) (1765–1840), English minister, later in Van Diemen's Land
- William Clarke Gellibrand (1791–1884), English merchant, son of the settler
- William Gellibrand (politician) (1823–1905), Australian politician, son of William Gellibrand
