= Slender Falls =

Waterfall in Victoria, Australia

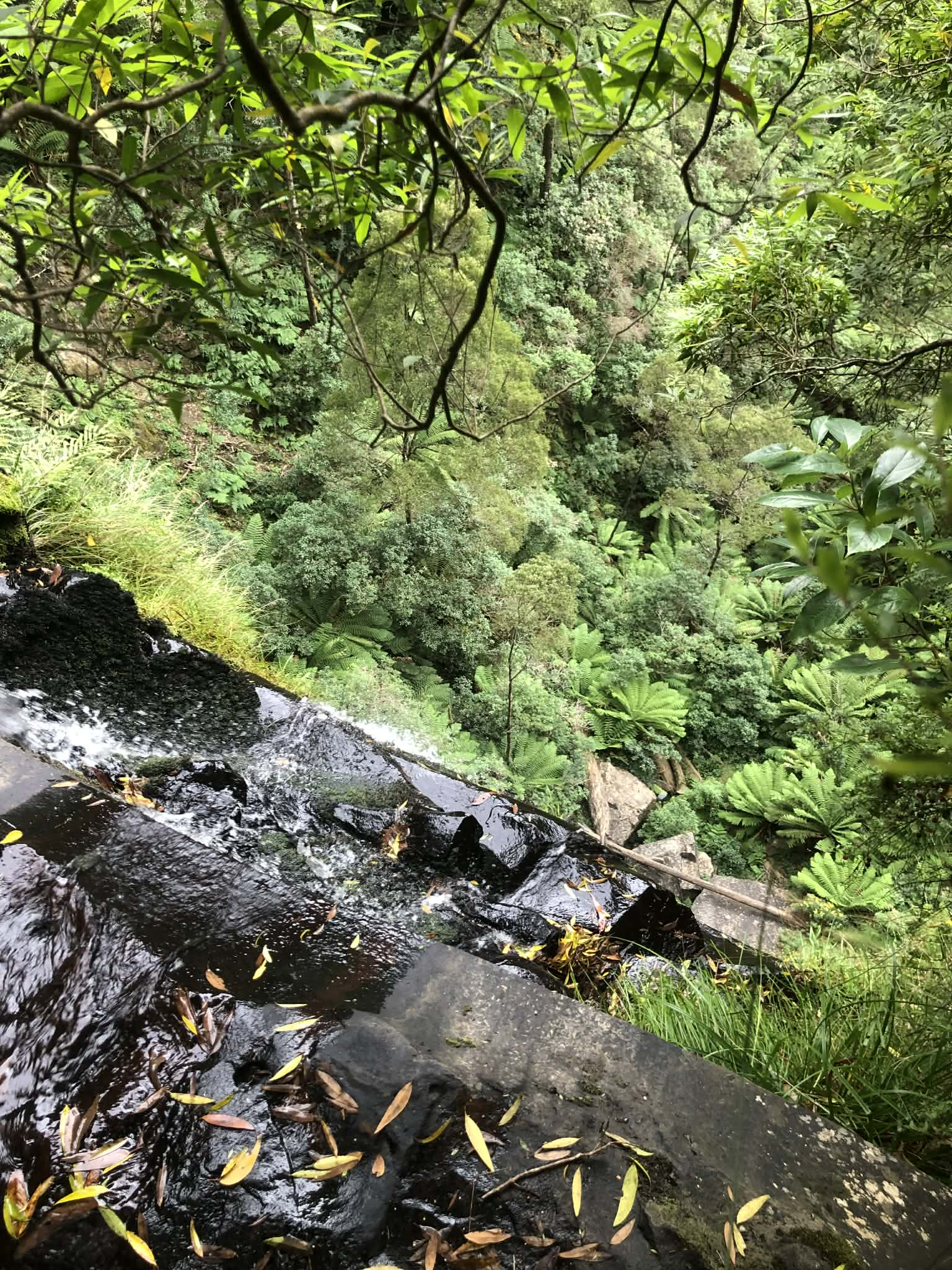
- View from the top of Slender Falls, February 19 2026

- Location within Victoria
- Location: Tanybryn, Victoria, Australia
- Coordinates: 38°40′45″S 143°44′42″E
- Type: Plunge
- Total height: 66.17 m (217.1 ft)
- Number of drops: 3
- Watercourse: Tributary of Smythe Creek

Slender Falls is a waterfall located within the Otway Ranges, in the locality of Tanybryn, Victoria, Australia. The waterfall, at a total height of 66.17 metres (217.1 feet), is composed of three drops, with the largest drop reaching 43.70 metres. It is the third tallest waterfall in the Otway Ranges.

== History and features ==
The waterfall is named after the unique shape of the water falling from the clifftop to the base. The waterfall was discovered by George James Kennedy (1887-1958), who lived at "Sunnyside", near Cape Patten. It was first photographed on Saturday 27th March 1909 by Messrs McMahon, who were the first tourists to visit the falls.

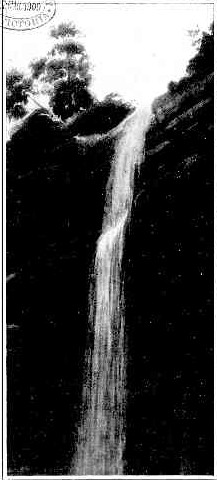
The first photograph of Slender Falls, 1909

The waterfall is extremely difficult to access, and requires experience traversing thick bushland and steep terrain.

== See also ==
- Erskine Falls
- Great Ocean Road
- Hopetoun Falls
- List of waterfalls
- List of waterfalls in Australia
- Sabine Falls
- Simmons Falls
- Triplet Falls
