= Beauchamp Falls =

Waterfall in Victoria, Australia

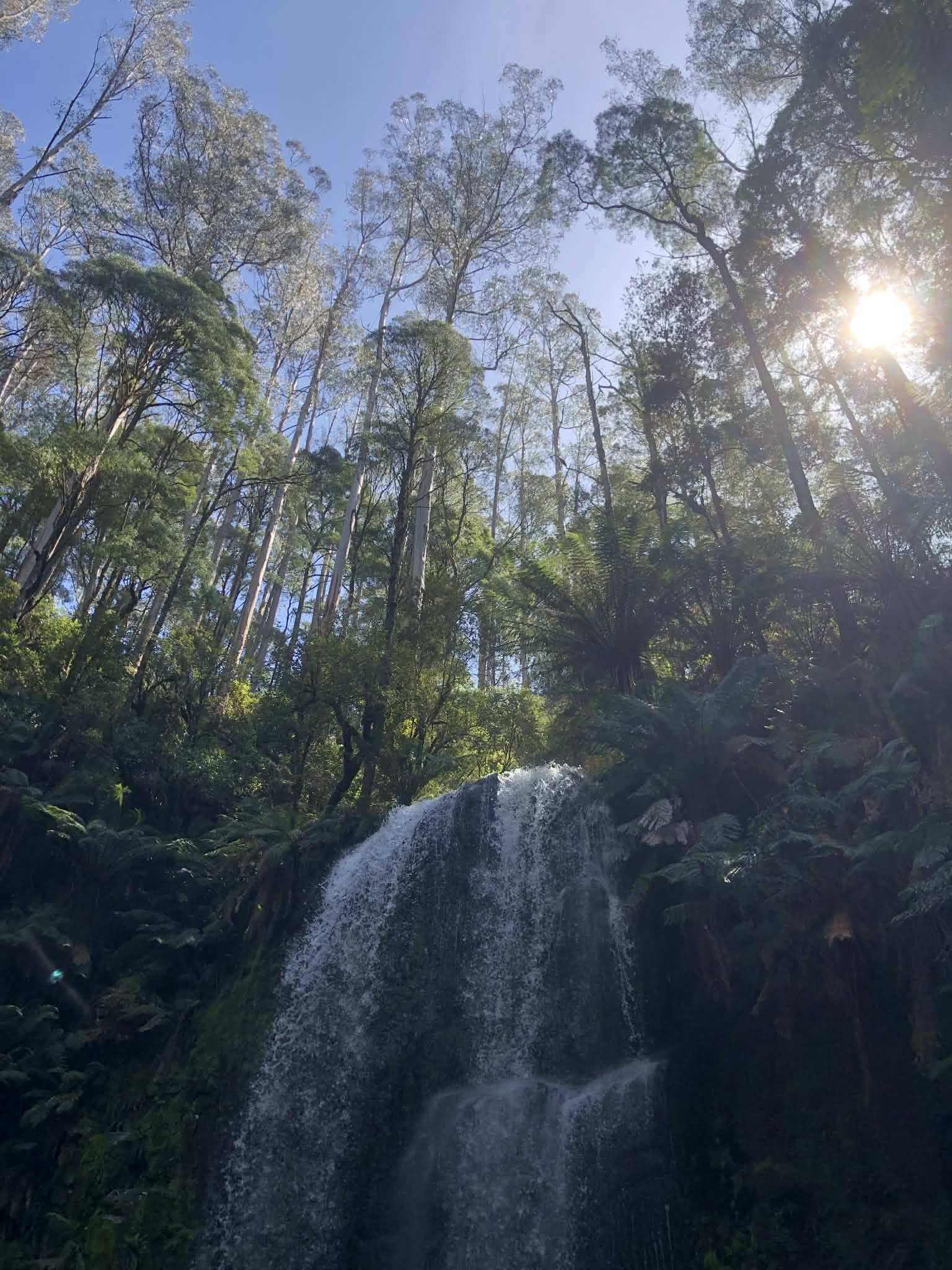
- Beauchamp Falls, 2024

- Location within Victoria
- Location: Beech Forest, Victoria, Australia
- Coordinates: 38°38′57″S 143°36′42″E
- Type: Plunge
- Total height: 18.71 m (61.4 ft)
- Number of drops: 1
- Watercourse: Deppeler Creek

Beauchamp Falls is a waterfall located in the Otway Ranges, within the locality of Beech Forest, Victoria, Australia. The waterfall consists of a singular drop, and is at a total height of 18.71 metres (61.4 feet).

== Description and access ==
The waterfall is most likely named after New Zealand-born George Fox Beauchamp-Proctor (1859–1955), who was the engineer in charge of the construction of the Beech Forest Railway.

Access to the waterfall from Beech Forest is via Binns Road, then to Flannigan Road, and then Beauchamp Falls Road, which then reaches a picnic and camping area. From this area, a walking path, with views of mountain ash and ferns, reaches the waterfall, which is 3 km in return.

== See also ==
- Great Ocean Road
- Eberwaldt Falls
- Hopetoun Falls
- List of waterfalls
- List of waterfalls in Australia
- Little Aire Falls
- Triplet Falls
- Twelve Apostles
