= Sabine Falls =

Waterfall in Victoria, Australia

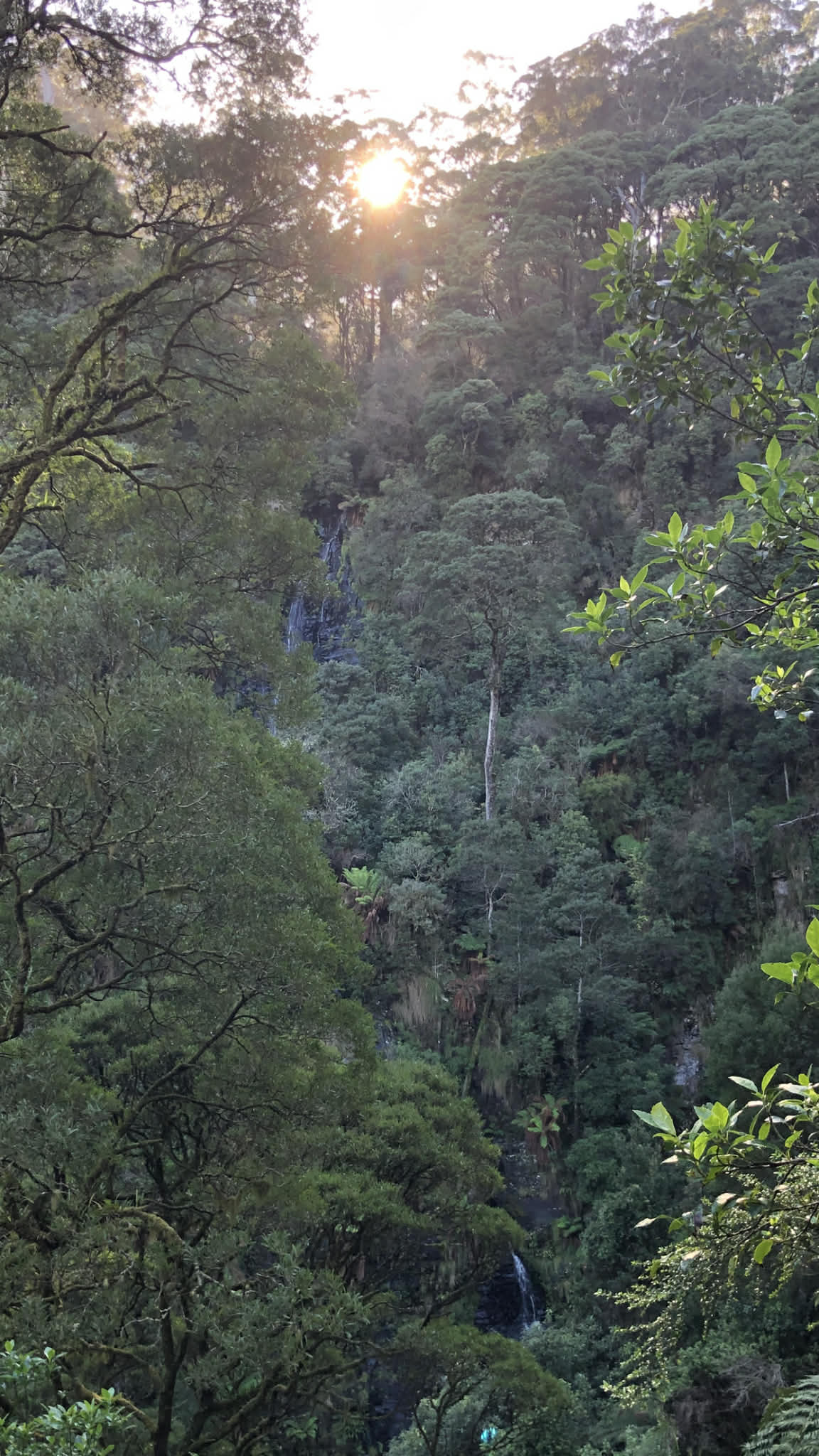
- Sabine Falls, 2025

- Location within Victoria
- Location: Mount Sabine, Victoria, Australia
- Coordinates: 38°38′11″S 143°44′21″E
- Type: Plunge
- Total height: ~130 m (430 ft)
- Number of drops: 1
- Watercourse: Smythe Creek

Sabine Falls is a waterfall located in the Otway Ranges, located in the locality of Mount Sabine, 14.5km north-east of Apollo Bay, Victoria, Australia. The waterfall, with a total height of approximately 130 metres (335 feet) dropping over three tiers, is the tallest waterfall in the Otway Ranges.

== History ==
Both Mount Sabine and Sabine Falls are most likely named after Major-General Sabine, who was the President of the Royal Society of London while Alfred Richard Cecil Selwyn, an early surveyor of the Otways, was the Victorian Director of the Geological Survey of Victoria, with Mount Sabine appearing on maps as early as 1865.

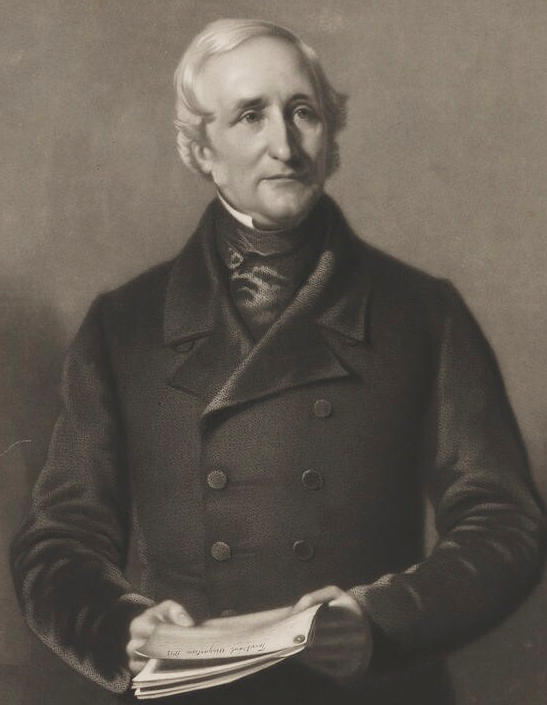
Major-General Sabine, the waterfall's namesake

Mr James Sinclair was likely the first person to discover the waterfall in the 1870s, upon carrying out inspections for various works in the area during his tenure as the Shire Engineer for Colac from 1874 to 1882.

An official walking track was constructed down to the waterfall in the 1990s, but by 2001 the waterfall came under threat from nearby logging, with the government considering expansion into the immediate vicinity of the waterfall, but these plans never eventuated.

== Access ==
A small car park beside Sunnyside Road, 4km from the Forrest-Apollo Bay Road and Sunnyside Road junction, contains several picnic tables and a picnic area, with a steep walking track leading down to a lookout in front of the waterfall.

== See also ==
- Erskine Falls
- Great Ocean Road
- Hopetoun Falls
- List of waterfalls
- List of waterfalls in Australia
- Simmons Falls
- Slender Falls
- Triplet Falls
