= William Gellibrand =

William Gellibrand may refer to

- William Gellibrand (settler) (1765–1840), English nonconformist minister in Van Diemen's Land
- William Gellibrand (politician) (1823–1905), Member of the Tasmanian House of Assembly, grandson of the settler
- William Clarke Gellibrand (1791–1884), English merchant, son of the settler
