= Simmons Falls =

Waterfall in Victoria, Australia

- Simmons Falls, 1913 (from The Australasian)

- Location within Victoria
- Location: Barramunga, Victoria, Australia
- Coordinates: 38°35′06″S 143°41′37″E
- Type: Plunge
- Total height: 14.79 m (48.5 ft)
- Number of drops: 1
- Watercourse: Barramunga Creek

Simmons Falls is a waterfall on Barramunga Creek in the Otway Ranges near Barramunga, Victoria, Australia. The waterfall consists of a single drop with a total height of approximately 14.79 metres.

== History ==
Simmons Falls is named after the Simmons family, early European settlers who took up land in the Barramunga district during the 1890s. The family included brothers George, Charles Henry, and John Simmons, whose father, Charles Carter Simmons, was born in Norfolk, England, in 1838. He emigrated to Victoria with his family around 1847 when he was about 9 years old.

The waterfall itself was situated on land owned by Charles Henry Simmons (1865-1923), after whom it is most likely named. Born at Barrabool Hills on 20 February 1865, Charles Henry married Sarah Stewart, and together they raised a family of 16 children. In 1904, the family left Barramunga and settled in Warragul. He died on 2 July 1923.

George Simmons remained in the district longer than his brothers and was the proprietor of the Junction Hotel at Barramunga. He lived there with his wife and family for many years before moving elsewhere in Victoria. George Simmons died at East Brunswick on 7 May 1931.

A photograph of the falls was published in The Australasian on 10 May 1913, indicating that the waterfall had become a recognised scenic attraction by the early twentieth century.

== See also ==
- Stevensons Falls
- Erskine Falls
- Sabine Falls
- Slender Falls
