= Gillibrand (surname) =

Gillibrand (/ˈdʒɪliˌbrænd, -lɪ-/) is a surname. In 2016, around 676 people bore the name in Great Britain. At the time of Great Britain's 1881 census, 608 people bore the name, predominantly in Lancashire. A variant spelling is Gellibrand.

== Etymology ==
The name comes into English from Anglo-Norman. It was borrowed into Anglo-Norman from the medieval Continental West Germanic name Giselbrand, whose first element, gisel, meant 'hostage' and whose second element, brand, meant 'firebrand', 'sword'.

== Notable people ==
People with the surname include:

- Ernest Gillibrand (1901–1976), English football forward
- Ian Gillibrand (1948–1989), English football defender
- Kirsten Gillibrand (born 1966), U.S. senator
- Nicky Gillibrand, theatrical costume designer

== See also ==
- Gellibrand (disambiguation)
