= Gellibrand =

Gellibrand may refer to:

== Places ==
- Division of Gellibrand, an Australian federal electoral division in Victoria
- Gellibrand, Victoria, town in Australia

== Other uses ==
- Gellibrand (surname)
- Gellibrand River
