= Carlisle River =

Perennial river in Victoria, Australia

Carlisle
- Location of the Carlisle River mouth in Victoria

Location
- Country: Australia
- State: Victoria
- Region: South East Coastal Plain (IBRA), The Otways
- Local government area: Colac Otway Shire

Physical characteristics
- Source: Otway Ranges
  - location: south of Carlisle River (town)
  - coordinates: 38°36′38″S 143°25′19″E
  - elevation: 90 m (300 ft)
- Mouth: confluence with the Gellibrand River
  - location: west of Carlisle River (town)
  - coordinates: 38°33′11″S 143°22′22″E
  - elevation: 29 m (95 ft)
- Length: 9 km (5.6 mi)

Basin features
- River system: Corangamite catchment
- Tributaries
  - left: Arkins Creek, Cole Creek

The Carlisle River is a perennial river of the Corangamite catchment, in the Otways region of the Australian state of Victoria.

== Location and features ==
The Carlisle River rises in the Otway Ranges in southwest Victoria, south of the settlement of Carlisle River and flows generally north and then west, joined by two minor tributaries, before reaching its confluence with the Gellibrand River, west of the settlement of Carlisle River. From its highest point, the Carlisle River descends 61 metres (200 ft) over its 9-kilometre (5.6 mi) course.

== See also ==
- List of rivers of Australia § Victoria
