= Maits Rest =

Circuit walk in the Otway Ranges, Victoria, Australia

Coordinates: 38°45′21″S 143°33′14″E

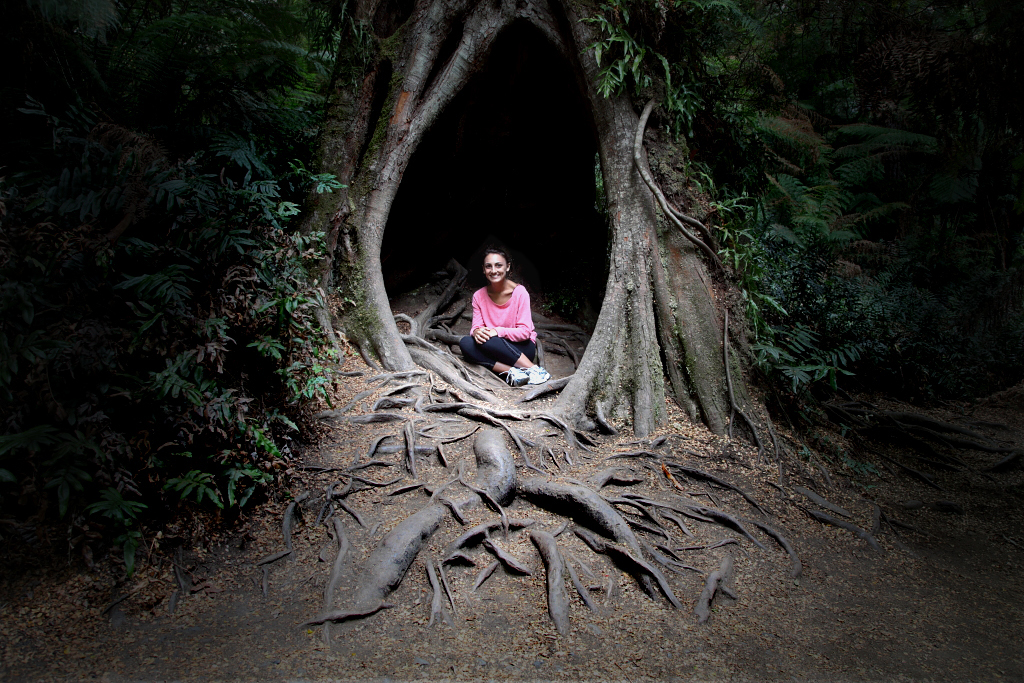
Maits Rest walking trail winds through a rainforest in the Otway Ranges near Apollo Bay in Victoria. It is part of the Great Otway National Park.

Maits Rest is an 800-metre self-guided circuit walk through cool temperate rainforest in the Otway Ranges near Apollo Bay in Victoria (Australia). It is part of the Great Otway National Park.
