= Mathematicall Magick =

1648 treatise by John Wilkins

Mathematicall Magick. Or, The Wonders that may be Performed by Mechanicall Geometry
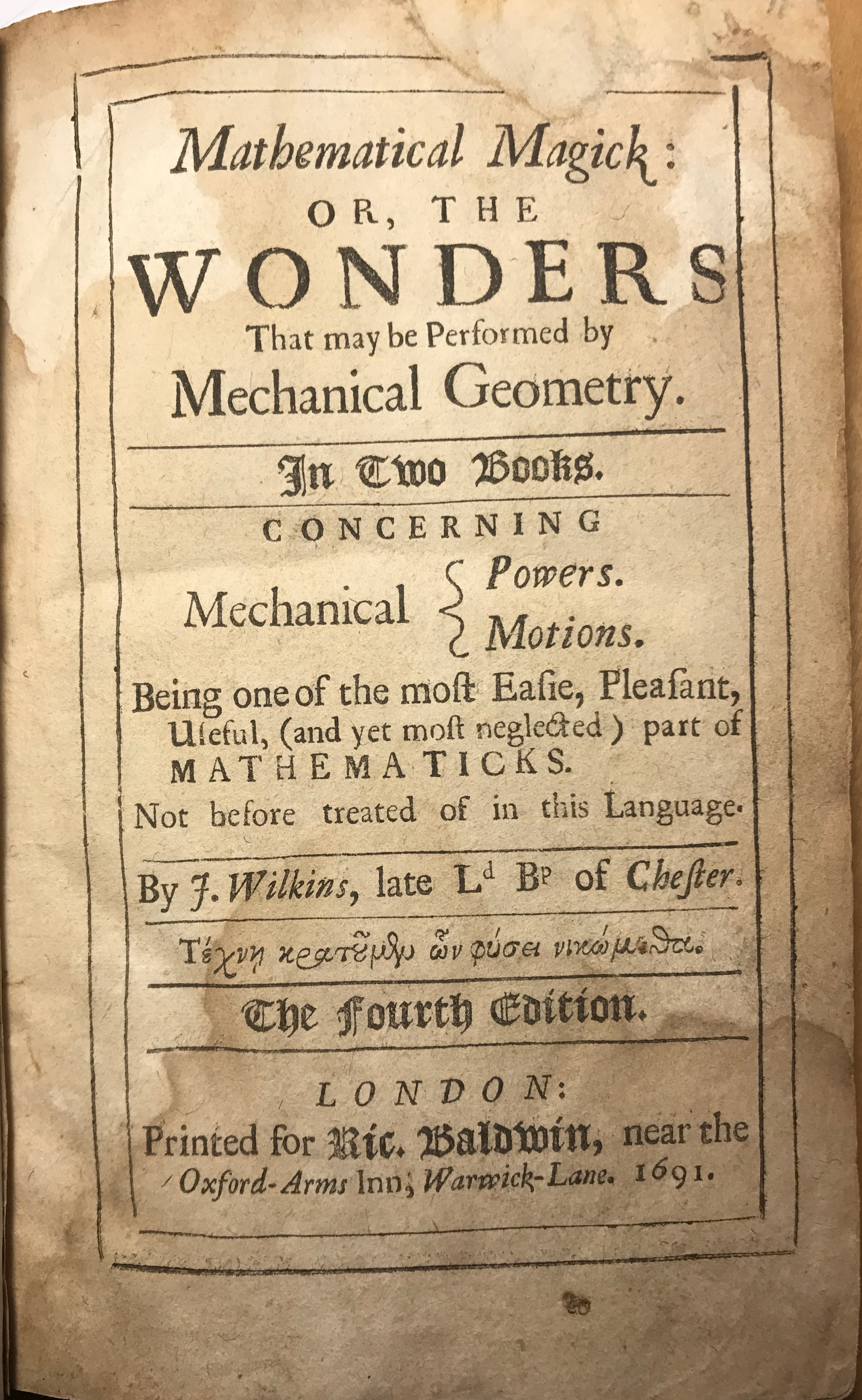
- Title page of the 4th edition (1691)
- Author: John Wilkins
- Language: English
- Subject: Mathematics, science
- Publisher: Printed by M[iles] F[lesher] for Sa[muel] Gellibrand at the Brasen Serpent in Pauls Church-yard
- Publication date: 1648
- Publication place: London
- Media type: Hardcover
- Pages: 295
- OCLC: 41094524

Mathematicall Magick. Or, The Wonders that may be Performed by Mechanicall Geometry is a treatise by the English clergyman, natural philosopher, polymath and author John Wilkins (1614–1672). It was first published in 1648 in London; another edition was printed in 1680 and further editions were published in 1691 and 1707. The work is dedicated to Charles I Louis, the Elector Palatine.

The first book describes traditional mechanical devices, speed, siege engines and the modern guns of Wilkins' era. The second book covers Wilkins' theories and observations on land yachts, submarines, flying machines, and perpetual motion. Wilkins thought that human aviation is feasible, if only sufficient exercise, research and development is directed towards it. He envisioned flying machines that would be large enough to carry several people.

The book repeats tales about early attempts at human flight, including Busbequius' 16th-century reports about Turkish flight experiments in Constantinople. Wilkins also mentions Anglo-Saxon flight experiments during the reign of Edward the Confessor. The researcher called "Elmerus" in the text is probably Eilmer of Malmesbury, who experimented with gliding flight in the 11th century.

== Abstract ==
Wilkins dedicated his work to His Highness the Prince Elector Palatine (Charles I Louis) who was in London at the time. It is divided into two books, one headed Archimedes, because he was the chiefest in discovering of Mechanical powers, the other was called Daedalus because he was one of the first and most famous amongst the Ancients for his skill in making Automata. Wilkins sets out and explains the principles of mechanics in the first book and gives an outlook in the second book on future technical developments like flying which he anticipates as certain if only sufficient exercise, research and development would be directed to these topics. The treatise is an example of his general intention to disseminate scientific knowledge and method and of his attempts to persuade his readers to pursue further scientific studies.

== First book ==
In the 20 chapters of the first book, traditional mechanical devices are discussed such as the balance, the lever, the wheel or pulley and the block and tackle, the wedge, and the screw. The powers acting on them are compared to those acting in the human body. The book deals with the phrase attributed to Archimedes saying that if he did but know where to stand and fasten his instrument, he could move the world and shows the effect of a series of gear transmissions one linked to the other. It shows the importance of various speeds and the theoretical possibility to increase speed beyond the speed of the Earth at the equator. Finally, siege engines like catapults are compared with the cost and effect of then-modern guns.

== Second book ==
=== Various devices ===
In the 15 chapters of the second book, various devices are examined which move independently of human interference like clocks and watches, water mills and wind mills. Wilkins explains devices being driven by the motion of air in a chimney or by pressurized air. A land yacht is proposed driven by two sails on two masts, and a wagon powered by a vertical axis wind turbine. A number of independently moving small artificial figures representing men and animals are described. The possibilities are considered to improve the type of submarine designed and built by Cornelis Drebbel. The tales about various flying devices are related and doubts as to their truth are dissipated. Wilkins explains that it should be possible for a man, too, to fly by himself if a frame were built where the person could sit and if this frame was sufficiently pushed in the air.

=== Art of flying ===
In chapter VII, Wilkins discusses various methods how a man could fly, namely by the help of spirits and good or evil angels (as related on various occasions in the Bible), by the help of fowls, by wings fastened immediately to the body or by a flying chariot. The whole of this chapter (and of the following one) concern the possibilities of flying. In a single preliminary phrase, he refers to previous reports of flight attempts:

Tis related of a certain English Monk called Elmerus [probably Eilmer of Malmesbury], about the Confessors time, that he did by such wings fly from a Tower above a furlong; and so another [probably Fausto Veranzio] from Saint Marks steeple in Venice; another at Norinberge; and Busbequius speaks of a Turk in Constantinople, who attempted something this way. Mt. Burton mentioning this quotation, doth believe that some new-fangled wit ('tis his Cynical phrase) will some time or other find out this art. Though the truth is, most of these Artists did unfortunately miscarry by falling down and breaking their arms or legs, yet that may be imputed to their want of experience ...

— p. 204

He writes that sufficient practise should enable a man to fly, most probably by "a flying chariot, which may be so contrived as to carry a man within it" and equipped with a sort of engine, or else big enough to carry several people, each successively working to fly it. He used the next chapter to dissipate any doubts there may be as to the possibility of such a flying chariot, should a number of particular items be developed and tested.

=== Perpetual motion and perpetual lamps ===
In Chapters IX to XV, extensive discussions and deliberations are set out why a perpetual motion should be feasible, why the stories about lamps burning for hundreds of years were true and how such lamps could be made and perpetual motions created.
