= Samuel Gellibrand =

English bookseller

Samuel Gellibrand (1614–1675) was a London bookseller and son of physician Henry Gellibrand (1568–1615) and Mary Faversham, along with brothers John, Edward, Thomas and Henry, a mathematician appointed Gresham Professor of Astronomy. Samuel apprenticed under Henry Featherstone from 1630 to 1637, set up shop at the sign of the Brazen Serpent in St. Paul's Churchyard and published Mathematical Magick in 1648.
