= Joseph Gellibrand =

Australian politician

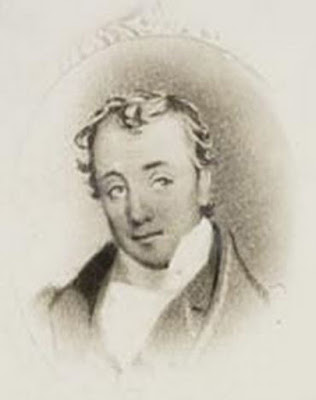
- Born: Joseph Tice Gellibrand; 1792; England
- Died: 1837 (aged 44–45); Port Phillip, Australia
- Occupation: First attorney-general of Van Diemen's Land
- Known for: Disappearance and death

Joseph Tice Gellibrand (1792 – 1837) was the first Attorney-General of the British colony of Van Diemen's Land (now the Australian island state of Tasmania), where he gained notoriety with his attempts to establish full rights of trial by jury. He became an integral part of the Port Phillip Association, producing the Batman Treaty in an attempt to obtain extensive landholdings from the local Aboriginal people around Port Phillip. Gellibrand was also later part of an ill-fated expedition into the region west of Geelong, where he disappeared and was assumed to have been killed by Aboriginal people in the Otway Range.

== Early life ==
Joseph Tice Gellibrand was born in England, the second son of William Gellibrand and Sophia Louisa (née Hynde).

== Attorney-General of Van Diemen's Land ==
At the beginning of 1825 Robert William Lathrop Murray, editor of the Hobart Town Gazette, began criticising the colonial government in his paper.

In 1830 he acted for Roderic O'Connor in a case brought by Sheriff Dudley Fereday, who was also a moneylender. Fereday accused O'Connor of libel after O'Connor had publicly attacked his business practices. Gellibrand gave "a detailed account of Fereday as the prince of usurers, lending money at 35 per cent interest". Fereday won damages of £400, but his reputation was severely damaged by Gellibrand's speeches.

== Port Phillip Association ==
In 1835 Gellibrand became one of the leading members of the Port Phillip Association, a company of seventeen colonists who devised a plan to obtain and divide amongst themselves thousands of acres of land on the northern shore of Port Phillip through a treaty with the local Wurundjeri people. Gellibrand, having a strong foundation in law, drew up this Batman Treaty which stipulated that the Aboriginal people would hand over all of the land within ten miles of the northern shore in exchange for a yearly hand-out of basic provisions. Gellibrand was assigned a block of land that is now the region that extends from Laverton to Spotswood.

Gellibrand with several other members of the Association crossed Bass Strait from Van Diemen's Land in January 1836 in a vessel loaded with sheep to be pastured on their newly obtained land. They came ashore at Western Port, and following native pathways that took them through vacant Aboriginal villages, they made their way across the Mornington Peninsula to Port Phillip. Supplying themselves with water from wells dug by Aboriginal people, they walked along the shore to the vicinity of Melbourne. Gellibrand could barely walk by this stage and was taken the remaining distance in boat manned by Aborigines from Sydney, who were working for Batman.

On 4 February, Gellibrand travelled to the Geelong region, guided by William Buckley, an ex-convict who had lived with the local Wathaurong people for over thirty years. He assessed the land there, finding that the Aboriginal people were being driven away by a property manager who threatened to shoot them for stealing potatoes. He then proceeded back to the Yarra River and conducted an exploration up this river to the north-east, where he named the Plenty River. When he returned to Melbourne he conducted an informal inquiry into the abduction and rape of an Aboriginal woman by a shepherd, which resulted in some protection being given to the victim.

Despite Gellibrand's efforts, the Batman Treaty was deemed invalid and overruled by Governor Richard Bourke in 1836. The lands purchased by the Association were judged to be owned by the Crown and not by the members of the Association nor by the Aborigines. The Association members, however, were recompensed £7,000 from the colonial government. Gellibrand subsequently returned to Van Diemen's Land.

== Exploration and disappearance to the west of Port Phillip ==
Gellibrand, in company with George B. L. Hesse, again crossed to Port Phillip and landed near Geelong on 21 February 1837. The two men decided to explore the un-colonised land to the west and planned to follow the Barwon River to its junction with the Leigh River, and afterwards make their way back to Melbourne across country mostly unknown to the British. They set out with a guide but missed the junction with the Leigh River and continued up the Barwon. Their guide became fearful of continuing and returned, while Gellibrand and Hesse decided to travel further west alone.

When Gellibrand and Hesse failed to arrive at Melbourne, a search party consisting of five prominent Geelong pastoralists, including Frederick Armytage and Thomas Roadknight, was immediately organised. This group followed their tracks but lost all sign of them in a forest that existed between what is now Winchelsea and Birregurra. The search party then turned north and became the first Britishers to view Lake Colac before returning to Geelong. Another search party, led by Gellibrand's son, set out on 31 March but again lost sight of Gellibrand and Hesse's tracks within the same forest as the previous group.

In April, a larger group of fourteen men, funded by Gellibrand's wife, was organised after information was obtained from local Aborigines that the two missing men had been killed by Gulidjan people near Lake Colac. Several Wathaurong men of the Barrabool clan around Geelong led the group to Lake Colac, where they found horse-tracks leading to a community beside the lake. The Barrabool men then captured and forced a Gulidjan man by the name of Tanapia into a confession before killing him along with a woman they had also caught. Deeming that the situation had become dangerous for their safety, the search party decided to return to Geelong.

The search party's report that they had solved the mystery and exacted justice was strongly discredited, as no bodies nor any personal artefacts of Gellibrand or Hesse were recovered. It was argued that the Barrabool men had only led the search party to Lake Colac so as to take violence upon a tribe they had animosity with and to obtain the reward offered.

Over a year later, with the disappearance unresolved, another two expeditions were organised. In June 1838, surveyor H.W.H. Smythe was guided by an Aboriginal man named Jack through the Colac region. After reaching Djerrinallum, Jack admitted he had no knowledge of the country further to the west and Smythe resolved to shoot Jack if he showed signs of abandoning him. Symthe returned unsuccessful in obtaining any information about Gellibrand. In July, Alexander McGeary led another search party after information was given that two white men were living with an Aboriginal clan towards the western regions. McGeary also failed to find any sign of Gellibrand but managed to come into conflict with an Aboriginal stranger during his journey, who clubbed McGeary on the head and jaw. His life was saved after two Aboriginal men he employed as guards shot the stranger dead.

== Discovery of remains near Cape Otway ==
In 1844, George Allan, a pioneer pastoralist of the Warrnambool region, learnt that Gadubanud people from the Otway Range had seven years previously encountered two white men fitting the description of Gellibrand and Hesse. They claimed that Gellibrand walked into their camp seeking assistance and although they were able to help Gellibrand, Hesse had already died of starvation. Gellibrand apparently lived with them for two months before he was strangled to death by members of a nearby clan, his body buried and mourned over by the people who had tried to help him.

Allan, with his brother and several Aboriginal guides, set out to find the buried remains. They encountered the Gadubanud clan, who directed them to the burial site near a river they called Barratt. Allan unearthed the skeleton, taking the skull which was later examined and considered with little doubt to be that of Gellibrand. Allan renamed the Barratt as the Gellibrand River in honour of the man whose remains he considered to have found. In 1846, the Gadubanud who remained near Cape Otway were exterminated by a militia of Barrabool men organised by Captain Foster Fyans.

An alternative hypothesis as to the loss of the party is offered by Esher Murray in "the Plains of Imaroo" copyright 1974 Printed Geelong Henwood and Dancey Pty Ltd. Page 22. 22nd Feb 1837 Gellibrand accompanied by Hesse left indented Head near Geelong intending to proceed to Melbourne by way of the Barwon and Leigh rivers and the Werribee plains. They were never heard of again and the 136 year old mystery is still unsolved. Edward Tregutha, Master of the vessel which conveyed Gelligrand and Hesse from Launceston to Indented Head believed they took a direct routed to Melbourne and were drowned when attempting to cross the Werribee River at that time in Flood. In June 1837 Edward Hobson of Port Phillip wrote that Buckley (the man who could speak aboriginal language and English) had been out for three weeks and had failed to gain information from the natives or any clue in the way of clothing. Hobson too believed Gellibrand and Hesse had drowned attempting to cross the flooded River.

As evidence for this plausible explanation Murray cites a letter written By Elizabeth Wedge (Mrs King 23 June 1852) describing the sudden rising of the waters of The Werribee River which swept away the house of The Wedge family into the Bay and father mother and daughter. The property was on the lower Werribee River 25 miles from Melbourne, on the west side for the stream lying between high banks which ran along the margins of the river creating a funnel effect.

The Werribee River, originally called the EX or EXe or Arndell, took its name from the aboriginal name for skeleton. The river arose in the Blackwood ranges through Bacchus Marsh thence across the plains, through the later surveyed Werribee town and emptied in the Bay. In its 56 miles course it is fed by the Toolern, Djerriwarrah, Colmadai, Myriniong, and Parwan Creeks and the Lerderderg River. A limpid stream, it can change precipitously into water-destroying flash flood which carries bridges, cattle and sheep homes, trees in path to the bay, as described by Elizabeth Wedge's letter. The first bridge built was washed away in such a flood at Werribee. Buckley had lived some 30 years with the Aboriginals and had been present when Batman signed his dubious land purchase and would have been able to communicate with the tribes in search for three weeks as to the possible fate of the two men. Relationships with the tribes do appear to be somewhat harmonious when early Members of the Port Phillip association arrived with flocks. Gellibrand had shown his respect and sensitivity for natives in additional material on this site and unlikely to cause hostility, being sensitive to dogmatic rules from Government and his clashes with same.

== Legacy ==
Gellibrand married and was survived by at least three sons, one of whom, Walter Angus Gellibrand, was a member of the Tasmanian Legislative Council from 1871 to 1893, and was its president from 1884 to 1889. Another son, Thomas Lloyd Gellibrand, became the father of Major General Sir John Gellibrand, K.C.B., D.S.O., who was born in 1872. His youngest daughter, Mary Selina (1837–1903), played an important part in the Tasmanian Society for the Prevention of Cruelty to Animals.

The Australian electoral Division of Gellibrand, Mount Gellibrand, Point Gellibrand, the township of Gellibrand, Gellibrand St (Queenscliff), and the Gellibrand River are named after him.

== See also ==
- List of people who disappeared mysteriously (pre-1910)

== Books ==
- P. C. James, 'Gellibrand, Joseph Tice (1792? - 1837)', Australian Dictionary of Biography, Volume 1, Melbourne University Press, 1966, pp 437–438. Retrieved 1 November 2008
- Museum Victoria, Encounters: A History of Aboriginal People in Victoria, J. T. Gellibrand.
