= Gellibrand River =

Perennial river in Victoria, Australia

Gellibrand ()
- Location of the Gellibrand River mouth in Victoria
- Etymology: In honour of Joseph Gellibrand
- Native name: Barrat (Gadubanud)

Location
- Country: Australia
- State: Victoria
- Region: South East Coastal Plain (IBRA), The Otways
- Local government area: Colac Otway Shire

Physical characteristics
- Source: Otway Ranges
  - location: near Upper Gellibrand
  - coordinates: 38°31′58″S 143°36′27″E
  - elevation: 356 m (1,168 ft)
- Mouth: Bass Strait
  - location: Princetown
  - coordinates: 38°42′23″S 143°9′27″E
  - elevation: 0 m (0 ft)
- Length: 96 km (60 mi)

Basin features
- River system: Corangamite catchment
- Tributaries
  - left: Carlisle River
- National parks: Great Otway; Port Campbell

The Gellibrand River is a perennial river of the Corangamite catchment, in the Otways region of the Australian state of Victoria.

== Location and features ==
The Gellibrand River rises in the Otway Ranges in southwest Victoria, near the locality of Upper Gellibrand in the Beech Forest. The river flows in a highly meandering course generally west, and then south by west through the Great Otway National Park and Port Campbell National Park, joined by fourteen tributaries including the Carlisle River, before reaching its river mouth at Princetown Beach and emptying into the Great Australian Bight, at the locality of Princetown. From its highest point, the river descends 256 metres (840 ft) over its 94-kilometre (58 mi) course.

In its upper reaches, the river is impounded by the West Gellibrand Dam.

== Etymology ==
The river was named after Joseph Gellibrand, a solicitor and colonist from England. In 1844 George Allan, a pioneer pastoralist of the Allansford region, recovered what was widely regarded as the remains of Gellibrand near to the river and subsequently named it after him. Gellibrand had previously gone missing in the Otway region on an expedition in 1837.

The local Gadubanud name for the river was Barrat.

== See also ==
- List of rivers of Australia § Victoria
