= Henry Gellibrand =

English mathematician

Henry Gellibrand (1597–1637) was an English mathematician. He is known for his work on the Earth's magnetic field. He discovered that magnetic declination – the angle of dip of a compass needle – is not constant but changes over time. He announced this in 1635, relying on previous observations by others, which had not yet been correctly interpreted.

He was the son of the physician Henry Gellibrand (1568–1615) and Mary Faversham. His four younger brothers were John, Edward, Thomas and Samuel. Samuel Gellibrand became a prominent seventeenth-century London bookseller.

He also devised a method for measuring longitude, based on eclipses. The mathematical tables of Henry Briggs, consisting of logarithms of trigonometric functions, were published by Gellibrand in 1633 as Trigonometria Britannica.

He was Professor at Gresham College, succeeding Edmund Gunter in 1626. He was buried in St Peter le Poer, a London church that was demolished in 1907.

== See also ==
- History of geomagnetism
- List of geophysicists
