= William Clarke Gellibrand =

English merchant in Russia (1791–1884)

William Clark(e) Gellibrand (1791–1884) was an English merchant in the Russian Empire.

== Early life ==
He was the elder son of William Gellibrand (1765–1840), who emigrated from the United Kingdom to Van Diemen's Land at the end of 1823 with Joseph Tice Gellibrand. Their mother was Sophia Louisa Hinde or Hynde (1759–1793), of Hampstead. The Gellibrand family were at Brentford from 1792 to 1805, when William Gellibrand gave up his ministry which was at the Brentford Butts presbyterian chapel, built 1783, with Hugh Ronalds in the congregation; his wife died in 1793.

William Clarke Gellibrand was a schoolfellow in Brentford of Percy Bysshe Shelley at the academy run by the Rev. Alexander Greenlaw, Zion House or Sion House or Syon House; he told Augustine Birrell an anecdote of that time.

== Russia merchant ==
Gellibrand became involved in the Russia trade as a partner in J. Hubbard & Co. with John Hubbard, father of John Gellibrand Hubbard. There was a family connection: Hubbard's wife Marian(ne) Morgan was the step-daughter of Thomas Gellibrand of Carshalton, who was partner in a calico mill.

Initially Gellibrand was in partnership with Thomas Holliday; that partnership at Moscow was dissolved in 1828. He went on to be a merchant at St Petersburg, with an interest with the cotton mills there, and was resident in Russia for 35 years. He is also credited with a major role in the British part in the Baltic timber trade, was involved as a merchant in flax, and had a base on Lake Onega.

William Ropes, Gellibrand's future father-in-law, came to St Petersburg in 1831. He cooperated initially with the financier Baron Alexander von Stieglitz, for protection, and set up a company, William Ropes & Co. When he left for London in 1837, Gellibrand, William Hooper Ropes and George Prince took over the running of the company. Gellibrand also had a 20% stake in a Hubbard & Co. cotton mill, set up in 1842.

== Retirement in England ==
In retirement, Gellibrand lived at Albyns, Stapleford Abbotts, given as his address from 1857. He was on the committee of the British and Foreign Bible Society from that year to 1875.

== Family, associations and interests ==
Gellibrand married, firstly, Elizabeth Parkinson, who died in 1833. He married, secondly, Mary Tyler Ropes (born 1812) in 1834: she was the daughter of the merchant William Ropes of Salem, Massachusetts. Both marriages were childless. Richard Knill, minister in St Petersburg for the London Missionary Society, wrote an account of the personal impact in 1831 of the 1826–1837 cholera pandemic, and mentions that Elizabeth Gellibrand took in the young orphaned daughter of Mrs Chapman, who taught at a Lancasterian school and died of cholera.

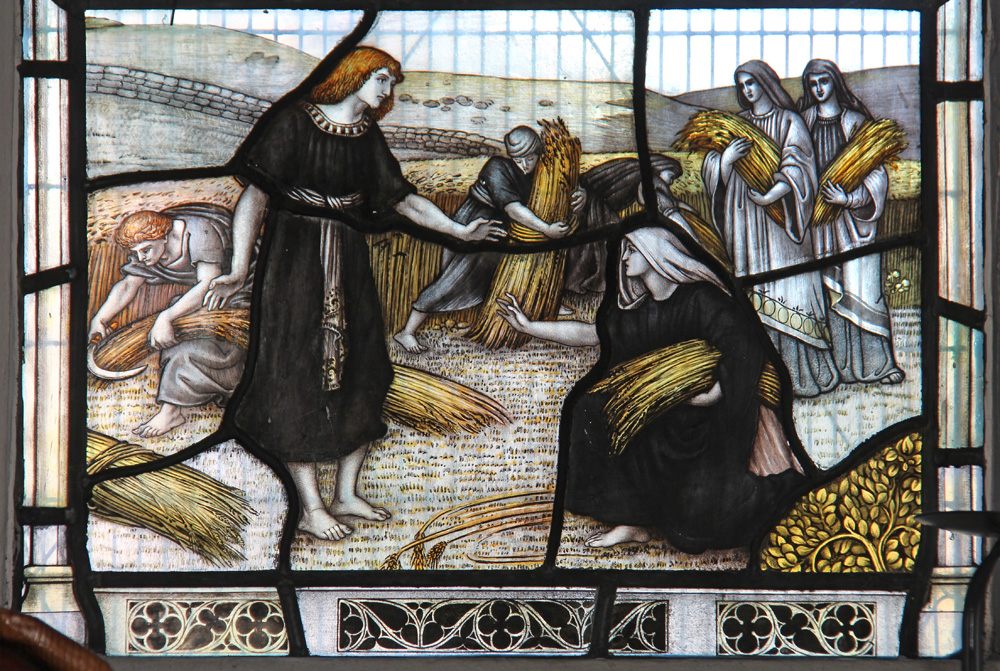
Stained glass window at St Mary's Church, Chigwell, showing Mary of Bethany, given in memory of Mary Gellibrand by the vicar the Rev. Thomas Marsden

Mary Gellibrand distributed Dorcas society tracts in St Petersburg. She died in 1894 at the Manor House Chigwell; and left money to the American Board of Commissioners for Foreign Missions. Mary's brother William Hooper Ropes, who moved to Russia in 1833, and went into business with Gellibrand, married Ellen Harriet Hall, daughter of J. Drinkrow Hall of Scarborough. His wife was a niece of Gellibrand's first wife. The lyricist Adrian Ross (Arthur Reed Ropes) was their son. The wife of George Prince, partner in Ropes & Co., was Marian Amelia Hall, daughter of John Drinkrow Hall and his wife Harriet Parkinson, and sister of Ellen Harriet.

The Gellibrands had a dacha outside St Petersburg, on the road to Petergof. Horatio Storer visited there in 1847.

John Hubbard's younger son William Egerton Hubbard was also in St Petersburg, and his daughter Louisa Hubbard was born there in 1836. William Egerton Hubbard's wife Louisa, Mary Gellibrand, and the wife of the British Embassy chaplain Edward Law worked together on philanthropic relief for needy British families associated with the British Factory.

Both William Ropes Sr. and Gellibrand supported the work of the American Tract Society. Gellibrand supported too the British and Foreign Bible Society in Russia. Through the expatriate British business community and the Factory Chapel and its activities, Gellibrand knew also Anna McNeill Whistler. He was in correspondence in 1849 with the Foreign Evangelical Society (founded 1839, from that year the American and Foreign Christian Union) who were sending money for colportage in Russia. He was involved in sending donations for the relief of famine in the Grand Duchy of Finland in 1857.

=== Visitors at Albyns ===
Anna McNeill Whistler's biographers write "She spent at least a week every summer or autumn" at Albyns. Piers Claughton, the Anglican Bishop of Colombo, stayed in 1869.
