= Little Aire Falls =

Waterfall in Victoria, Australia

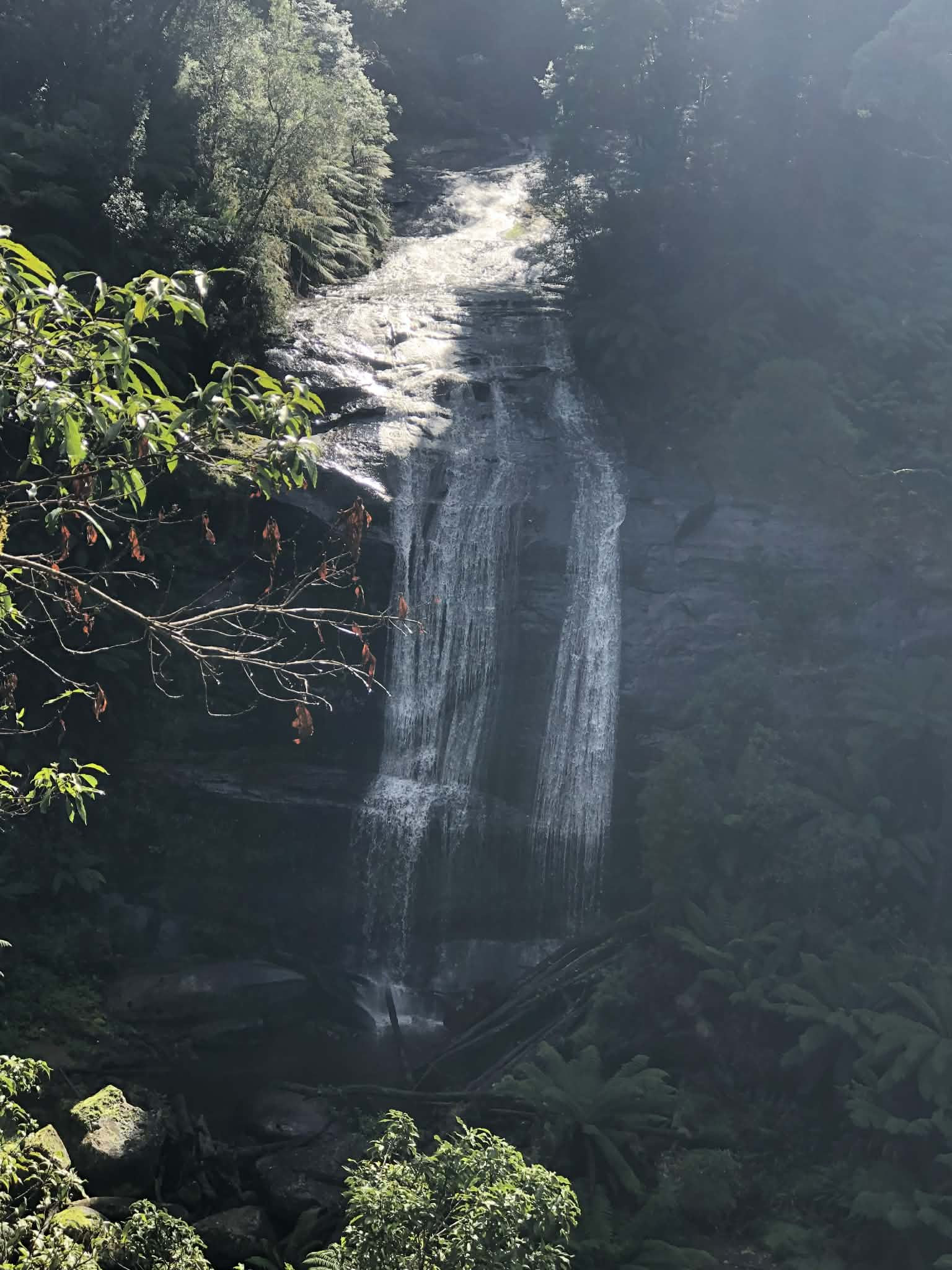
- Little Aire Falls, 2025

- Location within Victoria
- Location: Geelong, Victoria, Australia
- Coordinates: 38°40′04″S 143°30′41″E
- Type: Plunge
- Total height: 30.78 m (101.0 ft)
- Number of drops: 1
- Watercourse: Little Aire Creek

Little Aire Falls is a waterfall located in the Otway Ranges, in the locality of Beech Forest, Victoria, Australia. The waterfall's diminutive name derives from the Little Aire Creek, a tributary of the Aire River. The waterfall contains a singular drop, with a total height of 101 feet (31 m).

== History ==
The waterfall was first photographed and featured in a newspaper as early as 1903, with Charles Lamond Forrest (the namesake for the nearby town of Forrest) being a group member on that trip.

In 2005, the Victorian Government announced that a considerable amount of investment into tourism would take place in the Otways, as logging would be eventually phased out in the area by 2008. These improvements included better access to Little Aire Falls and nearby Triplet Falls, with the construction of walking tracks.

== Access and features ==
Access to the waterfall from Beech Forrest is via Phillips Track. The end of the track is marked by a car park, from where a 2.5 kilometre (5 km return) walking track takes visitors to a lookout facing the waterfall. Trees along the walking track include mountain ash and myrtle beech.

== See also ==
- Erskine Falls
- Great Ocean Road
- Hopetoun Falls
- List of waterfalls
- List of waterfalls in Australia
- Triplet Falls
- Twelve Apostles
