= Stevensons Falls =

Waterfall in Victoria, Australia

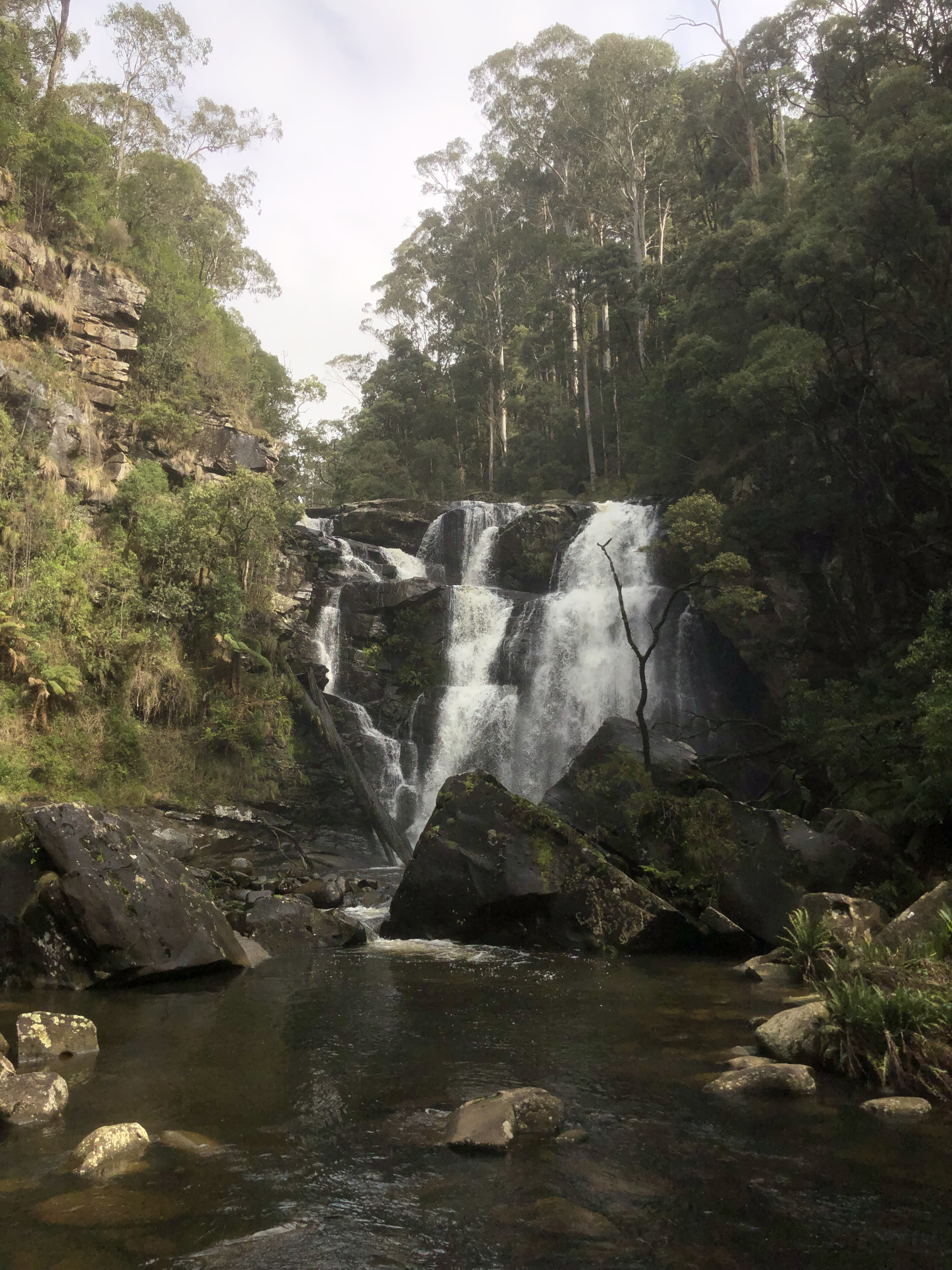
- Stevensons Falls

- Location within Victoria
- Location: Barramunga, Victoria, Australia
- Coordinates: 38°34′33″S 143°39′26″E
- Type: Plunge
- Total height: 22.74 m (74.6 ft)
- Number of drops: 1
- Watercourse: Gellibrand River

Stevensons Falls is a waterfall on the Gellibrand River in the Otway Ranges within the locality of Barramunga, Victoria, Australia. The waterfall consists of a single drop measuring approximately 22.74 metres. It is a popular tourist destination, seeing around 80,000 visitors every year, and is accompanied by a campground, picnic facilities, and walking tracks.

== History ==
Stevensons Falls is named after the Stevenson brothers, early European settlers in the district whose property was situated near the Gellibrand River.

In 1904, one of the Stevenson brothers discovered four Aboriginal stone tomahawks beside the river. Four years later in 1908, he also uncovered the skeletal remains of Aboriginal people nearby.

The Stevenson family experienced a number of natural disasters during their time in the district. On 13 February 1919, a bushfire swept through the area and reached close to the family's homestead, although the building was ultimately saved. Less than a month later, on 4 March, exceptionally heavy rainfall caused severe flooding along the Gellibrand River. Floodwaters rose high enough to surround the homestead, reaching the top of the garden fence. To escape, the two Stevenson brothers constructed a raft to carry their elderly mother, along with a woman and child, while the brothers swam alongside to guide the raft to safety.

Gary Roe, a motorbike rider from Warrnambool, was killed whilst riding in the area, on 13 October 2002. A small memorial plaque has been placed beside the road leading to the waterfall.

In 2024, the area surrounding the waterfall was significantly upgraded, with the Victorian Government providing $2.35 million. This was spent on the construction of an all abilities-accessible viewing platform, walking trails, a toilet block, parking, and a pedestrian bridge.

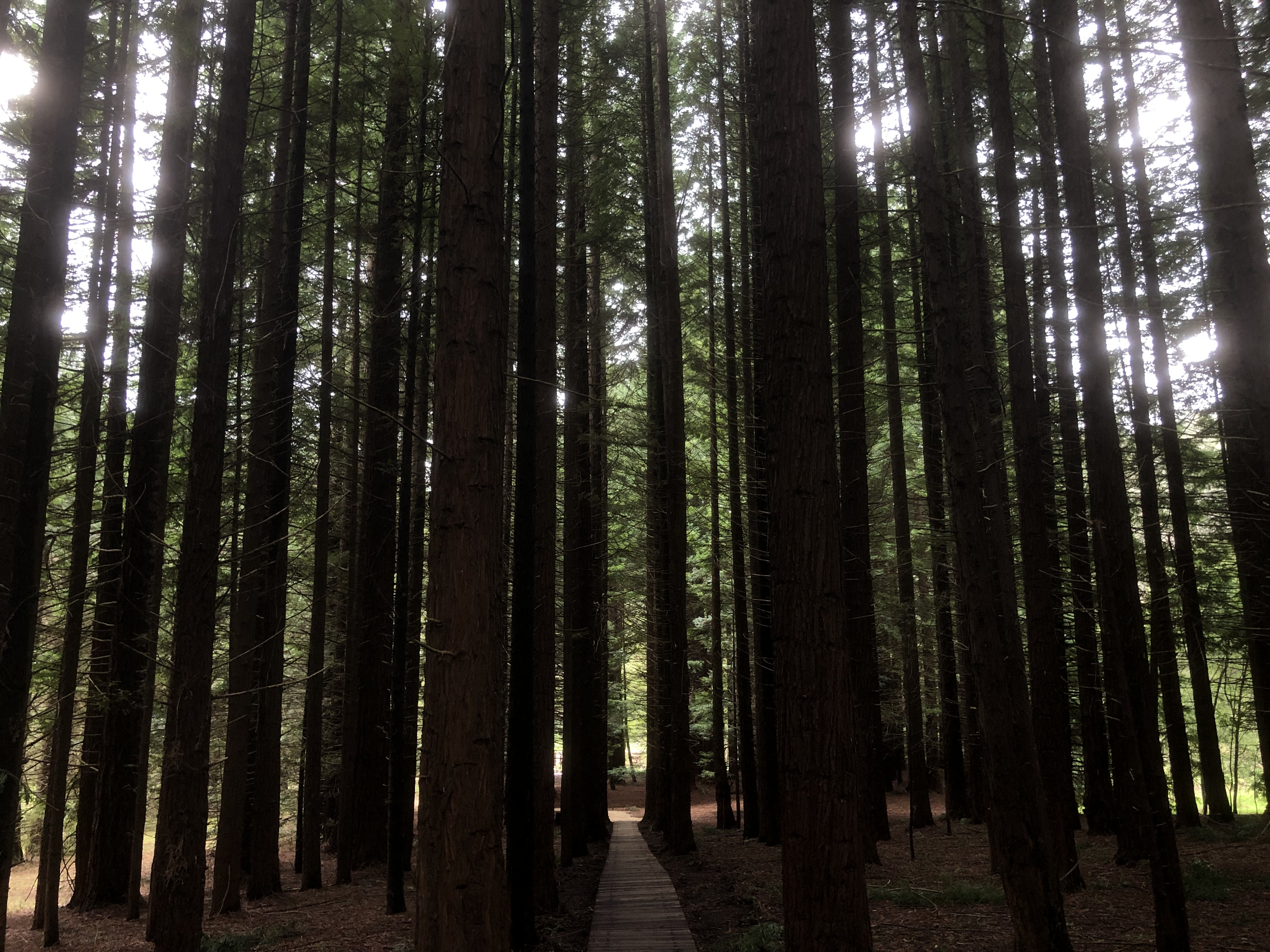
A forest adjacent to the waterfall

== Features and access ==
From Forrest-Apollo Bay Road, the Upper Gellibrand Road descends for five kilometres, which leads to the campground. From the campground, another road leads to the day visitor area, where parking can be found. Several walks leading out from the car park join together towards the waterfall, the walks passing by Douglas fir trees, Californian redwoods and blue spruces.

== See also ==
- Erskine Falls
