= William Gellibrand (settler) =

William Gellibrand (1765–1840) was a nonconformist preacher in England who left the United Kingdom at the end of 1823 for Van Diemen's Land (later Tasmania). He settled there, with family including his son Joseph Tice Gellibrand, and ran a successful farm and commercial business.

== Life in England ==
He was the son of Rev. Joseph Gellibrand of Edmonton, Middlesex and his wife Elizabeth Tice. Richard Hengist Horne wrote in 1873, mentioning that the Rev. Dr. Tice who lived there was the uncle of the Australian settler William Tice Gellibrand. Horne himself was brought up in Edmonton, from 1810, by Sarah Tice, his father James Horne's mother, and stated that Dr Tice was his grandfather. The Gellibrands were a prominent nonconformist family in Kent. Thomas Gellibrand was a nonconformist minister at Ashford, Kent, from 1729 to 1773, and was married to Grace Clarke of Ashford. He was succeeded at Ashford by their son Joseph Gellibrand, minister there from 1773 to 1783; when he was succeeded by his brother-in-law Evan Davis.

Joseph Gellibrand had been a student at Daventry Academy under Joseph Priestley, leaving in 1754 after starting at its precursor at Northampton in 1749, under Philip Doddridge. He was a minister at Tottenham, and Edmonton. He was mentioned in Bibliotheca Britannica as the author of a poem, published in 1783, to the memory of Sir John Clarke, 5th Baronet, who died in 1782.

On his own account, William Gellibrand was sent to the Hoxton Academy of the Coward Trust (Congregationalist, Wellclose Square) around 1781, but then became a preacher at Newington Green Meeting House (Unitarian). His later published account of his change of views was subject to some criticism, for example in the Monthly Repository.

When William Gellibrand married Sophia Hinde in 1788, he was a minister in Ringwood, Hampshire. His ministry there lasted from 1788 to 1792.

The Gellibrand family were at Brentford from 1792 to 1805, when William Gellibrand gave up his ministry which was at the Brentford Butts presbyterian chapel, built 1783, with Hugh Ronalds in the congregation; his wife died in 1793. The Rev. Joseph Gellibrand died in 1806; a monumental inscription in Edmonton churchyard read "In Memory of The Rev^{d}. Joseph Gellibrand Who died March 29th 1806, aged 74 years." It gave his time as pastor in Edmonton as 18 years, and his wife Elizabeth's death date as 1824. A newspaper report states that Elizabeth Gellibrand, widow of the Rev. Joseph Gellibrand, died in Edmonton on 24 August 1824.

Gellibrand married again, at the end of 1811, when he was of Horn Hill, near Chorleywood, to Mrs. Leivers of Chalfont St Peter, Buckinghamshire. He was living in Chalfont St Peter when he emigrated, in 1823.

== Voyage on the Hibernia ==
Gellibrand emigrated with his son Joseph Tice, for the sake of Joseph's health. He took the advice of Sir John Owen, 1st Baronet to go to Van Diemen's Land, which until 1825 was part of the Colony of New South Wales. Owen's brother Edward Lord, who had become a major landowner there, was in England in 1823. According to the Clyde Company Papers, Owen was a contact made through Joseph's stepmother, and he persuaded Henry Bathurst, 3rd Earl Bathurst, Secretary of State for War and the Colonies, to nominate Joseph as Attorney-General of Van Diemen's Land.

William Gellibrand, his son Joseph with his wife, and their son Thomas Lloyd Gellibrand, sailed from England via the Cape of Good Hope to Hobart on the Hibernia. She left Plymouth on 9 November 1823, and arrived at Hobart on 15 March 1824. William St Paul Gellibrand, another son of Joseph, was born on the journey, off Île Saint-Paul on 18 December 1823. Joseph's elder brother, William Clarke Gellibrand, born 1791, is not mentioned in connection with the journey.

== On South Arm ==
William Gellibrand was the original grantee of South Arm, on what is now the South Arm Peninsula on the Derwent Estuary in Tasmania, dividing the estuary from Ralphs Bay. The Gellibrand family grave vault is on Mary Ann Bay, to the west side near the point of the peninsula. The land grant was of 2,000 acres (810 ha), and Gellibrand was assigned the labour of ten resident convicts whom he housed. He wrote a letter to the local newspaper about the water supply, published on 11 February 1825. In it he stated that he had been told initially that the South Arm water, limited to one spring, was inadequate, but that he had successfully sunk wells.

William Gellibrand built a large home on the northern end of the peninsula known as "Arm End". James Backhouse visited Gellibrand at home on 20 September 1832, with Robert Mather, and also talked to one of the convicts working there. He wrote

Peach and almond trees are coming into blossom in the well-stocked garden. The native grass of the country is thin; but the land in tillage yields a fair return. The intelligent proprietor pays more attention than most persons, to the comfort and morals of his assigned servants.

== Investor and public life ==
Arriving from England with capital amounting to £3,000, Gellibrand farmed and went into exporting; he had also banking and whaling interests.

Gellibrand was appointed a Justice of the Peace. In 1826 William and Joseph set up what they called the Tasmanian Bank, a competitor to the Bank of Van Diemen's Land. Joseph Gellibrand had a land grant at Sorell of an estate he called Kimbolton. William and Joseph Gellibrand jointly won a trespass action concerning the estate boundary against Edward Lord, of the neighbouring Lawrenny estate, in 1828. That year, a clash between William and Joseph Gellibrand and Sir George Arthur, governor of Van Diemen's Land, came to a head, after William had criticised Arthur at meetings, and Joseph pursued an independent line as Attorney-General. William Gellibrand ceased to be a magistrate, from 1828 to 1832.

In 1834 Gellibrand chaired a meeting of a local missionary society, which resolved to write for support to Henry Forster Burder, John Burnet, John Blackburn and William Ellis. In 1835 he belonged to the Political Association that requested legal and policing reform from the Governor George Arthur.

== Death and legacy ==
William Gellibrand died at Hobart on 27 September 1840, aged 75. The South Arm estate was left to his grandson George Henry Blake Gellibrand, the fifth child of Joseph Tice Gellibrand. George Gellibrand farmed at South Arm himself, but also sold off some of the land in 1844.

Arm End at Gellibrand Point, the headland at the north end of the South Arm Peninsula, is now part of the Gellibrand Point Nature Recreation Area. It is part of the traditional land of the Mumirimina People.

== Works ==
- The Confessions of an Arian Minister (1817)

It is addressed to "My Dear Son", from Horn Hill. An anonymous reviewer in the Monthly Repository commented on Gellibrand's move away from Arianism in terms of an "earlier lack of scholarly effort" in scriptural studies.
