= Triplet Falls =

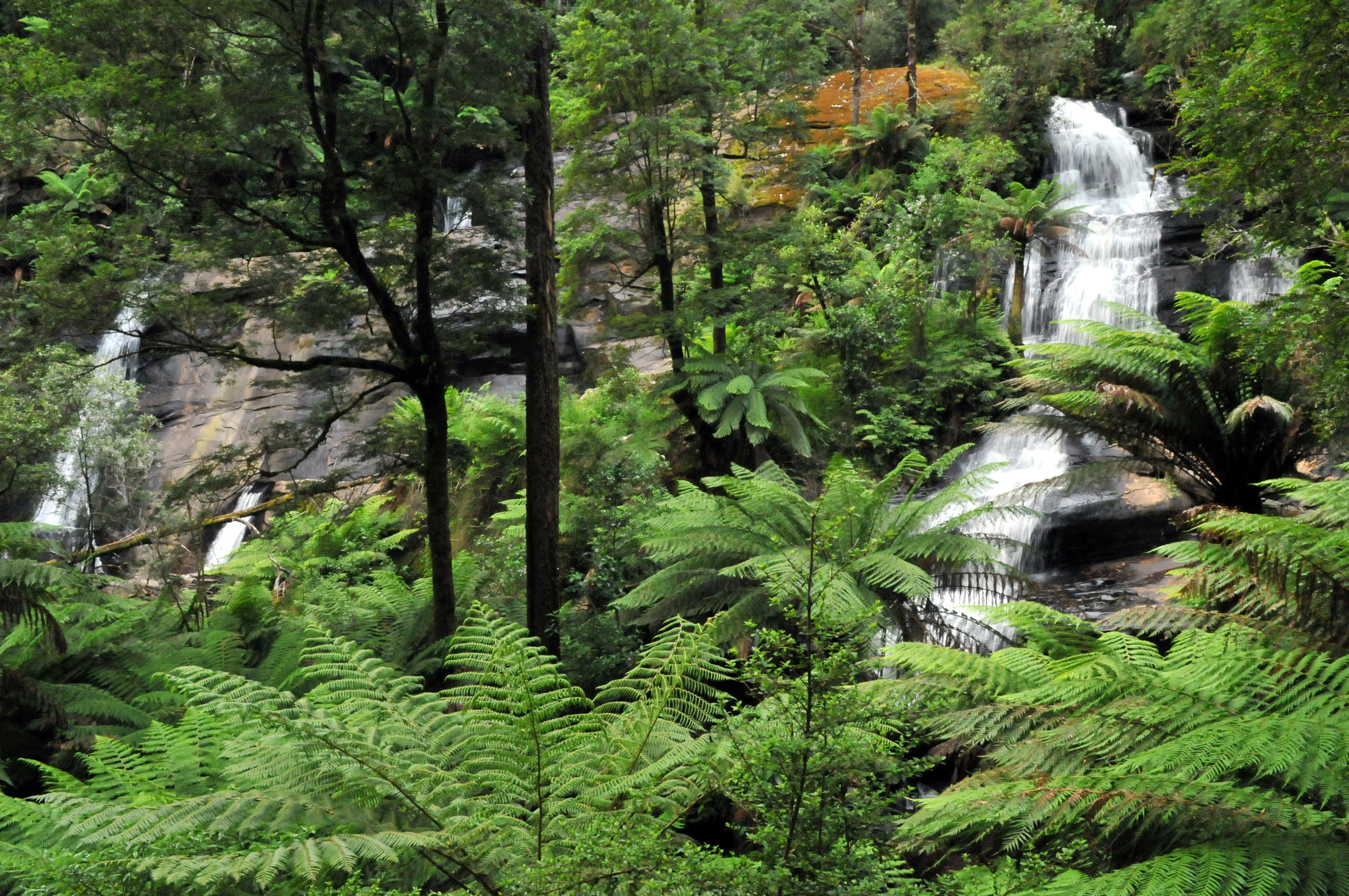
- Triplet Falls in the Great Otway National Park

- Location within Victoria
- Location: Great Otway National Park, Victoria, Australia
- Coordinates: 38°40′16″S 143°29′35″E
- Type: Segmented
- Number of drops: numerous
- Watercourse: Young Creek

The Triplet Falls are waterfalls located in the Great Otway National Park of Victoria, in eastern Australia, 200 km (approximately 125 mi) from Melbourne via Colac and Gellibrand, or 70 km (approximately 43 mi) from Apollo Bay.

The falls are fed by the Young Creek and as the name suggests there are three falls that cascade over a lush rainforest to the floor of the valley. The three streams normally flow when there has been significant rain upstream, so it is not uncommon to see only one or two streams flowing.

Triplet Falls are nestled amongst the ancient forests of mountain ash and myrtle beech.

== See also ==
- List of waterfalls
- List of waterfalls in Australia
- Little Aire Falls
- Sabine Falls
- Slender Falls
