= Hopetoun Falls =

Waterfall in Victoria, Australia

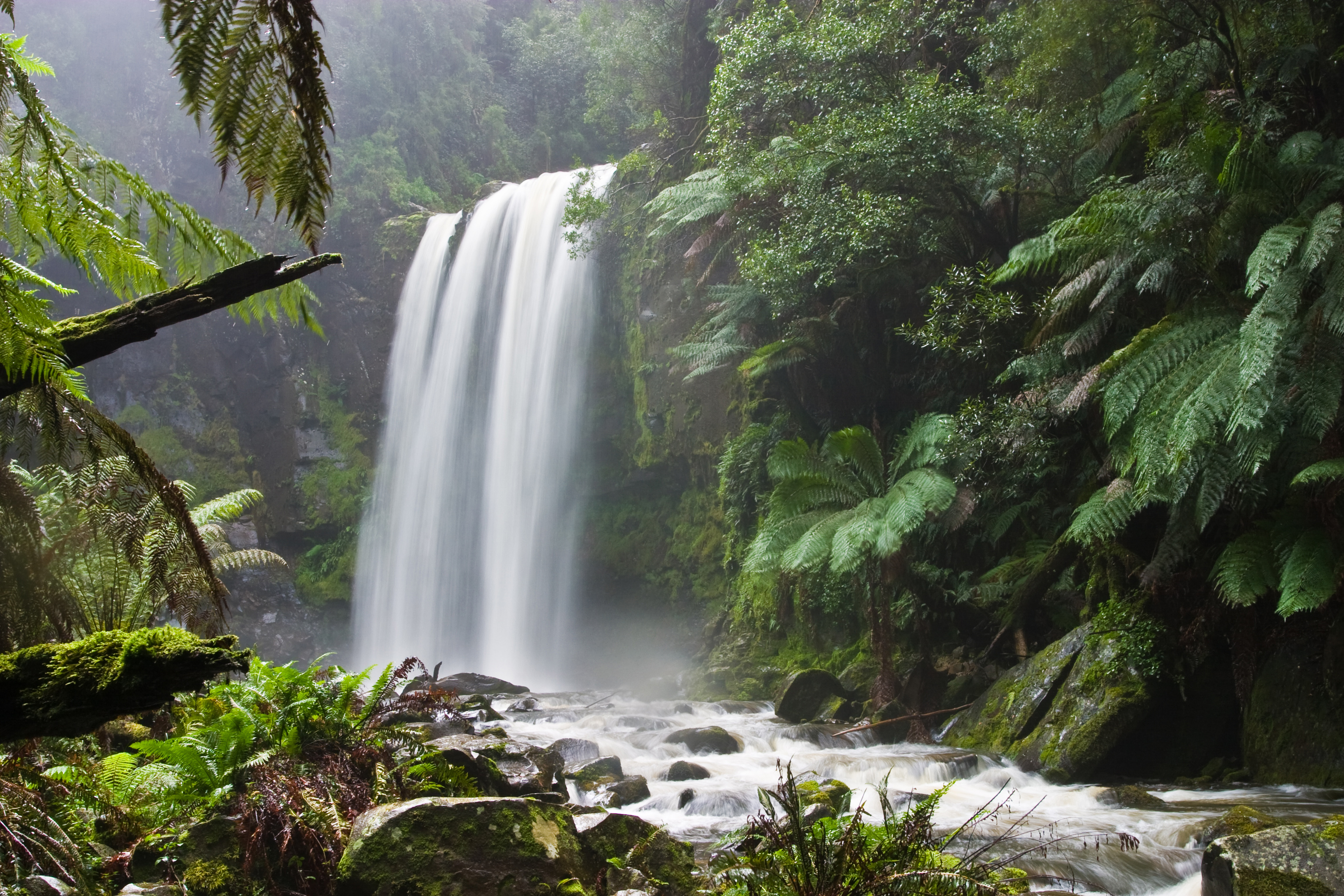
- Hopetoun Falls

- Location within Victoria
- Location: Otway Ranges, Victoria, Australia
- Coordinates: 38°40′04″S 143°34′13″E
- Type: Plunge
- Elevation: 314 m (1,030 ft)
- Total height: 17.94 m (58.9 ft)
- Number of drops: 1
- Watercourse: Aire River

Hopetoun Falls is a waterfall across the Aire River that is located in the Otways region of Victoria, Australia. The waterfall consists of a single drop, with a height of 17.94 metres.

== History ==
The waterfall was originally known as Birch Falls, or Aire (sometimes rendered as 'Ayre') Falls. The waterfalls were renamed after a visit on 1st February 1895 by Lord Hopetoun, the Marquess of Linlithgow, who was Governor of Victoria at the time. Later that year, William Hose Bullivant, a councillor, persuaded landowner Edward Hall to reserve land around the waterfall for the public, which was eventually accepted.

== Location and features ==
The falls are located approximately 5 kilometres (3.1 mi) south of the locality of Beech Forest at an elevation of 314 metres (1,030 ft) above sea level and range between 45–49 metres (148–161 ft) in height. Hopetoun Falls adjacent to the Apollo Bay – Beech Forest Road about 4 kilometres (2.5 mi) south of the Beauchamp Falls turnoff and roughly 20 kilometres (12 mi) northwest of the coastal town of Apollo Bay.

Much attention has been given to preserving the natural characteristics of Hopetoun Falls while allowing ample access for visitors. The falls have a large set of well-built and maintained stairs that lead down a natural patio to a viewing platform very close to the foot of the waterfall. Hopetoun Falls plunges 30 m in a rectangular shape.

== See also ==
- List of waterfalls in Australia
- List of waterfalls
