= Great Otway National Park =

National park in Australia

- IUCN category II (national park)
- Lake Elizabeth, formed from a landslide in 1952. It broke its banks allowing the West Barwon River to flow.

- Location within Victoria
- Location: Victoria
- Nearest city: Apollo Bay
- Coordinates: 38°46′24″S 143°33′27″E
- Area: 1,031 km^{2} (398 sq mi)
- Established: 11 December 2005
- Governing body: Parks Victoria
- Website: Official website

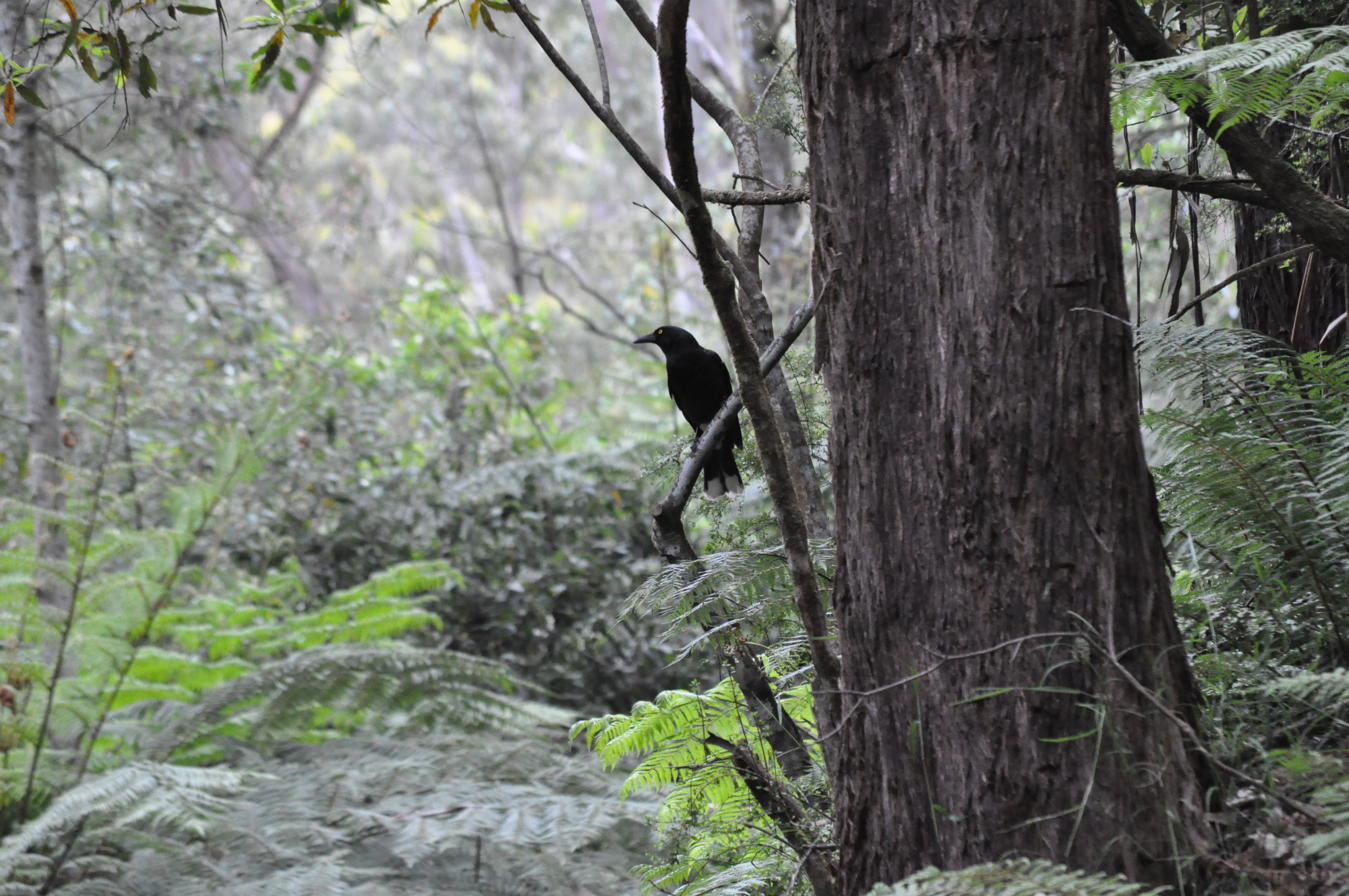
Pied Currawong on the walk to Triplet Falls

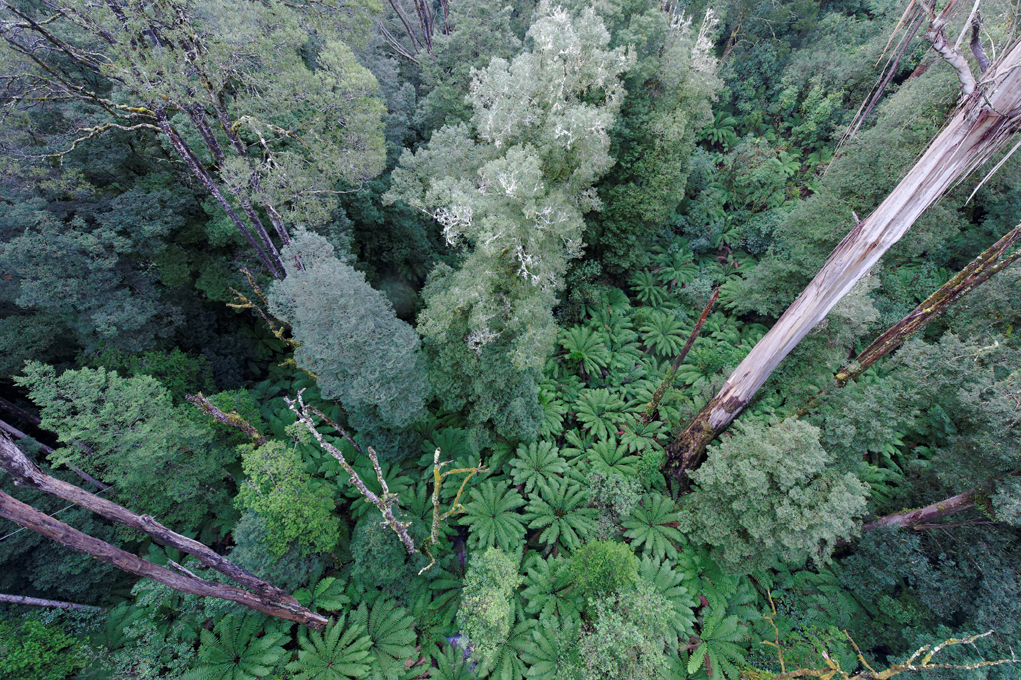
Great Otway National Park

The Great Otway National Park is a national park located in the Barwon South West region of Victoria, Australia. The 103,185-hectare (254,980-acre) national park is situated approximately 162 kilometres (101 mi) southwest of Melbourne, in the Otway Ranges, a low coastal mountain range; its highest peak is Mount Cowley, 670 metres (2,198 feet), and is within the park. The park contains a diverse range of landscapes and vegetation types.

== History ==
Commercial logging began in the Otway Ranges in the 1880s. As roads and railways improved, logging increased massively, peaking in 1961, almost entirely stripping the Otway Ranges of its old-growth forest and causing land degradation issues, but has since been greatly reduced. The forest standing today highlights the lengthy period needed to regrow the giant trees of the past and to reproduce the ecological complexity close to that of the original wild forests. Historically, several bushfires have burnt through the park's predecessor reserves, shaping its ecology and plant and animal diversity. The last major fire was part of the Ash Wednesday bushfires that swept southeastern Australia in 1983.

The park was declared in 2004 when Otway National Park, Angahook-Lorne State Park, Carlisle State Park, Melba Gully State Park, areas of the Otway State Forest and a number of Crown Land reserves were combined into one park. The parks were combined after a campaign by the local community and the Otway Ranges Environment Network and was officially gazetted on 11 December 2005.

== Features ==
The Great Otway National Park is popular with Victorian, interstate, and international tourists, with a number of companies operating tours in the region. It contains three camping areas at Johanna, Aire River and Blanket Bay. The park is accessed from the east via Apollo Bay, from the north via Forrest or Beech Forest, or from the west via Princetown. The park covers both coastline and hinterland in the Otway Ranges and so includes both beaches and forest, accessible via walking trails. The park and the Aire River campground are home to a significant koala population. The Cape Otway Lighthouse is adjacent to the park and is open to tourists throughout the week. Migrating whales and dolphins such as southern right and southern humpback, and bottlenose dolphins can be observed from the coasts.

Glow worms (Arachnocampa otwayensis), which are the bioluminescent larvae of small flies known as fungus gnats, can be seen at night along the stream banks and walking tracks, particularly at Angahook-Lorne State Park, Beauchamp Falls, Hopetoun Falls, Stevenson Falls and Melba Gully State Park.

=== Important Bird Area ===
The park has been identified by BirdLife International as an Important Bird Area (IBA) because it supports populations of rufous bristlebirds, striated fieldwrens and pink robins, as well as numerous other species.

== Climate ==
The area has a very wet temperate oceanic climate (Cfb).

Climate data for the Otway Ranges are sourced from Weeaproinah, at an elevation of 492 metres (1,614 ft); operating between 1965 and 2012. The Otway Ranges feature a cold rainforest biome with extreme winter rainfall, which owes to its highly exposed location in the far south-west of the state. Heavy snowfalls occur on the higher peaks each year, such as Mount Cowley at 670 metres (2,200 ft); wet snow can also fall nearer to sea level on rare occasions.

It has the greatest amount of precipitation days in mainland Australia (219.4), narrowly beating out Mount William's 215 days, though the latter site has only nineteen years of record.

Climate data for Weeaproinah (1965–2012, rainfall to 1901); 492 m AMSL; 38.64° S, 143.51° E
Month	Jan	Feb	Mar	Apr	May	Jun	Jul	Aug	Sep	Oct	Nov	Dec	Year
Record high °C (°F)	39.4 (102.9)	39.0 (102.2)	35.9 (96.6)	28.5 (83.3)	22.8 (73.0)	16.2 (61.2)	16.4 (61.5)	20.3 (68.5)	25.4 (77.7)	28.1 (82.6)	32.0 (89.6)	36.5 (97.7)	39.4 (102.9)
Mean daily maximum °C (°F)	20.0 (68.0)	20.6 (69.1)	18.3 (64.9)	15.0 (59.0)	11.9 (53.4)	9.6 (49.3)	8.8 (47.8)	9.8 (49.6)	11.4 (52.5)	13.7 (56.7)	16.0 (60.8)	17.9 (64.2)	14.4 (57.9)
Mean daily minimum °C (°F)	10.8 (51.4)	11.5 (52.7)	10.5 (50.9)	8.8 (47.8)	7.2 (45.0)	5.4 (41.7)	4.5 (40.1)	4.7 (40.5)	5.4 (41.7)	6.6 (43.9)	8.1 (46.6)	9.4 (48.9)	7.7 (45.9)
Record low °C (°F)	3.8 (38.8)	4.1 (39.4)	3.0 (37.4)	1.3 (34.3)	−0.1 (31.8)	−0.5 (31.1)	−0.5 (31.1)	−0.6 (30.9)	−0.6 (30.9)	−0.5 (31.1)	−0.1 (31.8)	3.2 (37.8)	−0.6 (30.9)
Average precipitation mm (inches)	87.8 (3.46)	85.8 (3.38)	111.7 (4.40)	154.6 (6.09)	197.1 (7.76)	211.7 (8.33)	226.3 (8.91)	233.9 (9.21)	199.9 (7.87)	174.0 (6.85)	139.3 (5.48)	113.3 (4.46)	1,936.7 (76.25)
Average precipitation days (≥ 0.2 mm)	12.8	11.8	15.6	18.1	20.7	21.5	23.4	23.1	21.1	19.8	16.7	14.8	219.4
Source: Australian Bureau of Meteorology; Weeaproinah

== Fungi ==
The Great Otway National Park is extremely rich in fungal diversity. Although hundreds of species of flora and fauna are listed in the Great Otway National Park Management Plan, there is only a single reference to fungi. The reference is to the fungal pathogen, Chalara australis that affects myrtle beech. However, the great majority of fungi in the Park perform beneficial ecological roles. In fact, most fungi perform positive rather than negative roles. Even parasitic fungi – often regarded only negatively – are a vital part of healthy ecosystems, regulating ecosystem functions.

As primary recyclers of organic matter, saprobic fungi break down fallen branches and leaf litter, making vital nutrients available to other organisms. Other fungi form symbiotic relationships with other organisms. Although rarely acknowledged, the great majority of plants in the Great Otway National Park (indeed in the world) form mutually beneficial mycorrhizal relationships with fungi.

Given the great diversity of plants, specialist habitats and micro-climates in the park, a great diversity of fungi, including lichens, is also expected to occur there. Two hundred and seventy-eight species of fungi are listed in the Atlas of Living Australia. This is likely to be only a fraction of the total number of fungal species that grow in the Park.

Despite their essential roles in underpinning terrestrial ecosystems, fungi are barely recognised as a vital part of Australia's biodiversity. Although Australia has national and state level biodiversity conservation strategies and has ratified international conventions, most overlook fungi. There is currently no statewide biodiversity strategy for managing biodiversity in Victoria and the Colac Otway Shire Environment Strategy makes no reference to fungi. There is however, a great deal of interest in fungi among the local community. The Southern Otways Landcare Network have been actively involved in learning about and surveying the Park's fungi in recent years and produced a guide to one hundred of the more easily recognisable fungal species found in the park.

The Australian citizen-science organisation, Fungimap is also documenting and mapping the distribution of fungi including those that occur in the Great Otway National Park.

One of the tiniest yet conspicuous species found in the wetter parts of the park is the ruby bonnet (Mycena viscidocruenta). The ghost fungus (Omphalotus nidiformis) grows on trees and is another easily recognisable species, especially at night when it glows a pale green. The rosette fungus (Podoscypha petalodes) often appears in funnel-shaped rosettes at the base of trees and among leaf litter and is widespread throughout the park. The flame fungus (Clavaria miniata) grows singly or in groups on soil.

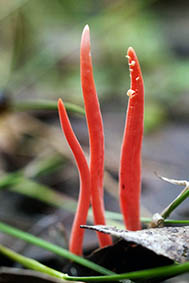
Clavaria miniata (flame fungus)

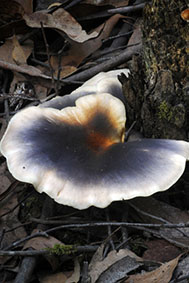
Omphalotus nidiformis

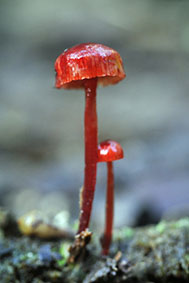
Mycena viscidocruenta

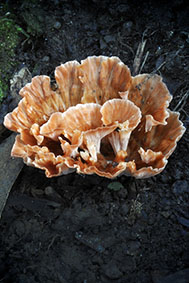
Podoscypha petalodes

== See also ==
- Great Ocean Walk
- Maits Rest
- Protected areas of Victoria
- Triplet Falls
- Strzelecki Ranges
- Redwoods of the Otway Ranges
- List of national parks of Australia
