= Elliot River Falls =

Waterfall in Victoria, Australia

- Location within Victoria
- Location: Apollo Bay, Victoria, Australia
- Coordinates: 38°47′35″S 143°37′08″E
- Type: Plunge
- Total height: 3.52 m (11.5 ft)
- Number of drops: 1
- Watercourse: Elliot River

Elliot River Falls is a waterfall situated in the Otway Ranges, between Cape Otway and Apollo Bay, Victoria, Australia. The waterfall, comprising a single drop of a height of 3.52 metres (11.5 ft), is located immediately upstream of the river mouth of the Elliot River.

== Description and access ==
The river, of which the waterfall gets its name, was named by surveyor George Douglas Smythe. From the Shelly Beach Picnic Ground carpark, the 4.5 kilometres (2.8 mi)-long Elliot River Loop Walk passes close by to the waterfall, with the waterfall a short walk upstream from where the walk crosses the river.

== See also ==
- Geary River Falls
- Upper Geary River Falls
- Iluka Falls
- Mirage Falls
- Parker River Falls
