= Mirage Falls =

Waterfall in Victoria, Australia

- Location within Victoria
- Location: Cape Otway, Victoria, Australia
- Coordinates: 38°50′35″S 143°33′43″E
- Type: Plunge
- Total height: 5.70 m (18.7 ft)
- Number of drops: 1
- Watercourse: (Unnamed creek)

Mirage Falls is a small waterfall located in the Otway Ranges, within the locality of Cape Otway, Victoria, Australia. The waterfall consists of a single drop, with a total height of 5.70 metres (18.7 ft).

== Description ==
The waterfall freefalls over an undercut, with water dispersing at a rock located at the base. It was named and first featured by co-authors and waterfall researches Ian Wacey and Ray Barber in the book 250 Victorian Waterfalls.

== See also ==
- Iluka Falls
- Geary River Falls
- Upper Geary River Falls
- Cape Otway Lighthouse
