= Blanket Bay (Victoria) =

Bay in Victoria, Australia

Coordinates: 38°49′23″S 143°35′20″E

Blanket Bay is a small bay on the coast of Victoria, Australia. The foreshore is part of the Cape Otway National park.

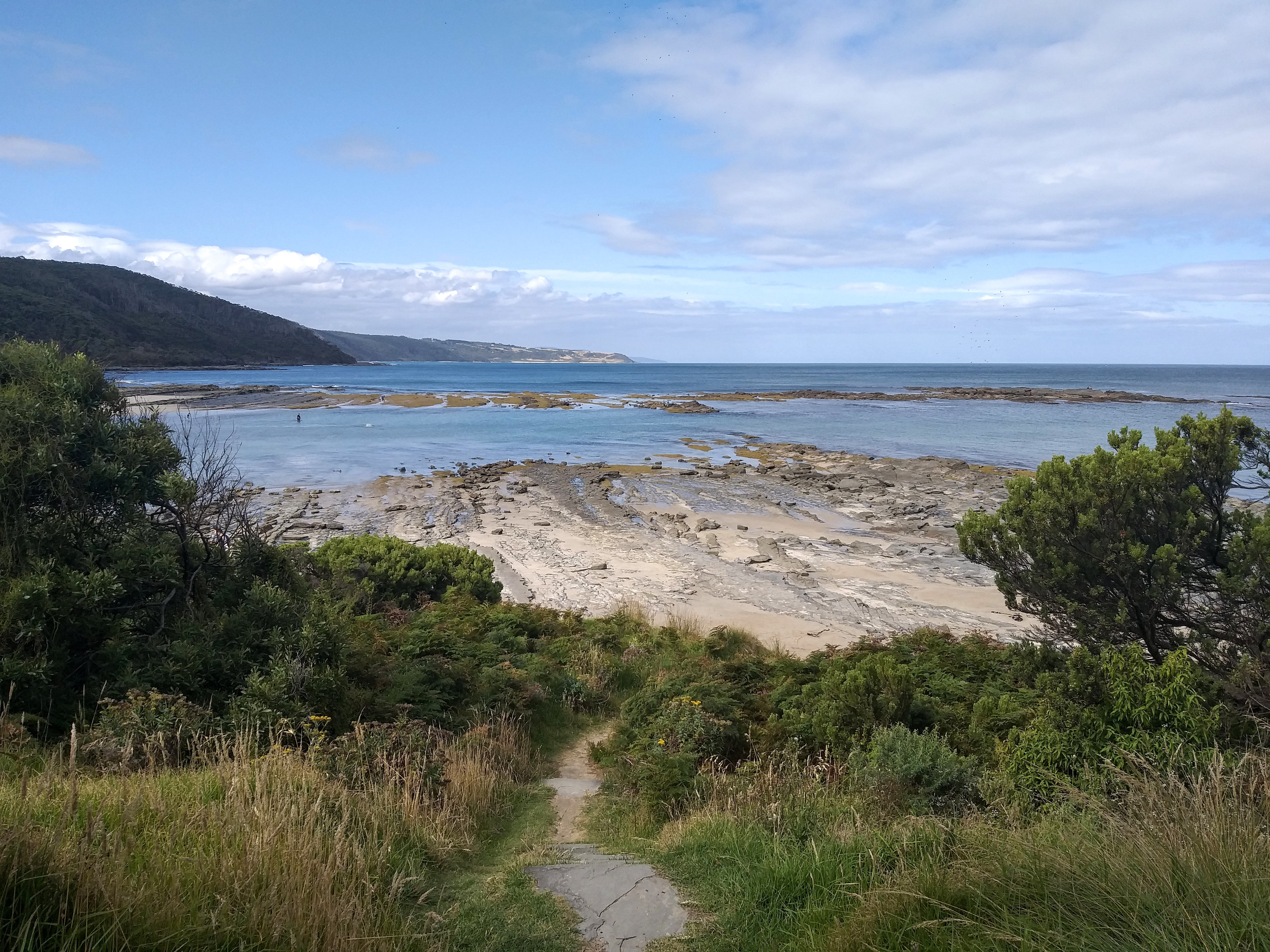
Blanket Bay at low tide.

== Location and features ==
The bay's beach is protected by rock platforms and outer reefs. The bay is surrounded by steep sloping manna gum forests and rugged rock and reef coastline. The sandy beach being about 200 metres long. A creek flows into the beach

The area adjacent to the bay is a camping ground and linked by hiking trails of the Great Ocean Walk.

Remains of the 1880s jetty built for landing supplies can still be seen at low tide.

== History ==
In 1846, a number of Gadubanud aboriginal people where massacred in a revenge expedition, after a member of an early colonial surveying party was killed.

In 1877 a road gang was landed at the bay to construct a track to the Cape Otway lighthouse. Parker River was previously used to delivery provisions to the lighthouse but was deemed too treacherous.

Blanket Bay was once a unloading point for stores arriving by ship to supply the Cape Otway lighthouse that is six kilometers away. It was used for three decades.

In 1896, three mariners (chief officer Mr. Griffiths, able seaman Mathieson, and casual hand Thomas Monk died in rough surf when their boat capsized while coming ashore at Blanket Bay. The Government steamer Lady Loch had left Melbourne port of Williamstown and had docked at Apollo Bay before attempting to deliver six months of provisions for the lighthouse keepers.
