= Marengo Beach =

Beach in Victoria, Australia

Marengo Beach Mounts Bay
- Beach
- Moonlight and dusk at Marengo Beach, 2024
- Interactive map of Marengo Beach
- Coordinates: 38°46′02″S 143°40′03″E
- Location: Marengo, Victoria, Australia
- Water bodies: Mounts Bay (Southern Ocean)

Dimensions
  - Length: 1.8 kilometres (1.1 mi)
- Hazard rating: 6/10 (moderately hazardous)
- Access: Great Ocean Road, Marengo Crescent

Marengo Beach (also known as Mounts Bay) is a coastal beach at Marengo, immediately south of Apollo Bay, on the Great Ocean Road in south-western Victoria, Australia. The beach faces south-east and extends from Point Bunbury in the north toward Hayley Point, also known as Cape Marengo. Its southern end is partly sheltered by offshore reef, while the northern section is more exposed to waves and rip currents. The Barham River reaches the sea at the northern end of the beach.

== History ==
The coastal barrier behind Mounts Bay developed after the sea level reached approximately its present position around 6,000 years ago. Sand accumulated along the shoreline to form the barrier on which the modern foreshore lies, separating the sea from the floodplain of the Barham River. The river subsequently cut an outlet through the barrier at the northern end of the bay. The vegetated shoreline has continued to retreat slowly, with coastal erosion identified as a potential future threat to the alignment of the Great Ocean Road.

On October 29 2017, an unidentified man aged in his 30s, drowned at the beach, despite efforts from surfers attempting to revive him.

On January 25 2021, Samoan-Australian siblings Vaisaele, Junior and Agnes Fue were rescued from a rip by two surfers.

Another fatal swimming incident occurred at Marengo Beach on 17 March, 2024, when three swimmers were swept out to sea in rough conditions. All three were recovered unconscious by Melbourne resident Brianna Hurst, but 26-year-old international student Jil Jayeshbhai Khokhara, from Gujarat, India, died following the incident.

== Geography and features ==
Marengo Beach is an exposed south-east facing embayment extending approximately 1.8 kilometres (1.1 mi) between Point Bunbury in the north and Hayley Point, or Cape Marengo, in the south. About 500 metres (1,600 ft) offshore from Hayley Point lies Little Henty Reef, which reduces wave energy reaching the southern portion of the beach.

The beach forms part of a coastal sand barrier backed by low dunes and the floodplain of the Barham River. The river crosses the barrier and enters the sea near the northern end of the beach. The Great Ocean Road follows the landward side of the shoreline, with several parking areas providing access to the beach and Hayley Point.

Wave conditions vary along the beach. At the more sheltered southern end, average waves are around 1 metre (3 ft 3 in) and a narrow attached sand bar develops in the lee of Little Henty Reef. Wave height and surf-zone width generally increase toward the north, where rip currents become more frequent and pronounced.

The southern end of the beach, particularly the area sheltered by the reef, generally provides the most protected swimming conditions. Farther north, larger waves and rip channels increase the hazards for swimmers. Surfing is concentrated around the central and northern parts of the beach, where the greater exposure produces more developed beach breaks. Recreational fishing takes place along the beach, particularly in deeper rip channels and around the mouth of the Barham River. Hayley Point also contains a broad intertidal rock platform, from which deeper water between the point and offshore reef can be reached.

== See also ==
- Peterborough Beach
- Torquay Surf Beach
- Port Campbell Beach
- Wild Dog Cove
- Great Ocean Road
- Mount's Bay (disambiguation)
