= Iluka Falls =

Waterfall in Victoria, Australia

- Location within Victoria
- Location: Cape Otway, Victoria, Australia
- Coordinates: 38°50′38″S 143°33′42″E
- Type: Plunge
- Total height: 4.21 m (13.8 ft)
- Number of drops: 2
- Watercourse: (Unnamed creek)

Iluka Falls is a waterfall located in the locality of Cape Otway, Victoria, Australia. Located on a small unnamed creek adjacent to Parker River, the waterfall is at a total height of 4.21 metres (13.8 ft), comprising 2 drops measuring 1.75 metres (5 ft 9 in) and 2.46 metres (8 ft 1 in) respectively.

== Description ==
The waterfall is characterised by a large colourful boulder that sits atop the first tier of the waterfall, with the water dropping through the gap underneath. The word "iluka" is an indigenous word, reputedly meaning "by the sea".

== See also ==
- Elliot River Falls
- Upper Elliot River Falls
- Geary River Falls
- Upper Geary River Falls
- Cape Otway Lighthouse
