= Conservation Ecology Centre Cape Otway =

Conservation Ecology Centre
- Type: Non-profit
- Industry: Ecological research; Wildlife conservation
- Founded: 2000; 26 years ago
- Founder: Lizzie Corke and Shayne Neal
- Headquarters: Cape Otway, Australia
- Area served: Otways region and beyond, Victoria, Australia
- Website: conservationecologycentre.org

The Conservation Ecology Centre in Cape Otway, Victoria, Australia, is a nationally registered non-profit ecological research and conservation organisation dedicated to protecting and understanding Australian ecosystems.

Based in the Great Ocean Road region (approximately 3.5 hours from Melbourne), alongside the Great Otway National Park, the Centre combines research with knowledge and education to offer solutions across landscapes and communities.

All projects are chosen for their potential to have a broad application and to benefit wildlife and environments locally, throughout the Australian landscape and around the world.

== History ==
The Conservation Ecology Centre in Cape Otway was founded in 2000 by Lizzie Corke and Shayne Neal. They purchased a 165-acre property to create a base for conservation work in the Otways, and a place to engage others in their efforts.

== Projects ==
- Otways Climate Resilient Forests
- The behaviour of feral predators and native animals after bushfires in Victoria's south-west
- Feral Pig Management Program in the Otways
- Cape Otway invasive predator control
- Otways Marine Ecosystem Resilience
- Murnong on Maar
- Cape Otway Ecological Baseline Study

== Social enterprise ==
The Conservation Ecology Centre established the wildlife and nature sanctuary called Wildlife Wonders in Apollo Bay, Victoria, Australia. This social enterprise supports the research and conservation efforts of the Conservation Ecology Centre, which are vital for protecting nature and wildlife. Wildlife Wonders is a Certified Social Enterprise through Social Traders.
