= Upper Elliot River Falls =

Waterfall in Victoria, Australia

- Location within Victoria
- Location: Apollo Bay, Victoria, Australia
- Coordinates: 38°47′21″S 143°36′58″E
- Type: Plunge
- Total height: 11.88 m (39.0 ft)
- Number of drops: 2
- Watercourse: Elliot River

Upper Elliot River Falls is a waterfall located in the Otway Ranges, outside of the town of Apollo Bay, Victoria, Australia. The waterfall, consisting of 2 tiers measuring 7.71 metres (25.3 ft) and 4.17 metres (13.7 ft), is at a total height of 11.88 metres (39.0 ft) and lies on the Elliot River, which flows toward the Bass Strait.

== Description and access ==
The waterfall is named after the river, which in turn was named by surveyor George Douglas Smythe. Its lower counterpart is in close proximity to the beach at the mouth of the Elliot River, but there is no walking track from the lower falls to the upper falls.

== See also ==
- Geary River Falls
- Upper Geary River Falls
