= Wildlife Wonders =

Wildlife sanctuary

Coordinates: 38.7850°S 143.6366°E

- Interactive map of Wildlife Wonders
- Location: Apollo Bay, Victoria, Australia
- Nearest city: Apollo Bay
- Area: 30 acres (12 ha)
- Established: 2021
- Operator: Conservation Ecology Centre
- Website: wildlifewonders.org.au

Wildlife Wonders is a wildlife and nature sanctuary located approximately 5 kilometres west of Apollo Bay along the Great Ocean Road in Victoria, Australia. Established as a social enterprise, it operates under the auspices of the Conservation Ecology Centre whose work on forest and fire ecology is paving the way to restore the region’s natural processes. The sanctuary has received funding from state and federal governments. Minister for Regional Development Jaala Pulford announced a $1.5 million grant to the Conservation Ecology Centre’s Wildlife Wonders project.

The Wildlife Wonders sanctuary spans approximately 30 acres and is enclosed by a predator-proof fence, providing a secure habitat for native species such as kangaroos, koalas, and emus, as well as threatened species including long-nosed potoroos and southern brown bandicoots. The environment is designed to support free-ranging wildlife within a natural bushland habitat, focussing on the region’s biodiversity and ecological significance. Revenue from Wildlife Wonders is directed toward conservation initiatives in the Otways, delivered through projects managed by the Conservation Ecology Centre.

== History ==
The conservation organisation (Conservation Ecology Centre) acquired the former farming property in 2018 and spent over two years developing a research facility and creating walking tracks for guided tours for education and conservation purposes. Brian Massey, a landscape designer known for his work on the Hobbiton set and as an art director for The Hobbit films, collaborated with conservationists Lizzie Corke OAM and Shayne Neal from the Conservation Ecology Centre on the design of this 20-hectare property near the Great Ocean Road. Wildlife Wonders opened in early 2021.
