= Upper Geary River Falls =

Waterfall in Victoria, Australia

- Location within Victoria
- Location: Cape Otway, Victoria, Australia
- Coordinates: 38°47′34″S 143°36′40″E
- Type: Plunge
- Total height: 2.67 m (8 ft 9 in)
- Number of drops: 1
- Watercourse: Geary River

Upper Geary River Falls is a small waterfall located on the Geary River, within the Otway Ranges, in the locality of Cape Otway, Victoria, Australia. It consists of a single drop, at a height of 2.67 metres (8 ft 9 in).

== Description ==
The waterfall was accidentally found by waterfall research Anthony Car while using incorrect coordinates for the believed location. The waterfall is named after the river, which in turn was named by George Douglas Smythe from his sister's (Susan) married name, after her marriage to Royal Navy captain William Henry Geary.

== See also ==
- Cape Otway Lighthouse
- Blanket Bay
- Upper Elliot River Falls
- Iluka Falls
- Mirage Falls
