= Flow FM (Australia) =

Coordinates: 34°20′45″S 138°54′40″E

- Kapunda, South Australia, Australia; Australia
- Broadcast area: Remote Commercial Radio Service Central Zone RA1
- Frequency: 99.5 MHz FM

Programming
- Language: English
- Format: Adult contemporary

Ownership
- Owner: Flow FM; (W & L Phillips Pty Ltd)

History
- First air date: January 2001

Technical information
- Class: commercial
- Repeater: various

Links
- Website: www.flowfm.com.au

Flow FM is an Adult contemporary-formatted radio station based in Kapunda, South Australia, and broadcasting to regional and remote communities of South Australia, Victoria, New South Wales and the Northern Territory. It began broadcasting as Radio Freshstream in 2001.

== Programming ==
- The Breaky Flow with Han and Damo
- Mornings with Wayne 'the Flowman' Phillips
- Afternoons with Lisa Jay
- Friday Night Footy Show with Wayne 'the Flowman' Phillips
- The Alan Jones Show (on relay from 2GB Sydney)
- Jonesy & Amanda's Afternoon Delight (on relay from WSFM Sydney)
- Take 40 Australia
- My Generation
- Ben Sorensen's REAL Country

== Frequencies ==
=== Victoria ===
- 97.9 FM Marengo (Apollo Bay)
- 90.9 FM Otway Ranges (Beech Forest)
- 106.3 FM Healesville
- 106.5 FM Donald Birchip
- 95.3 FM Hopetoun, Ouyen, Mallee Region

=== South Australia ===
- 99.5 FM Kapunda
- 100.3 FM Bordertown
- 106.1 FM Ceduna
- 106.9 FM Central Eyre Peninsula
- 99.7 FM Coober Pedy
- 97.7 FM Coorong
- 107.3 FM Kingston SE, Robe
- 90.9 FM Maitland
- 96.5 FM Pinnaroo, Lameroo
- 97.9 FM Roxby Downs
- 99.3 FM Streaky Bay
- 91.3 FM Prominent Hill
- 101.7 FM Woomera
- 97.7 FM Leigh Creek
- 107.5 FM Burra

=== New South Wales ===
- 93.9 FM Bunnaloo
- 88.7 FM Urana

=== Northern Territory ===
- 101.5 FM Jabiru
- 100.5 FM Tennant Creek
