= Geary River =

Perennial river in Victoria, Australia

Geary
- Location of the Geary River mouth in Victoria

Location
- Country: Australia
- State: Victoria
- Region: South East Coastal Plain (IBRA), The Otways
- Local government area: Colac Otway Shire

Physical characteristics
- Source: Otway Ranges
  - location: near Parker Spur
  - coordinates: 38°46′9″S 143°35′20″E
  - elevation: 356 m (1,168 ft)
- Mouth: Bass Strait
  - location: south of Marengo
  - coordinates: 38°47′44″S 143°36′55″E
  - elevation: 0 m (0 ft)
- Length: 5 km (3.1 mi)

Basin features
- River system: Corangamite catchment
- National park: Port Campbell National Park

The Geary River is a perennial river of the Corangamite catchment, in the Otways region of the Australian state of Victoria.

== Location and features ==
The Geary River rises in the Otway Ranges in southwest Victoria, near Parkers Spur, and flows generally east by south through the Port Campbell National Park before reaching its river mouth and emptying into Bass Strait, northeast of Cape Otway and south of the town of Marengo. From its highest point, the river descends 256 metres (840 ft) over its 5-kilometre (3.1 mi) course.

== See also ==
- List of rivers of Australia § Victoria
- Geary River Falls
- Upper Geary River Falls
