= Apollo Bay Beach =

Beach in Apollo Bay, Victoria, Australia

- Beach
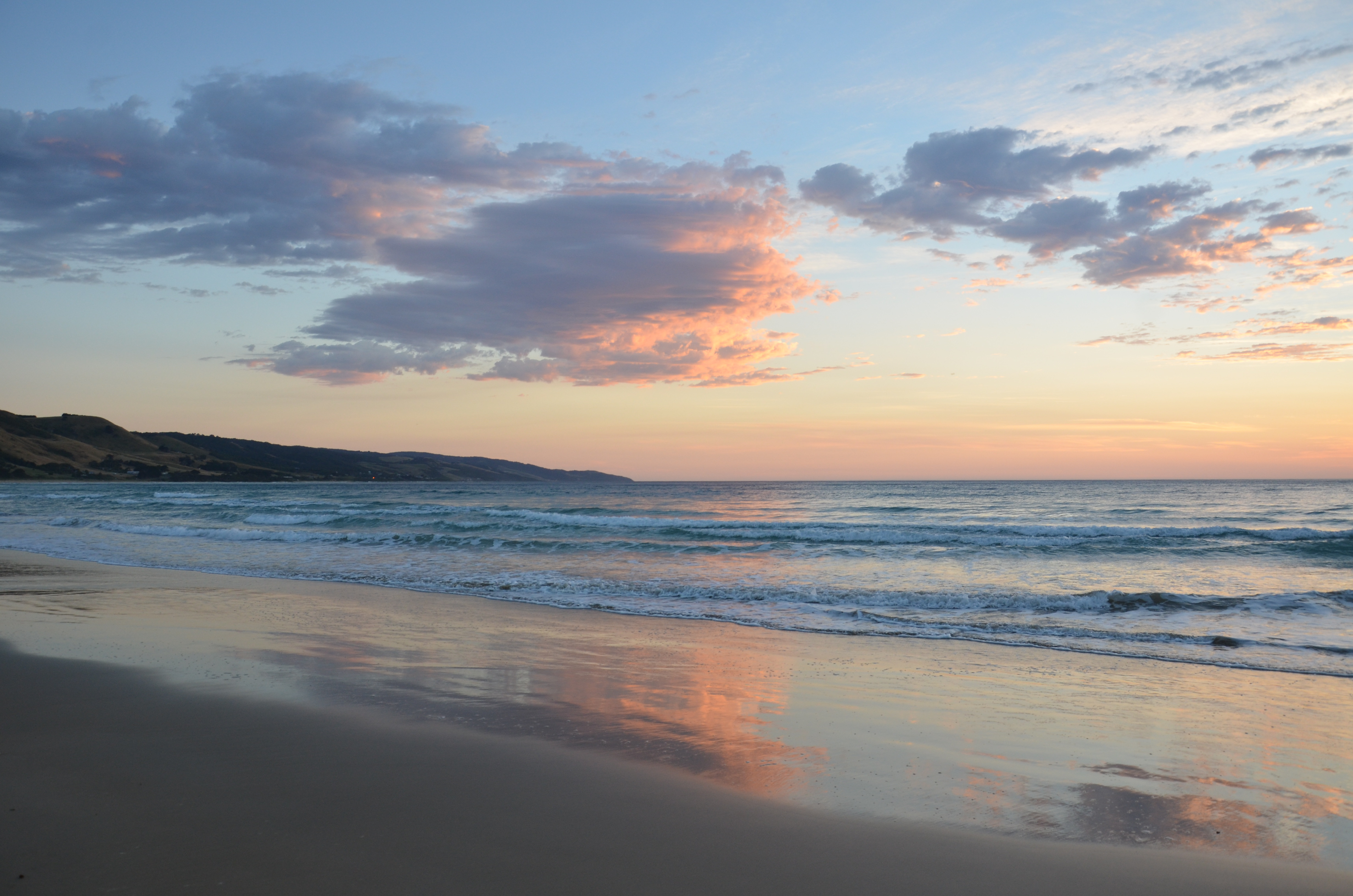
- Apollo Bay Beach
- Interactive map of Apollo Bay Beach
- Coordinates: 38°45′06″S 143°40′13″E
- Location: Apollo Bay, Victoria, Australia
- Water bodies: Apollo Bay, Bass Strait

Dimensions
  - Length: 3 kilometres (1.9 mi)
- Patrolled by: SLSA
- Hazard rating: 5/10 (moderately hazardous)
- Access: Collingwood Street (Great Ocean Road)

Apollo Bay Beach is the principal beach of Apollo Bay, Victoria, Australia, extending for approximately 3 kilometres along the town's eastern shoreline. Located on the Great Ocean Road, it is one of the region's most popular beaches, offering swimming, surfing, fishing and boating. The beach is sheltered by Point Bunbury and the Apollo Bay Boat Harbour, creating generally calmer conditions at its southern end, where lifesaving patrols by the Apollo Bay Surf Life Saving Club operate during the summer months and other peak periods.

== History ==
The waters of Apollo Bay were used seasonally by sealers and whalers before permanent European settlement was established in the area. By 1849, the settlement developed as the centre of a local timber industry, and timber cut in the surrounding forests was hauled to the beach before being floated through the surf to waiting vessels bound for Geelong. This process was frequently hazardous, with onshore winds contributing to numerous accidents along the shoreline.

The bay derives its name from the schooner Apollo, commanded by Captain Loutit, who sheltered there from a south-westerly gale while sailing to Portland in 1845. Loutit subsequently named the bay after his vessel, hence giving rise to the modern township name.

On 29 July 1854, the 140-ton brigantine Anna became the first recorded shipwreck in Apollo Bay after dragging its anchors ashore during a gale.

Construction of the Apollo Bay Boat Harbour during the 1950s altered the southern end of the beach by trapping sand against the harbour wall, causing the shoreline to advance seaward. While the harbour improved protection for vessels, sediment accumulation has required periodic dredging to maintain navigable depths.

The beach made 4th on Tourism Australia's annual Best Australian Beaches list for 2023, the only Victorian beach in the top 10 that year.

== Description ==
Apollo Bay Beach faces east and is protected from prevailing westerly swells by Point Bunbury and the harbour breakwaters. This shelter creates relatively calm conditions at the southern end of the beach, where waves generally average around one metre and a broad, shallow sandbar forms with few rip currents. Further north, the beach becomes progressively more exposed, with larger waves and stronger rips developing along the open coastline.

The beach is regarded as one of the safer ocean beaches along the Great Ocean Road, particularly near the Apollo Bay Surf Life Saving Club, which has patrolled the southern end since its establishment in 1952. Visitors are advised to swim between the flags, as conditions become more hazardous further north where rip currents are more persistent.

The sheltered waters near Point Bunbury are popular for swimming, beginner surfing, boating, beach games and families, while the more exposed northern sections attract surfers and beach fishers. Surf schools also operate from the southern end of the beach, taking advantage of the gentler wave conditions created by the harbour. During larger swells, a right-hand surf break can also form along the western harbour wall.

== See also ==
- Marengo Beach
- Thirteenth Beach
- Torquay Surf Beach
- Torquay Front Beach
- Jan Juc Beach
- Lorne Beach
- Great Ocean Road
