= Parker River Falls =

Waterfall in Victoria, Australia

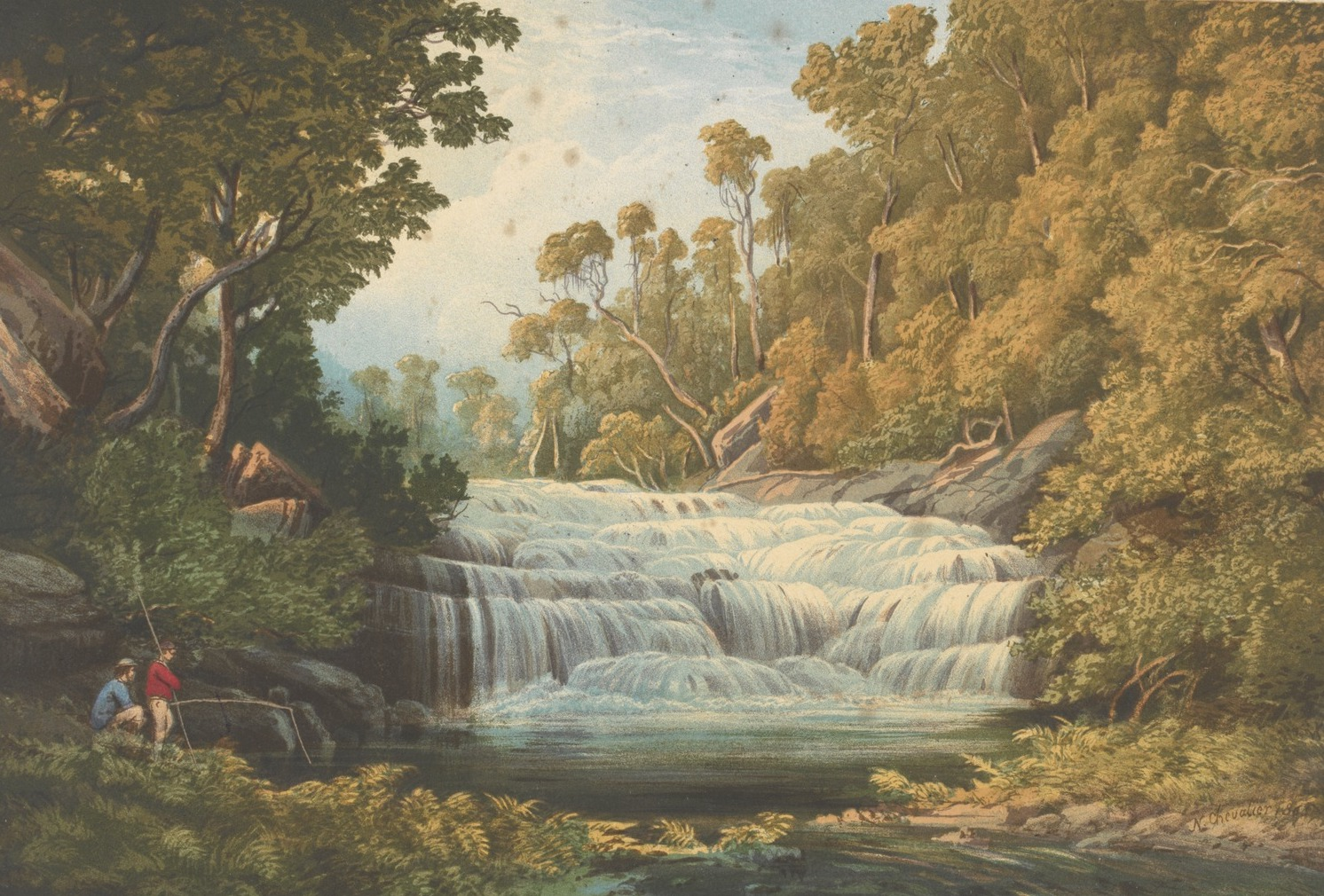
- Parker's River Waterfall, Cape Otway (painting by Nicholas Chevalier, 1865)

- Location within Victoria
- Location: Cape Otway, Victoria, Australia
- Coordinates: 38°50′38″S 143°33′31″E
- Type: Plunge
- Total height: 3.16 m (10.4 ft)
- Number of drops: 1
- Watercourse: Parker River

Parker River Falls is a waterfall within the locality of Cape Otway, Victoria, Australia. Situated on the Parker River, the waterfall consists of a single tier at a height of 3.16 metres (10.4 ft).

== Description and access ==
The waterfall is named after the creek, which in turn was named by surveyor George Douglas Smythe after his fiancée at the time, Amelia Parker.

The waterfall was subject to a painting by artist Nicholas Chevalier in 1865, entitled "Parker's River Waterfall, Cape Otway". It can be accessed by following the river upstream from the rivermouth, where the Great Ocean Walk crosses.

== See also ==
- Allambee Beek Falls
- Galliebarinda Falls
- Carisbrook Falls
- Swallow Cave Falls
- Erskine Falls
- Sheoak Falls
- Lower Kalimna Falls
