= Stan Harrison (disambiguation) =

Stan Harrison (born 1953) is an American saxophonist.

Stan or Stanley Harrison may also refer to:

- Stan Harrison (footballer, born 1940) (1940–2000), Australian rules footballer for Geelong
- Stan Harrison (footballer, born 1944), Australian rules footballer for Carlton
