= Elliott River (Victoria) =

Perennial river in Victoria, Australia

Elliott
- Location of the Elliott River mouth in Victoria

Location
- Country: Australia
- State: Victoria
- Region: South East Coastal Plain (IBRA), The Otways
- Local government area: Colac Otway Shire

Physical characteristics
- Source: Otway Ranges
  - location: near the locale of Paradise
  - coordinates: 38°45′46″S 143°35′27″E
  - elevation: 305 m (1,001 ft)
- Mouth: Bass Strait
  - location: south of Marengo
  - coordinates: 38°47′36″S 143°37′10″E
  - elevation: 0 m (0 ft)
- Length: 8 km (5.0 mi)

Basin features
- River system: Corangamite catchment
- National park: Port Campbell National Park

The Elliott River (also spelt Elliot River) is a perennial river of the Corangamite catchment, in the Otways region of the Australian state of Victoria.

== Location and features ==
The Elliott Rivers rises in the Otway Ranges in southwest Victoria, near the locality of Paradise and flows generally east by south through the Port Campbell National Park before reaching its river mouth and emptying into Bass Strait, northeast of Cape Otway and south of the town of Marengo. From its highest point, the river descends 305 metres (1,001 ft) over its 7-kilometre (4.3 mi) course.

== See also ==
- List of rivers of Australia § Victoria
- Elliot River Falls
- Upper Elliot River Falls
