= Barham River =

Perennial river in Victoria, Australia

Barham Burrum Burrum, Barham River West Branch, Barham River East Branch
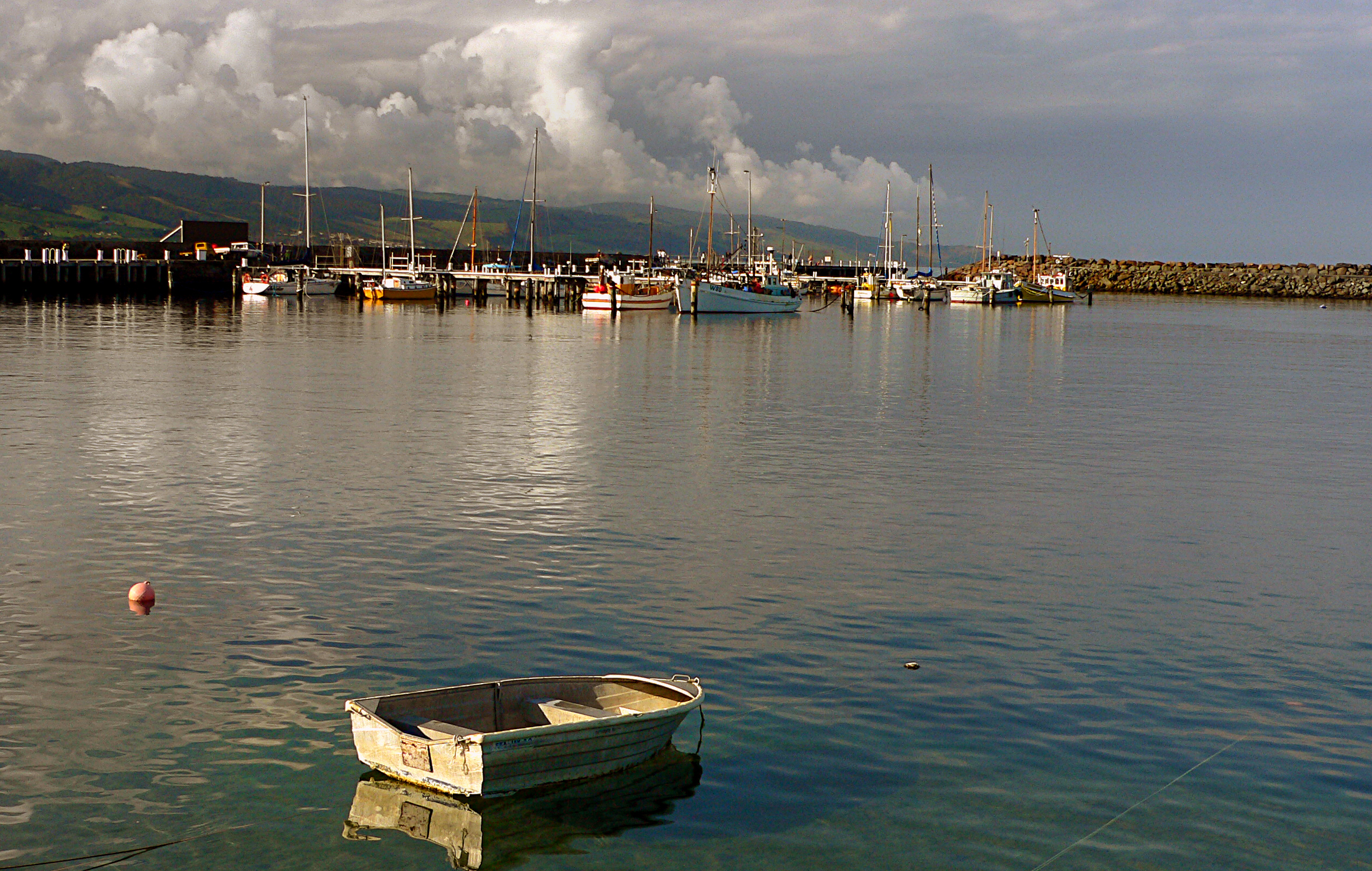
- Apollo Bay is a coastal town in southwestern Victoria, Australia. It is situated on the eastern side of Cape Otway, along the edge of the Barham River and on the Great Ocean Road, in the Colac Otway Shire.

- Location of the Barham River mouth in Victoria
- Etymology: Aboriginal: Barrum or Burrum, meaning "river" or "junction of two rivers"
- Native name: Barrum-barrum (Gunditjmara)

Location
- Country: Australia
- State: Victoria
- Region: South East Coastal Plain (IBRA), The Otways
- Local government area: Colac Otway Shire

Physical characteristics
- Source: Otway Ranges
  - location: near Marriner Ridge
  - coordinates: 38°41′25″S 143°35′55″E
  - elevation: 481 m (1,578 ft)
- Source confluence: East and West Branches of the Barham River
  - location: east of Paradise
  - coordinates: 38°45′53″S 143°38′2″E
  - elevation: 65 m (213 ft)
- Mouth: Bass Strait
  - location: north of Cape Otway
  - coordinates: 38°45′59″S 143°40′10″E
  - elevation: 0 m (0 ft)
- Length: 16 km (9.9 mi)

Basin features
- River system: Corangamite catchment
- National park: Great Otway National Park

The Barham River is a perennial river of the Corangamite catchment, in the Otways region of the Australian state of Victoria.

== Location and features ==
The Barham River rises as the West Branch of the river in the Otway Ranges near Marriner Ridge and flows generally south then east before reaching its confluence with the East Branch of the river near the locality of Paradise. From there, it flows directly east to its mouth at the town of Apollo Bay and empties into Bass Strait, north of Cape Otway. From its highest point, the river descends 481 metres (1,578 ft) over its 16-kilometre (9.9 mi) course.

== Etymology ==
The river's name was first recorded by European surveyor George Smythe, and is derived from the Aboriginal word barrum or burrum, meaning "river", "junction of two rivers", or a "stony river bed".

== See also ==
- List of rivers of Australia § Victoria
