= Marriners Falls =

Waterfall in Victoria, Australia

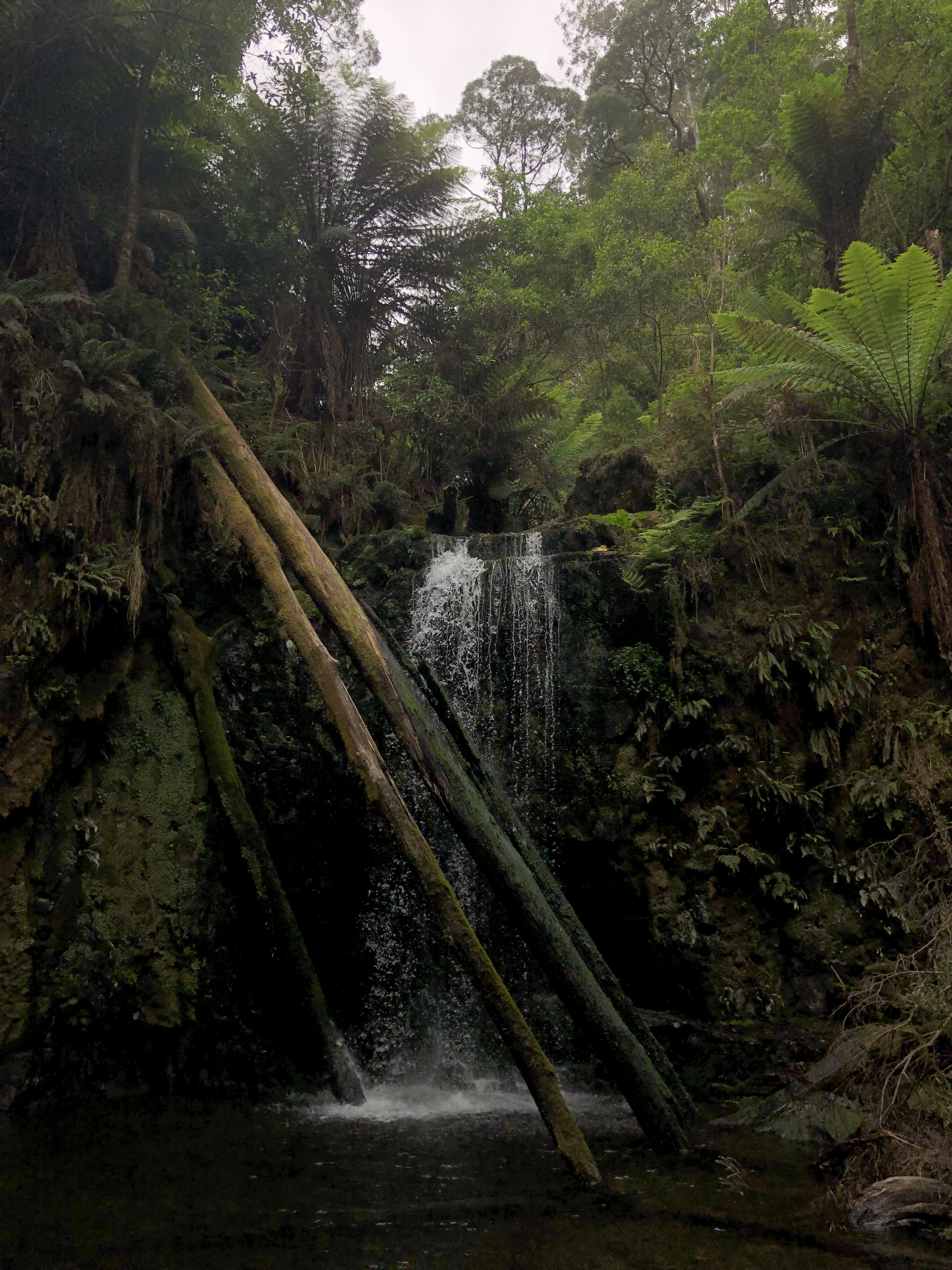
- Marriners Falls

- Location within Victoria
- Location: Apollo Bay, Victoria, Australia
- Coordinates: 38°42′05″S 143°38′30″E
- Type: Plunge
- Total height: 7.17 m (23.5 ft)
- Number of drops: 1
- Watercourse: Falls Creek

Marriners Falls is a waterfall located within the Otway Ranges, outside of the town of Apollo Bay, Victoria, Australia. The waterfall consists of a singular plunge, at a height of 7.17 metres (23.5 ft). The track to the waterfall has been closed since 2011, as Parks Victoria deemed it at risk of falling trees. Since the closure, members of the local community, with the support of the Colac Otway Shire, have attempted to approach the Victorian Government to fund a new track to the waterfall, with some defying the closure.

== History ==
The falls are most likely named after Edward Marriner. Edward was born on 28 May 1861 at Portarlington, before moving to Apollo Bay (then known as 'Krambruk') in the early 1900s, to a home called "The Springs", and was a fisherman by trade. He died aged 85, on 20 January 1947.

In 2005, a group of five visitors walked to the top of the waterfall, and could not get down, resulting in them being recovered by rescue crews.

In 2008, a visitor was seriously injured by a falling tree.

In 2011, Parks Victoria, the managing authority of the area around the waterfall, deemed that the risk of falling trees was unacceptable after a report into the shallowness of tree roots and thin soil coverage alongside the track, and closed the track to the waterfall, and remains closed to the present day.

In 2014, a visitor broke their ankle while walking to the waterfall. Later that year, Brett and Caterina Morrison were married at the waterfall. Also that year, the Department of Environment, Land, Water and Planning conducted another report, finding the risk of tree fall enduring.

Community lobbying led to Parks Victoria conducting a third report into the track safety, with Parks Victoria ultimately maintaining the closure, due to the continuing risk of falling trees.

In 2018, Colac Otway Shire, after a reignition of lobbying from members of the community to reopen the falls, expressed their support for reopening the track to the waterfall, and attempted to contact the Department of Environment, Land, Water and Planning.

== See also ==
- Erskine Falls
- Great Ocean Road
- Hopetoun Falls
- List of waterfalls
- List of waterfalls in Australia
- Sabine Falls
- Triplet Falls
- Twelve Apostles
