= MS City of Rayville =

United States Naval vessel

Coordinates: 38°51′S 143°39′E

History
- Name: City of Rayville
- Namesake: either Rayville, Louisiana, or Rayville, Missouri, or both
- Port of registry: (United States) Tampa
- Builder: Oscar Daniels Company; Tampa, Florida
- Yard number: 8
- Launched: April 1920
- Completed: January 1921
- Fate: Sunk by naval mine, 8 November 1940, off Cape Otway, Australia.

General characteristics
- Type: Design 1027 ship
- Tonnage: 5,910 GRT
- Length: 122.5 m (401 ft 11 in)
- Beam: 16.5 m (54 ft 2 in)
- Propulsion: 1 × triple-expansion steam engine (as built); 1 × 6-cylinder Busch-Sulzer diesel engine (by 1930)
- Speed: 11 knots (20 km/h)
- Crew: 38

SS City of Rayville, also referred to as the MV and/or MS City of Rayville was a 5883-ton American steamship. She was built in 1920 by Oscar Daniels & Co. of Tampa, Florida. It was the first American vessel sunk by enemy action in World War II.

== Sinking ==
The SS City of Rayville was the first American vessel sunk during World War II, sunk by a German mine off the coast of southern Australia.

Over three nights in November 1940, the German minelaying ship Passat, a captured Norwegian tanker, had strategically planted 110 sea mines in Bass Strait, a busy trade route between Tasmania and Victoria. This field of mines had already claimed the British steamer SS Cambridge (1916) less than 24 hours previously off Wilsons Promontory.

On 8 November 1940, City of Rayville sailed into the Bass Strait with a cargo of 1,500 tons (37,520 bars) of Port Pirie lead. At 7:47 pm the ship hit one of the mines. The explosion was powerful enough to rip out the foremast, as shrapnel and ingots of lead rained down on the ship's decks.

The 38 crew members were able to safely abandon the vessel in lifeboats, although one mariner (James Bryan of Norfolk, Virginia) re-entered the vessel to find his personal items and subsequently drowned. The vessel sank, bow first, in 35 minutes. A period news account listed the victim as Third Engineer Mac B. Bryan, of Randleman, North Carolina.

The lightkeeper stationed at Cape Otway Lightstation witnessed the sinking, and three boats from Apollo Bay went in search of survivors. The ship's lifeboats were found, and successfully towed back to Apollo Bay, arriving at dawn, 9 November 1940.

This preceded the attack on Pearl Harbor, in December 1941, by more than a year, and resulted in the death of the first US seaman in World War II.

== Wreck ==
The site of the wreck is approximately 14 kilometers (8.7 mi) south of Cape Otway, with the vessel at a depth of 70 meters (230 ft). The wreck's general location had been known since 2002, but it was finally pinpointed using advanced sonar equipment.

== Commemoration ==
In memory of this event, a group of villas in the little village of Apollo Bay (15 kilometers (9.3 mi) from Cape Otway), is named Rayville Boat Houses. Moreover, the villas themselves are baptized according to the names of the local fishermen who rescued the victims: Lincoln Allen, Les Barrand, Harry Blyth, Bill Burwood, Roy Fisk, Jock Muir, Bill Ovens, James Slater and Len Stephens. These villas have been built by Ross Stephens, one rescuer's father.
