= Stan Harrison (footballer, born 1940) =

Australian rules footballer

Personal information
- Full name: Stanley Bruce Harrison
- Born: 29 March 1940; South Melbourne, Victoria
- Died: 13 November 2000 (aged 60); Apollo Bay, Victoria
- Height: 180 cm (5 ft 11 in)
- Weight: 73 kg (161 lb)

Playing career^{1}
Years	Club	Games (Goals)
1959–60, 1962	Geelong	15 (4)
- ^{1} Playing statistics correct to the end of 1962.

Stanley Bruce Harrison (29 March 1940 – 13 November 2000) was an Australian rules footballer who played with Geelong in the Victorian Football League (VFL).
