= Mount's Bay (disambiguation) =

Mount's Bay is a bay on the English Channel coast of Cornwall, United Kingdom.

Mount's Bay or Mounts Bay may also refer to:

- Mounts Bay RFC, a defunct rugby club formerly based in Penzance
- Mounts Bay Road, Perth, Western Australia
- Mounts Bay, in the Swan River Estuary, Perth
- HMS Mounts Bay (K627), a Royal Navy ship
- RFA Mounts Bay (L3008), a Royal Fleet auxiliary ship
