= Gadubanud =

Aboriginal Australian group from the Cape Otway area in Victoria

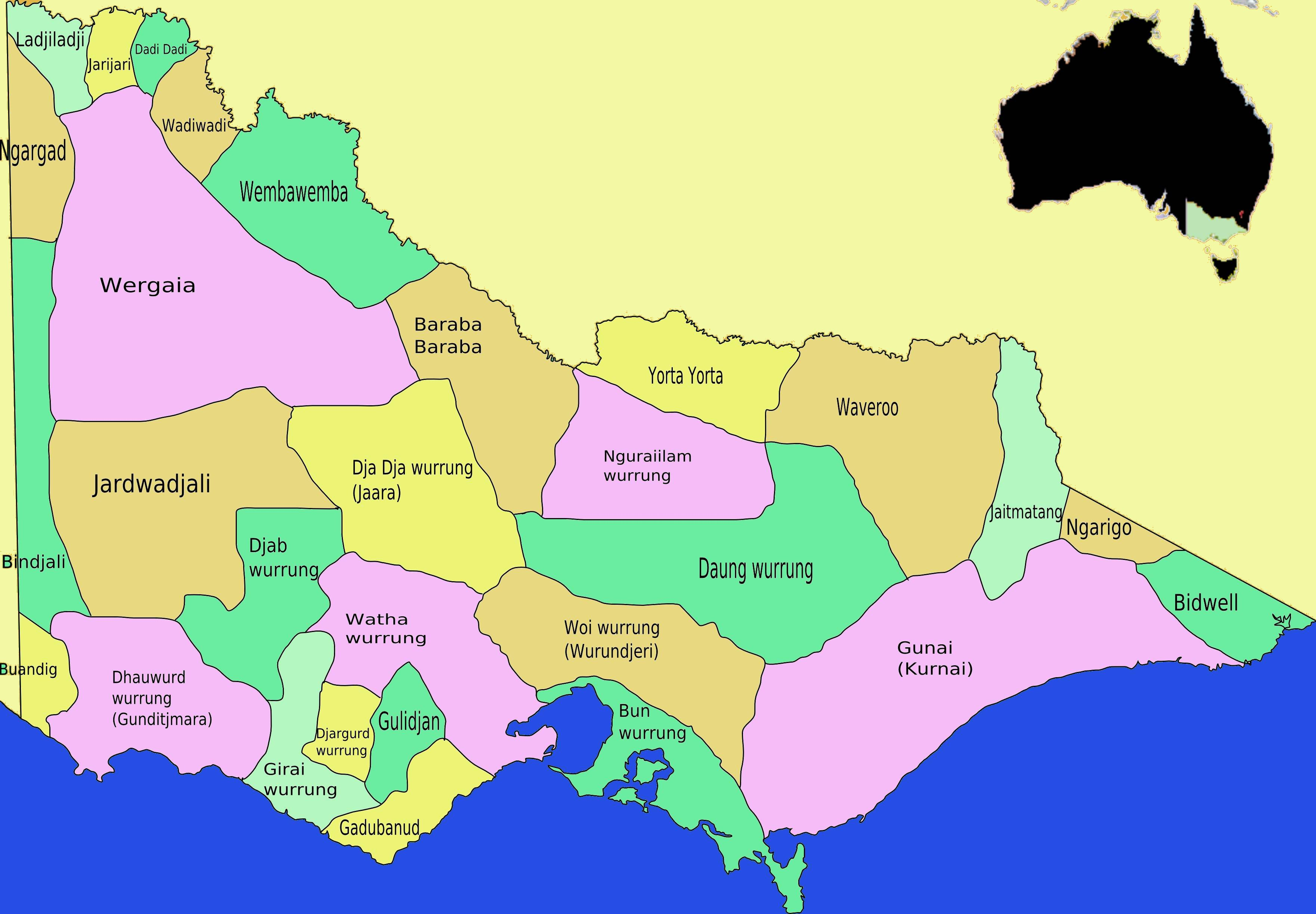
Victorian Aboriginal language territories

The Gadubanud (Katubanut), also known as the Pallidurgbarran, Yarro waetch, King Parrot people or Cape Otway tribe (Tindale), are an Aboriginal Australian people of the state of Victoria. Their territory encompasses the rainforest plateau and rugged coastline of Cape Otway. Their numbers declined rapidly following the onset of European colonisation, and little is known of them. However, some may have found refuge at the Wesleyan mission station at Birregurra, and later the Framlingham mission station, and some people still trace their descent from them.

Today, by the principle of succession, the Gunditjmara are considered the traditional custodians of Gadubanud lands.

== Name ==
"Gadubanud/Katubanut" appears to have meant "King Parrot language", and is considered to have been an exonym applied to the people by tribes to their west, perhaps with a pejorative colouring.

== Language ==
Almost no linguistic material has been recorded for the Gadubanud language. A connection with the Gulidjan to their north is suggested in the literature. Their tongue was first identified as signifying "king parrot language" by James Dawson in 1881.

== Country ==
The Katubanut inhabited the rainforest plateau and rugged coastline of the Cape Otway peninsula, and the centre of their land is thought to have probably been at Apollo Bay. The extent of their territory is not known. Their habitat consisted of rainforests ("jarowaitj"), composed of giant eucalypts and southern beeches, which were scarce in food resources and flush with dingo packs, and adjacent sclerophyll woodlands, as well as the wetlands of the Barwon River headwaters, and abundant river estuaries on the coast, providing, according to the nature of the seasons, ecosystems rich in food sources. The area they dwelt in has been shown by John Mulvaney's archaeological work, and more recent studies in the Aire river area, to have been occupied for several centuries, one site going back 1,000 years.

== History of contact ==
Much like the Bidawal lands of far eastern Gippsland, early European settlers thought the Otway peninsula was an impenetrable haven for an indeterminate number of Aboriginal people, who used its impenetrable and cold rainforest as a refuge, while venturing out at times to filch food and blankets from outstations. In doing so, however, they were not known for resorting to "savage violence".

According to native oral history, the Gadubanud were wiped out in a war when neighbouring tribes set fire to their forests, causing them to expire through suffocation. They appear to have been regarded as "wild blacks" by their neighbours, the Wathaurong to the northeast and the Girai wurrung on their west. However, Norman Tindale dates their extinction to some years after the beginnings of European colonisation of the area.

From notes made by the chief Protector of Aborigines, George Robinson, who came across three members of the tribe at the mouth of the Hopkins River in 1842, some 50 miles (80 km) beyond their traditional lands, in Djagurd territory, it has been surmised that they had some linguistic affiliation with this group. That year they appear to have robbed an outstation for food and blankets In March 1846, on his third attempt to penetrate the Otway area, the district superintendent for Port Philip Bay, Charles La Trobe, encountered seven Gadubanud men and women in the Aire Valley. On the Gellibrand River a month later, Henry Allan found one of their camps, full of implements, (Note: Aldo Massola speculated that these tools had been made at the 'grinding rocks' on Lardner's Creek nearby, where basalt blanks were manufactured for trading as axe heads.) and in mid-winter of the same year, the surveyor George D Smythe came across eight: a man, four women and three boys. The group assisted Smythe by pointing out the track leading to Gunna-waar Creek (Airedale), and, in gratitude, Smythe issued them with a note instructing his coxswain to provide them with flour at Blanket Bay. Four days later, he heard that one member of his party, the seaman James Conroy, had been killed by a local native, though the circumstances leading to his death are unknown.

=== Blanket Bay massacre ===
Smythe, whose deeds of violence were to assume notorious proportions among settlers, decided to retaliate and, on returning to Melbourne, organized an expedition to return to the Otways, picking up several Wathaurong in Geelong in August 1846. According to Bruce Pascoe, he had been given a mandate by Latrobe simply to arrest the suspected culprit, Meenee Meenee, a Gadubanud warrior, the only one whose name is known, with a reputation for vigorously defending territory from intruders. The party, which included several Wathaurung people, came across seven Gadubanud at the mouth of the Aire River (whose estuary was known as Gunuwarra (swan) in the Gadubanud language) near Glenaire and murdered them. A report of the massacre was published in The Argus of 1 September 1846. From this time, nothing more is reported of the Gadubanud in colonial records, apart from a couple of newspaper articles that recalled the incident with some contradictory details.

One such story is by Aldo Massola who detailed the following account:

'In 1848 one of two survivors, a woman who then lived in Warrnambool, told the story: One of the white men had interfered with a lubra, and her husband had killed the aggressor. The Black Police had come shortly after and had shot down indiscriminately the whole of her group, about twenty men, women and children. She and another lubra were only slightly wounded, and hid themselves in the scrub until the attackers left the scene of the massacre. As far as she knew they were the only survivors.' (Note: According to the historian of genocide Ben Kiernan, all but one member of the Kolakgnat/Gulidjan tribe were massacred by a search party in 1846. This appears to be an error for the Gadubanud.)

According to an article in The Age (8 January 1887), Smythe attacked when the group was asleep, and managed to kill all of them, except for one young woman who had sought refuge behind a tree. She was, in this version, the only survivor, and was taken away, being later adopted into the Woi wurrung tribe.

Notwithstanding distortions in these reports, which fuse apparently distinct actions, it would appear that a second attack took place near the Aire River in the following year, 1847, when a detachment of Native Police Corps, led by Foster Fyans, slaughtered another group, while kidnapping two surviving children, a girl and a boy. The latter was later killed on a squatter's station by one of the "friendly natives" who had helped the raiding party, to prevent him from revenging the deaths on his maturity.

In 1848, a report in the Geelong Advertiser, commenting on a tribal fight that took place near Port Fairy, describing one of the two Indigenous men killed as "a man who belonged to the Cape Otway tribe, the last of his race".

By that time, the Otways were open to European settlement. William Roadknight, who had formerly mustered a posse to help Smythe in hunting the Gadubanud, cut a track through the valley of Wild Dog Creek and set up the first cattle station in the Otway peninsula. The destruction of the Gadubanud, who had practised fire-stick farming to clear trails through the forests and bushland, restored the Otways to a state of wild regrowth that made travelling arduous, until the great January 1851 bushfire ravaged much of the forest.

== Social structure, economy and customs ==
George Robinson states that the Katubanut were composed of at least four clans. Ian Clark has speculated that they might have had some links to the Gulidjan. Niewójt states that the links to the latter were both linguistic and familial, from intermarriage, and is skeptical of the low population estimates that would follow from the 26 individuals mentioned in the ethnographic records for the 1840s, given the rich wetland and coastal food resources such as shellfish and abalone available to a people living along and inland from the 100 kilometres (62 mi) of coastland within their territorial boundaries.

Before European settlement, five separate clans existed, listed by Clark as follows:

No	Clan name	Approximate location
1	Bangura gundidj	Cape Otway
2	Guringid gundidj	Cape Otway
3	Ngalla gundidj	Cape Otway
4	Ngarowurd gundidj	North of Moonlight head.
5	Yan Yan Gurt	East head of the Barwon river (Note: This clan name was added in 1853 to the four noted by Robinson, and located them at the 'East head of the Barwon River, 12 miles south-east of Birregurra, near the base of the Otway Ranges.')

One of the Otway clans was associated with a place called Bangurer.

== Subsistence economy ==
As semi-nomads, the Gadubanud roved from the inland rainforest plateau through wetlands to the coast and its estuaries, and their diet would have varied according to the seasons. It consisted of varieties of protein-rich fish, eels, waterfowl and birds. The lacustrine and wetland zones at Gerangamete, Irrewillipe and Chapple Vale afforded reliable food resources. Nutriment was readily available by harvesting the over 200 species of local starchy tubers, such as water-ribbons (Triglochin procera) and the club-rush (Scirpus maritimus), together with tall spike rush (Eleocharis sphacelata) rhizomes. Inland, they could rely on a plethora of carbohydrate food from yam daisies (or murnong yams), which were cultivated using frequent burn-offs to clear patches of forest. The forests also yielded bracken ferns whose pith is more nutritious than potatoes. Protein-rich food was secured by culling native bush rats, indigenous mice, possums, snakes, lizards, frogs, birds and their eggs, eastern grey kangaroos, red-necked wallabies, brushtail possums, sugar gliders and fat-tailed dunnarts.

Throughout the Otways region, some 276 Aboriginal archaeological sites had been identified by 1998, 73 in the Aire River valley alone. A site at Seal Point, dating back 1,500 years, some 400 metres long, 100 metres wide and with a depth of ca.1.5 metres, has been described by Harry Lourandos as "the most complex and bountiful of all southwestern Victorian middens". Archaeological examinations of Aire River middens have uncovered both intertidal mollusc and freshwater mussel remains, together with parrot-fish residues and snails. At Seal Point, archaeologists have disinterred what looks like a warm weather camp, used from spring to early summer, including pit huts, whose remains attest to a diet based on two species of marine animals, the elephant and brown fur seals, and possums, wrasse and bracken ferns, as well as an industrial production of stone tools.

The local Lorne Historical Society states that the Gadubanud people traded spear wood for Mount William green stone mined by the Wurundjeri. (Note: Mount William green stone was highly prized and traded throughout the region of Victoria but according to Isabel McBride it is rare or absent in regions like the Otways.)

Niewójt suggests that the account, in the reminiscences of William Buckley, of an encounter with a tribe numbering about 80 people, for trading purposes, that took place at Bermongo on the Barwon River, was probably with the Yan Yan Gurt clan, perhaps exchanging the prized tuupuurn eel for baskets of tubers.

== Report of cannibalism ==
The Gadubanud were considered mainmait (wild/of alien speech) by neighbouring tribes such as the Wathaurong and Girai Wurring. (Note: That term, variants of which are mainmeet/meymet was not linked exclusively to the Gadubanud. Several Victorian tribes used it of their neighbours, and it bore, according to context, a range of meanings from 'no good' and 'foreign' to 'regarded as wild men.')

There is a lurid account in the reminiscences of William Buckley concerning the practice of cannibalism imputed to the tribe. Buckley was an escaped English convict who spent over three decades among Aboriginal Peoples, chiefly the Wathaurong of the area around Geelong. In touching on the topic he related that:

'In my wanderings about, I met with the Pallidurgbarrans, a tribe notorious for their cannibal practices; not only eating human flesh greedily after a fight, but on all occasions when it was possible. They appeared to be the nearest approach to the brute creation of any I had ever seen or heard of; and, in consequence, they were very much dreaded. Their colour was light copper, their bodies having tremendously large and protrubing [sic] bellies. Huts, or artificial places for shelter, were unknown to them it being their custom to lay about in the scrub, anyhow and anywhere. The women appeared to be most unnaturally ferocious-children being their most valued sacrifice. Their brutality at length became so harassing, and their assaults so frequent, that it was resolved to set fire to the bush where they had sheltered themselves, and so annihilate them, one and all, by suffocation. This, in part, succeeded, for I saw no more of them in my time. The belief is, that the last of the race was turned into a stone, or rock, at a place where a figure was found resembling a man, and exceedingly well executed; probably the figure-head of some unfortunate ship'.

The charge that Australian natives practised cannibalism in the usual acceptance of the word — consuming human flesh for nutriment or to strike terror into one's enemies — is now broadly dismissed as a misinterpretation of a custom restricted to funerary rites.

Tim Flannery, in editing Buckley's account, commented:

When reading about the Bunyip and Pallidurgbarrans, we need to remember that Buckley was a rural Cheshireman who doubtless believed implicitly in the faeries and hobgoblins of his homeland. Likewise, the Aboriginal people who were educating Buckley about their environment made no clear division between myth and material reality ... There is not the slightest impression that Buckley is reporting anything but what he sensed was true, yet for the modern reader there is equally little doubt that bunyips and Pallidurgbarrans are mythical beings.

== Alternative names ==
- Katubanut
- Pallidurgbarran
- Yarro waetch. This is explained by Norman Tindale as an 'ecological term of the form jarowaitj' employed by Aboriginal Peoples to their west to describe the cold rain forests of Cape Otway, which constituted the Katubanut's habitat.

== Sources ==
- Barwick, Diane E. (1984). "Mapping the past: an atlas of Victorian clans 1835-1904" (PDF). Aboriginal History. 8: 100–131.
- Birdsell, Joseph Benjamin (1993). Microevolutionary patterns in Aboriginal Australia: a gradient analysis of clines. Oxford University Press. ISBN 978-0-195-06361-5.
- Blainey, Geoffrey (1976). Triumph of the Nomads: History of Ancient Australia. Macmillan Publishers. ISBN 978-1-349-02423-0.
- Clark, Ian D. (1995). Scars in the Landscape: a register of massacre sites in western Victoria, 1803–1859 (PDF). AIATSIS. pp. 169–175. ISBN 0-85575-281-5.
- Dawson, James (1881). Australian Aborigines: The Languages and Customs of Several Tribes of Aborigines in the Western District of Victoria, Australia (PDF). Melbourne: George Robertson.
- Donovan, Paul Michael F; Clark, Ian D.; Cahir, Fred (December 2016). "'The remarkable disappearance of messrs Gellibrand and Hesse'. What really happened in 1837?: A Re-examination of the historical evidence". Victorian Historical Journal. 87 (2): 278–297.
- Edwards, William Howell (2004). An Introduction to Aboriginal Societies. Cengage Learning Australia. ISBN 978-1-876-63389-9.
- Flannery, Tim (2002). "Introduction". The Life and Adventures of William Buckley. Text Publishing. pp. ixff. ISBN 978-1-877-00820-7.
- Hebb, Isaac (1970) [First published 1888]. History of Colac and District. Hawthorn Press.
- Kiernan, Ben (2007). Blood and Soil: A World History of Genocide and Extermination from Sparta to Darfur. Yale University Press. p. 302. ISBN 978-0-300-10098-3.
- Lourandos, Harry (1983). "Intensification: A Late Pleistocene-Holocene Archaeological Sequence from Southwestern Victoria". Archaeology in Oceania. 18 (2): 81–94. doi:10.1002/arco.1983.18.2.81. JSTOR 40386632.
- Massola, Aldo (1969). Journey to Aboriginal Victoria. Rigby.
- Maynard, John; Haskins, Victoria Katharine (2016). Living with the Locals: Early Europeans' Experience of Indigenous Life. National Library of Australia. ISBN 978-0-642-27895-1.
- McBride, Isabel (1986). "Artifacts, language and social interaction: a case study from south eastern Australia". In Bailey, G. N.; Callow, P. (eds.). Stone Age Prehistory: Studies in Memory of Charles McBurney. Cambridge University Press. pp. 77–94. ISBN 978-0-521-25773-2.
- Morgan, John (1852). The Life and Adventures of William Buckley: Thirty-two Years a Wanderer among the Aborigines of the then unexplored country round Port Phillip, now the Province of Victoria (PDF). Hobart: Archibald Macdougall.
- Niewójt, Lawrence (2009). "Gadubanud society in the Otway Ranges, Victoria: an environmental history". Aboriginal History. 33: 175–199. JSTOR 24046828.
- "The Otway Aboriginal Matriarch – Aunty Edna Arnold". Otway Life Magazine. 19 March 2014.
- Pascoe, Bruce (2007). Convincing Ground: Learning to Fall in Love with Your Country. Aboriginal Studies Press. ISBN 978-0-855-75549-2.
- "The Story of Lorne". Lorne Historical Society.
- Stuart, Iain-Malcolm F. (1981). "Ethnohistory in the Otway Ranges". Artefact (6): 79–88.
- Tindale, Norman Barnett (1974). "Katubanut (VIC)". Aboriginal Tribes of Australia: Their Terrain, Environmental Controls, Distribution, Limits, and Proper Names. Australian National University Press. ISBN 978-0-708-10741-6. Archived from the original on 6 March 2017.
