= Cape Otway Lighthouse =

Lighthouse in Victoria, Australia

Cape Otway Lightstation
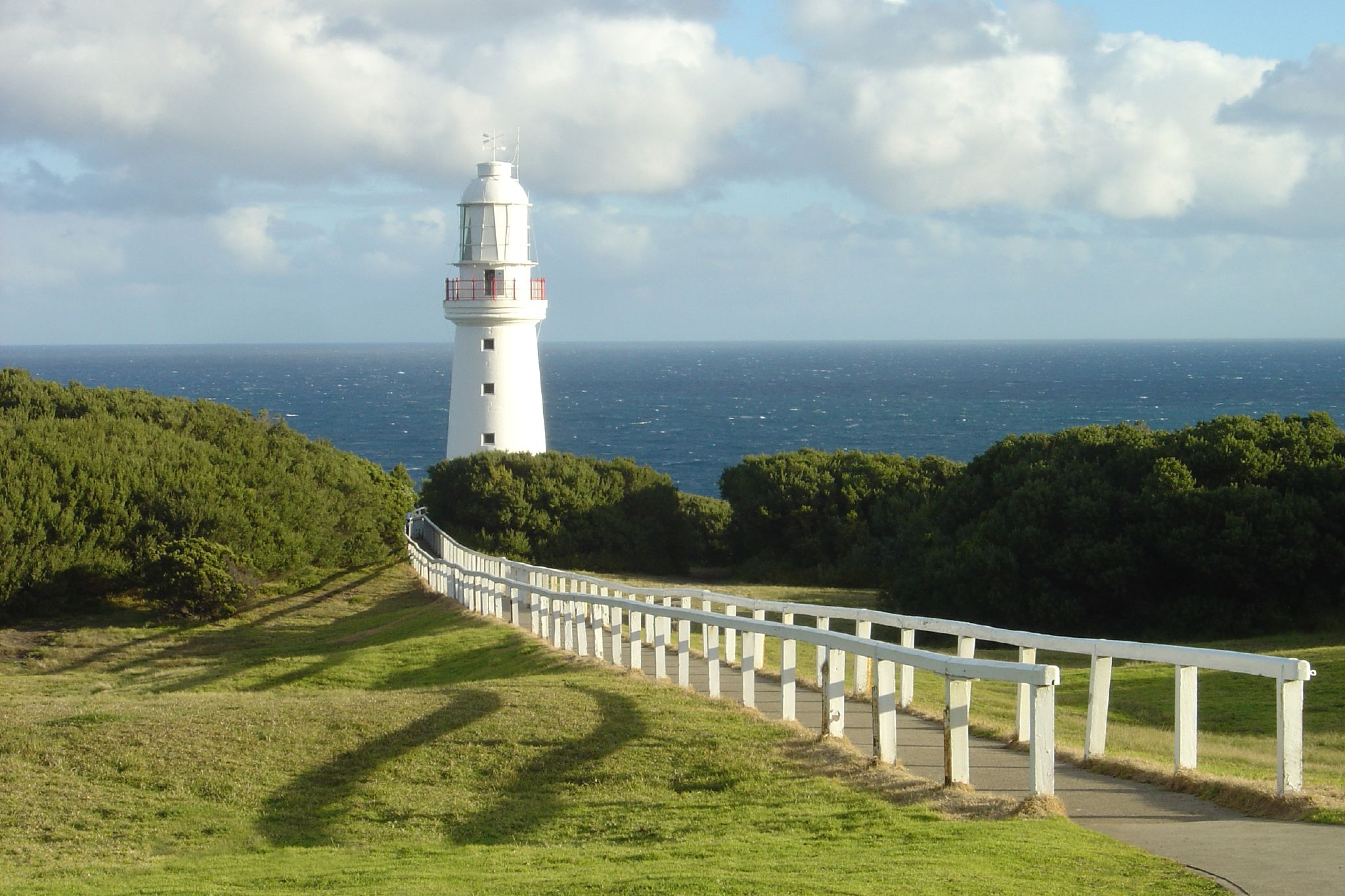
- Cape Otway Lighthouse
- Location: Cape Otway; Victoria; Australia
- Coordinates: 38°51′23.6″S 143°30′42.2″E

Tower
- Constructed: 1848 (first)
- Construction: sandstone tower (first) fiberglass tower (current)
- Height: 20 metres (66 ft) (first); 4 metres (13 ft) (current)
- Shape: conical tower with balcony and lantern
- Markings: white tower and lantern
- Operator: Australian Maritime Safety Authority
- Heritage: listed on the Victorian Heritage Register

Light
- First lit: 1994 (current)
- Deactivated: 1994 (first)
- Focal height: 91 metres (299 ft) (first); 73 metres (240 ft) (current)
- Lens: First order Fresnel
- Intensity: white 1,000,000 cd; Red 4,000 cd
- Range: 26 nautical miles (48 km)
- Characteristic: Fl (3) W 18s. (current)

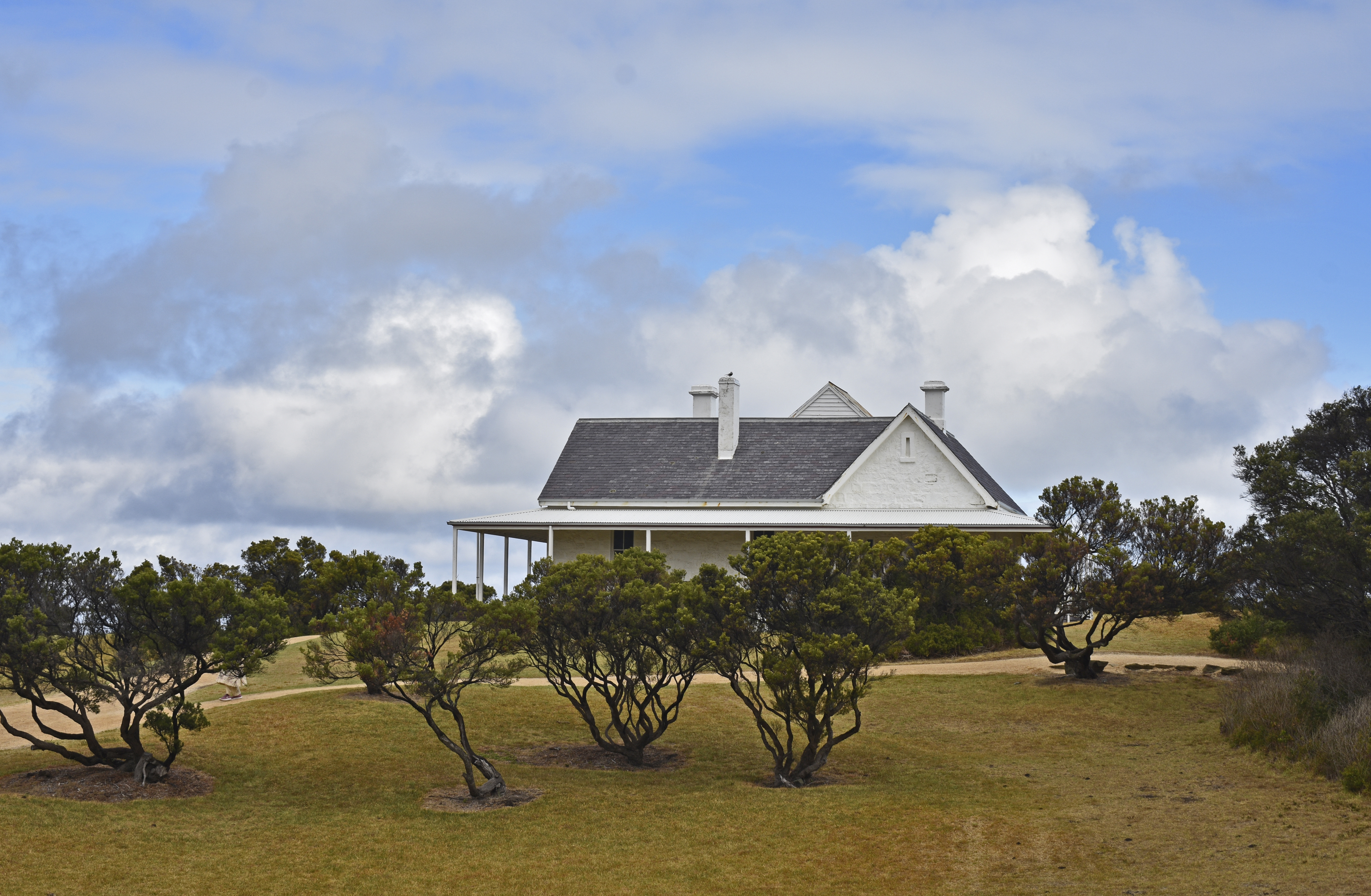
Old Telegraph Station

Cape Otway Lighthouse is a lighthouse on Cape Otway in southern Victoria, Australia. It is Victoria's oldest working lighthouse. During winter to spring, the lighthouse is a vantage point for land-based whale watching as migrating whales swim very close to shores.

The government reserved the tip of the cape as the site for a lighthouse. Access to the site was difficult; it was eventually reached overland and construction of the Cape Otway Lightstation began in 1846 from stone quarried at the Parker River.

The light was first lit in 1848 using a first order Fresnel lens; it was the second lighthouse completed on mainland Australia and it remains the oldest surviving lighthouse in mainland Australia. It was decommissioned in January 1994 after being the longest continuous operating light on the Australian mainland. At the keeper's cottages of Apollo Bay, accommodation is available in two double studios or in the head keeper's cottage that will sleep groups ranging from two to sixteen people. A telegraph station was added to the site when Tasmania was connected to the mainland by a submarine telegraph line from Cape Otway to Launceston in 1859.

Eight ships were wrecked along the coast of Cape Otway. These included the Marie (1851), Sacramento (1853), Schomberg (1855), Loch Ard (1878), Joseph H. Scammell (May 1891), Fiji (September 1891) and the Casino in 1932. The first American vessel sunk during World War II, the SS City of Rayville, was also sunk off the Cape by a German mine in 1940, which sank less than 24 hours after the British Ship S.S. Cambridge off Wilsons Promontory. The Americans built a radar bunker on the cape in 1942 which is now open to the public.

The lightstation was decommissioned in January 1994 after being the longest continuous operating light on the Australian mainland. It has been replaced by a low powered solar light in front of the original tower whose focal plane is at 73 m above sea level. Its light characteristic is three white flashes every 18 seconds.

At the base of the lighthouse, there is a plaque remembering to one of the most mysterious UFO-sightings, the disappearance of Frederick Valentich on 21 October 1978, who had his last radio contact to Cape Otway Lighthouse.

== See also ==
- List of lighthouses in Australia
- Geary River Falls
- Upper Geary River Falls
- Rainbow Falls
