= Ben Sorensen's Real Country =

Presentation
- Hosted by: Ben Sorensen
- Genre: Country Music
- Language: English
- Length: 1hr

Production
- Production: Helmes Media Solutions (Joel Helmes)
- No. of episodes: 200

Publication
- Original release: 2008 – 2015

Ben Sorensen's Real Country was a syndicated Australian country music radio show and podcast. The weekly, hour-long show is hosted by Ben Sorensen. The radio programme was originally broadcast by 4GY based in Gympie, Queensland and from 2011 it has been syndicated to over 100 radio stations across Australia; along with a number in New Zealand, the United States, and United Kingdom. In January 2014 it was broadcast from the Tamworth Country Music Festival for a fortnight.

Sorensen also broadcast Ben Sorensen's Druids Garden.

Ben Sorensen's REAL Country was distributed to radio stations by syndication and is also available as a podcast.
