= Marengo, Victoria =

Marengo
- Town
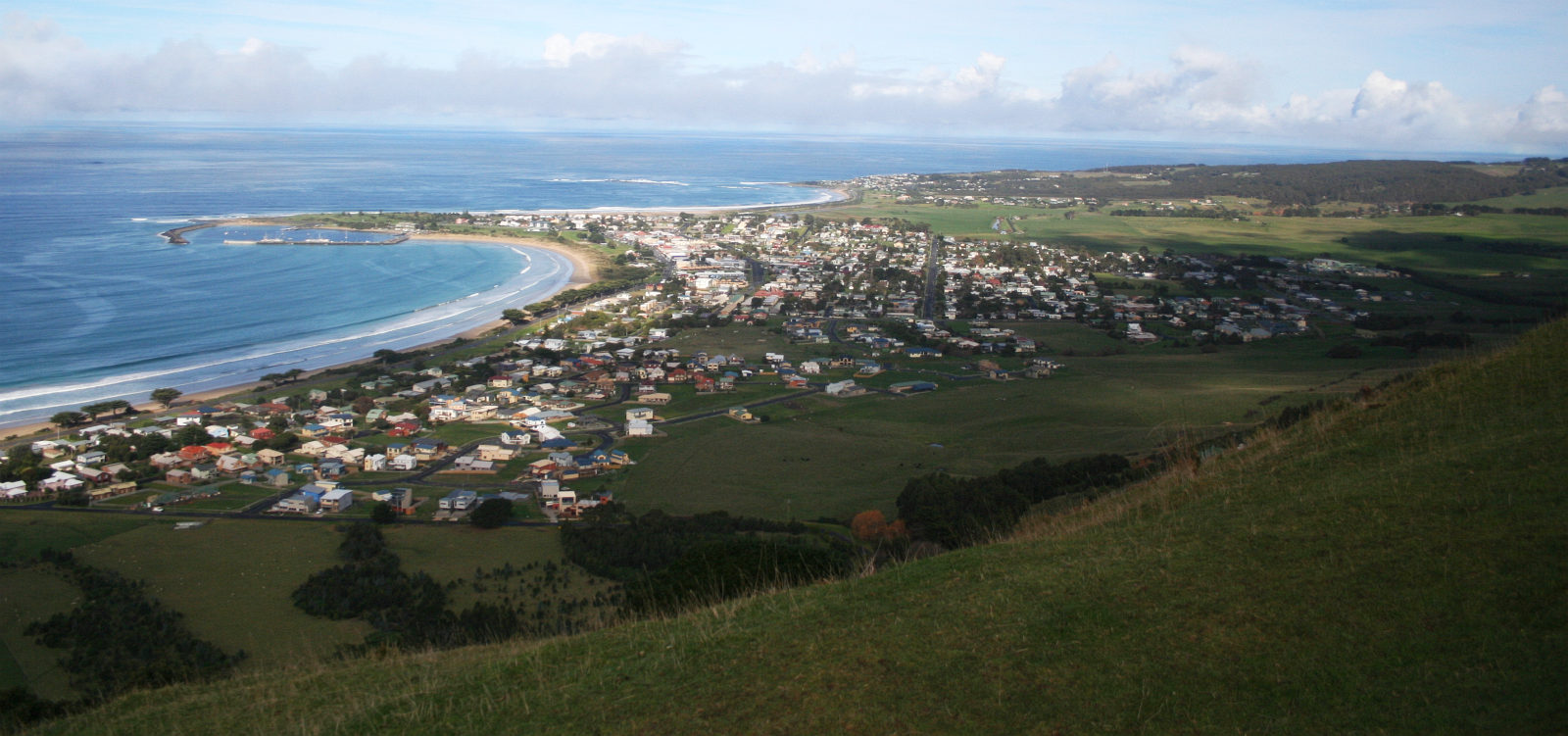
- Marengo behind Apollo Bay's township, from Mariners Lookout to the north-east

- Coordinates: 38°46′48″S 143°39′24″E
- Country: Australia
- State: Victoria
- LGA: Colac Otway Shire

Government
  - State electorate: Polwarth
  - Federal division: Wannon

Population
  - Total: 272 (SAL 2021)
- Postcode: 3233

Marengo is a locality in Victoria, Australia, situated in the Shire of Colac Otway. In the 2016 census, Marengo had a population of 239.Marengo is located next to its neighbor Apollo Bay; the two are often associated with one-another.

== History ==
The area around the township was named during Baudin's expedition to Australia in 1802, Marengo being the name of an Italian battle where France defeated Austria in 1800 during the Napoleonic Wars.

It was proclaimed a township in 1929, but development increased from the 1940s onwards.
