= Geary River Falls =

Waterfall in Victoria, Australia

Geary River Falls (Lower Geary River Falls)
- Location within Victoria
- Location: Cape Otway, Victoria, Australia
- Coordinates: 38°47′43″S 143°36′52″E
- Type: Plunge
- Total height: 3.70 m (12.1 ft)
- Number of drops: 1
- Watercourse: Geary River

Geary River Falls is a waterfall located on the Geary River, within the Otway Ranges, in the locality of Cape Otway, Victoria, Australia. The waterfall consists of a single drop, of a total height of 3.70 metres (12.1 ft).

== Description and access ==
The waterfall is characterised by a series of natural steps, where the water then spreads and spills over the rocks. It can be accessed by the Shelly Beach Picnic Area car park, from where a walking track begins. The track then forks, with the lower track leading to a series of stepping stones over the river, then leading to the beach. After reaching Geary River, the walk then leads upstream, when it then reaches the waterfall.

== See also ==
- Cape Otway Lighthouse
- Blanket Bay
- Iluka Falls
