= Parker River =

Perennial river in Victoria, Australia

Parker
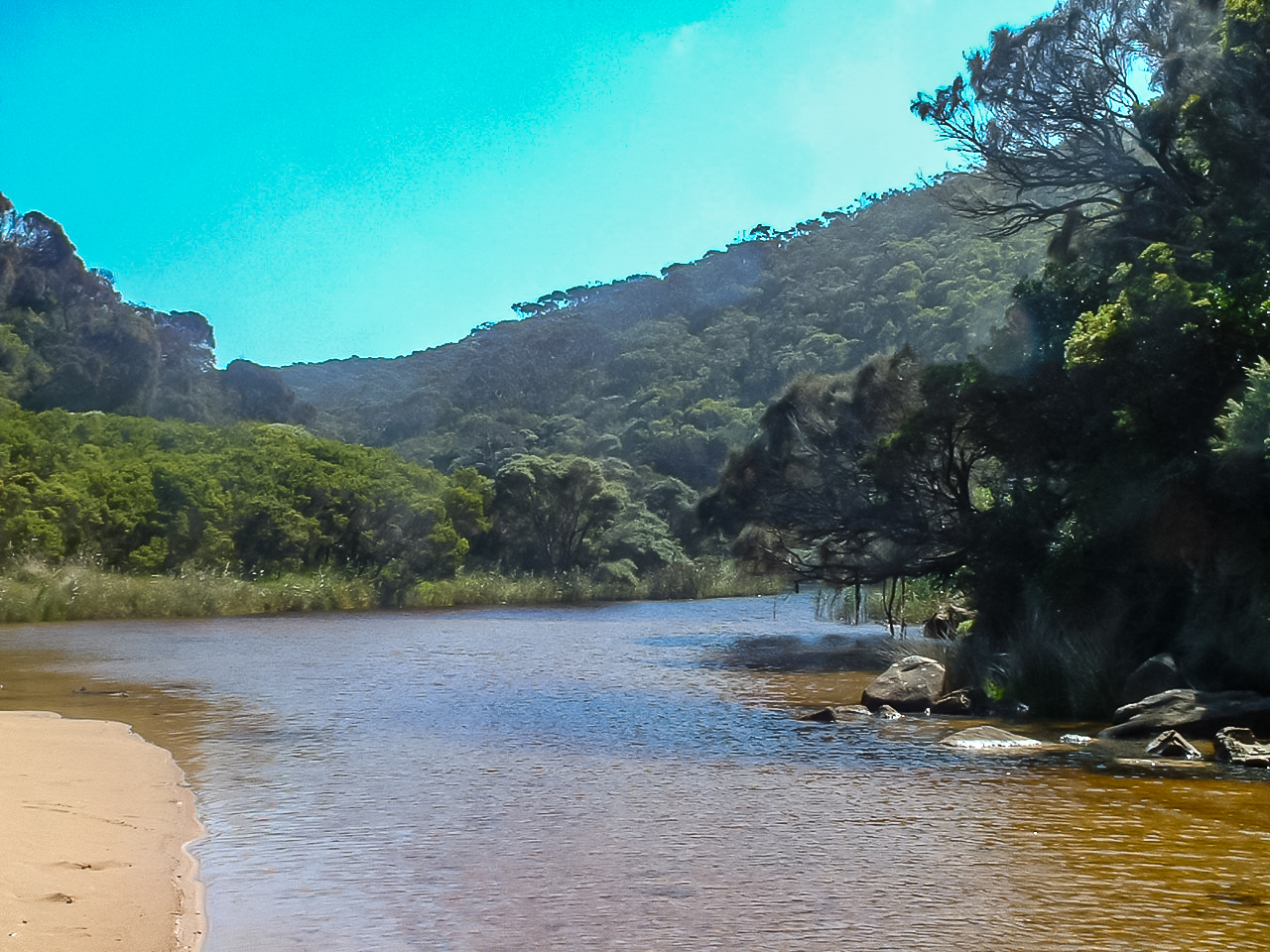
- Parker River

- Location of the Parker River mouth in Victoria
- Etymology: In honour of Amelia Parker
- Native name: Tjeerrang bundit (Gunditjmara)

Location
- Country: Australia
- State: Victoria
- Region: South East Coastal Plain (IBRA), The Otways
- Local government area: Colac Otway Shire

Physical characteristics
- Source: Otway Ranges
  - location: near Parker Spur
  - coordinates: 38°44′51″S 143°34′19″E
  - elevation: 291 m (955 ft)
- Mouth: Bass Strait
  - location: Cape Otway
  - coordinates: 38°50′43″S 143°33′40″E
  - elevation: 0 m (0 ft)
- Length: 13 km (8.1 mi)

Basin features
- River system: Corangamite catchment
- National park: Great Otway National Park

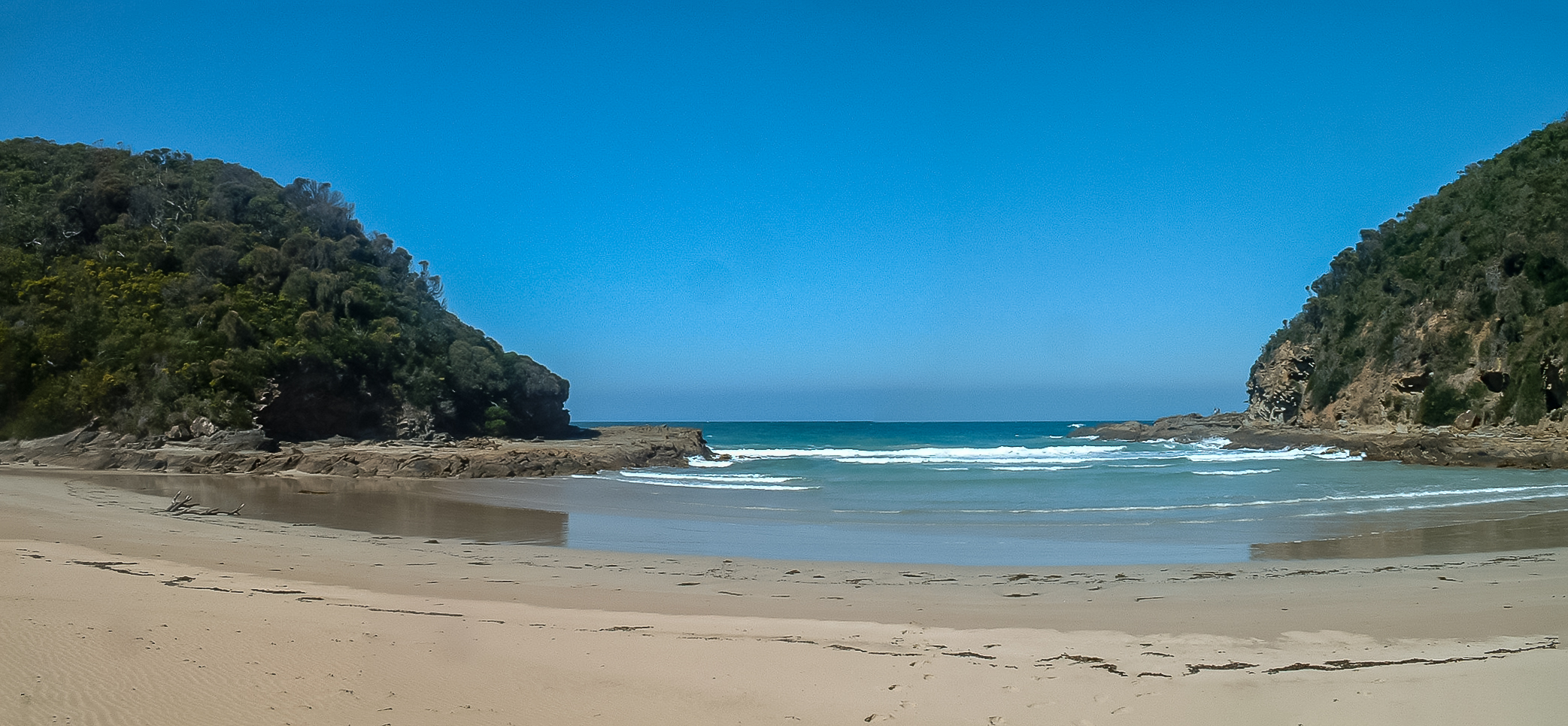
Mouth of the Parker River, Victoria, Australia

The Parker River is a perennial river of the Corangamite catchment, in the Otways region of the Australian state of Victoria.

== Location and features ==
The Parker River rises in the Otway Ranges in southwest Victoria, near Parkers Spur and flows generally south through the Great Otway National Park before reaching its river mouth and emptying into Bass Strait, east of Cape Otway and the Cape Otway Lighthouse, near Point Franklin. From its highest point, the river descends 291 metres (955 ft) over its 13-kilometre (8.1 mi) course.

== Etymology ==
In the Aboriginal Australian Gadubanud language the river is named Tjeerrang bundit, meaning "twigs of spear tree".

The river was given its current name by surveyor George Smythe after Amelia Parker, to whom he was later married.

== See also ==
- List of rivers of Australia § Victoria
