= Apollo Bay =

- Town
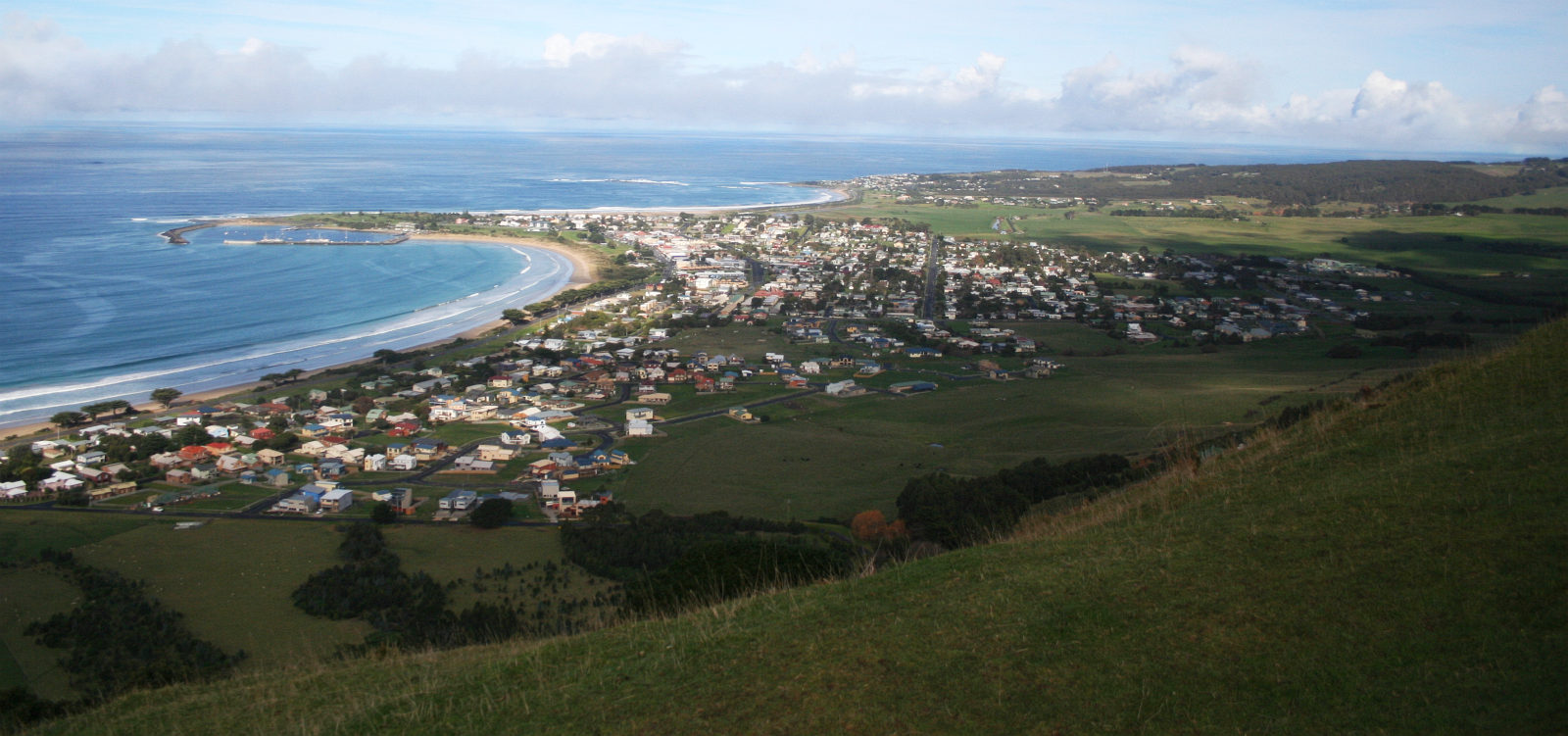
- Apollo Bay township, beach and bay from Mariners Lookout Point to the north-east

- Coordinates: 38°45′0″S 143°39′0″E
- Country: Australia
- State: Victoria
- LGA: Colac Otway Shire
- Location: 191 km (119 mi) SW of Melbourne; 118 km (73 mi) SW of Geelong; 69 km (43 mi) S of Colac; 43 km (27 mi) SW of Lorne; 165 km (103 mi) E of Warrnambool

Government
  - State electorate: Polwarth
  - Federal division: Wannon
- Elevation: 15.0 m (49.2 ft)

Population
  - Total: 1,790 (2021 census)
- Postcode: 3233
Localities around Apollo Bay
Aire Valley	Beech Forest; Tanybryn	Skenes Creek North; Skenes Creek
Cape Otway	Apollo Bay	Bass Strait
Cape Otway	Bass Strait	Marengo

Apollo Bay is a coastal town in southwestern Victoria, Australia. It is situated on the eastern side of Cape Otway, along the edge of the Barham River and on the Great Ocean Road, in the Colac Otway Shire. The town had a population of 1,790 at the 2021 census.

It is a major tourist destination in Victoria. It is host to the annual Apollo Bay WordFest, Winter Wild and the Great Ocean Road Running Festival.

In winter to spring, southern right whales come to the area mainly to breed, bear their calves, and raise them in the warmer, calm waters of South Australia during their migration season. Less frequently, humpback whales can be seen off the coast.

== History ==
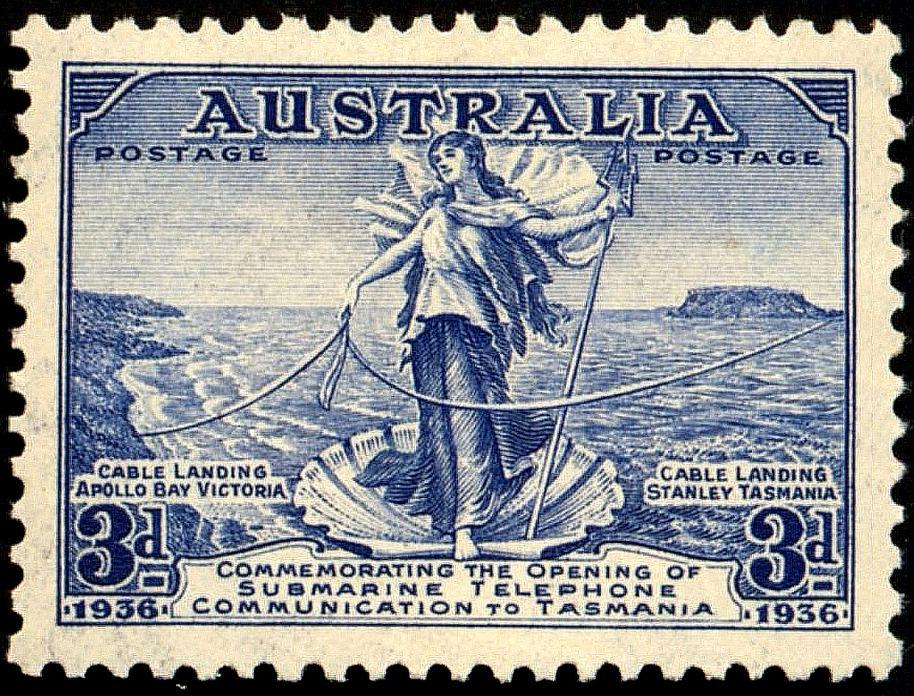
1936 Stamp - Cable to Tasmania depicting the Greek goddess Amphitrite

Apollo Bay is part of the traditional lands of the Gadubanud, or King Parrot people, of the Cape Otway coast. By the early 19th century, the area was being frequented by sealers and whalers from Sydney. One local Indigenous name for the area, of uncertain language origin, is 'Krambruk'.

The bay was named by a Captain Loutit in 1845 when he sheltered his vessel, the Apollo, here from a storm.

The first European settlers were timber cutters in the 1850s who established sawmills. Although the bay provided a relatively sheltered anchorage, the lack of a suitable pier meant that logs were floated out to sea to be loaded on to ships. A township on Apollo Bay was surveyed in 1853 and named Middleton. In the 1860s, farming land was made available and in the mid 1870s, the first blocks in the township were offered for sale. Middleton post office (with a fortnightly mail delivery) opened on 1 May 1873. A school was opened in 1880.

In 1881, the town and post office was renamed Krambruk. That was changed to Apollo Bay in 1898. During this period almost the only access to the area was by sea, but a coach service from Birregurra to Apollo Bay was inaugurated in 1889. The pier at Point Bunbury was swept away in a storm, as was a second pier at that site. Consequently, the "Long Pier" was built at a more sheltered site in 1892.

The town plan indicated that Pascoe Street would be the main thoroughfare, but the erection of several buildings on Collingwood Street meant that it became Apollo Bay's commercial centre. With the upgrade of the road to the town in 1927, and then the completion of the Great Ocean Road in 1932, the area became a tourist destination and an important fishing port.

On 10 July 1932 the coastal steamer Casino sank while attempting to berth at the town jetty. Ten people died. Many earlier shipwrecks had occurred along the Cape Otway coastline.

In 1936 a submarine telegraph and telephone cable from Apollo Bay to Stanley provided the first telephone connection to Tasmania from the mainland. The Apollo Bay Telegraph station closed in 1963 and is now a museum.

== Climate ==
Apollo Bay has an oceanic climate (Cfb) with mild summers and damp winters.

Climate data for Apollo Bay
Month	Jan	Feb	Mar	Apr	May	Jun	Jul	Aug	Sep	Oct	Nov	Dec	Year
Mean daily maximum °C (°F)	21.9 (71.4)	21.8 (71.2)	20.1 (68.2)	18.0 (64.4)	15.7 (60.3)	13.6 (56.5)	13.1 (55.6)	14.0 (57.2)	15.8 (60.4)	17.6 (63.7)	19.2 (66.6)	20.6 (69.1)	17.6 (63.7)
Mean daily minimum °C (°F)	13.9 (57.0)	14.6 (58.3)	12.8 (55.0)	11.5 (52.7)	9.5 (49.1)	8.3 (46.9)	7.3 (45.1)	7.9 (46.2)	8.9 (48.0)	9.5 (49.1)	10.6 (51.1)	12.2 (54.0)	10.6 (51.1)
Average precipitation mm (inches)	52.5 (2.07)	50.3 (1.98)	67.9 (2.67)	82.0 (3.23)	100.3 (3.95)	109.3 (4.30)	117.9 (4.64)	128.4 (5.06)	109.6 (4.31)	98.5 (3.88)	80.0 (3.15)	64.1 (2.52)	1,063.4 (41.87)
Average precipitation days	8.6	8.1	10.8	13.5	16.2	16.3	18.0	18.7	16.8	15.2	12.8	10.7	165.7

== Events and festivals ==
Events and festivals that have been held in Apollo Bay include:

- Winterwild
- Great Ocean Road Running Festival
- Apollo Bay Seafood Festival (last held in 2023)
- Apollo Bay and Otway District Agricultural Show
- The Apollo Bay Music Festival (first held in 1993 and last held in 2013). A poster for the festival of 1999 by Jeff Ragus was featured on a postage stamp issued by Australia Post in 2006.

== Media ==
The local radio station is Apollo Bay Radio on 87.6 FM, broadcasting from studios in Apollo Bay. Also available in Apollo Bay is Mixx FM on 95.9 FM, OCR FM on 88.7 FM, Flow FM on 97.9 FM, and 774 ABC Melbourne on 89.5 FM.

== Sport ==
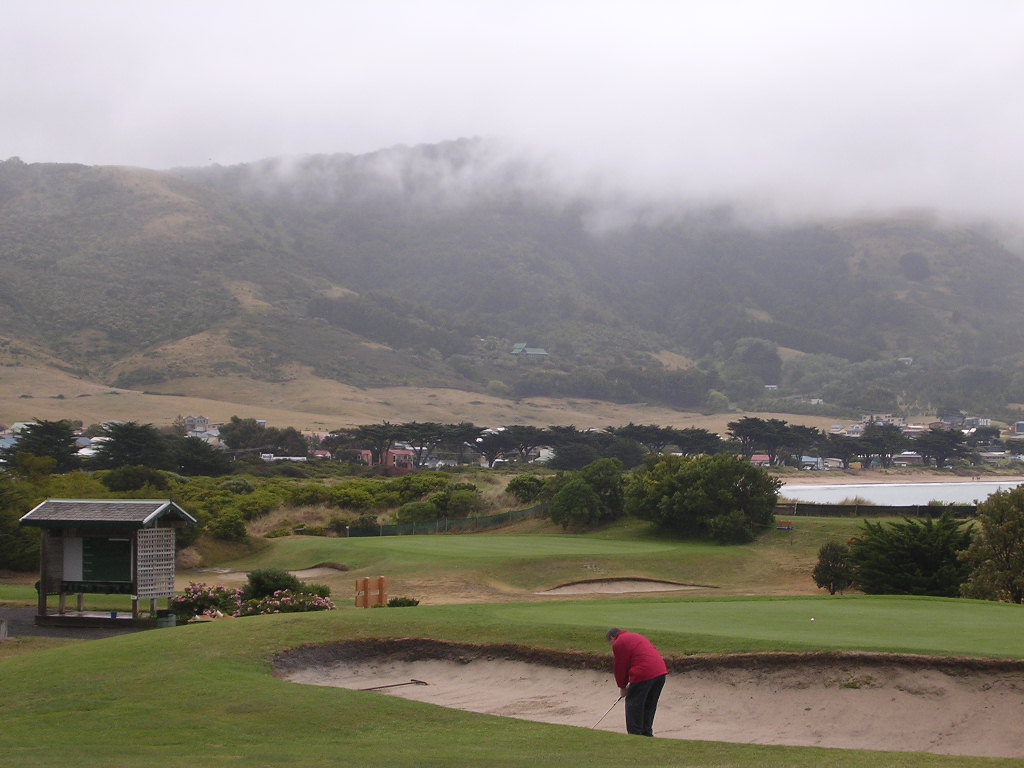
Apollo Bay Golf Club

Apollo Bay is host to various sports clubs, including:

- Apollo Bay Surf Lifesaving Club, which was established in 1952 as a result of a meeting held on the foreshore by interested townspeople and Surf Lifesaving Victoria officials. The Apollo Bay SLSC became the ninth club to be affiliated with Surf Lifesaving Victoria. It is now affiliated with Life Saving Victoria, following the merger of the Victorian branch of the Royal Life Saving Society Australia and Surf Life Saving Victoria.
- Apollo Bay Sailing Club, which provides opportunities for sailing to people of a diverse range of abilities and age groups.
- Apollo Bay Golf Club, located on Nelson Street.
- Apollo Bay and Otways Riding Club.
- The Apollo Bay Football Netball Club, which has been affiliated with the Colac & District Football and Netball League since 1972.
- The Apollo Bay Sharks Cricket Club.

Additionally, Apollo Bay has hosted overnight stops on the Great Victorian Bike Ride six times (1991, 1996, 2000, 2004, 2009 and 2016), including serving as the host for the rest day on the last four of those visits.

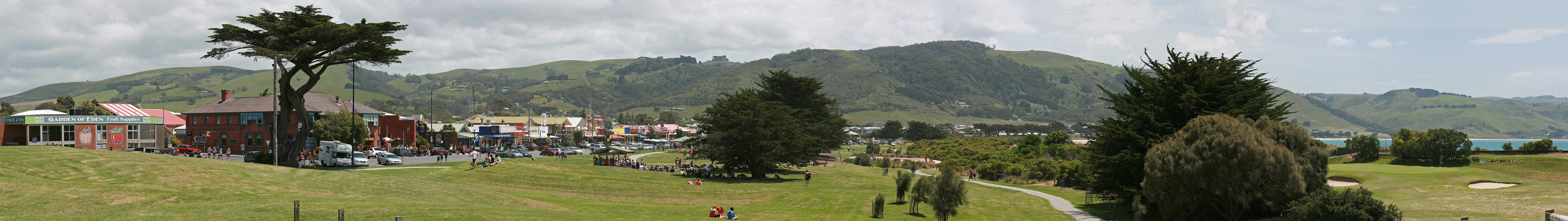
A panoramic view of the town, showing the main shopping strip on the Great Ocean Road (Collingwood Street), the foreshore reserve with surrounding hills in background, and the Apollo Bay Golf Club backed by the beach and bay

== Notable people ==
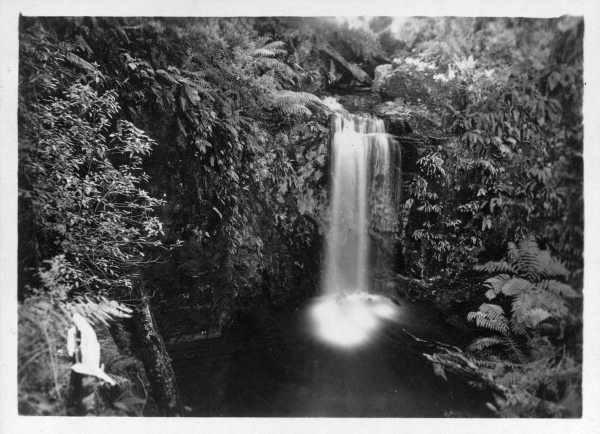
Marriners Falls, Apollo Bay, 1935

- Neil Melville – an actor born in Sydney, but spent his childhood in Apollo Bay
- Sid O'Neil - member of the rock band The Vasco Era
- Ted O'Neil - member of the rock band The Vasco Era
- Michael Fitzgerald – member of the rock band The Vasco Era
- H. A. Willis – essayist, spent his early childhood in Apollo Bay
