= Cape Otway =

- Town
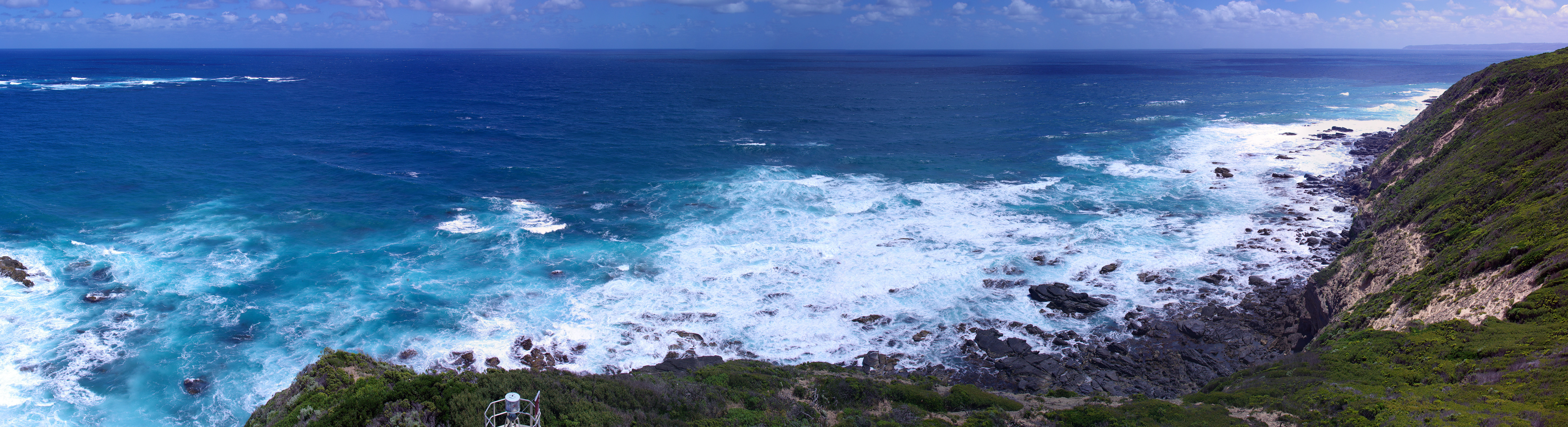
- Cape Otway coast

- Coordinates: 38°51′0″S 143°31′0″E
- Country: Australia
- State: Victoria
- LGA: Colac Otway Shire
- Location: 106 km (66 mi) SW of Geelong; 171 km (106 mi) SW of Melbourne

Government
  - State electorate: Polwarth
  - Federal division: Corangamite

Population
  - Total: 34 (2021 census)
Localities around Cape Otway
Glenaire	Aire Valley	Apollo Bay
Hordern Vale	Cape Otway	Apollo Bay
Southern Ocean	Southern Ocean	Bass Strait

Cape Otway is a cape and a bounded locality of the Colac Otway Shire in southern Victoria, Australia on the Great Ocean Road; much of the area is enclosed in the Great Otway National Park. The cape marks the boundary between the Southern Ocean on the west and Bass Strait on the east.

== History ==
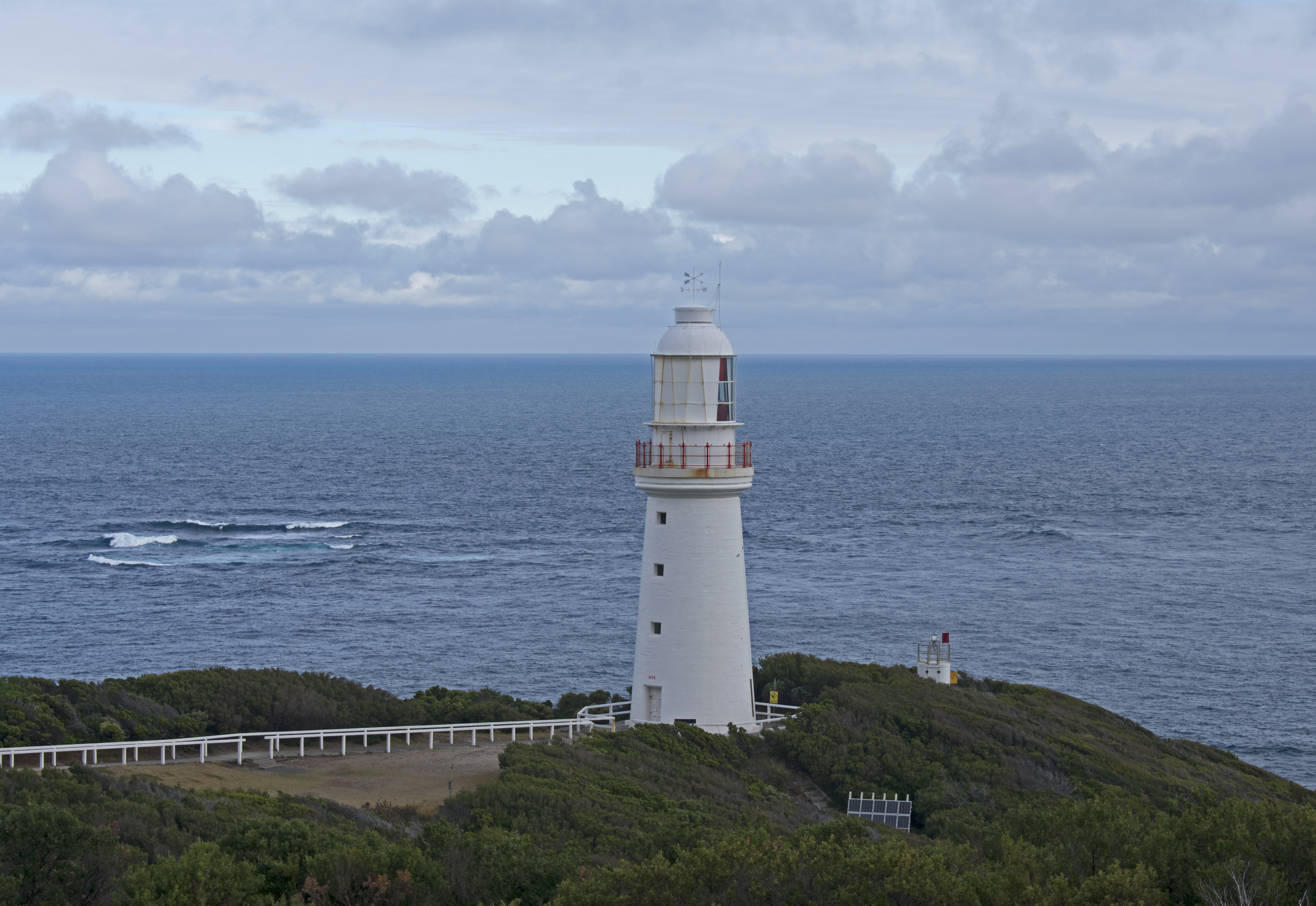
Cape Otway Lighthouse

Cape Otway was originally inhabited by the Gadubanud people; evidence of their campsites is contained in the middens throughout the region. The traditional Gadubanud name for the cape is Bangurac.

The cape was charted by the British when Lieutenant James Grant sailed through Bass Strait in HMS Lady Nelson in December 1800. Grant named it Cape Albany Otway after Captain William Albany Otway. This was later shortened to Cape Otway.

The British started to colonise the region in 1837 when Joseph Gellibrand and George Hesse became lost in the Otways on an expedition. It was found that Hesse probably died of exposure, while Gellibrand was initially cared for by a local Aboriginal clan but later killed by members of another clan visiting from the Apollo Bay area. The ship Joanna was wrecked near the Cape in 1843, with several survivors making a difficult journey by foot along the coast back toward Geelong. Mr Kearnon attempted to establish a livestock property at Moonlight Head in 1845 but his hut was burnt down and his shepherd supposedly killed by the resident Gadubanud people.

More detailed exploration occurred in 1846 when a number of surveying expeditions entered the area with the view of placing a lighthouse upon Cape Otway. During these assignments, an Aboriginal man was attacked by colonists with stockwhips, while a surveyor's assistant by the name of James Conroy was killed by the Gadubanud. A reprisal force led by the surveyor and consisting of a well-armed militia of Barrabool men was organised by the district official Captain Foster Fyans. This force exterminated almost completely the remaining Gadubanud population of around ten people.

Cape Otway Lighthouse was built on the point of the cape in 1848. The lighthouse is listed on the Victorian Heritage Register.

A telegraph office opened in 1859. The post office opened on 1 September 1880 and closed in 1972.

Eight ships were wrecked along the coast of Cape Otway: Marie (1851), Sacramento (1853), Schomberg (1855), Loch Ard (1878), Joseph H. Scammell (May 1891), Fiji (September 1891), and Casino in 1932. The first American vessel sunk during World War II, MS City of Rayville, was also sunk off the cape by a German mine. Following this, the Americans built a radar bunker on the cape in 1942; it is now open to the public.

== Commercial fisheries ==
The hostile seas, where the Southern Ocean meets with Bass Strait, that surround Cape Otway are home to some of the world's most prized marine species, including crayfish and abalone. On calm days, as many as 20 abalone dive boats commonly operate along the shoreline beneath the lighthouse. Commercial crayfishers use baited pots or traps throughout the reef system, with white floats on the surface marking their locations.

== Climate ==
Cape Otway has an oceanic climate (Cfb) with mild summers and cool damp winters, and only 38 clear days annually.

Climate data for Cape Otway Lighthouse
Month	Jan	Feb	Mar	Apr	May	Jun	Jul	Aug	Sep	Oct	Nov	Dec	Year
Record high °C (°F)	43.3 (109.9)	42.0 (107.6)	40.6 (105.1)	33.3 (91.9)	27.8 (82.0)	24.4 (75.9)	21.8 (71.2)	25.0 (77.0)	31.0 (87.8)	34.2 (93.6)	39.4 (102.9)	43.4 (110.1)	43.4 (110.1)
Mean daily maximum °C (°F)	21.4 (70.5)	21.5 (70.7)	20.4 (68.7)	18.0 (64.4)	15.6 (60.1)	13.7 (56.7)	13.0 (55.4)	13.8 (56.8)	15.2 (59.4)	17.0 (62.6)	18.3 (64.9)	19.9 (67.8)	17.3 (63.1)
Mean daily minimum °C (°F)	13.4 (56.1)	14.0 (57.2)	13.3 (55.9)	11.7 (53.1)	10.1 (50.2)	8.5 (47.3)	7.6 (45.7)	7.9 (46.2)	8.5 (47.3)	9.6 (49.3)	10.8 (51.4)	12.1 (53.8)	10.6 (51.1)
Record low °C (°F)	3.3 (37.9)	2.8 (37.0)	−1.1 (30.0)	1.7 (35.1)	1.7 (35.1)	1.7 (35.1)	0.0 (32.0)	1.1 (34.0)	−1.1 (30.0)	−0.6 (30.9)	1.4 (34.5)	3.3 (37.9)	−1.1 (30.0)
Average precipitation mm (inches)	44.3 (1.74)	41.5 (1.63)	55.4 (2.18)	70.7 (2.78)	91.5 (3.60)	96.6 (3.80)	106.2 (4.18)	104.1 (4.10)	90.1 (3.55)	80.1 (3.15)	62.7 (2.47)	52.5 (2.07)	894.8 (35.23)
Average precipitation days	9.3	8.4	12.0	14.8	17.9	18.4	19.9	20.1	18.1	16.3	13.5	11.8	180.5
Average relative humidity (%)	74	75	75	76	78	80	80	78	76	75	74	74	76
