= List of waterfalls in Tasmania =

This is a list of waterfalls of Tasmania, Australia.

- Adams Falls
- Adamsons Falls
- Alberton Falls
- Angel Falls
- Arm Falls
- Arndell Falls
- Arve Falls
- Bagota Falls
- Barren Rock Falls
- Barrow Falls
- Bastion Cascades
- Beckett Falls
- Bella-Macargee Falls
- Berwyn Falls
- Betts Falls
- Billy Browns Falls
- Blairgowrie Falls
- Blushrock Falls
- Boulder Falls
- Branigan Falls
- Bridal Veil Falls - near Moina
- Cam Falls
- Cam (Upper) Falls
- Camp Falls
- Cashs Falls
- Castra Falls
- Cataract Falls
- Cathedral Falls
- Cephissus Falls
- Champagne Falls
- Chasm Falls
- Clarke Falls
- Coal Falls
- Connellys Falls
- Cooee Falls
- Cooma Falls
- Coxs Falls
- Crater Falls
- Creekton Falls
- Cuckoo Falls
- Cumberland Falls
- Curran Falls
- D'Alton Falls
- Darling Falls
- Dasher Falls
- Deep Falls
- Delaneys Falls
- Detention Falls
- Dickensons Falls
- Dip Falls
- Dooleys Falls
- Doone Falls
- Dora Falls
- Dynamo Falls
- Eldon Falls
- Elephant Falls
- Elver Falls
- Evercreech Falls
- Fairy Falls
- Falls of Clyde
- Feather Falls
- Ferguson Falls
- Ferntree Falls
- Fitzroy Falls
- Forth Falls
- Frazer Falls
- Gads Falls
- Galadriels Cascades
- Georges Falls
- Grail Falls
- Granite Falls
- Grey Mare's Tail Falls
- Guide Falls
- Halls Falls
- Hardings Falls
- Harman Falls
- Harridge Falls
- Hartnett Falls
- Havelock Falls
- Heemskirk Falls
- Heisis Falls
- Heritage Falls
- Hidden Falls
- Hogarth Falls
- Holwell Falls
- Honor Falls
- Horeb Falls
- Horseshoe Falls
- Horsetail Falls
- Hullabaloo Falls
- Hutchinsons Falls
- Innes Falls
- Ironbark Falls
- Jeanbrook Falls
- Jeffries Falls
- Joy Falls
- Keoghs Falls
- Kermandie Falls
- Kettle Falls
- Kia Ora Falls
- Kiernans Falls
- Kindred Falls
- Knyvet Falls
- Kohls Falls
- Krushka Falls
- Ladder Falls
- Lady Barron Falls
- Leeaberra Falls
- Lewis Falls
- Liffey Falls
- Lilydale Falls
- Lobster Falls
- Logan Falls
- Lomatia Falls
- Lost Falls
- Lovers Falls
- Lower Hartz Falls
- Lower Sprent Falls
- Marriotts Falls
- Mathinna Falls
- Mavista Falls
- McCoy Falls
- McGowans Falls
- McHughs Falls
- McLean Falls
- Meadstone Falls
- Meander Falls
- Meetus Falls
- Meribah Falls
- Midgley Falls
- Milligan Falls
- Mimosa Falls
- Minnow Falls
- Montana Falls
- Montezuma Falls
- Myrtle Forest Falls
- Narrawa Creek Falls
- Nelson Falls
- Netherby Creek Falls
- New Town Falls
- Nicholls Falls
- No Name Falls
- O'Gradys Falls
- Oldaker Falls
- Orites Falls
- Owen Brook Falls
- Oxley Falls
- Parsons Falls
- Pelion Falls
- Pelverata Falls
- Pencil Pine Cascades
- Pencil Pine Falls
- Pet Falls
- Phillips Falls
- Philosopher Falls
- Pig Trough Falls
- Plateau Falls
- Pooali Falls
- Princess Falls
- Punna Falls
- Quaile Falls
- Radcliff Falls
- Ralphs Falls
- Rawlinson Falls
- Razorback Falls
- Redwater Creek Falls
- Redwater Falls
- Reggies Falls
- Reuben Falls
- Reynolds Falls
- Richmond Falls
- Rinadena Falls
- Rocky Sprent Falls
- Russell Falls
- Sandersons Falls
- Sarahs Waterfall
- Sardine Creek Falls
- Serpent Falls
- Sharpes Falls
- Shower Falls
- Silver Falls - Collinsvale
- Silver Falls - Fern Tree
- Silver Falls - Nietta
- Sir John Falls
- Six and Twenty Falls
- Skew Falls
- Slippery Falls
- Snug Falls
- Split Rock Falls
- St Clair Falls
- St Columba Falls
- St Georges Falls
- St Joseph's Falls
- St Patricks Falls
- Step Falls
- Stitt Falls
- Storys Falls
- Strickland Falls
- Sunshine Falls
- Svengali Falls
- Tailboard Falls
- Tarkine Falls
- Tevelein Falls
- Tomahawk Falls
- Tumbledown Falls
- Upper Guide Falls
- Upper Hartz Falls
- Upper Heemskirk Falls
- Upper Liffey Falls
- V C Falls
- Vanishing Falls
- Victoria Valley Falls
- Violet Falls
- Wandle Falls
- Waratah Falls
- Warners Falls
- Webber Falls
- Wellington Falls
- Westmorland Falls
- Whalers Falls
- Whitham Falls
- Willies Falls
- Wilsons Falls
- Winsome Falls
- Winterbrook Falls

== See also ==
- List of waterfalls
