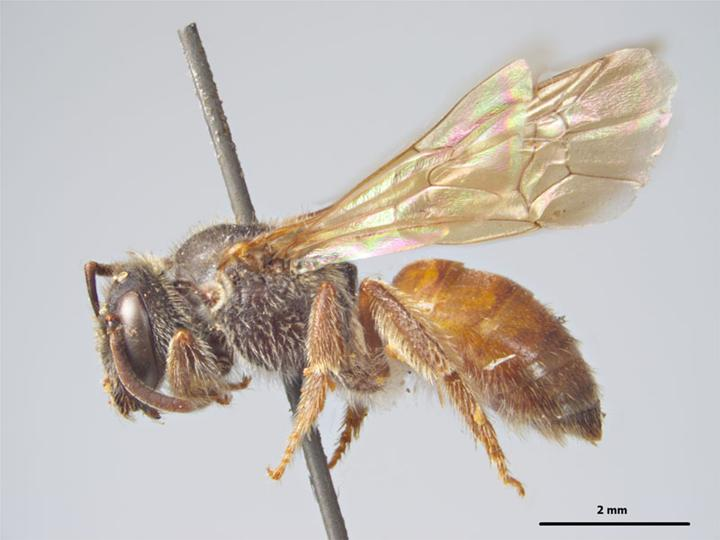
- Female

Scientific classification
- Kingdom: Animalia
- Phylum: Arthropoda
- Clade: Pancrustacea
- Class: Insecta
- Order: Hymenoptera
- Family: Halictidae
- Genus: Lasioglossum
- Species: L. taluchis

Binomial name
- Lasioglossum taluchis Smith, 1853

Synonyms
- Parasphecodes taluchis Smith, 1853; Parasphecodes perustus Cockerell, 1914; Parasphecodes submoratus Cockerell, 1930

= Lasioglossum taluchis =

Species of bee

Lasioglossum taluchis, or Lasioglossum (Parasphecodes) taluchis, is a species of bee in the family Halictidae and subfamily Halictinae. It is endemic to Australia. It was described by English entomologist Frederick Smith in 1853.

== Taxonomy ==
A taxonomic note in the Australian Faunal Directory reads: "Smith 1853 described ten species names that were partial anagrams of "Halictus". These names should be treated as nouns in apposition rather than adjectival and therefore should not have been changed in Michener's (1965) revision. Therefore, Lasioglossum taluche is reverted to Lasioglossum taluchis."

== Distribution and habitat ==
The species occurs in south-eastern Australia. Type localities include Mount Wellington and Russell Falls National Park in Tasmania.

== Behaviour ==
The adults are flying mellivores. Flowering plants visited by the bees include Acacia, Aotus, Prostanthera, Eucalyptus, Leptospermum, Bursaria and Banksia species.

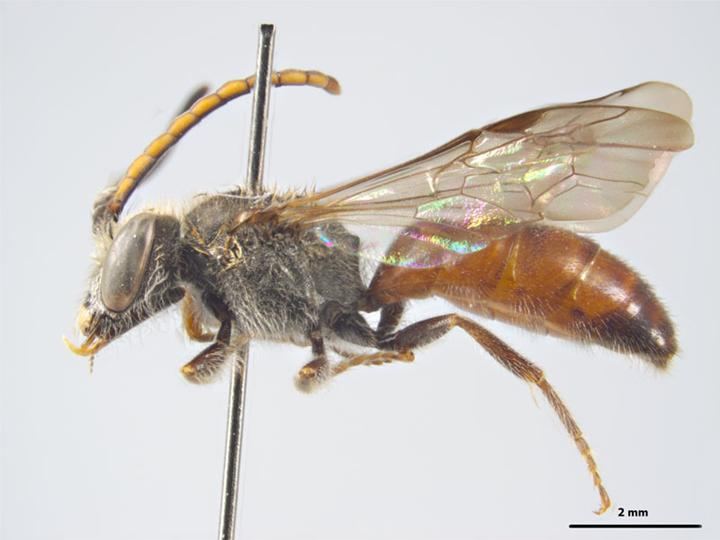
Male
