= Lindsay Peet =

Australian real estate developer and historian

Lindsay James Peet (5 October 1939 – 26 September 2012) was a Western Australian real estate developer and historian.

Peet was born on 5 October 1939, the only son of Cyril and Ethel Peet, and grandson of James Peet, who established the Peet and Co. real estate development company. He was educated at Hale School, and subsequently the University of Western Australia. Peet obtained a Bachelor of Science in geology, and initially worked as a geologist, and in 1967 as a hydrogeologist for the Geological Survey of Western Australia. In the 1960s, at Kalgoorlie, Peet married his wife, Laurel. They had two sons, Nigel and Julian.

Peet returned to Perth, joined the families real estate business, and earned a Diploma in Valuation and a Diploma in Real Estate Management. He remained working for Peet and Co. until his retirement in 1985, after the company merged and expanded.

Peet became a professional historian, specialising in military history, after completing a Graduate Diploma in Applied Heritage Studies from Curtin University. His 1995 thesis on an emergency landing in the Kimberley by Shady Lady, an American B-24 Liberator bomber, and the crew's rescue by the local Aboriginal people and monks, was the basis for the 2012 film Shady Lady.

Peet was also a philanthropist, giving assistance to causes such as conservation works at New Norcia, the Australian Museum Of Motion Picture & Television, the Historical Records Rescue Consortium Project at the State Library of Western Australia, and a project to preserve the library's Oral History collection. Lindsay was given the Gem of Time award in 2009, and appointed a Fellow of the Library Board in 2012.
