= Clara Barron =

British Australian philanthropist (1857–1936)

Lady Clara Emily Barron
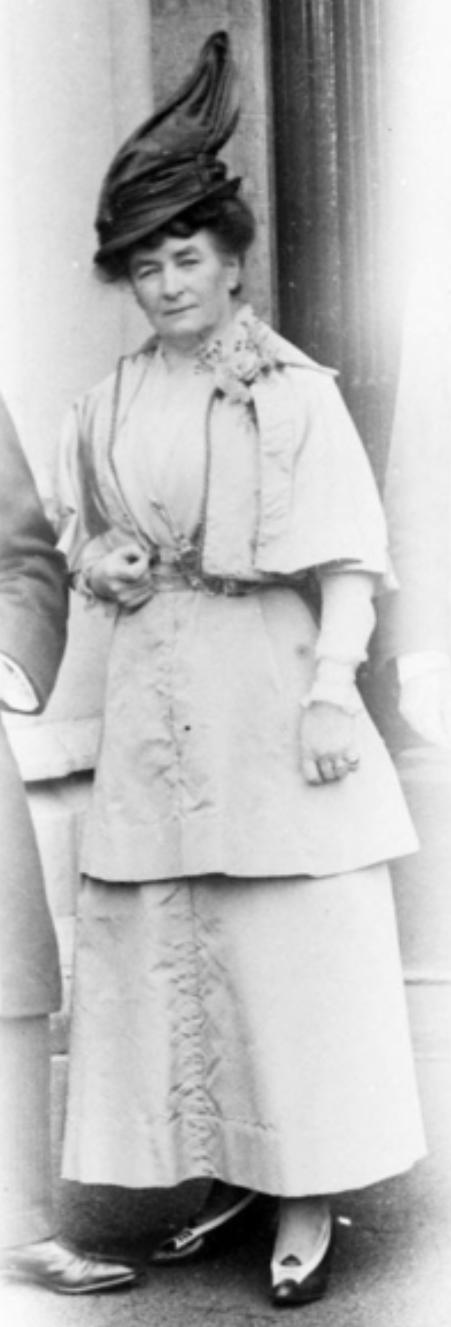
- Born: Clara Emily Kelly; 18 December 1857; Watford, Hertfordshire, England
- Died: 24 May 1936 (aged 78); Waybridge, Surrey, England
- Known for: Founder and inaugural President of the Western Australian division of the Australian Red Cross

Clara Emily Barron, Lady Barron (born Clara Emily Kelly, 18 December 1857 – 24 May 1936) was the founder and president of the Western Australian division of the Australian Red Cross, presiding over the division during World War I. Barron inspired the names of the settlement Lady Barron, Tasmania, and Lady Barron Falls. She was married to Sir Harry Barron, who was the 10th Governor of Tasmania, and the 16th of Western Australia.

== Early life ==
She was born in Watford, Hertfordshire, England on 18 December 1857, to Clara Ward, and Thomas Conyngham Kelly. She married Harry Barron in 1877, and had a daughter Lilian Vaughan Barron, born in 1878 in St Helen, Jersey, and a son Harry Montague Vaughan Barron, born in 1881 in Abertay, Broughty Ferry, Scotland. Her son, who was a member of the Queen's Own Cameron Highlanders, died aged 27 in February 1909 a few months before she moved to Australia.

== Australia ==
On 20 August 1909 she left London heading for Tasmania, Australia. Before departing she was asked to take the role of President of the Alexandra Hospital.

When World War I broke out in August 1914, Lady Helen Munro Ferguson wrote to Barron, making her a member of the central branch of the Australian Red Cross, which Ferguson had formed in response to the war. Ferguson also invited Barron to form and preside over the Western Australian division as its president. With her presiding over the Red Cross division, they raised over £60,000. She set the memorial tablet for Anzac Cottage on 12 February 1916.

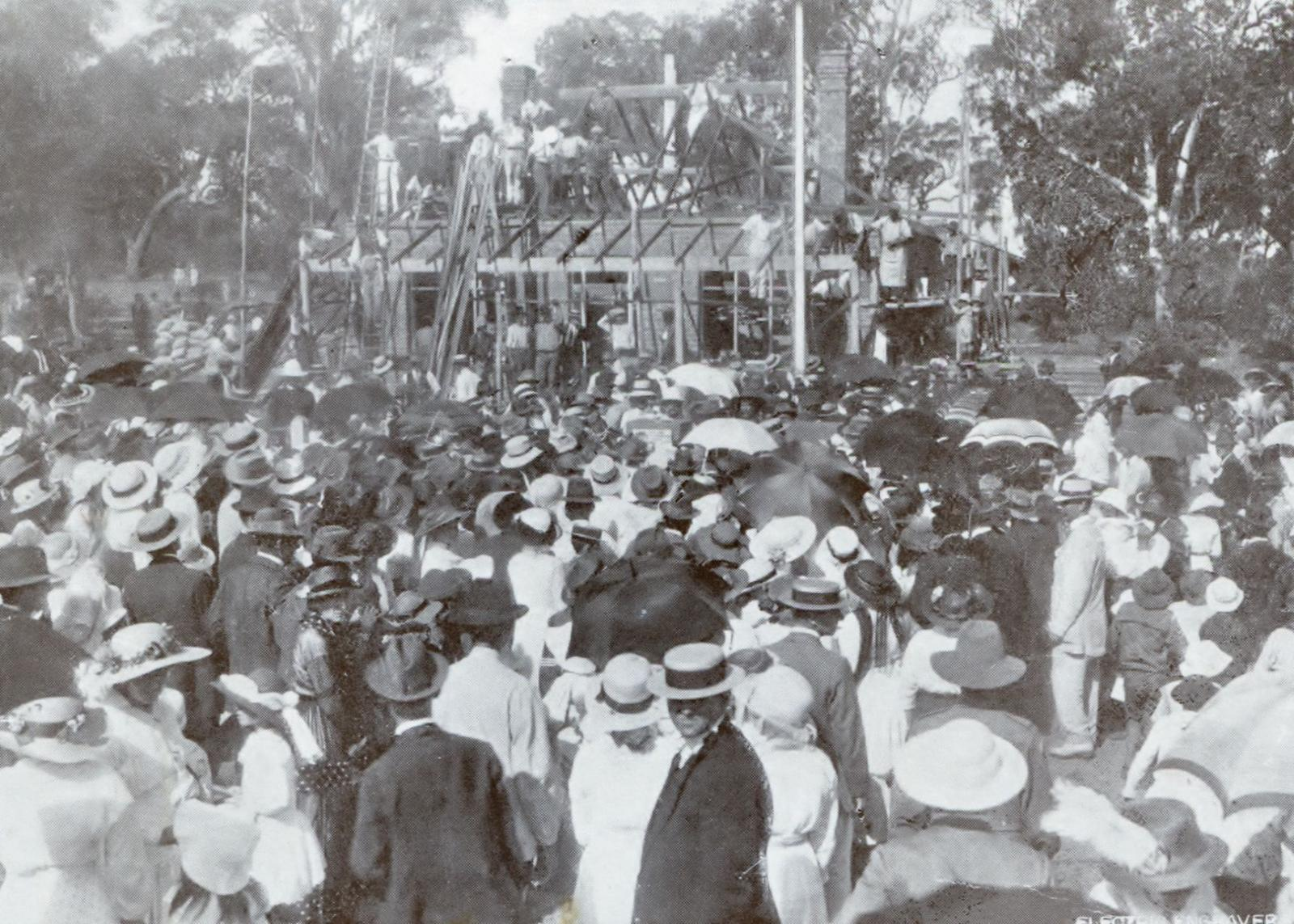
Lady Clara Barron, setting the memorial tablet at the Anzac Cottage

Barron was an avid gardener, and when her request for the top growth of roses to be pruned at the Western Australian Government House gardens was ignored, she pruned the 700 rose bushes herself.

== Later life ==
After Barron's husband died in 1921, Barron found that he had lost most of their money, and the estate had very little left. He had spent much of their private money during his governorships, and lost the rest to failed Russian investments. Barron received a pension of £150 per year from the war office due to her husband's military service which was subsumed by the interest on the large mortgage of her residence Swiss Cottage in Surrey. During the next decade she took in paying guests, sold off her furniture, jewellery and other possessions, and relied on friends’ assistance to pay her mortgage, as she was unable to find a buyer for the large property. In 1930, she sustained a spinal injury resulting in her needing daily assistance. When faced with being unable to pay her assistant, she applied through the Dominion office for financial assistance. Edward Marsh, (who Barron coincidentally knew, from her time in Malta as Marsh had accompanied Winston Churchill on a visit to Malta and stayed with the Barrons) corresponded on behalf of J. H. Thomas the Secretary of State of the Dominions, to ascertain that Barron's pension with the war office could not be increased, and she was not entitled to a pension for her husband's posts as a governor of the dominion states. Furthermore it was found that the Royal Artillery Charity had assisted her previously, and could not assist a second time. The war office provided provided a £20 grant. Barron's husband's former private secretary, Lieutenant Colonel Harry Ernest Cadell, who had been living with Barron at Swiss Cottage stated he would contact her family. In 1931, her grandson Victor Alexander Charles Findlay agreed to take over her mortgage payments.

Barron continued living in her residence Swiss Cottage in Waybridge, Surrey, until she died on 24 May 1936.
