= Slippery Falls =

Waterfall in Tasmania

Slippery Falls is a cascade waterfall near Pelverata Falls, Tasmania. There are no tracks leading to the base of the falls, but one can see them from the Pelverata Falls Trail.

== See also ==
- List of waterfalls
- List of waterfalls in Tasmania
