= Pelverata Falls =

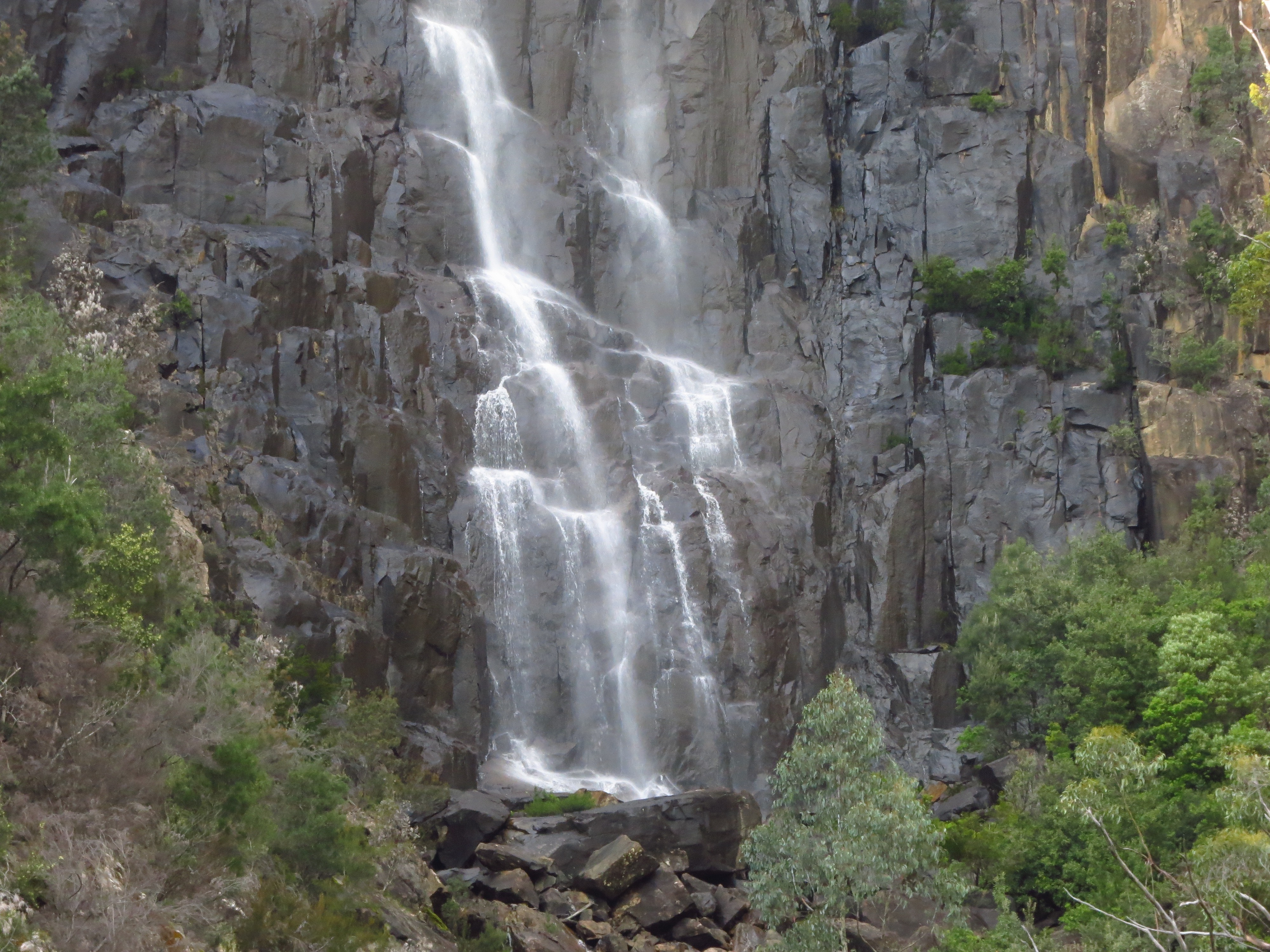

- Location within Tasmania
- Location: Tasmania
- Coordinates: 43.064°S 147.138°E
- Total height: 114 m (374 ft)

Pelverata Falls is a 114-metre-high (374 ft) waterfall in the Snug Tiers, Southern Tasmania. In winter and spring the falls are a spectacular sight and have heaps of water coming over them, however, in summer the falls slows to a trickle and sometimes even dries up completely. The track to Pelverata Falls takes approximately 2 hours and also has a viewpoint of Slippery Falls from across the gorge near Pelverata Falls.

In 1976, a teenager slipped and fell near the falls.

== See also ==
- List of waterfalls
- List of waterfalls in Tasmania
