= Mount Field National Park =

- IUCN category II (national park)
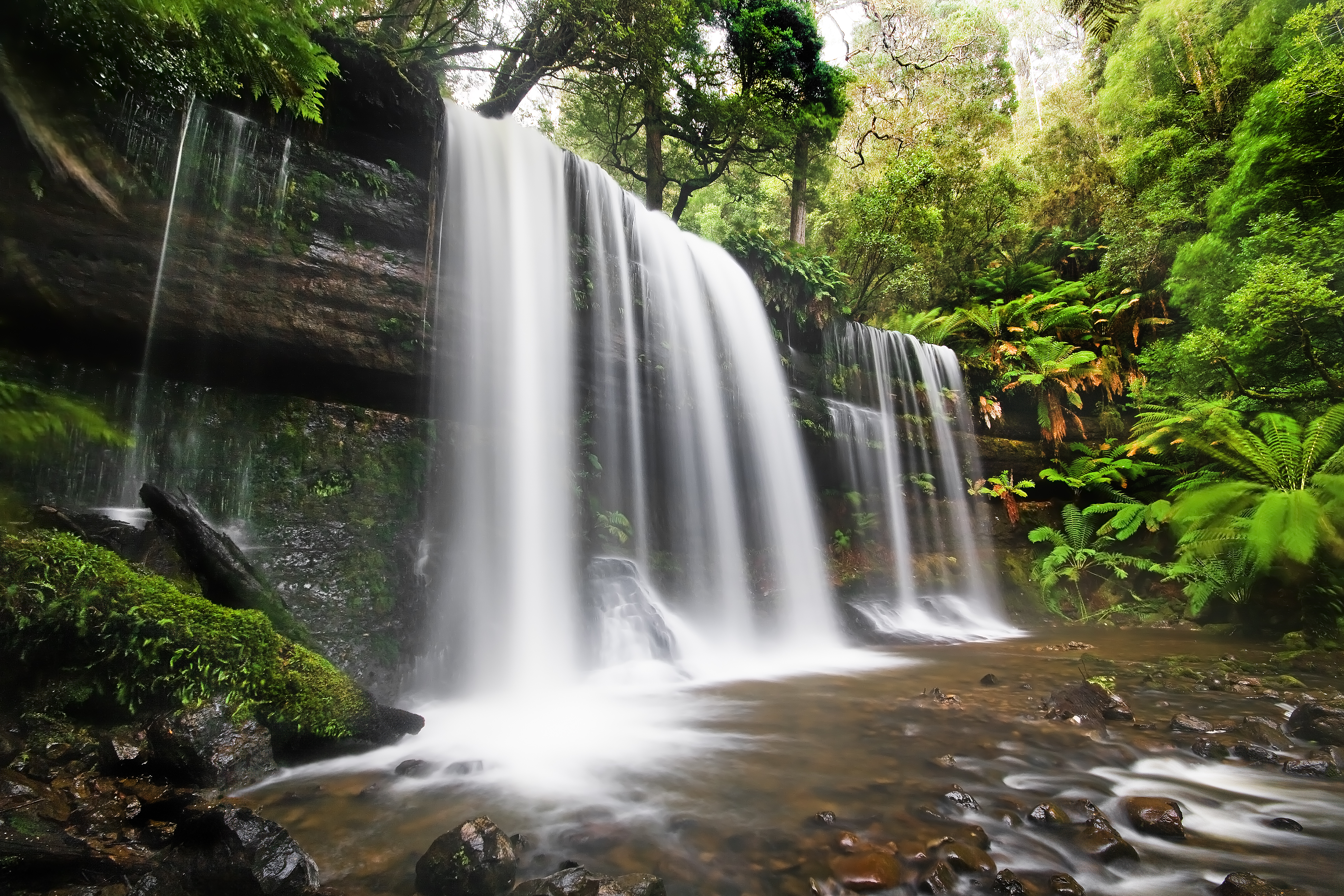
- Russell Falls

- Location within Tasmania
- Interactive map of Mount Field National Park
- Location: Tasmania
- Nearest city: Maydena
- Coordinates: 42°39′19″S 146°35′15″E
- Area: 162.65 km^{2} (62.80 sq mi)
- Established: 1916
- Governing body: Tasmania Parks and Wildlife Service
- Website: Official website

UNESCO World Heritage Site
- Criteria: Cultural: iii, iv, vi, vii; natural: viii, ix, x
- Reference: 181
- Inscription: 1982 (6th Session)

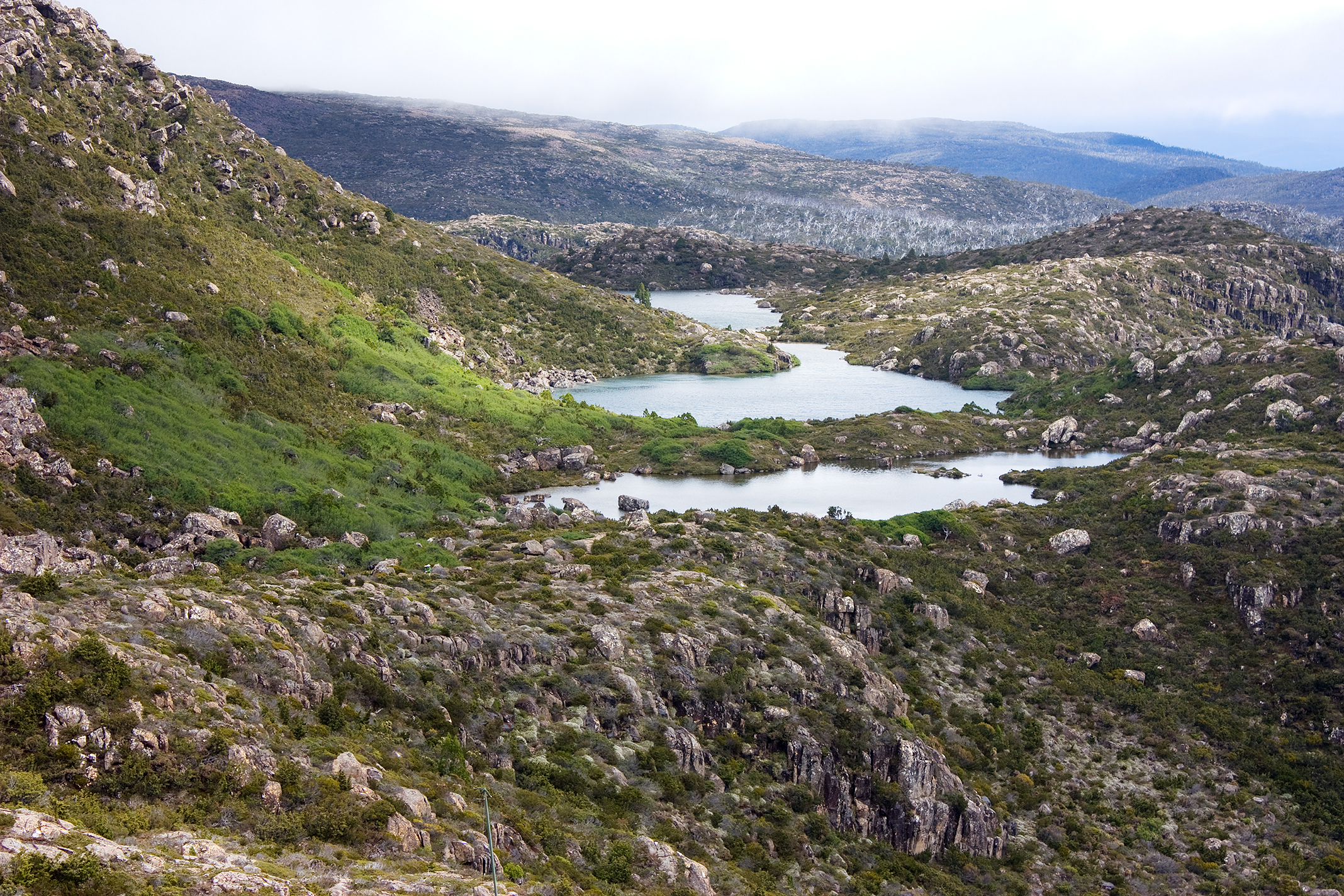
Robert Tarn, Mackenzie Tarn, and Johnston Tarn (foreground to background), Tarn Shelf

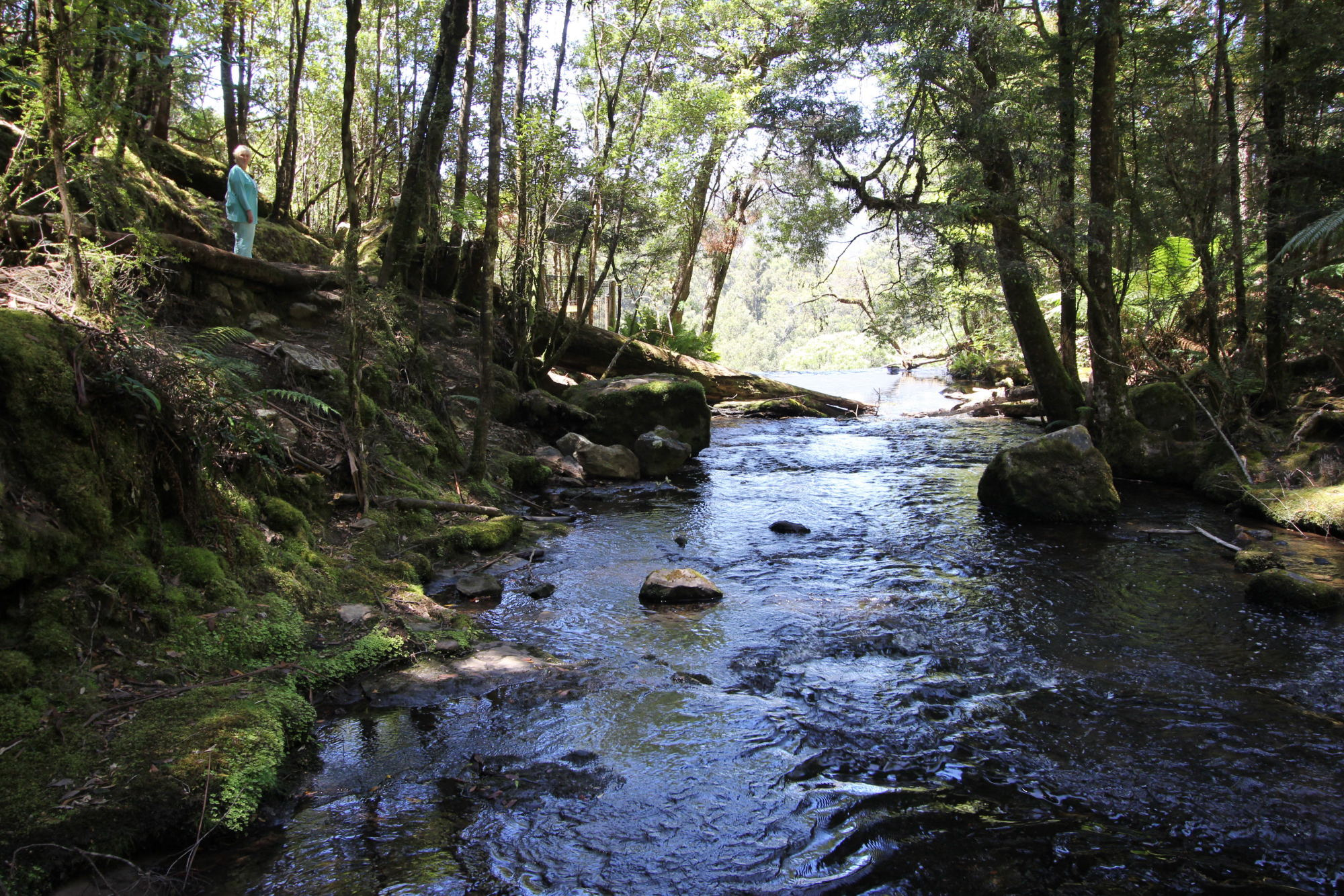
Russell Falls

Mount Field National Park is a national park in Tasmania, Australia, 64 km northwest of Hobart. The landscape ranges from eucalyptus temperate rainforest to alpine moorland, rising to 1,434 metres (4,705 ft) at the summit of Mount Field West.

== History ==
Mount Field National Park was founded in 1916, making it, along with Freycinet National Park, Tasmania's oldest national park.

The area around Russell Falls has been protected for its natural beauty since 1885, when it was set aside as Tasmania's first nature reserve. The last known wild thylacine was captured in the region in 1933. The reserve was called "National Park" before 1946, but was officially renamed to its present name in 1947.

In 1950, despite public opposition, the park's boundaries were altered through a special Act of Parliament, allowing its finest stand of mountain ash to be sold for conversion into paper pulp. The legislation was enacted by the government of Robert Cosgrove, then Premier of Tasmania.

== Etymology ==
Mount Field National Park was named for Judge Barron Field, who visited Tasmania as an itinerant judge in 1819 and 1821.

== Geology ==
During the Pleistocene epoch, a snowfield covered the top of the Mount Field plateau and fed glaciers in the surrounding valleys. A large, 12 km long glacier formed the broad river valley and the cirque walls above Lake Seal. Twisted Tarn, Twilight Tarn, and the tarns on the Tarn Shelf were formed by glacial scouring. A glacier flowed south from the Rodway Range, forming lakes Belcher and Belton, and north to form the Hayes Valley and Lake Hayes.

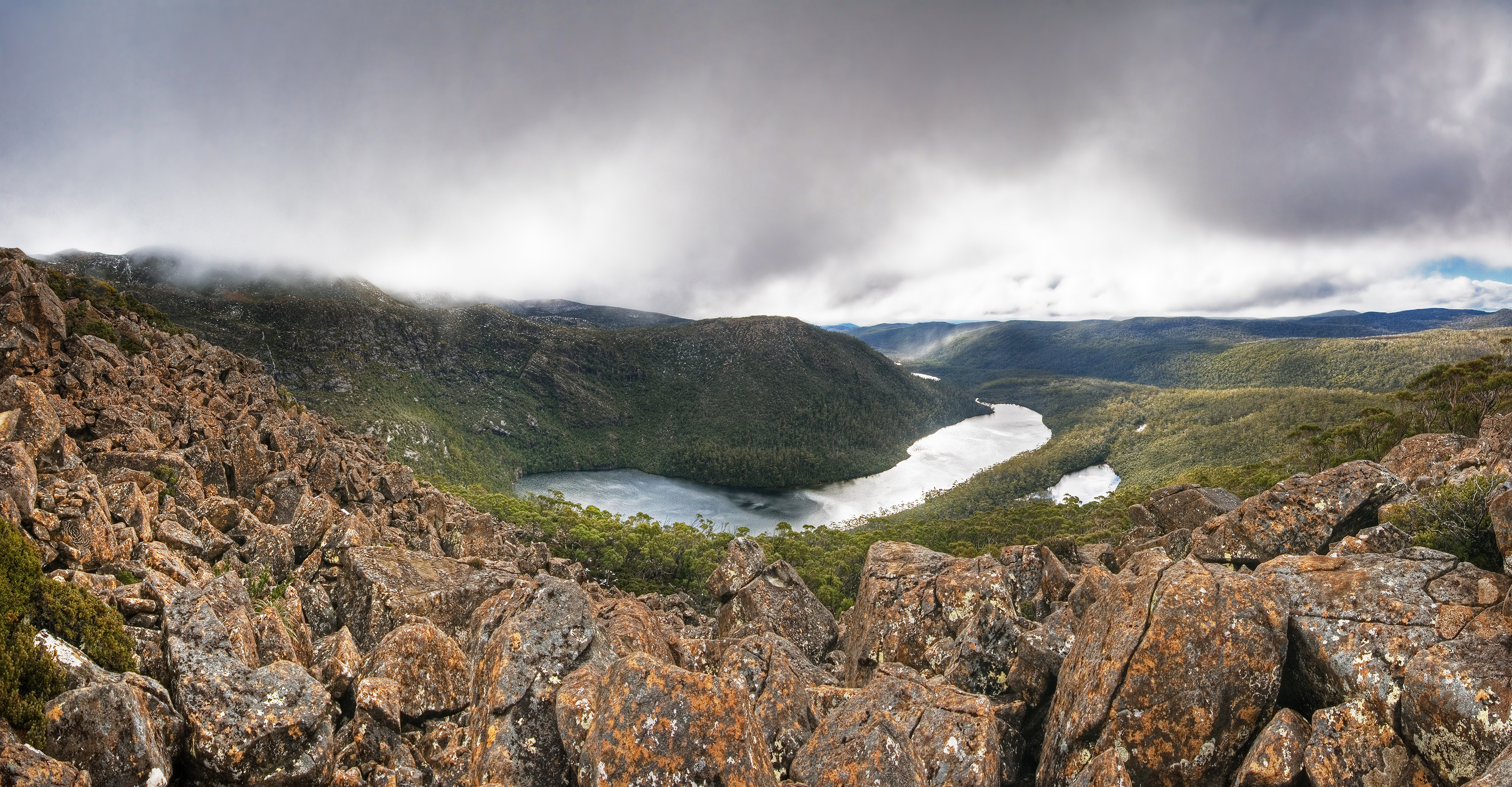
Lake Seal, Mount Field National Park. The remains of a cirque glacier are visible in the walls around Lake Seal.

In alpine areas podzolic, humus, and leached soils are most common. The podzols often occur on deep periglacial solifluction deposits down to 450 m. Alluvial floodplains have developed in the lower park on deposits of Quaternary alluvium.

== Fauna ==
The park has good representation of much of native Tasmanian fauna including wombats, platypuses, eastern barred bandicoots, echidnas, and the Tasmanian devil.

== Fungi ==
Mount Field National Park is also home to an enormous diversity of fungi. Fungi are ecologically important and megadiverse, yet their significance in underpinning the terrestrial ecology of the Park is little recognised.

While the Management Plan for Mt Field National Park only mentions fungi in the context of their destructive effects (Phytophthora cinnamomi and Chalara australis), the Park has a great variety of fungi that perform beneficial ecological roles. In fact, most fungi perform positive rather than negative roles. Even parasitic fungi – often regarded only negatively – are a vital part of healthy ecosystems, regulating ecosystem functions.

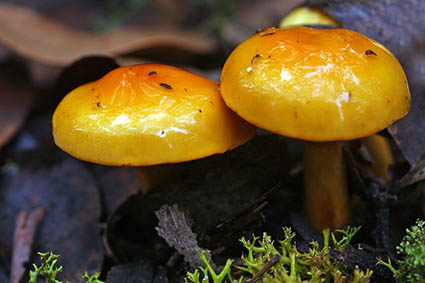
Cortinarius sinapicolor

As primary recyclers of organic matter, saprobic fungi break down fallen branches and leaf litter, making vital nutrients available to other organisms. Other fungi form symbiotic relationships with other organisms. Although rarely acknowledged, the great majority of plants in Mount Field National Park (indeed in the world) form mutually beneficial mycorrhizal relationships with fungi.

Given the great diversity of plants, specialist habitats and micro-climates in the park, a great diversity of fungi, including lichens, is also expected to occur there. Two hundred and eighty-nine species have already been recorded by field naturalists and interested individuals and a list can be found in the Atlas of Living Australia.

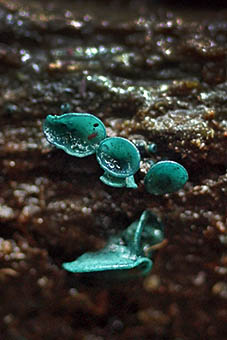
Chlorociboria aeruginascens group

The Green Elfcup (Chlorociboria aeruginascens group) is found growing on rotten wood in wetter parts of the park. Even when its fruitbodies are not conspicuous, its presence can often be detected by the blue-green staining of the wood it inhabits. The Slimy Yellow Cortinar (Cortinarius sinapicolor) is one of the more commonly encountered species that forms mycorrhizal relationships with various Eucalyptus species and is recognisable by its viscous sulphur-yellow fruit bodies. The Australian citizen-science organisation, Fungimap is documenting and mapping the distribution of fungi including those that occur in National Parks.

Despite their essential roles in supporting ecosystems, fungi are barely recognised as a vital part of Australia's biodiversity. Although Australia has national and state level biodiversity conservation strategies and has ratified international conventions, most overlook fungi, including Tasmania's Natural Heritage Strategy, which only makes one generic reference to fungi.

== Accommodation and facilities ==
There is camping, with powered and unpowered sites at the entrance to the Park, as well as the Government-owned Lake Dobson cabins near the end of the access road within the Park. Several private ski/walking clubs have private huts, and a ski-lodge on the ski slopes has limited accommodation during the skiing season.

The Visitor Centre located near the entrance to the Park houses an interpretive centre, cafe, gift shop, gallery and public toilets.

Beside the Visitor Centre there are picnic and barbecue facilities, as well as a playground and public toilets.

== Activities ==
From the visitor centre:

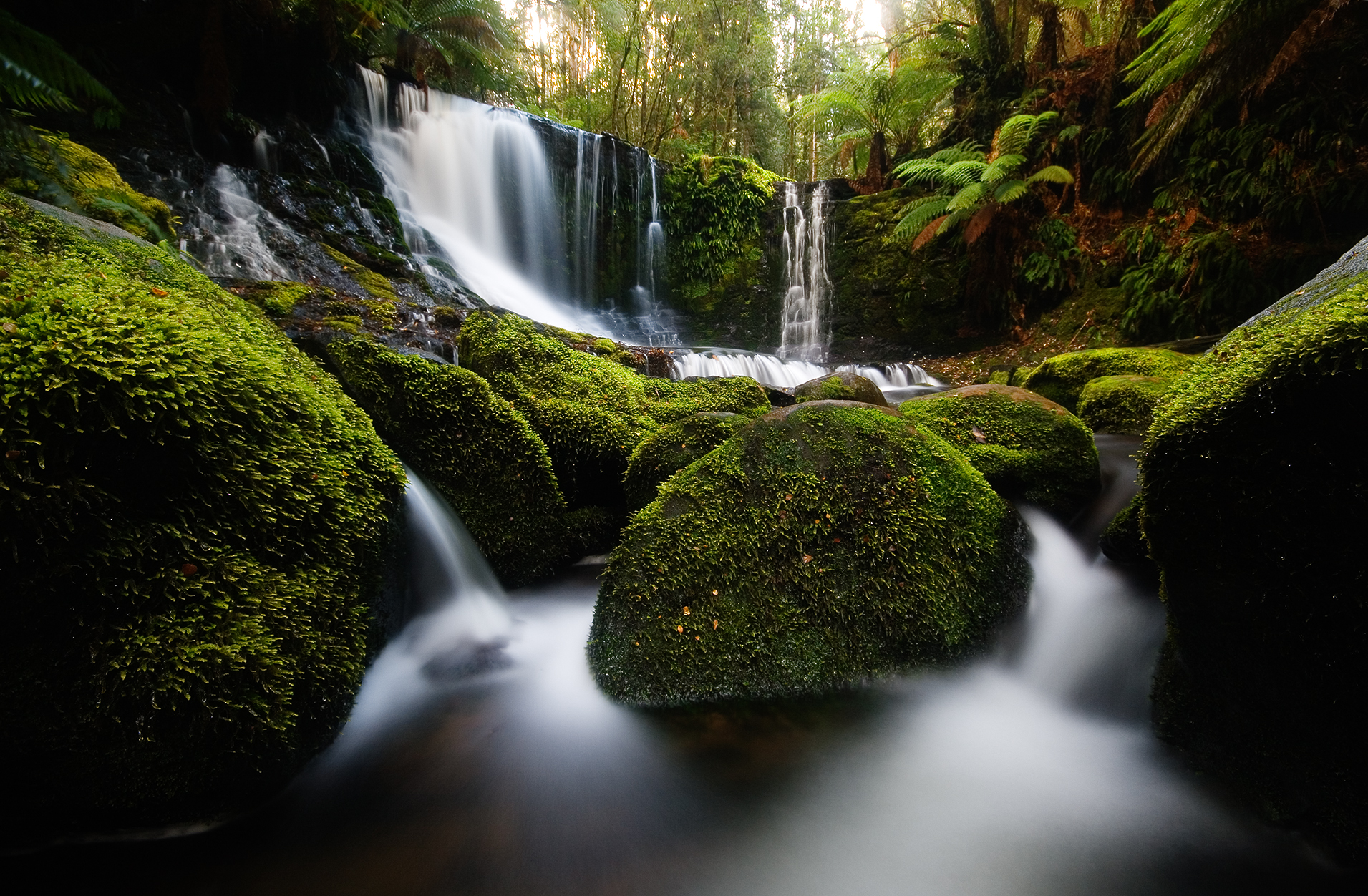
Horseshoe Falls at Mount Field National Park

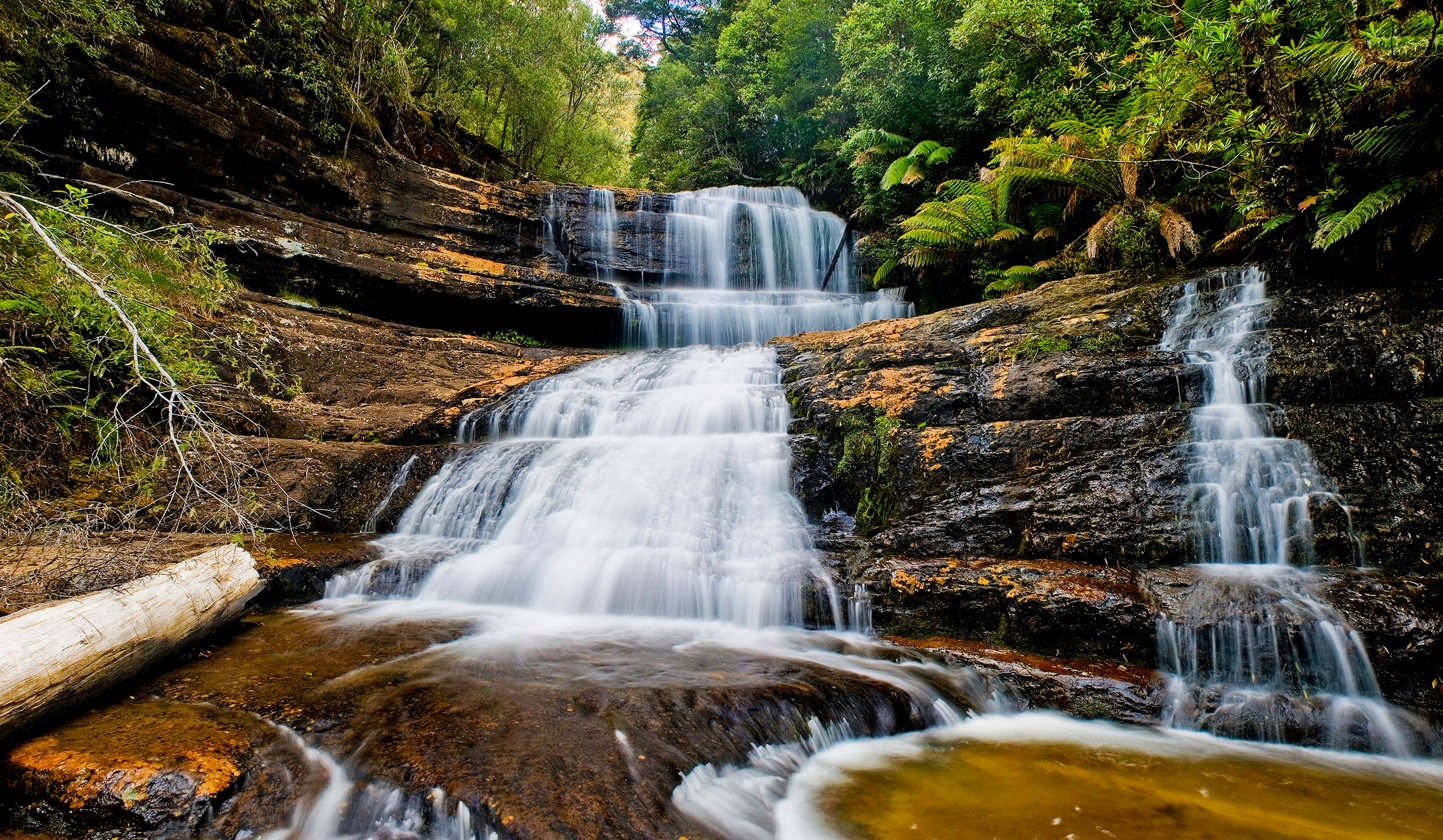
Lady Barron Falls at Mount Field National Park

- Russell Falls is an easy, 20-minute return walk on asphalt and boardwalks.
- Horseshoe Falls is a 30-minute walk.
- The Lady Barron Falls circuit (via Russell Falls and Horseshoe Falls) is approximately two hours return.
- Tall Trees Walk is an easy thirty-minute walk through the tall swamp gums.

Walks from the Lake Dobson car park include:

- The Ski Lodge and Lake Seal lookout, one hour return
- Seagers Lookout, two hours return
- Mount Field East via Lake Nicholls, five hours return
- Mount Field West, eight hours return
- Tarn Shelf, Lake Newdegate, Twilight Tarn and Lake Webster circuit, six hours return

Mount Field National Park has one of Tasmania's downhill skiing areas. There are three ski tows, two on Mount Mawson (named after geologist and Antarctic explorer Sir Douglas Mawson (Note: Verified by email from a representative of Registrar of Place Names, Land Tasmania, Department of Natural Resources and Environment Tasmania, 3 July 2025.)) and one on the Rodway Range. There is generally sufficient snow cover for skiing from mid July to mid September.

== See also ==
- Protected areas of Tasmania
- Mount Field (Tasmania)
