= National Trust of Western Australia =

Statutory authority in Western Australia

The National Trust of Western Australia, officially the National Trust of Australia (W.A.), is a statutory authority that delivers heritage services, including conservation and interpretation, on behalf of the Western Australian government and community. It is responsible for managing heritage properties and collections, as well as natural heritage management and education.

It was created in 1959, following the model of the National Trust in England. The trust became a statutory authority through the National Trust of Australia (W.A.) Act 1964, and is part of the National Trust of Australia, along with similar organisation for the other states and territories of Australia. As an organisation it was registering properties and localities before state heritage legislation was enabled in Western Australia, setting a framework and grounding for governmental preservation and conservation of heritage.

== Properties ==
The National Trust is custodian and owner of a range of historically significant properties:

- Anzac Cottage
- Avondale Farm
  - Avondale Farm Cottages
- Bridgedale
- Central Greenough
- Ellensbrook
- East Perth Cemeteries
- Golden Pipeline Heritage Trail
- Mangowine Homestead
- No 1 Pump Station - Mundaring Weir
- Old Blythewood
- Peninsula Farm - Maylands
- Samson House - Fremantle
- Strawberry Hill - Albany
- Warden Finnerty’s Residence - Coolgardie
- Wonnerup
- Woodbridge House - Woodbridge
- York Courthouse Complex - York

== Registration ==
A significant number of historic properties throughout Western Australia were registered by the Trust in the 1970s prior to later registrations by local government and state agencies - an example is Toodyay Court House, which was classified by the Trust on 7 June 1977 and included on the Shire of Toodyay's Municipal Heritage Inventory on 27 August 1998. On 14 February 2003 it was placed on the permanent state heritage register.

== See also ==
- Royal Western Australian Historical Society
- State Register of Heritage Places
- List of National Trust properties in Australia
