= Vanishing Falls (Tasmania) =

- Location within Tasmania
- Location: South West Tasmania, Australia
- Coordinates: 43°23′33″S 146°38′11″E
- Type: Ledge
- Elevation: 390m
- Total height: 70 metres (230 ft)
- Watercourse: Salisbury River

Vanishing Falls is a ledge waterfall in South West Tasmania, Australia that drains into a sinkhole. It is on the Salisbury River in the Southwest National Park.

== Description ==
At Vanishing Falls, the Salisbury River flows over a dolerite plateau underlain by limestone. The river flows over the edge of the dolerite sill and drains straight into a cave system in the limestone, a phenomenon attributed to karst processes. The above-ground channel downstream of the plunge pool flows only during floods.

The Salisbury River is a tributary of the New River.

== Access ==
The falls are surrounded by dense scrub and are located in remote wilderness, accordingly there are no designated trails leading to the falls.

== See also ==
- List of waterfalls of Tasmania
- Protected areas of Tasmania
