= Lady Barron Falls =

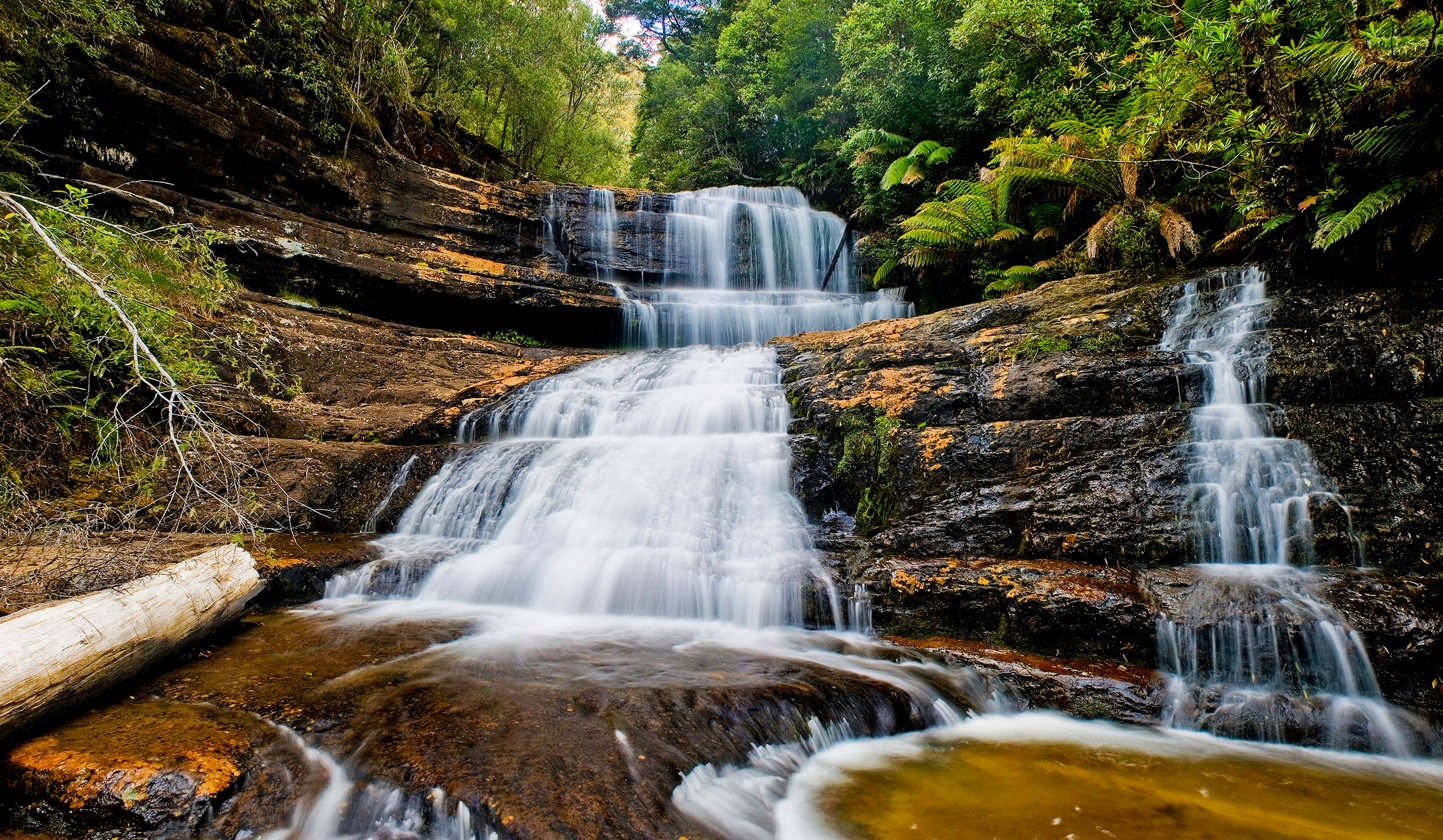
- Lady Barron Falls

- Location within Tasmania
- Location: Central Highlands, Tasmania, Australia
- Coordinates: 42°41′24″S 146°41′24″E
- Type: Tiered–cascade
- Watercourse: Lady Barron Creek

The Lady Barron Falls, a tiered–cascade waterfall on the Lady Barron Creek, is located in the Central Highlands region of Tasmania, Australia.

== Location and features ==
The Lady Barron Falls are situated in the Mount Field National Park, a short distance from Russell Falls, approximately 70 kilometres (43 mi) northwest of Hobart via the Brooker and Lyell highways; and are a popular tourist attraction. The waterfall descends over horizontal marine Permian siltstone benches, while the vertical faces of the falls are composed of resistant sandstone layers.

The waterfall is named in honour of Lady Clara Barron, the wife of Sir Harry Barron, a former Governor of Tasmania.

== See also ==
- List of waterfalls
- List of waterfalls in Australia
- Lady Barron, Tasmania, a small settlement on Flinders Island
