= James Peet =

James Thomas Peet (1862 – 26 August 1935) was a Western Australian property developer, and founder of the real estate company Peet Limited.

== Early life ==
Peet was born in Nottinghamshire, England, to Frederic Plowright Peet from St. Louis in the U.S., and Nottingham local Elizabeth Peet (née Hall). He was educated at Lord Rowland Hills Tenantry School, Hawkeston, Shropshire, and later Taunton's Endowed School, Southampton. After completing his studies, Peet became a surveyor and draftsman. He worked with the Ordnance Survey in Southampton, and did field work in Somerset and Devonshire.

== Work and businesses ==
Peet travelled to Australia in 1886, disembarking in Brisbane. He worked as a draughtsman for the Queensland Survey Department, in the Lands and Titles office. An economic boom in Victoria enticed Peet to move there, where he worked as a draftsman for Chaffey Bros in Mildura, and later become the manager of the Melbourne real estate firm F. Callaghan and Co. Peet became a business partner with architect Austin Bastow, and together they set up a firm, Peet and Bastow.

Two years later, in 1895, Peet came to Western Australia and started Peet and Co. Ltd, with an office on St Georges Terrace. He became a sworn valuator in 1898, and was appointed Government land agent the following year, a position he held until 1905. Peet was involved in subdividing much of Perth into estates in the early 20th century, including in High Wycombe, Kalamunda, Gooseberry Hill, Forrestfield, Maida Vale and Guildford. He also often valued properties resumed by the government, adjudicated rate disputes, and assessed fire damaged properties.

== Personal life ==
Peet married Mable Urch of "Boonooloo", Kalamunda, in 1896. They had five children – sons Cyril, Percy and Eric, and daughters Violet and Lily.

Peet was a member of the Freemasons, Oddfellows, and the Historic Society of Western Australia. Peet was also involved with the Boy Scout movement in Western Australia, the YMCA, and was a trustee of Trinity Church for several years. Other interests included cycling (Peet co-founded the Fitzroy Cycle Club, horse riding, music (he was a founder of the Melbourne Amateur Opera Club in 1893) and horticulture.

During World War I Peet had an active role in the West Australian Sandbag Fund. He also donated the land in Mount Hawthorn upon which, in 1916, volunteers built Anzac Cottage for the district's first war veteran to return home.

Peet died on 26 August 1935 in a private hospital in Mount Lawley, after suffering from a short illness. His funeral was held the next day, with a service in Trinity Church. He was interred in the Congregational section of Karrakatta Cemetery.

== Legacy ==
Peet's company Peet Limited became one of Australia's oldest property companies, with operations expanding to the eastern states of Australia.

Peet was recognised as one of the most influential Western Australian businesspeople in The West Australian's 2013 list of the 100 most influential.

== See also ==
- Lindsay Peet – grandson
