= Anzac Cottage =

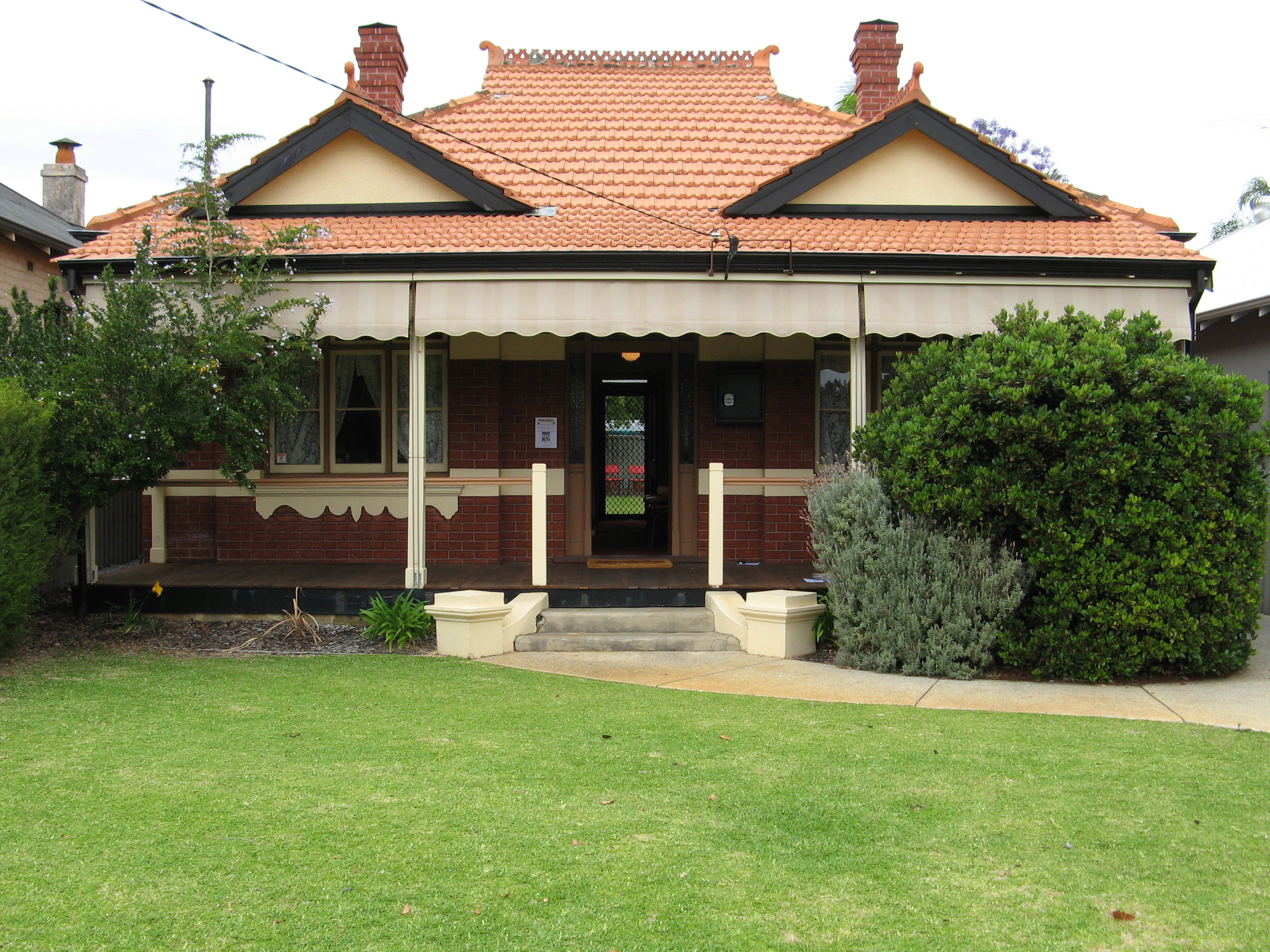
- Interactive map of the Anzac Cottage area
- Etymology: Australian and New Zealand Army Corps

General information
- Architectural style: Federation Queen Anne
- Location: 38 Kalgoorlie St, Mount Hawthorn, Western Australia
- Coordinates: 31.9235°S 115.8347°E
- Current tenants: National Trust of Western Australia
- Groundbreaking: 29 January 1916
- Construction started: 5 February 1916
- Completed: March 1916
- Opened: 15 April 1916
- Owner: National Trust of Western Australia

Design and construction
- Architect: Alfred Levido

Western Australia Heritage Register
- Designated: 20 October 2000
- Reference no.: 3344

Anzac Cottage is a house in the suburb of Mount Hawthorn, Western Australia that was built as both a memorial to the soldiers who died in the Gallipoli Campaign and as a home for one of the wounded returning men. It is notable for being the first World War I memorial built in Western Australia, and for (nominally (Note: The cottage is typically described as having been built in a single day. However the foundations were laid over two days of the previous weekend, and some of the construction work, including the interior, was "completed ... during the next week or two".)) being built in a single day (12 February 1916) with donated funds, materials and labour.

== Description ==
The cottage is a four-room, (Note: Lounge room, two bedrooms, dining room/kitchen.) brick and tile building, designed by Alfred Levido, a Perth architect. It was designed in Federation Queen Anne style. The roof has two finialed gables. A verandah extends across the entire width of the front.

The front rooms have triple bay windows. Above the front door are ornamental leadlight panels, the centre one of which includes the word "ANZAC". The building has pressed metal ceilings. The two front rooms and the kitchen/dining room have fireplaces.

The rear of the cottage has a verandah, with kitchen, bathroom and laundry, the locations of which have changed over the years. The original washhouse has been removed, but the concrete slab remains to show its location (about 6 m (20 ft) from the verandah). The original outhouse is no longer there.

A flag pole stands in the front yard.

== History ==
=== Construction ===
In late 1915 the Mount Hawthorn Progress Association decided to build a house named Anzac Cottage, as both a memorial "to perpetuate the name of 'Anzac'" and to provide a home for a soldier wounded in the landing at Anzac Cove.

The land was donated by a local real estate agent, James Peet. The 40 by 132 ft (12 by 40 m) heavily timbered block was cleared by about 30 volunteers using hand tools on 29 January 1916.

The following week, on 5 February, materials were brought to the site. Seventy drays and 150 men proceeded in a 800-metre-long (1/2 mi) convoy from James Street to the Mount Hawthorn building site. The procession was led by Emily Roberts, (Note: Emily Roberts née Huxley was the wife of Charles McDonald Roberts. As was the custom at the time, most contemporary reports refer to her by her husband's name or initial(s), e.g. Mrs C Roberts or Mrs Charles Roberts. She won the title "Soldiers' Queen" in a fund-raising Queen Carnival, and was subsequently well-known for her ongoing charitable work and assistance to returned soldiers.) the "Soldiers' Queen", in her motor car. On arrival at the building site, Roberts ceremonially turned the first sod before the men began the foundation work, completing them the next day.

Construction day, Saturday 12 February, began at 3:30 am with the ringing of a bell to summon the builders. By 4 am there were 50 men on site ready to begin, and by 8 am over there were over 100 men working on the house. The number rose to 200 by early afternoon. Meals were provided to the workers from a temporary canteen set up for the purpose. During the afternoon a memorial plaque was affixed to one of the gateway pillars by Lady Clara Barron, the wife of Governor Harry Barron. (Note: The original plaque was replaced in 2002 by one laid by Lorraine Sanderson, wife of Governor John Sanderson.) At 5 pm Roberts raised the Australian flag, into which the letters "ANZAC" had been sewn. By the end of the day "the outside of the buildings was almost completed", the lawn turf was laid and the fence had been erected. The remainder of the construction work, including the interior, was completed over the next two weeks.

The building of the cottage was a notable public event. The delivery procession was watched by thousands, and met at the building site by a crowd of hundreds. The main construction attracted a crowd of 4,000 onlookers, the local streets were decorated with flags and streamers, and the Police Band provided music. A souvenir booklet was printed to mark the occasion, with descriptions of the events and the cottage, photographs, and the names of many of those involved.

=== Porter family residence ===
On 15 April 1916 the cottage was officially opened for public inspection by Premier John Scaddan and his wife. The following day the property was handed over to Private John Porter (Note: Some sources list alternative names (including spelling): Cuthburt John Porter, Cuthbert John Porter, Cuthbert Porter, John Cuthbert Porter.) and his wife Annie. Porter was a member of the 11th Battalion of the First Australian Imperial Force, and one of those in the landing at Anzac Cove on 25 April 1915. He was wounded on the first day; the injury subsequently causing him to return to Australia in July 1915 as an invalid.

The title deed to the property was held by the Mount Hawthorn Progress Association as trustees, with the returned soldier and his family and descendants having the right to live there, but not to sell it.

Porter and his wife lived in the cottage until their deaths in the 1960s. Some of his descendants lived in the cottage until the 1970s or early 1980s.

=== Restoration and subsequent use ===
During the 1970s and 1980s ownership of the property and responsibility for its maintenance was disputed. The Porters' children had moved elsewhere and the nominal owner, the Mount Hawthorn Progress Association was no longer operating. After legal disputes as to its ownership, the cottage was eventually taken over by the state government. By this time the building was in poor condition.

In the early 1990s, the cottage was given to the Vietnam Veterans Association of Australia, Western Australia Branch (VVAA WA), (Note: In 1989 the government had offered it to the Returned and Services League of Australia, who declined it.) who coordinated the restoration of the building to its original condition, with support from local community groups and funding from Lotterywest. A sleepout extension and bath, both non-original, were removed. The front verandah, extensively damaged by weather and termites, was replaced. Sections of the roof and brick work was repaired. The cottage was reopened in April 1997. In April 2002 a rededication ceremony was held, at which Lorraine Sanderson (the wife of Governor John Sanderson) laid a new memorial plaque to replace the original laid by Lady Barron.

In 2006 the cottage was donated to the Town of Vincent, who leased it back to the VVAA WA for a peppercorn rent. The VVAA used it as their headquarters and a museum, occasionally open to the public.

In 2021 Anzac Cottage was transferred from the City of Vincent to the National Trust of Western Australia, who run guided tours of the building.

=== Flagpole ===
A flagpole was erected in the front yard of the cottage before its official opening in April 1916. It was donated by Mrs Helmes, in memory of her nephew killed at Anzac. A plaque was attached to the flagpole, commemorating Private Leslie Arthur Wilkinson, who died at Anzac Cove.

In 2015 the wooden flagpole was found to be irreparably damaged by termites. A new metal flagpole was installed to replace it. The new pole has a new plaque, with the same wording as the original.

== Heritage listings ==
Anzac Cottage is classified by the National Trust of Australia, listed by the Heritage Council of Western Australia on the State Register of Heritage Places and included on the Register of the National Estate. It is included in the City of Vincent Municipal Heritage Inventory.

== Commemorative ceremonies ==
Anzac Cottage is host to several commemorative ceremonies, such as those on Anzac Day, Vietnam Veterans Day, and Remembrance Day. Notable amongst these are:

- Every year Porter raised the flag on Anzac Day at 4:30 am, the time of the first landing.
- Since 1996, a "sunset service" has been held each Anzac Day at the cottage, the last such service in Australia each year.

== Other similar cottages ==
The Mount Hawthorn cottage inspired other similar ventures, such as the Anzac Cottage in Claremont, Western Australia, built by the Ugly Men's Association in 1917.

The Queensland War Council built several dozen "Anzac cottages" for widows and orphans of Queensland soldiers who died during the war.
