= Horseshoe Falls (Tasmania) =

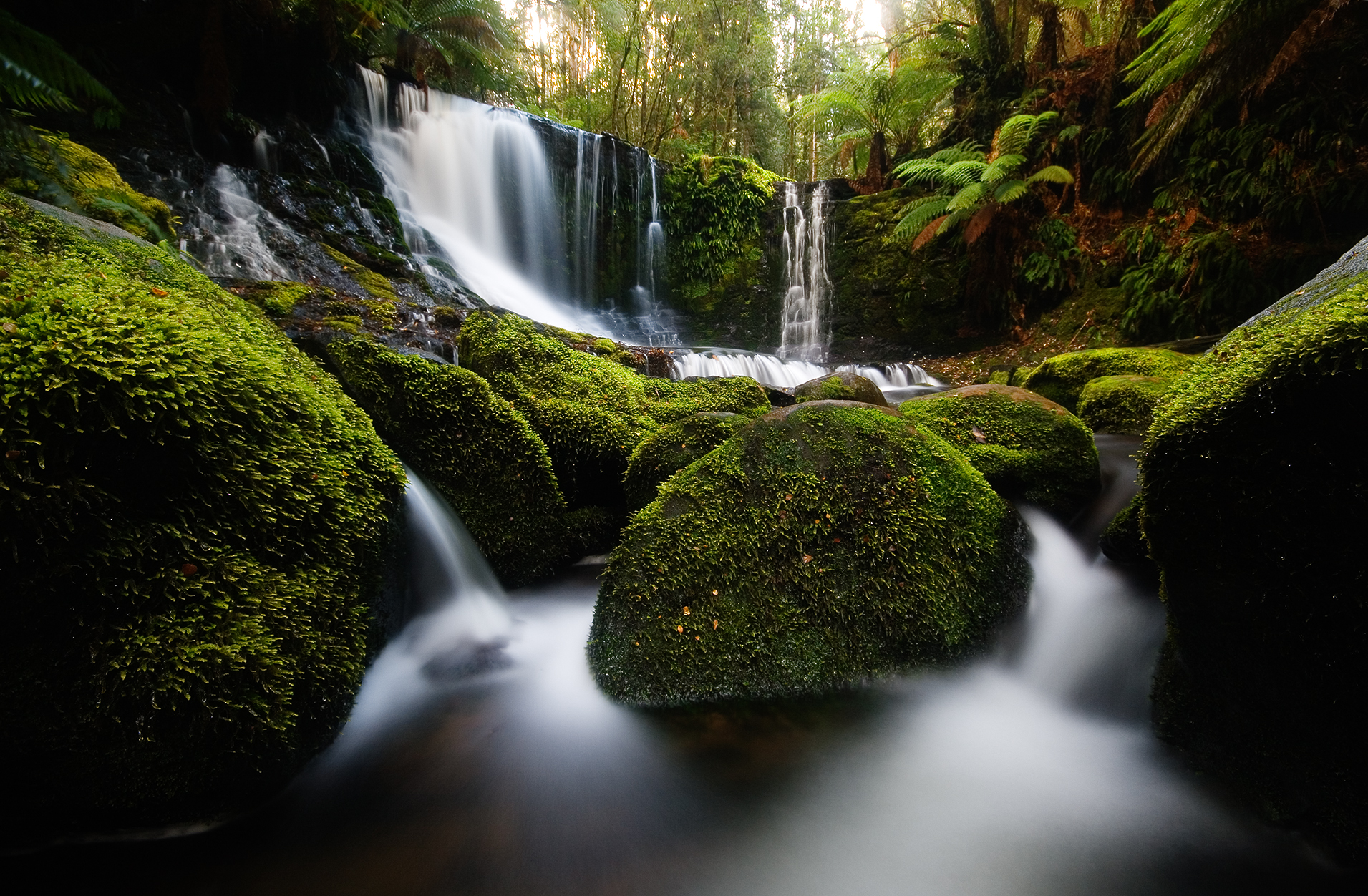
- Horseshoe Falls, in 2009.

- Location within Tasmania
- Location: Mount Field National Park, Tasmania, Australia
- Coordinates: 42°40′12″S 146°42′36″E
- Type: Tiered–cascade

The Horseshoe Falls, a tiered–cascade waterfall, is located in Mount Field National Park, Tasmania, Australia.

== Location and features ==
The Horseshoe Falls are situated in the Mount Field National Park, 100 metres (330 ft) upstream of Russell Falls, approximately 70 kilometres (43 mi) northwest of Hobart via the Brooker Highway to New Norfolk and are a popular tourist attraction. The waterfall descends over horizontal marine Permian siltstone benches, while the vertical faces of the falls are composed of resistant sandstone layers.

== Gallery ==
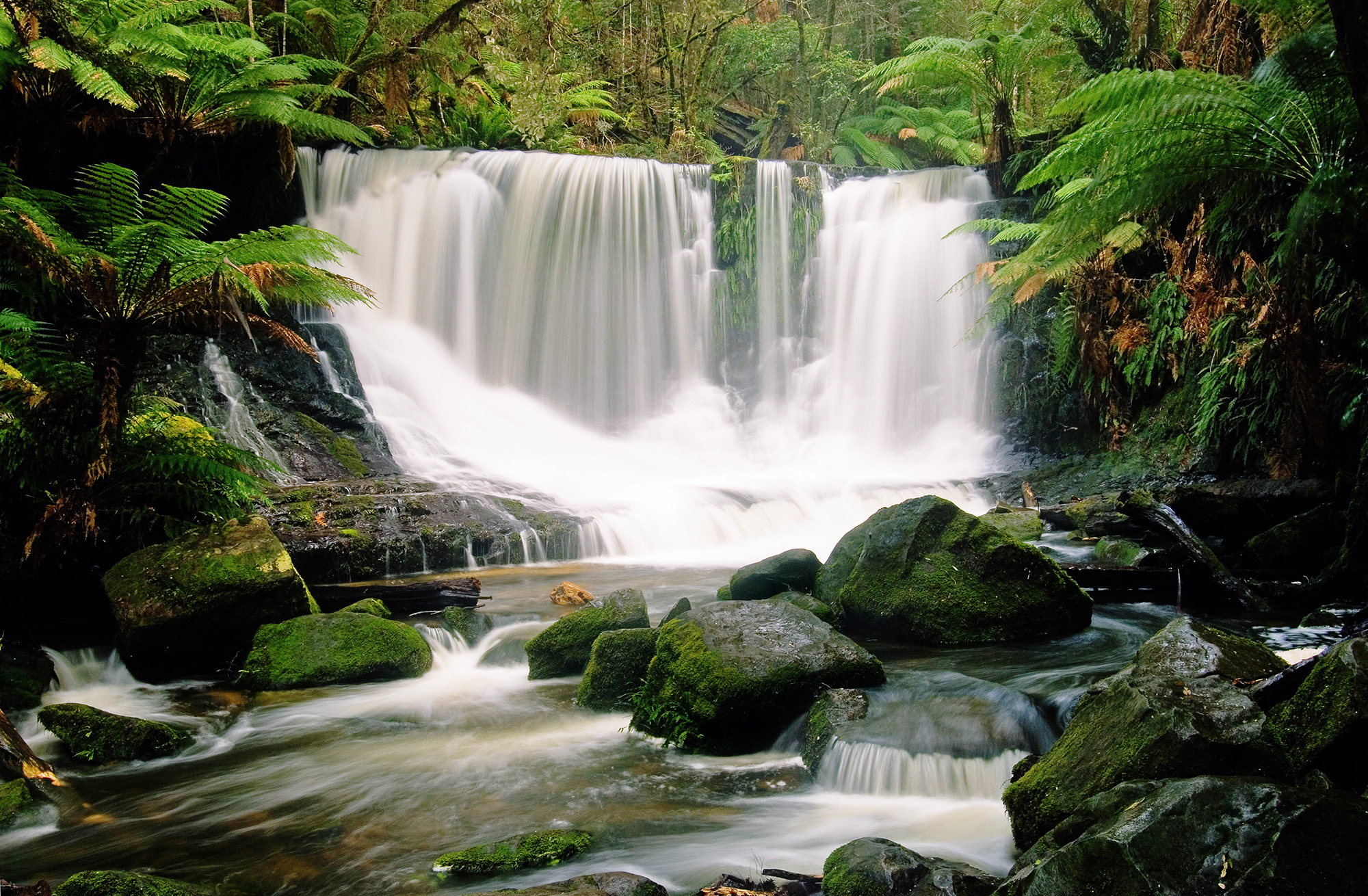
Horseshoe Falls

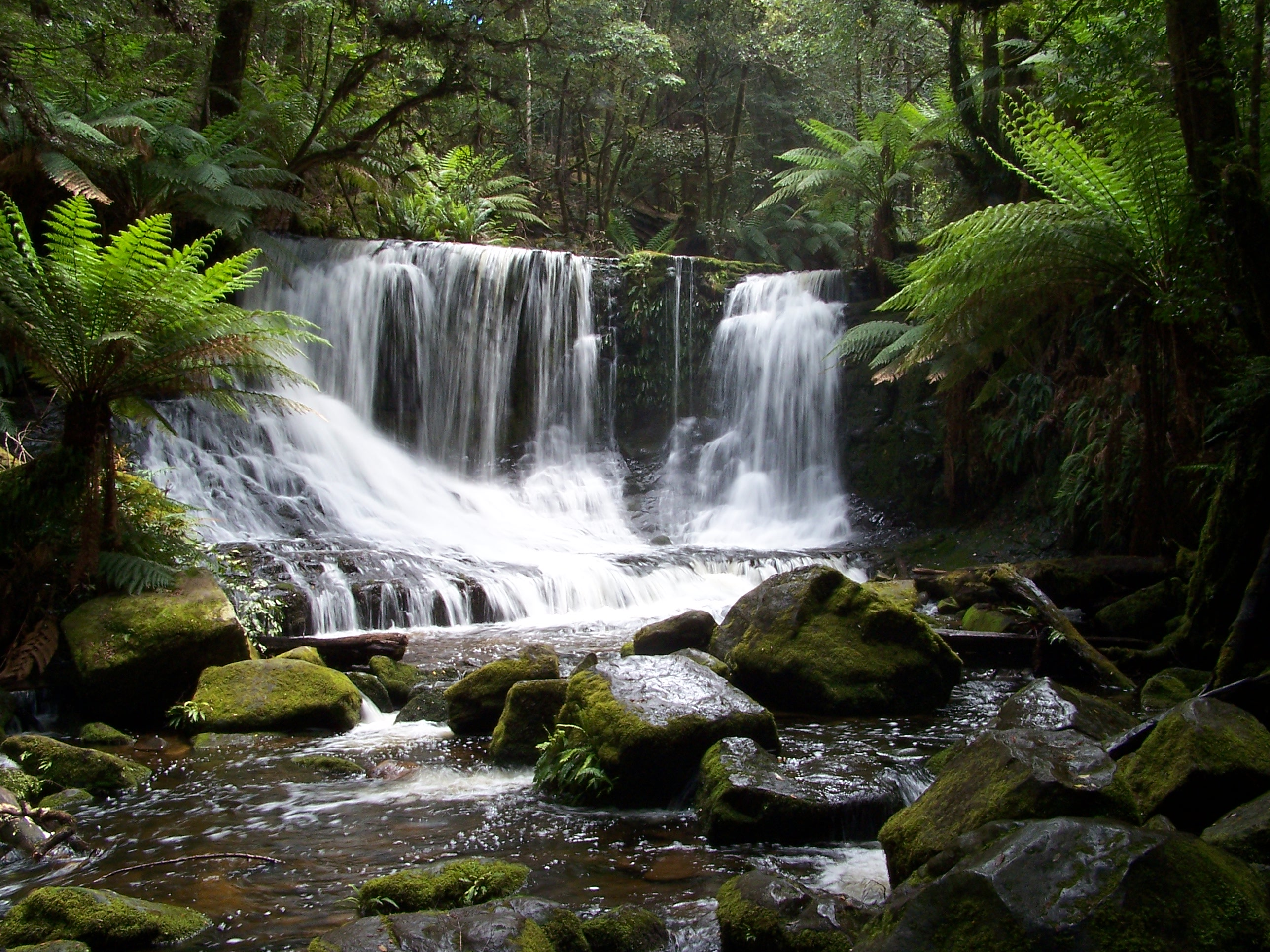
Horseshoe Falls

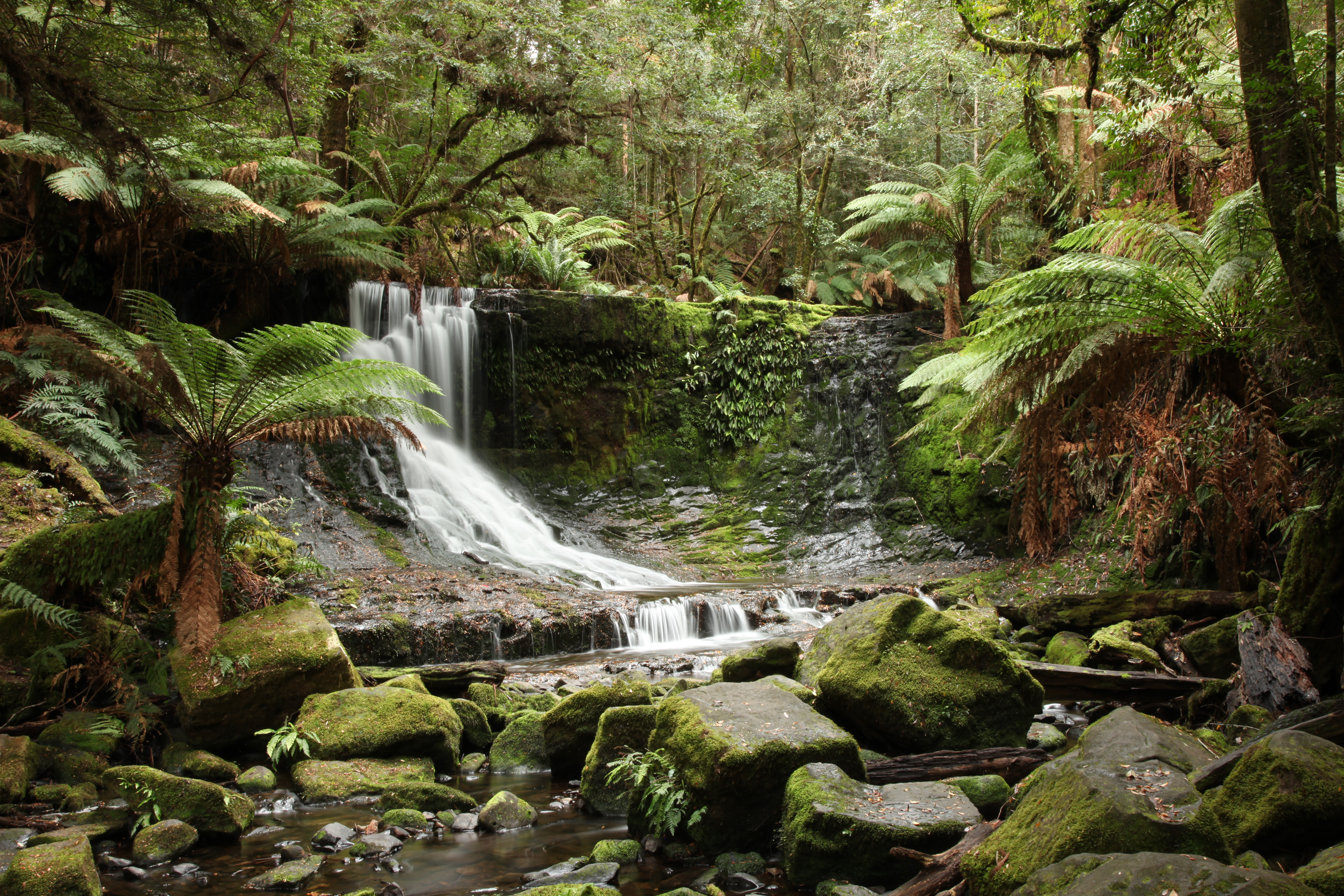
Horseshoe Falls

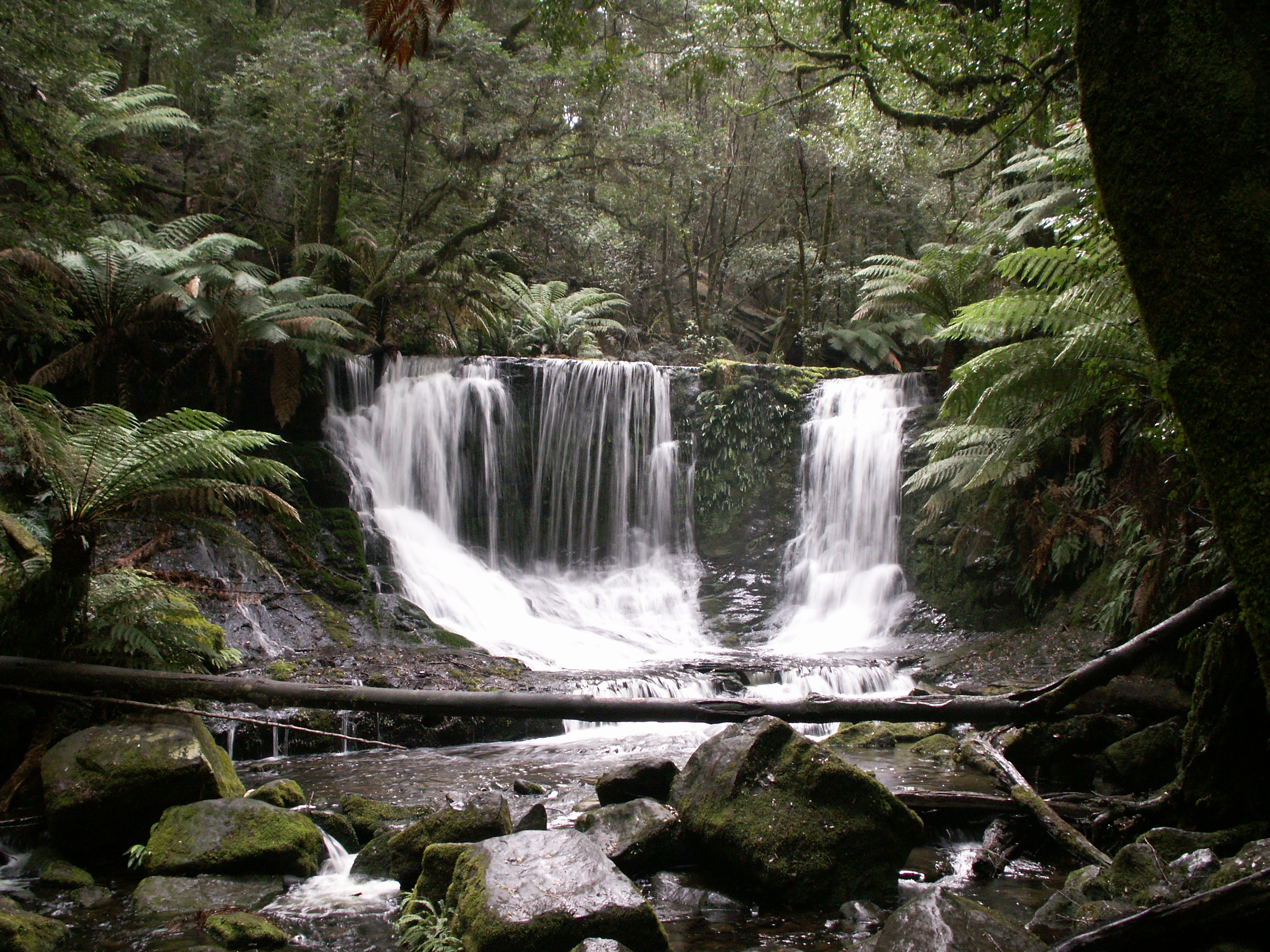
Horseshoe Falls

== See also ==
- List of waterfalls
- List of waterfalls in Australia
