= Peet Limited =

Australian real estate development company

- Traded as: ASX: PPC
- Industry: Real estate
- Founded: 1895
- Headquarters: Perth, Australia
- Operating income: $37 million (2024)
- Website: www.peet.com.au

Peet Limited (ASX: PPC) is an Australian real estate development company focused on creating masterplanned residential communities and medium density and apartment developments for homebuyers across Australia.

Headquartered in Perth, it has operations in all Mainland Australia states and territories.

== History ==
Peet was founded in 1895 as Peet & Bastow by James Peet. James Peet was a surveyor and draughtsman who left England for Australia in 1888. After a short time in Queensland, he moved to Victoria where he established a real estate partnership with architect Austin Bastow in Melbourne. In the early 1890s Peet and Bastow turned their attention west, and in 1895 James Peet moved to Western Australia and established Peet & Company Ltd.^{3}

In the late 1990s Peet and Co bought its first property in Victoria. In 2002, the company continued its eastern expansion buying its first property in Queensland. In 2004, Peet purchased its first piece of land in New South Wales and in August of that year listed on the Australian Securities Exchange later in the same year.

In 2006, the company changed its name from Peet & Co to Peet Limited.

In 2015, Peet Limited finalised the full acquisition of property group CIC Australia which expanded the company's reach to all mainland Australian states and territories.^{5}

In 2025 the company distanced itself from Hugo Lennon, the grandson of former chairman Tony Lennon and son of non-executive director Anthony Lennon by denouncing the "March for Australia" rallies: “Creating inclusive, diverse communities where everyone belongs is a core value for Peet. Peet does not share the views expressed by this individual, and we do not condone his [Hugo Lennon’s] actions or commentary.”

== Business ==
The Peet Group is involved in four main areas of the property development industry:

- Development of residential land estates.
- Development of completed homes, medium density townhouses and apartments.
- Development of commercial property such as shopping centre and community facilities.
- Provision of property investment options in residential communities and masterplanned communities via land syndication.

Peet has one of the biggest residential landbanks of any ASX listed property group with a gross development value of approximately $14 billion (AUD).^{7} As at 30 June 2018, the Group managed and marketed a land bank of more than 49,000 lots in the growth corridors of major mainland Australian cities.^{8}

The Peet Group develops, manages and markets more than 60 projects, either as owned projects or in partnership with private and public sector. It has more than 70 industry awards for urban planning and design, environmental management, community development and affordability.^{9}

Peet pioneered retail land syndication in Australia. Peet's Funds Management division manages more than 20 syndicates.^{10}
