= Russell Falls =

Waterfall in Tasmania, Australia

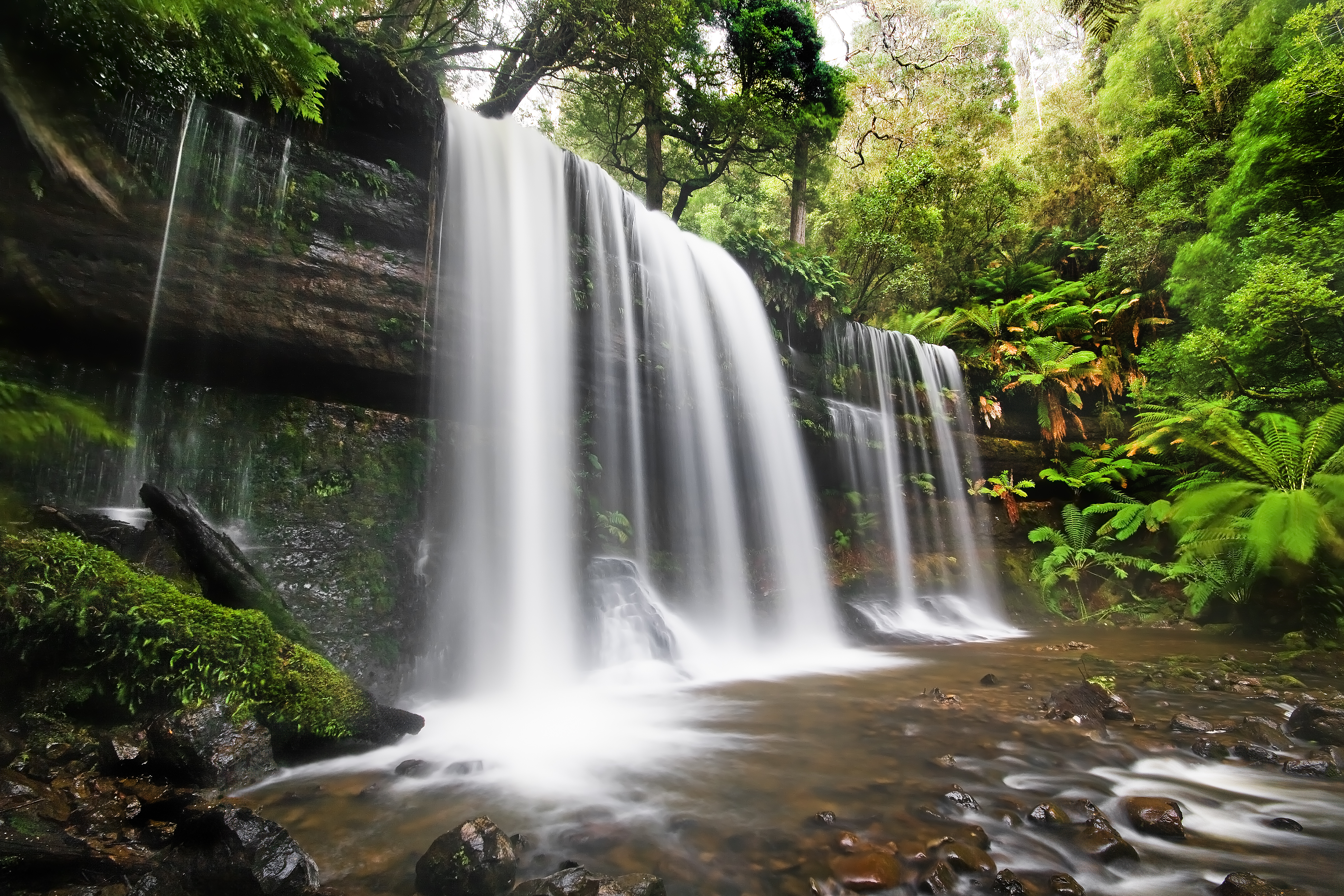
- Lower curtain of Russell Falls

- Location within Tasmania
- Location: Central Highlands, Tasmania, Australia
- Coordinates: 42°40′12″S 146°42′36″E
- Type: Tiered–cascade
- Elevation: 295 metres (968 ft)
- Total height: 34–58 metres (112–190 ft)
- Number of drops: 2
- Watercourse: Russell Falls Creek

The Russell Falls, a tiered–cascade waterfall on the Russell Falls Creek, is located in the Central Highlands region of Tasmania, Australia.

== Location and features ==
The Russell Falls are situated on the eastern boundary of Mount Field National Park, 100 metres (330 ft) downstream of the Horseshoe Falls, approximately 70 kilometres (43 mi) northwest of Hobart via the Brooker and Lyell highways. Accessible by a paved walking track, the falls are a popular tourist attraction. The waterfall descends over horizontal marine Permian siltstone benches, while the vertical faces of the falls are composed of resistant sandstone layers.

They were first named the Brownings Falls after the original discoverer, circa 1856, but were known as the Russell Falls after 1884, by which time they were already a popular tourist attraction. The Falls Reserve was established in 1885 and in 1899 the Russell Falls were selected as one of eight images to be used on a set of pictorial postage stamps, aimed at promoting the then colony's growing tourist industry.

== Gallery ==
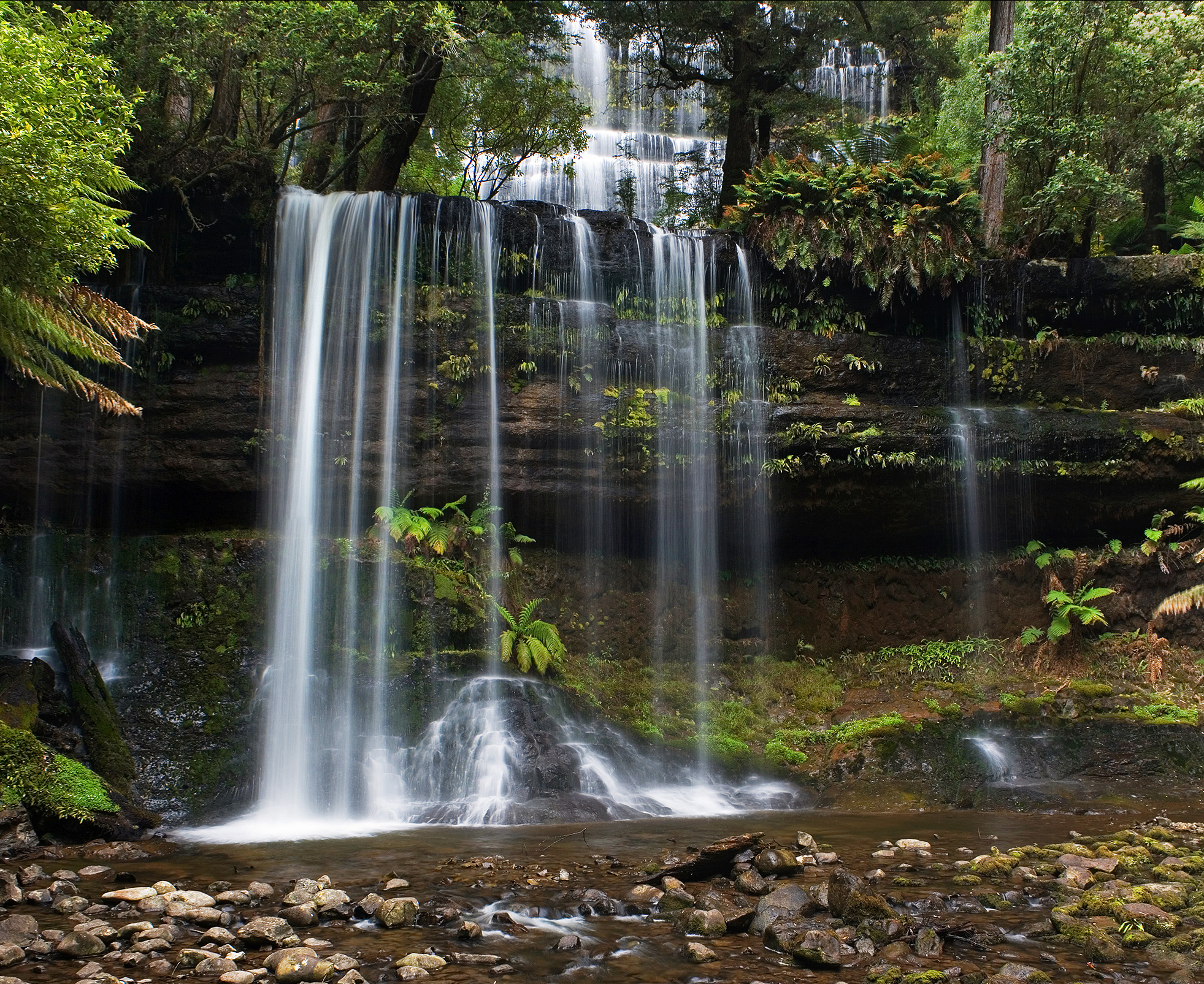
Lower curtain of Russell Falls with upper tiers visible at top of image

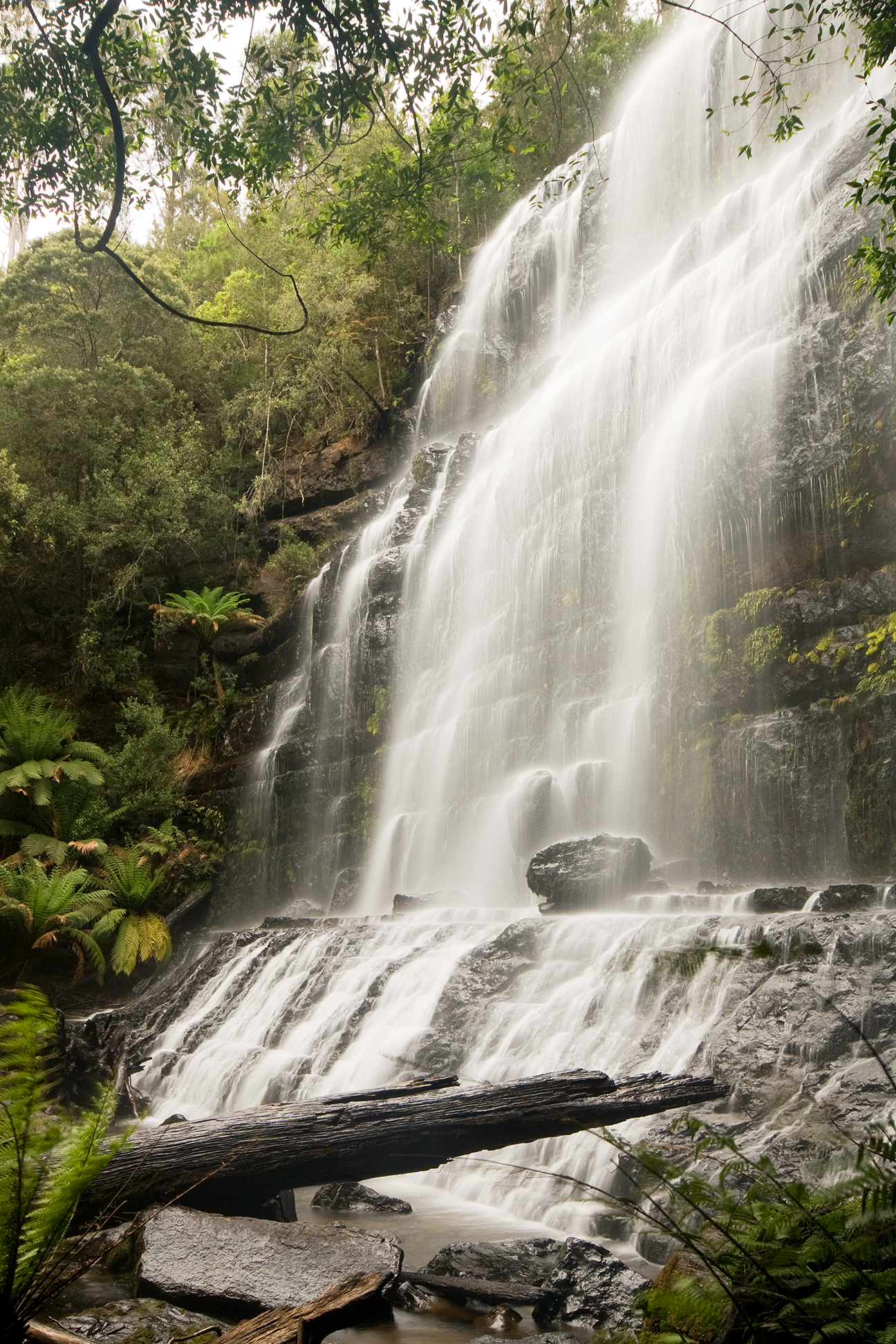
The upper tier of Russell Falls

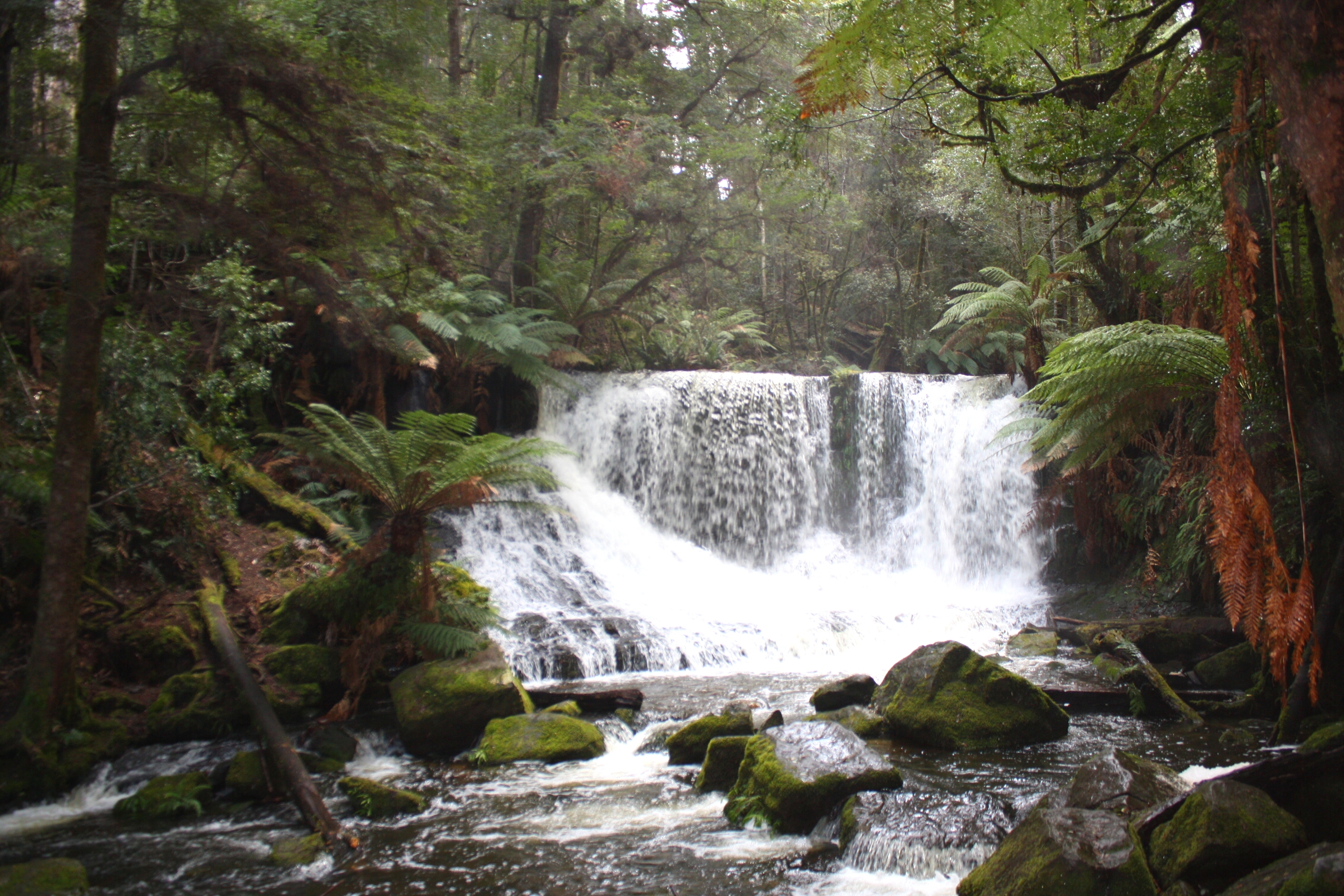
Upper level waterfall

== See also ==
- List of waterfalls
- List of waterfalls in Australia
