= Madsen Falls =

Waterfall in Victoria, Australia

- Location within Victoria
- Location: Lavers Hill, Victoria, Australia
- Coordinates: 38°41′53″S 143°22′10″E
- Type: Plunge
- Total height: 6.05 m (19.8 ft)
- Number of drops: 1
- Watercourse: (Unnamed creek)

Madsen Falls is a waterfall located within the Melba Gully State Park in the Otway Ranges of Victoria, Australia. Situated on an unnamed creek that flows into the Johanna River, the waterfall is composed of a single drop at a total height of 6.05 metres (19.8 ft).

== Description and access ==
The waterfall is named after Axel Madsen (1907–1986). Born in Egtved, Denmark, he and his Colac-born wife Annie Olive Madsen (née Hobson) initially owned the land surrounding Melba Gully until 1975, when they donated it to the Victorian Conservation Trust.

Whilst close in proximity to the Melba Gully car park and the start of the Melba Gully loop walking track, there is no path to the waterfall, and access is via walking through the bush.

== See also ==
- Annes Cascade
- Allambee Beek Falls
- Galliebarinda Falls
- Carisbrook Falls
- Swallow Cave Falls
- Erskine Falls
- Sheoak Falls
- Lower Kalimna Falls
