= Annes Cascade =

Waterfall in Victoria, Australia

- Annes Cascade

- Location within Victoria
- Location: Lavers Hill, Victoria, Australia
- Coordinates: 38°41′41″S 143°22′18″E
- Type: Plunge
- Total height: 3.14 m (10.3 ft)
- Number of drops: 1
- Watercourse: Johanna River

Annes Cascade is a small waterfall located within the Melba Gully State Park, in the Otway Ranges of Victoria, Australia. The waterfall, situated in the headwaters of the Johanna River, is composed of a single tier with a height of 3.14 metres (10.3 ft).

== Description and access ==
The waterfall is named after Annie Olive Madsen (née Hobson) (1914–2009) who, alongside her Danish-born husband Axel Madsen, donated the land in which the waterfall and state park are located to the Victorian Conservation Trust in 1975.

The waterfall can be accessed via the Melba Gully loop walking track, which can be directly accessed from the Great Ocean Road.

== See also ==
- Allambee Beek Falls
- Galliebarinda Falls
- Carisbrook Falls
- Madsen Falls
- Swallow Cave Falls
- Erskine Falls
- Sheoak Falls
- Lower Kalimna Falls
