= Upper Johanna Falls =

Waterfall in Victoria, Australia

- Location within Victoria
- Location: Johanna, Victoria, Australia
- Coordinates: 38°44′25″S 143°21′55″E
- Type: Plunge
- Total height: 28.54 m (93.6 ft)
- Number of drops: 2
- Watercourse: Johanna River

Upper Johanna Falls is a waterfall located in the Otway Ranges of Victoria, Australia. Situated within the Johanna Falls Scenic Reserve on the Johanna River, the waterfall is composed of 2 drops, each measuring 7.94 metres (26.0 ft) and 20.60 metres (67.6 ft) respectively, with a total height of 28.54 metres (93.6 ft).

== Access ==
The waterfall can be accessed via an unmaintained track that leads off of Blue Johanna Road, leading into the bush.

== See also ==
- Allambee Beek Falls
- Galliebarinda Falls
- Carisbrook Falls
- Swallow Cave Falls
- Erskine Falls
- Sheoak Falls
- Lower Kalimna Falls
