= Amphitheatre Falls (Colac Otway Shire) =

Waterfall in Colac Otway Shire, Victoria, Australia

Amphitheatre Falls Mystery Falls
- Amphitheatre (Mystery) Falls, photographed in 1914

- Location within Victoria
- Location: Separation Creek, Victoria, Australia
- Coordinates: 38°35′08″S 143°50′22″E
- Type: Plunge
- Total height: 15.31 m (50.2 ft)
- Number of drops: 3
- Watercourse: Cumberland River

Amphitheatre Falls (also known as Mystery Falls) is a waterfall on the Cumberland River in the Otway Ranges of Victoria, Australia, within the locality of Separation Creek. The waterfall consists of three drops, each measuring at the heights of 5.21 metres (17.1 ft), 8.08 metres (26.5 ft) and 2.02 metres (6 ft 8 in) respectively, at a total height of 15.31 metres (50.2 ft).

== Description and access ==
The waterfall was named by Hugh Riordan as Mystery Falls, due to the manner in which the water mysteriously disappears at the top when viewed from below. They were later named by bushwalker and waterfall researcher Philip Larkin as "Amphitheatre Falls" due to the amphitheatre-like natural setting of the waterfall.

Downstream of the waterfall is Amphitheatre Cascades, a smaller waterfall consisting of a single drop at a height of 3 metres.

The waterfall can be reached by an unmaintained walking track marked with pink ribbons, that branches off of Curtis Track.

== See also ==
- Allambee Beek Falls
- Galliebarinda Falls
- Carisbrook Falls
- Swallow Cave Falls
- Erskine Falls
- Sheoak Falls
- Lower Kalimna Falls
