= Lower Johanna Falls =

Waterfall in Victoria, Australia

- Location within Victoria
- Location: Johanna, Victoria, Australia
- Coordinates: 38°44′27″S 143°21′52″E
- Type: Plunge
- Total height: 9.59 m (31.5 ft)
- Number of drops: 1
- Watercourse: Johanna River

Lower Johanna Falls is a waterfall located on the Johanna River, in the Otway Ranges of Victoria, Australia. The waterfall, composed of one tier at a height of 9.59 metres (31.5 ft), is situated within the Johanna Falls Scenic Reserve, managed by Parks Victoria.

== Access ==
The waterfall is able to be accessed with an unmaintained track that branches off of Blue Johanna Road, leading into the bush.

== See also ==
- Allambee Beek Falls
- Galliebarinda Falls
- Carisbrook Falls
- Swallow Cave Falls
- Erskine Falls
- Sheoak Falls
- Lower Kalimna Falls
