= Upper Chapple Falls =

Waterfall in Victoria, Australia

Upper Chapple Falls South Chapple Falls
- Location within Victoria
- Location: Lavers Hill, Victoria, Australia
- Coordinates: 38°40′41″S 143°22′53″E
- Type: Plunge
- Total height: 15.72 m (51.6 ft) (Upper Chapple); 7.71 m (25.3 ft) (Middle-Upper); 26.55 m (87.1 ft) (Middle-Lower); 13.06 m (42.8 ft) (Lower)
- Number of drops: 1 (Upper Chapple); 1 (Middle-Upper); 2 (Middle-Lower); 1 (Lower)
- Watercourse: Chapple Creek (Southern Branch)

Upper Chapple Falls (also known as South Chapple Falls) are a series of waterfalls located on the south branch of Chapple Creek in the Otway Ranges, within the locality of Lavers Hill, Victoria, Australia. The complex comprises four waterfalls, with Upper Chapple Falls consisting of one drop at a height of 15.72 metres (51.6 ft), Middle-Upper Chapple Falls, with one drop at 7.71 metres (25.3 ft) in height, Middle-Lower Chapple Falls with two drops each measuring 4.30 metres (14.1 ft) and 22.25 metres (73.0 ft) and a total height of 26.55 metres (87.1 ft), and Lower Chapple Falls, with one drop and a height of 13.06 metres (42.8 ft).

== Description and access ==
The waterfalls are named after the creek, which is likely named after Mr Chapple, an assistant to Charles Smith Wilkinson and Reginald Augustus Frederick Murray on their 1864 surveying expedition for the Victorian Geological Survey, exploring the Aire, Ford and Gellibrand Rivers of the Otway Ranges.

The waterfalls can be reached via an unmarked walking track that branches off of the Lavers Hill — Cobden Road.

== See also ==
- Allambee Beek Falls
- Galliebarinda Falls
- Carisbrook Falls
- Swallow Cave Falls
- Erskine Falls
- Sheoak Falls
- Lower Kalimna Falls
