= Upper Cumberland Falls =

Waterfall in Victoria, Australia

Upper Cumberland Falls Mountjoy Falls
- Location within Victoria
- Location: Separation Creek, Victoria, Australia
- Coordinates: 38°34′21″S 143°50′45″E
- Type: Plunge
- Total height: 17.81 m (58.4 ft)
- Number of drops: 2
- Watercourse: Cumberland River (Northern Branch)

Upper Cumberland Falls (also known as Mountjoy Falls) is a waterfall located on the northern branch of the Cumberland River in the Otway Ranges of Victoria, Australia. The waterfall, located within the locality of Separation Creek, comprises two drops, each with a height of 12.72 metres (41.7 ft) and 5.09 metres (16.7 ft) respectively, with a total height of 17.81 metres (58.4 ft).

== Description and access ==
The waterfall was named "Mountjoy Falls" by William Allin Mountjoy, who, alongside Frederick Martin Straw and Henry Jebb, discovered the waterfall in the 1880s. It has since been known as Upper Cumberland Falls.

The waterfall can be accessed by unmaintained walking tracks, beginning at Curtis Track and T W Spur Track.

== See also ==
- Carisbrook Falls
- Swallow Cave Falls
- Erskine Falls
- Sheoak Falls
- Lower Kalimna Falls
- Yannathan Falls
