= Jack Phillips Cascades =

Waterfall in Victoria, Australia

- Location within Victoria
- Location: Tanybryn, Victoria, Australia
- Coordinates: 38°39′28″S 143°40′55″E
- Type: Plunge
- Total height: 1.80 m (5 ft 11 in)
- Number of drops: 1
- Watercourse: Wild Dog Creek

Jack Phillips Cascades is a small waterfall located on Wild Dog Creek, in the Otway Ranges of Victoria, Australia. Located within the locality of Tanybryn, the waterfall consists of a single drop at a height of 1.80 metres (5 ft 11 in).

== Description and access ==
Located upstream of Wild Dog Falls, the waterfall was named after Jack Phillips, who was once Secretary of the Otway Ranges Walking Track Association. A plaque was dedicated to him in his memory in December 2005 and is situated next to the waterfall.

Access to the waterfall is via an unmaintained walking track that branches off of Wild Dog Track, a track only opened to management vehicles and walkers.

== See also ==
- Allambee Beek Falls
- Galliebarinda Falls
- Carisbrook Falls
- Swallow Cave Falls
- Erskine Falls
- Sheoak Falls
- Lower Kalimna Falls
