= Defiance Falls =

Waterfall in Victoria, Australia

- Defiance Falls

- Location within Victoria
- Location: Separation Creek, Victoria, Australia
- Coordinates: 38°35′09″S 143°56′00″E
- Type: Plunge
- Total height: 17.79 m (58.4 ft)
- Number of drops: 2
- Watercourse: Suicide Gully

Defiance Falls is an intermittent waterfall located in the Otway Ranges, within the locality of Separation Creek, Victoria, Australia. Situated on Suicide Gully, the waterfall is composed of two tiers, with the respective heights of 6.18 metres (20.3 ft) and 11.61 metres (38.1 ft), and a total height of 17.79 metres (58.4 ft).

== Description and access ==
The waterfall requires a significant rain event to flow well, and largely remains dry. They can be viewed from a small adjacent car park reached by travelling towards Lorne on the Great Ocean Road from the west. It is advised not to attempt a u-turn if going in the other direction.

== See also ==
- Allambee Beek Falls
- Galliebarinda Falls
- Carisbrook Falls
- Swallow Cave Falls
- Erskine Falls
- Sheoak Falls
- Lower Kalimna Falls
