= Wangerrip Falls =

Waterfall in Victoria, Australia

- Location within Victoria
- Location: Johanna, Victoria, Australia
- Coordinates: 38°44′18″S 143°21′42″E
- Type: Plunge
- Total height: 18.05 m (59.2 ft)
- Number of drops: 1
- Watercourse: Hider Creek

Wangerrip Falls is a waterfall located in the Otway Ranges, within the locality of Johanna, Victoria, Australia. Situated on Hider Creek, the waterfall consists of a single drop, with a total height of 18.05 metres (59.2 ft). The waterfall is located on private property.

== Description and access ==
The waterfall is named after the name of the old parish that it is situated in. As the waterfall is located on private property, permission must be obtained from the owners.

== See also ==
- Allambee Beek Falls
- Galliebarinda Falls
- Carisbrook Falls
- Swallow Cave Falls
- Erskine Falls
- Sheoak Falls
- Lower Kalimna Falls
