= Brunswick Falls (Victoria) =

Waterfall in Victoria, Australia

- Brunswick Falls

- Location within Victoria
- Location: Separation Creek, Victoria, Australia
- Coordinates: 38°34′45″S 143°51′36″E
- Type: Plunge
- Total height: 15.20 m (49.9 ft)
- Number of drops: 2
- Watercourse: Cumberland River

Brunswick Falls is a waterfall on the Cumberland River, in the Otway Ranges, Victoria, Australia. The waterfall comprises 2 drops, each measuring 13.11 metres (43.0 ft) and 2.09 metres (6 ft 10 in), with a total height of 15.20 metres (49.9 ft).

== Description and access ==
The name is derived from the Melbourne suburb of Brunswick, where Frederick Martin Straw lived at the time of the discovery of the waterfall in the 1880s. He was accompanied with Messrs Mountjoy and Jebb, who went on to discover other waterfalls in the Otways region.

The waterfall is reached by an unmaintained walking track that branches off from Curtis Track.

View from the top of the falls, looking down

== See also ==
- Allambee Beek Falls
- Galliebarinda Falls
- Carisbrook Falls
- Swallow Cave Falls
- Erskine Falls
- Sheoak Falls
- Lower Kalimna Falls
