= Phantom Falls (Surf Coast Shire) =

Waterfall in Lorne, Victoria, Australia

- Phantom Falls, 1907

- Location within Victoria
- Location: Lorne, Victoria, Australia
- Coordinates: 38°32′32″S 143°56′51″E
- Type: Plunge
- Total height: 13.34 m (43.8 ft)
- Number of drops: 1
- Watercourse: St George River

Phantom Falls is a waterfall located on the St George River, outside of Lorne, Victoria, Australia. The waterfall consists of a single drop, at a height of 13.34 metres, and is one of several waterfalls along the Great Ocean Road.

== History ==
The waterfall was named "Phantom Falls" after early settlers who had discovered it initially thought it was located on the St George River, but after the exact location had been lost for some time, the "missing" falls then gave way to its present name.

The waterfall was initially discovered by J. B. Wilsmore (a brickmaker from Brunswick who moved to Lorne) and two others, around 1880. Residents in Lorne were initially skeptical about there being a waterfall being minutes away from the town. Its location was lost for some time, but by 1887, it had started to become a tourist attraction.

== Access ==
From the Allenvale Mill Site Picnic Area, a walking track, which can be steep in some places, reaches the waterfall after 2.5 kilometres. The base of the waterfall is also accessible.

== See also ==
- Carisbrook Falls
- Henderson Falls
- Swallow Cave Falls
- Erskine Falls
- Sheoak Falls
- Lower Kalimna Falls
- Upper Kalimna Falls
- Won Wondah Falls
