= Rainbow Falls (Victoria) =

Waterfall in Victoria, Australia

- Location within Victoria
- Location: Hordern Vale, Victoria, Australia
- Coordinates: 38°50′33″S 143°29′39″E
- Type: Plunge
- Total height: 17.56 m (57.6 ft)
- Number of drops: 1
- Watercourse: (Unnamed spring)

Rainbow Falls is a waterfall located beside Cape Otway, Victoria, Australia. Situated on an unnamed spring, the waterfall, at a height of 17.56 metres (57.6 ft) consisting of one tier, flows into the Southern Ocean.

== Description and access ==
The waterfall gets its name from the way in which a rainbow typically shines on it. The cliff that the waterfall flows over is characterised by limestone, with orange algae and green moss also present.

They can be viewed directly from the base of the waterfall at Station Beach.

== See also ==
- Allambee Beek Falls
- Galliebarinda Falls
- Carisbrook Falls
- Swallow Cave Falls
- Erskine Falls
- Sheoak Falls
- Lower Kalimna Falls
