= Ferny Gully Cascades =

Waterfall in Victoria, Australia

- Location within Victoria
- Location: Aireys Inlet, Victoria, Australia
- Coordinates: 38°25′10″S 144°05′34″E
- Type: Plunge
- Total height: 4.13 m (13.5 ft)
- Number of drops: 1
- Watercourse: Ferny Gully

Ferny Gully Cascades is a small waterfall located within the Otway Ranges, outside of Aireys Inlet, Victoria, Australia. Situated on the intermittent Ferny Gully, the waterfall consists of a single tier, with a total height of 4.13 metres (13.5 ft).

== Description and access ==
As a result of Ferny Gully being intermittent, the waterfall requires a significant rainfall event to flow. The waterfall can be viewed via a 12-kilometre loop walk which also passes by Currawong Falls.

== See also ==
- Allambee Beek Falls
- Galliebarinda Falls
- Carisbrook Falls
- Swallow Cave Falls
- Erskine Falls
- Sheoak Falls
- Lower Kalimna Falls
