= Wanliss Falls =

Waterfall in Victoria, Australia

- Wanliss Falls

- Location within Victoria
- Location: Lorne, Victoria, Australia
- Coordinates: 38°30′23″S 143°54′26″E
- Type: Plunge
- Total height: 18.42 m (60.4 ft) (Lower); 14.91 m (48.9 ft) (Upper)
- Number of drops: 2 (Lower); 1 (Upper)
- Watercourse: Erskine River

Wanliss Falls is a waterfall located within the Otway Ranges outisde of Lorne, Victoria, Australia. Situated upstream of Erskine Falls on the Erskine River, the waterfall (or waterfalls, given the distance between sections of the tiers), can be considered to be split into a lower and upper section, with the lower section comprising 2 drops each at a respective height of 14.15 metres (46.4 ft) and 4.27 metres (14.0 ft) and a total height of 18.42 metres (60.4 ft), and the upper section comprising a single drop with a total height of 14.91 metres (48.9 ft).

== Description and access ==
The waterfall were discovered and named after Lieutenant Harold Boyd Wanliss (1891–1917), who owned nearby land. Harold Boyd Wanliss was killed in action at the Battle of Polygon Wood in Belgium during World War I.

Harold Boyd Wanliss (1891–1917), the waterfall's discoverer and namesake

Despite their close proximity to Erskine Falls and its car park, there is no formal walking track from these locations to the waterfalls, so traversing the thick bush is required.

== See also ==
- Allambee Beek Falls
- Galliebarinda Falls
- Carisbrook Falls
- Swallow Cave Falls
- Erskine Falls
- Sheoak Falls
- Lower Kalimna Falls
