= Won Wondah Falls =

Waterfall in Victoria, Australia

- Won Wondah Falls

- Location within Victoria
- Location: Lorne, Victoria, Australia
- Coordinates: 38°33′00″S 143°56′17″E
- Type: Plunge
- Total height: 7.46 m (24.5 ft)
- Number of drops: 1
- Watercourse: Henderson Creek

Won Wondah Falls is a waterfall located on Henderson Creek, immediately outside of Lorne, Victoria, Australia. The waterfall, containing a single tier with a total height of 7.46 metres, is one of several waterfalls along the Great Ocean Road.

== Description and access ==
The name of the waterfall likely derives from a western Victorian Aboriginal term, "wonwondah witchoop" (meaning "another swamp adjoining the last"), or "wawunna" or "wonwonda" (meaning "small shrub"), which in turn became the name of a pastoral run near Horsham, also known as Won Wondah, though it is unclear how the waterfall and pastoral run became connected.

The waterfall can be reached by a walking track from Sheoak Picnic Ground, with the track being 1.8 kilometres in one direction and back, finishing at Henderson Falls and passing Won Wondah Falls along the way, as well as several other tracks. No direct access to the base of the falls is possible.

== See also ==
- Carisbrook Falls
- Swallow Cave Falls
- Erskine Falls
- Phantom Falls
- Sheoak Falls
- Lower Kalimna Falls
- Upper Kalimna Falls
