= Yannathan Falls =

Waterfall in Victoria, Australia

- Location within Victoria
- Location: Separation Creek, Victoria, Australia
- Coordinates: 38°34′09″S 143°50′34″E
- Type: Plunge
- Total height: 10.26 m (33.7 ft)
- Number of drops: 2
- Watercourse: Cumberland River (Northern Branch)

Yannathan Falls is a waterfall located in the Otway Ranges of Victoria, Australia. The waterfall, situated on the Cumberland River (Northern Branch), consists of 2 drops, each measuring 6.42 metres (21.1 ft) and 3.84 metres (12.6 ft), with a total height of 10.26 metres (33.7 ft).

== Description and access ==
The waterfall was named by waterfall researcher Philip Larkin, with "Yannathan" being an Aboriginal word reputedly meaning "to walkabout, ramble or roam".

The waterfall can be reached via unmaintained walking tracks starting at T W Spur Track or Curtis Track, passing several other waterfalls in the area.

=== Yannathan Cascades ===
Yannathan Cascades is a smaller waterfall located downstream of Yannathan Falls and consists of a single tier with a height of 2.18 metres (7 ft 2 in). The base of the cascades has a natural pool.

== See also ==
- Carisbrook Falls
- Swallow Cave Falls
- Erskine Falls
- Sheoak Falls
- Lower Kalimna Falls
- Upper Cumberland Falls
