= Skinner Creek Falls =

Waterfall in Victoria, Australia

- Location within Victoria
- Location: Chapple Vale, Victoria, Australia
- Coordinates: 38°40′37″S 143°19′48″E
- Type: Plunge
- Total height: 3.80 m (12.5 ft)
- Number of drops: 1
- Watercourse: Skinner Creek

Skinner Creek Falls is a waterfall located in the Otway Ranges, within the locality of Chapple Vale, Victoria, Australia. Situated on Skinner Creek, the waterfall is composed of one drop with a height of 3.80 metres (12.5 ft).

== Description and access ==
The waterfall is named after the creek, which in turn is named after John Skinner (1831–1907). Born in Comberton, England, he was an early landowner in the area, moving to nearby Wangerrip in his later years.

The waterfall can be accessed by an unmaintained track through the bush beside the Skinner Creek Track Bridge.

== See also ==
- Allambee Beek Falls
- Galliebarinda Falls
- Carisbrook Falls
- Swallow Cave Falls
- Erskine Falls
- Sheoak Falls
- Lower Kalimna Falls
