= Currawong Falls =

Waterfall in Victoria, Australia

- Location within Victoria
- Location: Aireys Inlet, Victoria, Australia
- Coordinates: 38°25′22″S 144°05′21″E
- Type: Plunge
- Total height: 9.48 m (31.1 ft)
- Number of drops: 1
- Watercourse: Distillery Creek

Currawong Falls is a waterfall located in the Otway Ranges, within the locality of Aireys Inlet, Victoria, Australia. Situated on Distillery Creek, the waterfall consists of a single drop at a height of 9.48 metres (31.1 ft).

== Description and access ==
The waterfall is named after the currawong bird. The waterfall requires decent rainfall to flow, as Distillery Creek's catchment is small and often remains dry.

The waterfall can be accessed via a 12 kilometre loop walk that also passes the nearby Ferny Gully Cascades.

== See also ==
- Allambee Beek Falls
- Galliebarinda Falls
- Carisbrook Falls
- Swallow Cave Falls
- Erskine Falls
- Sheoak Falls
- Lower Kalimna Falls
