= Cora Lynn Falls (Surf Coast Shire) =

Waterfall in Surf Coast Shire, Victoria, Australia

- Cora Lynn Falls

- Location within Victoria
- Location: Lorne, Victoria, Australia
- Coordinates: 38°31′15″S 143°55′30″E
- Type: Plunge
- Total height: 26.69 m (87.6 ft)
- Number of drops: 6
- Watercourse: Cora Lynn Creek

Cora Lynn Falls is a waterfall located in the Otway Ranges, outside of Lorne, Victoria, Australia. Situated on Cora Lynn Creek, the waterfall consists of six tiers, each measuring 4.35 metres (14.3 ft), 4.70 metres (15.4 ft), 2.99 metres (9 ft 10 in), 3.93 metres (12.9 ft), 5.33 metres (17.5 ft) and 5.39 metres (17.7 ft) respectively, with a total height of 26.29 metres (86.3 ft).

== Access ==
The waterfall can be reached from Erskine Falls via the Lemonade Creek Walking Track, or from a walking track starting at the Blanket Leaf Picnic Ground, located on Erskine Falls Road.

== See also ==
- Allambee Beek Falls
- Galliebarinda Falls
- Carisbrook Falls
- Swallow Cave Falls
- Erskine Falls
- Sheoak Falls
- Lower Kalimna Falls
