= Upper Parker River Falls =

Waterfall in Victoria, Australia

- Location within Victoria
- Location: Cape Otway, Victoria, Australia
- Coordinates: 38°50′33″S 143°33′16″E
- Type: Plunge
- Total height: 10.79 m (35.4 ft)
- Number of drops: 2
- Watercourse: Parker River

Upper Parker River Falls is a waterfall located in the Otway Ranges, within the locality of Cape Otway, Victoria, Australia. Situated on the Parker River, the waterfall consists of two drops, each at the heights of 3.43 metres (11.3 ft) and 7.36 metres (24.1 ft) respectively, with a total height of 10.79 metres (35.4 ft).

== Description and access ==
The waterfall is named after the river, which in turn is named after Amelia Parker, the then-fiancée of surveyor George Douglas Smythe. There is no walking track to the waterfall, and access is only via traversing the bush or following the river upstream.

== See also ==
- Allambee Beek Falls
- Galliebarinda Falls
- Carisbrook Falls
- Swallow Cave Falls
- Erskine Falls
- Sheoak Falls
- Lower Kalimna Falls
