= Wild Dog Falls =

Waterfall in Victoria, Australia

- Wild Dog Falls, photographed around 1925

- Location within Victoria
- Location: Tanybryn, Victoria, Australia
- Coordinates: 38°39′30″S 143°40′48″E
- Type: Plunge
- Total height: 14.15 m (46.4 ft)
- Number of drops: 1
- Watercourse: Wild Dog Creek

Wild Dog Falls is a waterfall located on Wild Dog Creek, within the Otway Ranges, Victoria, Australia. Situated in the locality of Tanybryn, the waterfall comprises one tier at a height of 14.15 metres (46.4 ft).

== Description and access ==
The waterfall is characterised by cliffs on either side, complete with multi-coloured vegetation. Access to the waterfall is by walking along the Wild Dog Track (which is only open for management vehicles and walkers), followed by an unmaintained track down to the waterfall.

== See also ==
- Allambee Beek Falls
- Galliebarinda Falls
- Carisbrook Falls
- Swallow Cave Falls
- Jack Phillips Cascades
- Erskine Falls
- Sheoak Falls
- Lower Kalimna Falls
