= Upper Blanket Bay Falls =

Waterfall in Victoria, Australia

- Location within Victoria
- Location: Cape Otway, Victoria, Australia
- Coordinates: 38°49′34″S 143°34′52″E
- Type: Plunge
- Total height: 7.96 m (26.1 ft)
- Number of drops: 1
- Watercourse: Blanket Bay Creek

Upper Blanket Bay Falls is a waterfall located in the Otway Ranges, within the locality of Cape Otway, Victoria, Australia. Situated on Blanket Bay Creek, the waterfall consists of a single tier with a height of 7.96 metres (26.1 ft). The waterfall can be viewed from the Katabanut walking track, which begins near the Blanket Bay Campground.

== See also ==
- Allambee Beek Falls
- Galliebarinda Falls
- Carisbrook Falls
- Swallow Cave Falls
- Erskine Falls
- Sheoak Falls
- Lower Kalimna Falls
