= Urquharts Falls =

Waterfall in Victoria, Australia

- Urquharts Falls, between 1920–1950s

- Location within Victoria
- Location: Apollo Bay, Victoria, Australia
- Coordinates: 38°43′35″S 143°41′28″E
- Type: Plunge
- Total height: 40.31 m (132.3 ft)
- Number of drops: 1
- Watercourse: Stony Creek

Urquharts Falls is a waterfall located on Stony Creek, adjacent to the Great Ocean Road, outside of the town of Apollo Bay, Victoria, Australia. The waterfall, consisting of a single tier at a height of 40.31 metres (132.3 ft), is situated on private property.

== History and access ==
The name of the waterfall originates from Thomas 'Ted' Alexander Urquhart (1903–1984), born in Evanton, Scotland. Him and his Geelong-born wife Mary Beatrice Urquhart (née Evans) (1902–1992) lived in Apollo Bay from at least the 1940s and operated The Falls Guest House, adjacent to the waterfall, until it burnt down in 1958.

The Falls Guest House (~1950)

Whilst the waterfall is situated on private property, it can easily be seen from the Great Ocean Road.

== See also ==
- Allambee Beek Falls
- Galliebarinda Falls
- Carisbrook Falls
- Swallow Cave Falls
- Erskine Falls
- Sheoak Falls
- Lower Kalimna Falls
