= Winterbrook Falls =

Waterfall in Victoria, Australia

- Location within Victoria
- Location: Lorne, Victoria, Australia
- Coordinates: 38°34′20″S 143°56′26″E
- Type: Plunge
- Total height: 16.19 m (53.1 ft)
- Number of drops: 1
- Watercourse: (Tributary of Cumberland River)

Winterbrook Falls is a waterfall located within the Otway Ranges, near Lorne, Victoria, Australia. The waterfall comprises a single tier at a height of 16.19 metres (53.1 ft). The waterfall is located on a tributary of the Cumberland River.

== Description and access ==
The waterfall does not flow regularly, and requires significant rainfall to fall substantially. The waterfall was named "Winterbrook Falls" by waterfall researcher Philip Larkin due to winter having the highest likelihood for rainfall.

The waterfall can be accessed by walking up the gully from where it reaches the Cumberland River and the walking track that skirts it. Avalanche Falls is located downstream from the waterfall.

== See also ==
- Carisbrook Falls
- Swallow Cave Falls
- Erskine Falls
- Sheoak Falls
- Lower Kalimna Falls
