= Lower Blanket Bay Falls =

Waterfall in Victoria, Australia

- Location within Victoria
- Location: Cape Otway, Victoria, Australia
- Coordinates: 38°49′34″S 143°34′55″E
- Type: Plunge
- Total height: 4.32 m (14.2 ft)
- Number of drops: 1
- Watercourse: Blanket Bay Creek

Lower Blanket Bay Falls is a waterfall located in the Otway Ranges, within the locality of Cape Otway, Victoria, Australia. The waterfall, situated on Blanket Bay Creek, comprises a single drop with a height of 4.32 metres (14.2 ft). The waterfall can be viewed from the nearby Blanket Bay Campgrounds, or from walking upstream from Blanket Bay.

== See also ==
- Allambee Beek Falls
- Galliebarinda Falls
- Carisbrook Falls
- Swallow Cave Falls
- Erskine Falls
- Sheoak Falls
- Lower Kalimna Falls
