= Cumberland Falls (Surf Coast Shire) =

Waterfall in Surf Coast Shire, Victoria, Australia

- Location within Victoria
- Location: Lorne, Victoria, Australia
- Coordinates: 38°33′53″S 143°55′52″E
- Type: Plunge
- Total height: 4.75 m (15.6 ft)
- Number of drops: 1
- Watercourse: Cumberland River

Cumberland Falls is a waterfall located on the Cumberland River in the Otway Ranges, near Lorne, Victoria, Australia. The waterfall comprises one tier, with a height of 4.75 metres (15.6 ft).

== Description and access ==
The waterfall was originally known as Gages Falls. It can be reached via a walking track from the Cumberland River Holiday Park, passing Jebbs Pool. It can also be reached via a walking track beginning at the Sheoak Picnic Area.

== See also ==
- Carisbrook Falls
- Swallow Cave Falls
- Erskine Falls
- Sheoak Falls
- Lower Kalimna Falls
