= Avalanche Falls =

Waterfall in Victoria, Australia

- Location within Victoria
- Location: Lorne, Victoria, Australia
- Coordinates: 38°34′22″S 143°56′33″E
- Type: Plunge
- Total height: 5.45 m (17.9 ft)
- Number of drops: 1
- Watercourse: (Tributary of Cumberland River)

Avalanche Falls is a waterfall located in the Otway Ranges, in the vicinity of Lorne, Victoria, Australia. The waterfall, located on a tributary of the Cumberland River, consists of a single drop, at a height of 5.45 metres (17.9 ft).

== Description and access ==
The previously unnamed waterfall was named by Ray Barber and Ian Wacey, the co-authors of the book 250 Victorian Waterfalls, after one of the co-authors dislodged a rock whilst climbing up towards the waterfall, endangering the other co-author. The name "Avalanche" was chosen as a reminder of the danger of rockfalls when exploring waterfalls.

The waterfall can be reached by the walking track beginning at the Cumberland River Holiday Park. From reaching the gully, after following it upstream, the waterfall is reached. Continuing further upstream is Winterbrook Falls.

== See also ==
- Carisbrook Falls
- Swallow Cave Falls
- Erskine Falls
- Sheoak Falls
- Lower Kalimna Falls
