= Straw Falls =

Waterfall in Victoria, Australia

- Straw Falls

- Location within Victoria
- Location: Lorne, Victoria, Australia
- Coordinates: 38°30′25″S 143°55′01″E
- Type: Plunge
- Total height: 31.51 m (103.4 ft)
- Number of drops: 1
- Watercourse: Tributary of Erskine River

Straw Falls is a waterfall on a tributary of the Erskine River in the Otway Ranges near Lorne, Victoria, Australia. The waterfall consists of a single drop with a height of approximately 31.51 metres.

== History ==
Straw Falls was discovered around 1874 by a party of three explorers, including Frederick Martin Straw, after whom the waterfall is named. Straw was one of the early explorers of the Lorne area and played a significant role in identifying several waterfalls throughout the Otway Ranges during the late nineteenth century. The discovery of Straw Falls formed part of a wider period of exploration around the Erskine River and its tributaries, which led to the recognition of numerous waterfalls, including Erskine Falls nearby.

== Description and access ==
Straw Falls is located a short distance downstream from Erskine Falls and is accessed via a bush track requiring a crossing of the Erskine River. The route can become muddy and slippery, particularly after rainfall, and requires appropriate preparation and care.

The waterfall descends over a series of rock ledges, with the flow moving from left to right when viewed from the front of the falls.

== See also ==
- Erskine Falls
- Splitters Falls
- Stevensons Falls
