= Henderson Falls =

Waterfall in Victoria, Australia

- Henderson Falls

- Location within Victoria
- Location: Lorne, Victoria, Australia
- Coordinates: 38°32′58″S 143°56′04″E
- Type: Plunge
- Total height: 10.09 m (33.1 ft)
- Number of drops: 1
- Watercourse: Henderson Creek

Henderson Falls is a waterfall located on Henderson Creek, immediately outside of Lorne, Victoria, Australia. The waterfall consists of a single drop, at a height of 10.09 metres, and is one of several waterfalls along the Great Ocean Road.

== Description and access ==
The waterfall is likely named after Scottish-born James Grainger Henderson and his Keilor-born wife Mary Ann Henderson (nee Curtis), who were early settlers in the Benwerrin area.

The waterfall can be reached by a walking track from Sheoak Picnic Ground, with the track being 1.8 kilometres in one direction and back, passing Won Wondah Falls along the way, as well as several other tracks. They are best viewed after substantial rain, when flows cover the rockface.

== See also ==
- Carisbrook Falls
- Swallow Cave Falls
- Erskine Falls
- Sheoak Falls
- Lower Kalimna Falls
