= Upper Kalimna Falls =

Waterfall in Victoria, Australia

- Upper Kalimna Falls (photographed in 1935)

- Location within Victoria
- Location: Lorne, Victoria, Australia
- Coordinates: 38°33′43″S 143°54′32″E
- Type: Plunge
- Total height: 19.62 m (64.4 ft)
- Number of drops: 1
- Watercourse: Kalimna Creek

Upper Kalimna Falls is a waterfall located in the Otway Ranges, outside of Lorne, Victoria, Australia. The waterfall, comprising a single tier with a total height of 19.62 metres, is one of numerous waterfalls along the Great Ocean Road.

== Description, history and access ==
Both Lower and Upper Kalimna Falls have been tourist destinations since at least the early 1900s and "Kalimna", an Aboriginal word, likely means "beautiful". The waterfall is much higher compared to its lower counterpart, and comprises a block-like structure at its top, with the water flowing down a rock wall covered in moss.

From the Sheoak Picnic Ground, a 2.9-kilometre track leads to Lower Kalimna Falls, with a further 1.2-kilometre track to the waterfall.

== See also ==
- Carisbrook Falls
- Swallow Cave Falls
- Erskine Falls
- Sheoak Falls
