= Splitters Falls =

Waterfall in Victoria, Australia

- Splitters Falls, photographed around 1880

- Location within Victoria
- Location: Lorne, Victoria, Australia
- Coordinates: 38°30′28″S 143°55′49″E
- Type: Plunge
- Total height: 40.71 m (133.6 ft)
- Number of drops: 2
- Watercourse: Splitters Creek

Splitters Falls is a waterfall in the Otway Ranges near Lorne, Victoria, Australia. The waterfall consists of two principal drops measuring approximately 21.60 metres and 19.11 metres, giving it a total height of around 40.71 metres.

== History ==
Splitters Falls, and Splitters Creek were named in the early 1870s after two timber splitters who are credited with discovering the waterfall while attempting to find a route from the inland Otway forests to the coast.

The story of the waterfall's discovery was later recounted by F. M. Straw in The Herald in August 1922. According to Straw's account, the two splitters had intended to cross the Otway Ranges to reach the coast for a fishing trip but became lost in dense bushland. Following a spur into a steep gully, they decided to trace a small creek downstream, reasoning that it would eventually lead them to sea. After forcing their way through thick scrub, they emerged at the brink of a large waterfall. Mistaking the cleared area around the falls for a possible settlement, they instead found themselves overlooking the cascade.

The pair made a difficult descent to the base of the falls, where they observed that the creek had become a much larger stream, swollen by winter rains. Concluding that they had reached the Erskine River, they followed it downstream until they reached the coast at Lorne.

The waterfall became known as Splitters Falls in recognition of its discoverers. Its discovery prompted further exploration of the surrounding river systems, leading to the identification of several other waterfalls in the Lorne area, including Erskine Falls on the Erskine River, waterfalls on the St George River such as Phantom Falls, and additional waterfalls along the Cumberland River.

By the 1880s, Splitters Falls had become a destination for visitors to Lorne. In January 1885, the Ballarat Star reported that a party comprising Miss Coghill, F. Wheen of the Wesleyan Ladies' College, J. Wheen, and Mr. Hawkins, a student from Wesley College, attempted to visit the falls via one of the steep bush tracks. The difficult terrain delayed their return journey, and nightfall forced the group to camp in the bush. Heavy rain during the night left them thoroughly soaked before they resumed their journey at first light, eventually returning to Erskine House shortly before noon after an absence of approximately 26 hours.

== Access ==
Car parking is available at the nearby Erskine Falls. A walking track that leads downstream from the base of Erskine Falls towards Lorne passes by Splitters Falls. Closer access can be gained by walking through the scrub, though the undergrowth is thick and parts of the journey contain blackberry bushes.

== See also ==
- Erskine Falls
- Straw Falls
