= Melba Gully State Park =

- IUCN category II (national park)
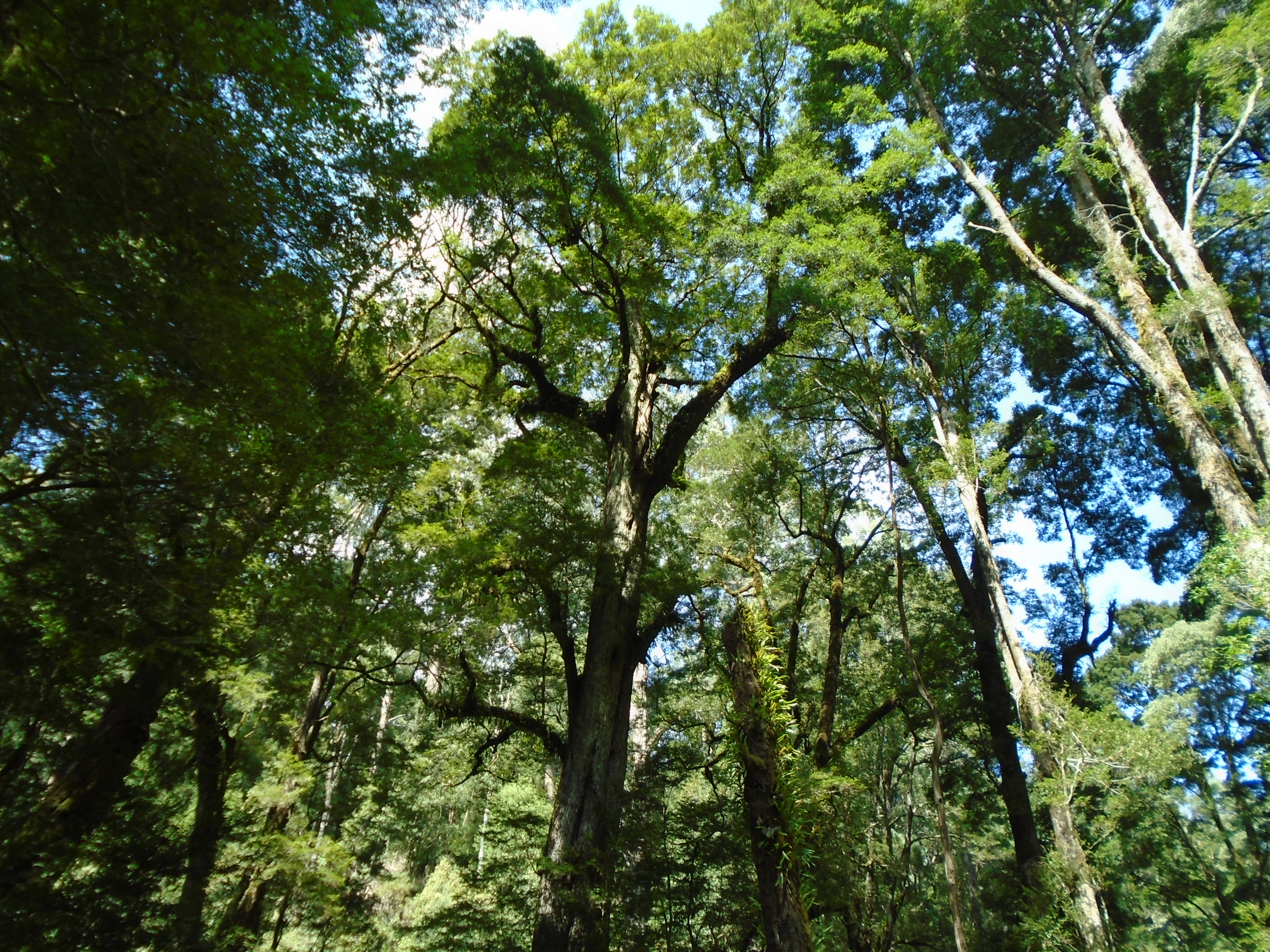

- Location within Victoria
- Location: Victoria
- Nearest city: Lavers Hill
- Coordinates: 38°41′50″S 143°22′10″E
- Area: 0.65 km^{2} (0.25 sq mi)
- Established: 1978
- Governing body: Parks Victoria
- Website: Official website

The Melba Gully State Park was formed to protect a small pocket of temperate rainforest in the Otway Ranges near Apollo Bay, Victoria, Australia. The 48-hectare (120-acre) park is extremely valuable as one of the few pockets of natural old-growth Otway Ranges rainforests to survive the logging and subsequent fires, making it a crucial resource for the efforts to regenerate the original Otway Ranges rainforests. The park now forms part of the Great Otway National Park.

The gully has a dense cover of myrtle beech (Nothofagus cunninghamii), blackwood (Acacia melanoxylon) and tree-ferns, with an understorey of low ferns and mosses. Glow worms (Arachnocampa otwayensis), which are the bioluminescent larvae of small flies known as fungus gnats, can be seen at night along the stream banks and walking tracks.

The park has few facilities due to its small size, but it has a picnic ground and basic picnic facilities, with the main attraction being the 35 minute Madsens Track Nature Walk.

== See also ==
- Annes Cascade
- Tarra-Bulga National Park
- Errinundra National Park
