= Johanna River =

Perennial river in Victoria, Australia

Johanna
- Location of the Johanna River mouth in Victoria
- Etymology: After the wreaked schooner Joanna

Location
- Country: Australia
- State: Victoria
- Region: South East Coastal Plain (IBRA), The Otways
- Local government area: Colac Otway Shire

Physical characteristics
- Source: Otway Ranges
  - location: below Lavers Hill
  - coordinates: 38°40′59″S 143°23′01″E
  - elevation: 429 m (1,407 ft)
- Mouth: Great Australian Bight
  - location: Johanna Beach
  - coordinates: 38°46′14″S 143°23′43″E
  - elevation: 0 m (0 ft)
- Length: 14 km (8.7 mi)

Basin features
- River system: Corangamite catchment
- National park: Great Otway National Park

The Johanna River is a perennial river of the Corangamite catchment, in the Otways region of the Australian state of Victoria.

== Location and features ==
The Johanna River rises in the Otway Ranges in southwest Victoria, below Lavers Hill, and flows generally south through the Great Otway National Park before reaching its river mouth and emptying into the Great Australian Bight, west of Cape Otway at Johanna Beach, near Johanna. From its highest point, the river descends 429 metres (1,407 ft) over its 14-kilometre (8.7 mi) course.

== Etymology ==
The river, Johanna Beach and the surrounding locality of Johanna are named after the schooner Joanna, wrecked nearby on 22 September 1843.

== See also ==
- List of rivers of Australia § Victoria
