= Johanna, Victoria =

Town in Victoria, Australia

Johanna
- Town
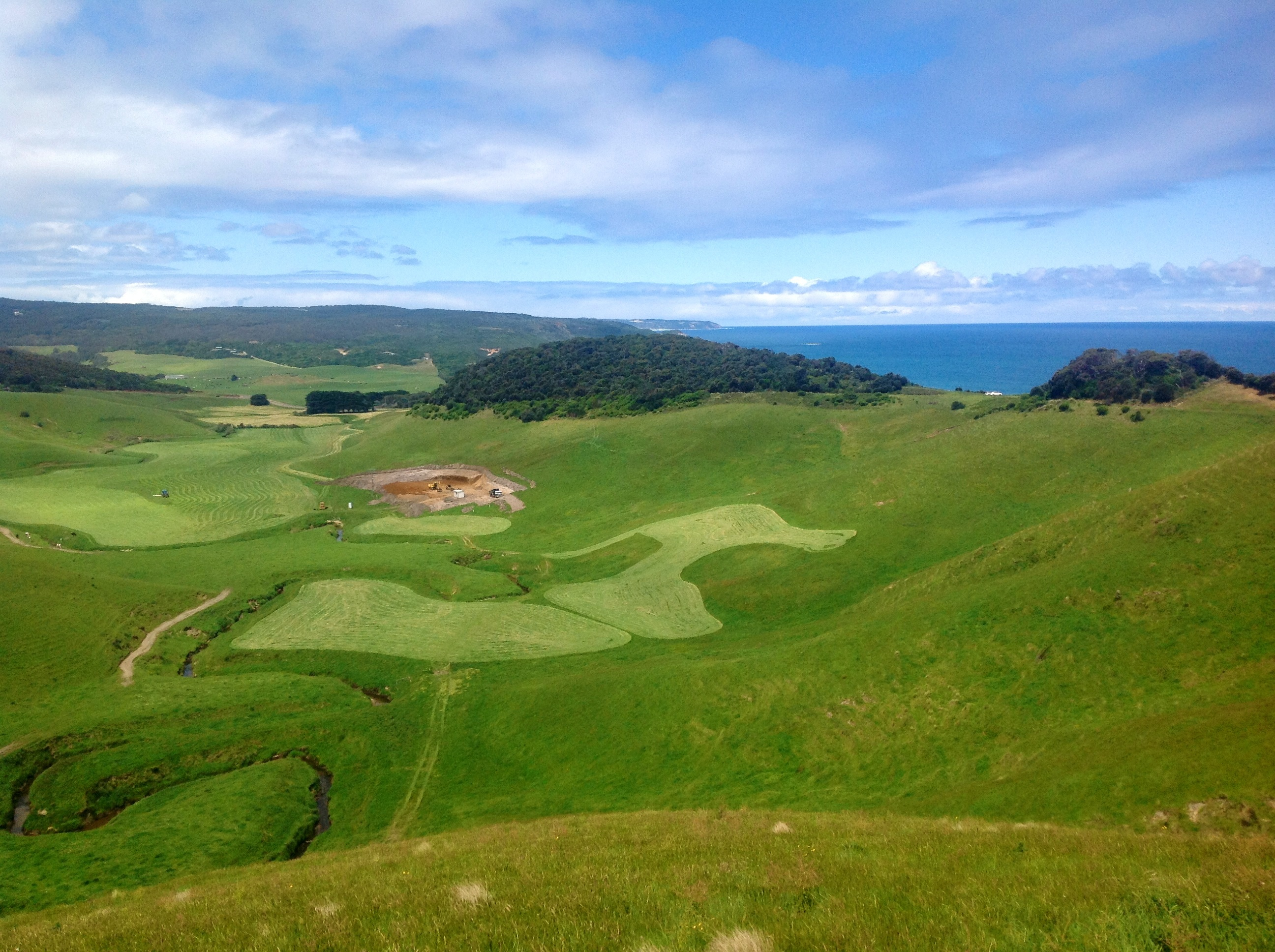
- Inland view of Johanna Beach from the Great Ocean Walk, 2012

- Interactive map of Johanna
- Coordinates: 38°45′0″S 143°23′0″E
- Country: Australia
- State: Victoria
- LGA: Colac Otway Shire
- Location: 213 km (132 mi) SW of Melbourne; 140 km (87 mi) SW of Geelong; 115 km (71 mi) NE of Warrnambool; 41 km (25 mi) W of Apollo Bay

Government
  - State electorate: Polwarth
  - Federal division: Wannon

Population
  - Total: 85 (SAL 2021)
- Postcode: 3238
Localities around Johanna
Lavers Hill	Lavers Hill	Wyelangta
Yuulong	Johanna	Glenaire
Southern Ocean	Southern Ocean	Glenaire

Johanna is a locality on the coast of Victoria, Australia located west of Cape Otway in the Colac Otway Shire. It is named after the schooner Joanna, which was wrecked at the mouth of what is now the Johanna River on 22 September 1843.

== History ==
Johanna Post Office opened on 1 November 1913 and closed in 1967. Johanna State School opened in 1911 and closed in 1916. It operated half-time with the Cape Otway (1911-14) and Johanna River (1914-16) schools.

The surfing beach at Johanna is a long stretch of beach breaks, or beach and reef, noted for its power, and its reputation for rapid jumps in size, doubling over the space of just a few hours.

In 1970, the final of the World Surfboard Riding Championships was held at Johanna Beach because of persistently poor surfing conditions at the Bells Beach venue. Since then, the Bells Beach Surf Classic competition has been moved from Bells Beach to Johanna when the surf at Bells has been flat, such as in 2003 and 2010. The westerly-facing beach at Johanna picks up swells that miss Bells and the Surf Coast.
