= Erskine River =

River in Victoria, Australia

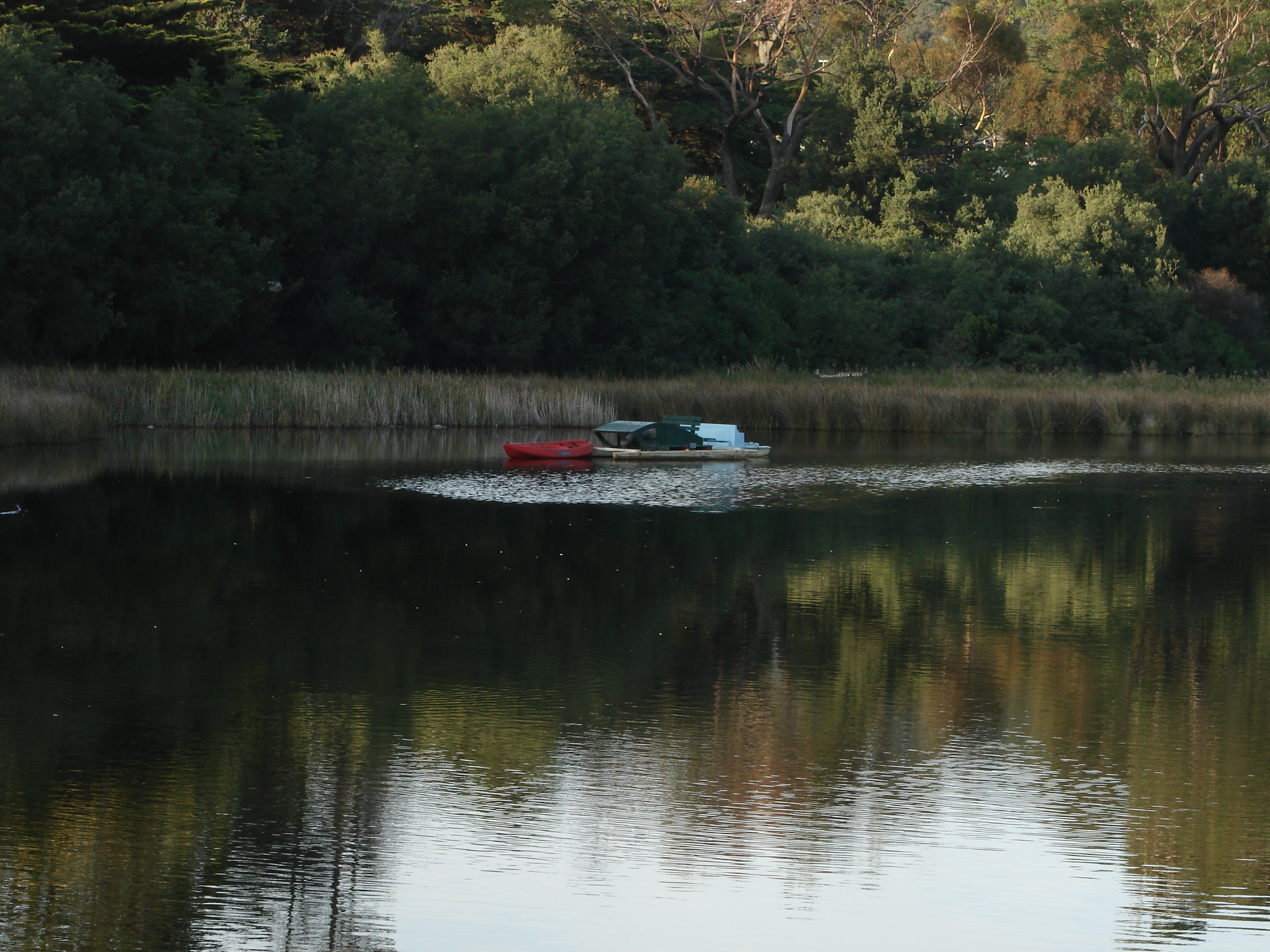
- Erskine River at Lorne

Location
- Country: Australia
- State: Victoria

Physical characteristics
- Mouth: Bass Strait
  - location: Lorne
  - coordinates: 38.535°S 143.976°E
- Basin size: 32.9 km^{2} (12.7 sq mi)

Basin features
- Tributaries
  - left: Little Erskine River
- Waterfalls: Erskine Falls

The Erskine River is a river in southwestern Victoria, Australia. It arises in the Otway Ranges and enters Bass Strait to the east of Cape Otway through the town of Lorne. The Erskine River above the falls is known for its high diversity of native fish species and low occurrence of introduced species.

== See also ==
- Great Ocean Road
