= Lavers Hill =

- Town
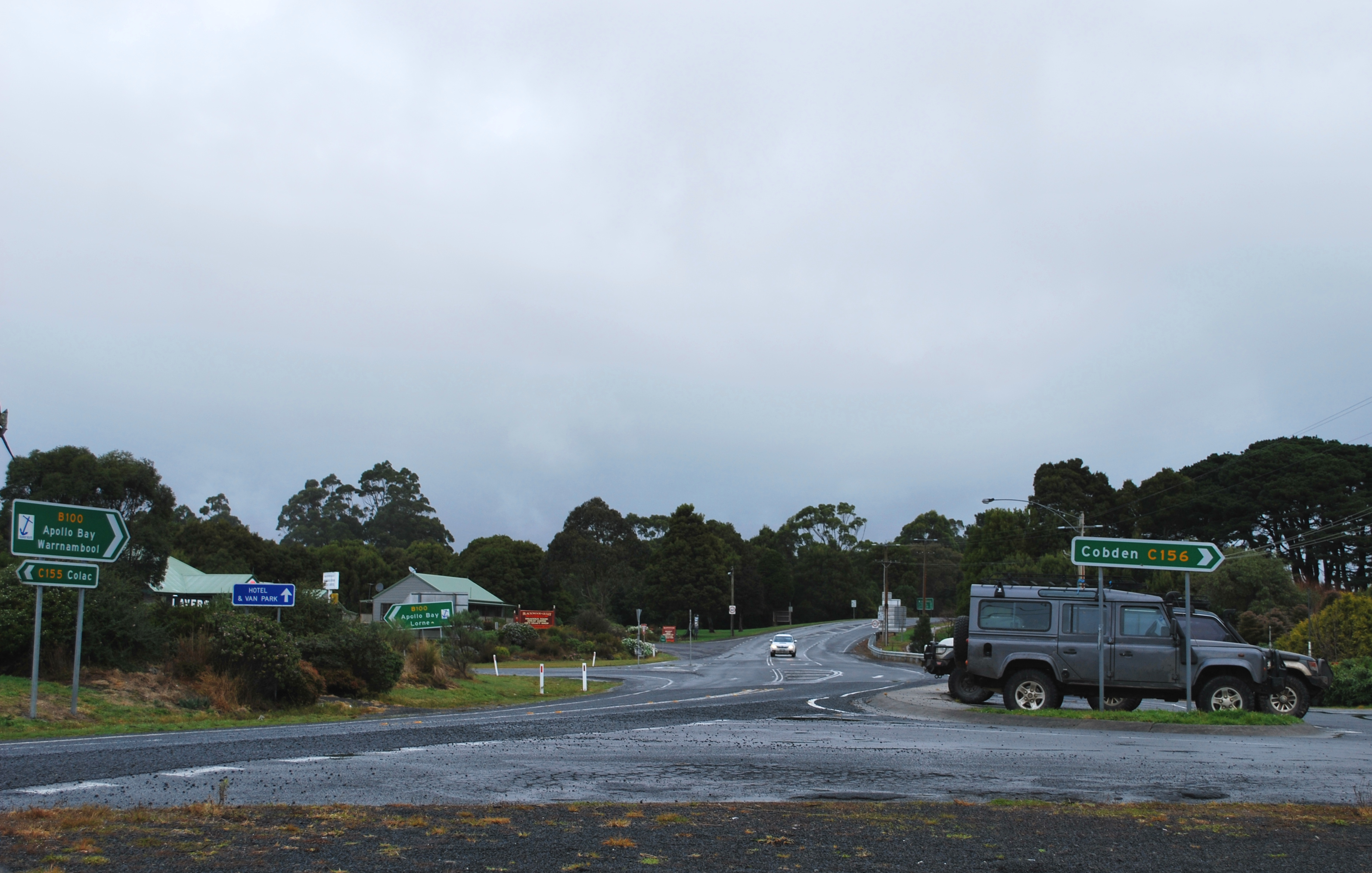
- Great Ocean Road at Lavers Hill

- Coordinates: 38°40′0″S 143°24′0″E
- Country: Australia
- State: Victoria
- LGA: Colac Otway Shire
- Location: 205 km (127 mi) SW of Melbourne; 134 km (83 mi) SW of Geelong; 56 km (35 mi) S of Colac; 48 km (30 mi) W of Apollo Bay; 48 km (30 mi) E of Port Campbell
- Established: 1891

Government
  - State electorate: Polwarth
  - Federal division: Wannon
- Elevation: 450 m (1,480 ft)

Population
  - Total: 78 (2016 census)
- Postcode: 3238
Localities around Lavers Hill
Carlisle River; Chapple Vale	Carlisle River	Carlisle River; Wyelangta
Chapple Vale	Lavers Hill	Wyelangta
Yuulong	Johanna	Johanna

Lavers Hill is a town in Victoria, Australia, located 48 kilometres (30 mi) inland from Port Campbell and 48 kilometres (30 mi) from Apollo Bay. The township is located approximately 205 kilometres (127 mi) south-west of the state capital, Melbourne. At the 2016 census, Lavers Hill had a population of 78.

== History ==
Lavers Hill was named after two settlers from Gippsland called Stephen and Frank Laver. The first saw mill was opened in 1900 and so was the church next to the College. Old families from as far back as the 1880s still reside near Lavers Hill, e.g. Speight, Hampshire and Farrell. Development of Lavers Hill happened quickly. Lavers Hill depended on logging and agriculture for its income. It also is dependent on tourism. A bank was opened in 1906, the community hall was opened, a cheese factory and butcher shop were built and also a hotel. A lot of these businesses have closed down. The Community hall was literally blown over in 1930 and rebuilt in 1933. The hotel was burnt down in 1919 and again in 1930. The cheese factory closed and so did the butcher.

=== Lavers Hill School ===
The Lavers Hill school was opened in 1910 as a rented room in the cheese factory. Another school was built near the church in 1911. In 1953, Johanna school and this were consolidated. At one point, Lavers Hill school had 500 kids. Today it has around 100 students from Beech Forest, Ferguson, Gellibrand, Colac, Lower Gellibrand, Johanna and Hordernvale and was opened in 1911. This school has recently celebrated its centenary on 2/3 April 2011.It caters for students ranging from kindergarten to Year 12.

== Town features ==
Lavers Hill Post Office opened around 1902. There is a town hall, opened in 1933. Locals use it for CERT meetings, badminton matches, progress meetings and other uses like that. On the way to Port Campbell, along the right of the road, there is a police station. Opposite to the Police Station there is the roadhouse and a tavern.

Lavers Hill is a favourite among tourist hotspots as it is only half an hour to the Twelve Apostles, an hour to Colac, is on the Great Ocean Road, is half an hour to the Otway Fly, and is less than an hour to Apollo Bay. It is the meeting point of the roads to Colac, Cobden, Apollo Bay and Port Campbell.
