= Separation Creek =

- Town
- Coordinates: 38°35′27″S 143°52′20″E
- Country: Australia
- State: Victoria
- LGA: Colac Otway Shire
- Location: 42 km (26 mi) SE of Colac; 66 km (41 mi) SW of Geelong; 130 km (81 mi) SW of Melbourne

Government
  - State electorate: Polwarth
  - Federal division: Wannon

Population
  - Total: 28 (2021 census)
- Postcode: 3234
Localities around Separation Creek
| Barwon Downs | Lorne | Lorne |
| Barramunga | Separation Creek | Bass Strait |
| Wye River | Wye River | Bass Strait |

Separation Creek is a locality in the Shire of Colac Otway, Victoria, Australia. In the 2016 census, Separation Creek had a population of 19.

== History ==
The Bluegum Timber and Transport Company was established in 1912 at the township, and built a jetty where timber transported via a tramway could be offloaded. This original jetty was deemed too dangerous and another one was built closer to the mill.

On Christmas Day 2015 a bushfire destroyed at least 18 homes in Separation Creek. At nearby Wye River another 98 homes were destroyed. There were no deaths at either town.

== Geography and features ==
The village is situated at the mouth of the Separation Creek, on the Great Ocean Road, which follows the coast through the locality. There are no shops at Separation Creek; the nearest shop and hotel is located at Wye River, which is connected to the town by the Great Ocean Road and on foot by Paddys Path. In July 2014, the federal government announced a $4m upgrade of the Separation Creek bridge, with a new pedestrian walkway across the creek to allow for safer access between the towns.

The Wye River Separation Creek Progress Association is a local community organisation which aims to "advance the welfare and protect the environment" of the two towns. Singer Mike Brady has a beach house in the village.

Separation Creek has a 250m long beach, which is unpatrolled year-round. Surf Life Saving Australia describes the beach as "suitable for a picnic or fishing, but unsuitable for safe bathing". It gives the beach a hazard rating of 7/10 (highly hazardous).

The remainder of the locality, outside the township, is almost entirely covered today by the Great Otway National Park and the Otway Forest Park. There are only two inland roads through the locality outside the township itself: Wye Road runs inland from the coast, much of it forming the border with Wye River, and the Benwerrin-Mount Sabine Road runs roughly north–south around the western edge of the locality.

== See also ==
- Defiance Falls
