= Allambee Beek Falls =

Waterfall in Victoria, Australia

- Location within Victoria
- Location: Separation Creek, Victoria, Australia
- Coordinates: 38°35′16″S 143°49′40″E
- Type: Plunge
- Total height: 11.66 m (38.3 ft)
- Number of drops: 1
- Watercourse: Cumberland River

Allambee Beek Falls is a waterfall located in the Otway Ranges of Victoria, Australia, within the locality of Separation Creek. Situated on the Cumberland River, it consists of one drop at a height of 11.66 metres (38.3 ft).

== Description and access ==
The waterfall was named in 1992 by bushwalker and waterfall researcher Philip Larkin, with "Allambee Beek" reputedly meaning "to fall" or "to tumble down" in a Victorian Aboriginal language.

The waterfall can be reached by a unmaintained walking track marked by ribbons, branching off of Curtis Track.

== See also ==
- Amphitheatre Falls
- Galliebarinda Falls
- Carisbrook Falls
- Swallow Cave Falls
- Erskine Falls
- Sheoak Falls
- Skinner Creek Falls
- Wangerrip Falls
- Upper Chapple Falls
- Lower Kalimna Falls
- Lower Blanket Bay Falls
- Upper Blanket Bay Falls
