= Cumberland River (Victoria) =

Perennial river in Victoria, Australia

Cumberland
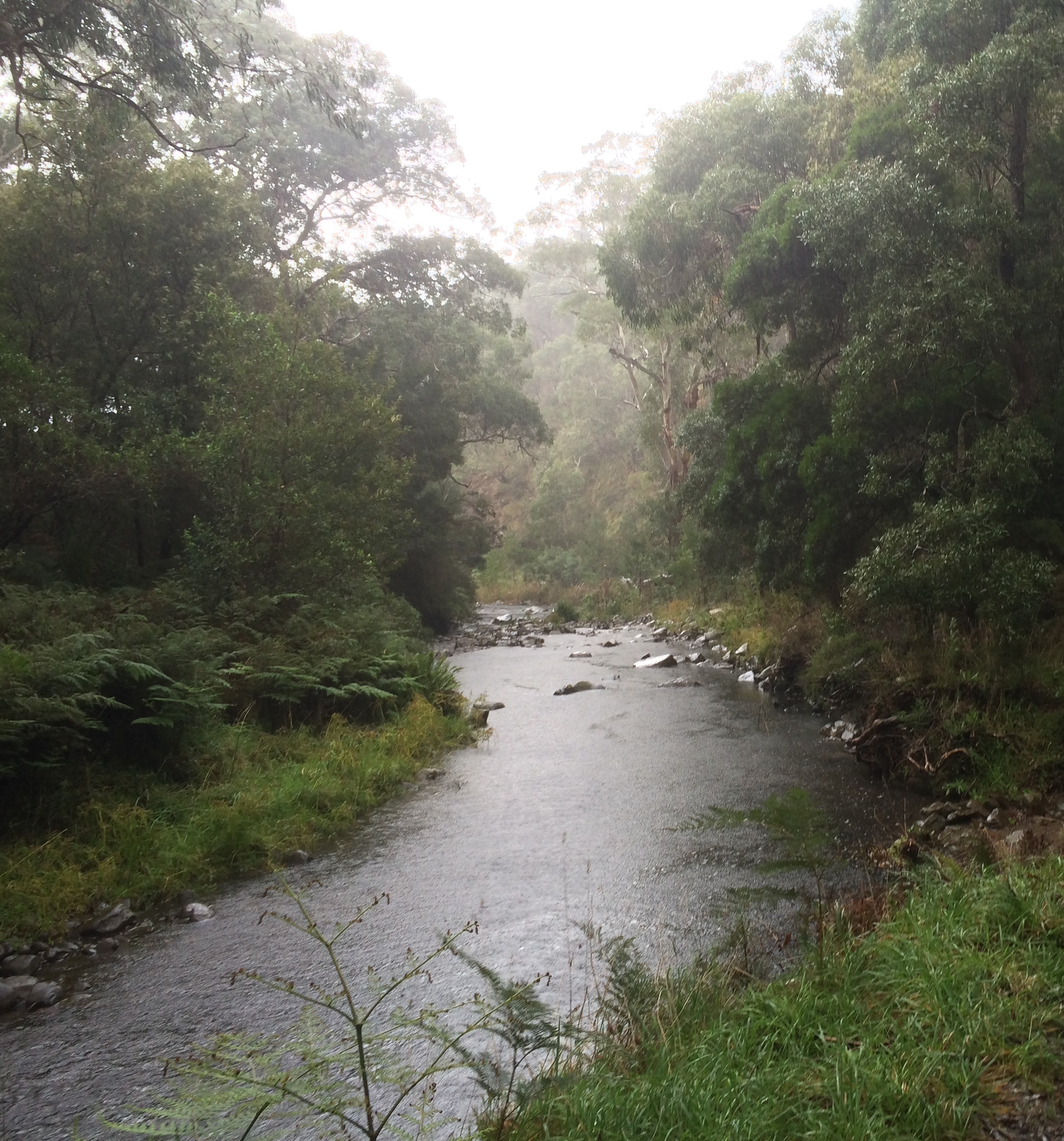
- The river 1km from its mouth

- Location of the Cumberland River mouth in Victoria
- Etymology: Duke of Cumberland; or the schooner Cumberland

Location
- Country: Australia
- State: Victoria
- Region: South East Coastal Plain (IBRA), The Otways
- Local government area: Surf Coast Shire, Colac Otway Shire

Physical characteristics
- Source: Otway Ranges
  - location: south of Mount Cowley
  - coordinates: 38°34′28″S 143°48′28″E
  - elevation: 532 m (1,745 ft)
- Mouth: Bass Strait
  - location: south of Lorne
  - coordinates: 38°34′35″S 143°56′57″E
  - elevation: 0 m (0 ft)
- Length: 20 km (12 mi)

Basin features
- River system: Corangamite catchment
- Tributaries
  - left: Garvey Creek
- National park: Great Otway National Park

The Cumberland River is a perennial river of the Corangamite catchment, in the Otways region of the Australian state of Victoria.

== Location and features ==
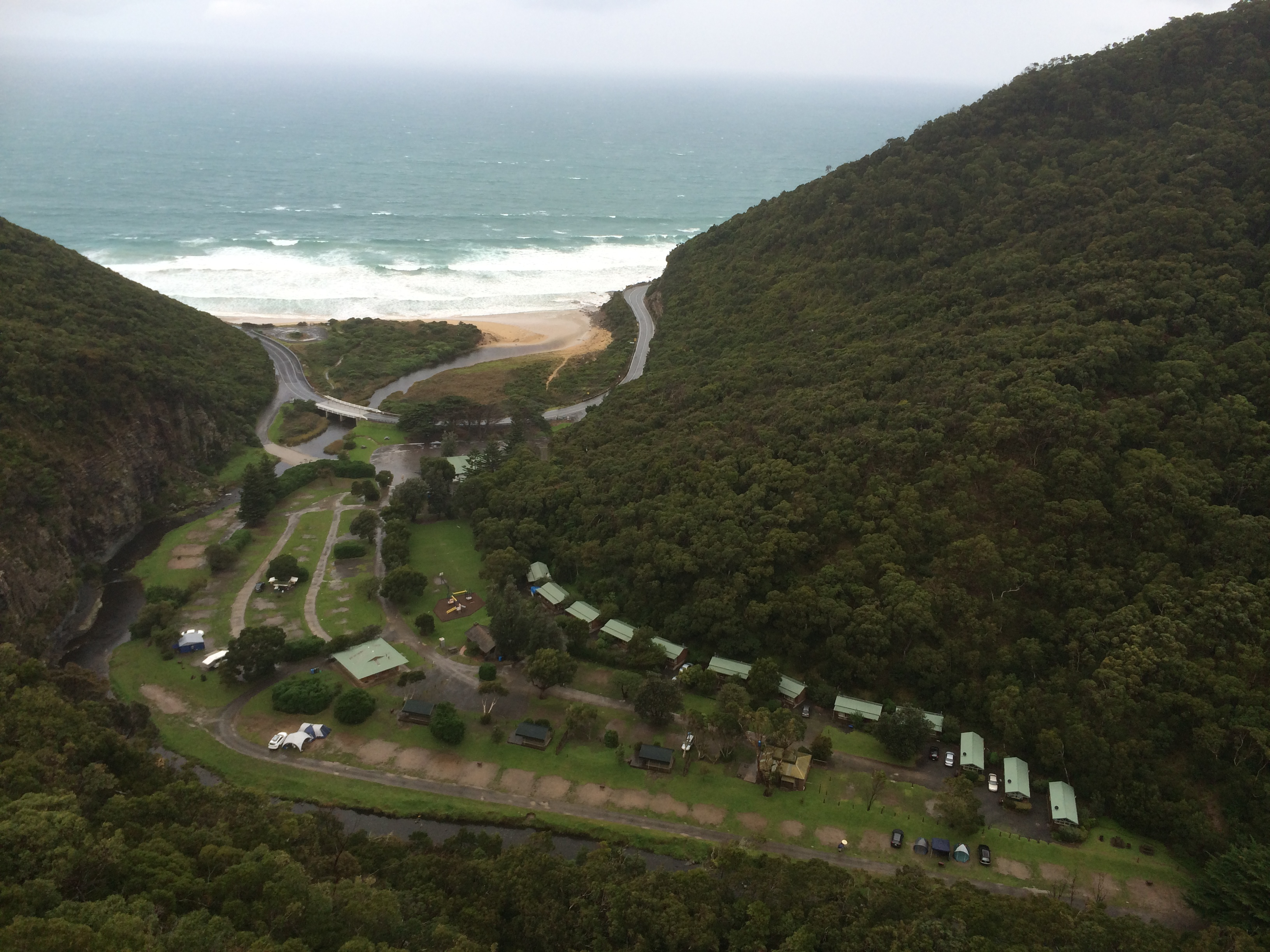
Cumberland River – Victoria – river mouth and camping ground. Photo taken from Castle Rock

The Cumberland River rises south of Mount Cowley and south-east of the Benwerrin-Mount Sabine Road in the Otway Ranges in southwest Victoria and flows generally east before turning south just above popular short walk destination Jebbs Pool, between the high cliffs of Langdale Pike and Castle Rock, then along the cliff side of Cumberland River Holiday Park between The Brothers and Mount Defiance where the river reaches its mouth, crossing near the edge of a 200 metres (660 ft) sandy surf beach, and empties into Bass Strait, northeast of Wye River, Victoria and to the south of Lorne. From its highest point, the river descends 532 metres (1,745 ft) over its 20-kilometre (12 mi) course.

== Etymology ==
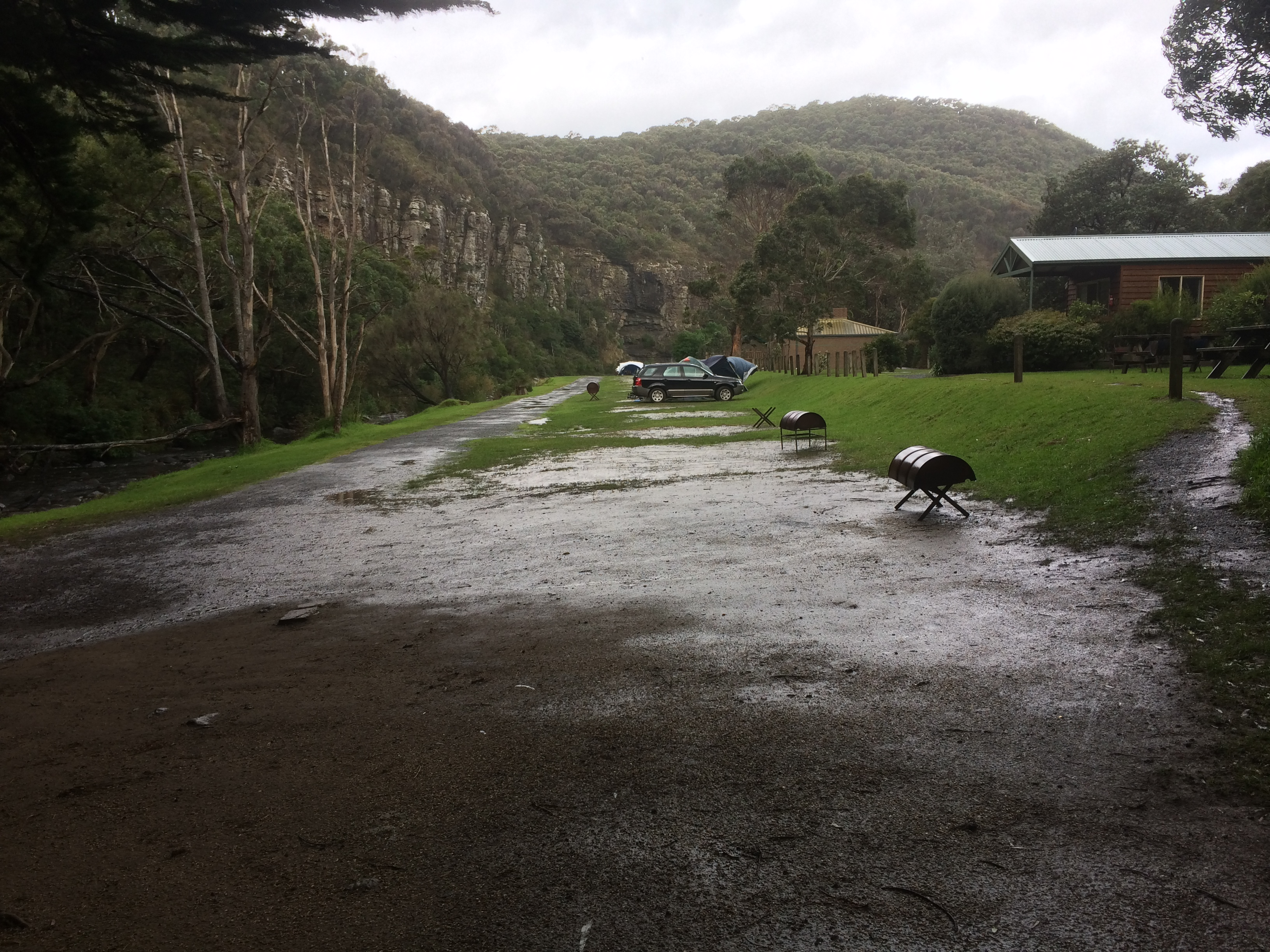
Cumberland river looking south showing cliffs beside river

The river was probably named by surveyor George Smythe in 1846, either for the Duke of Cumberland or for the schooner Cumberland in which Charles Grimes explored Port Phillip and King Island in 1802 – 03.

== See also ==
- List of rivers of Australia § Victoria
