= Galliebarinda Falls =

Waterfall in Victoria, Australia

- Galliebarinda Falls

- Location within Victoria
- Location: Separation Creek, Victoria, Australia
- Coordinates: 38°34′49″S 143°50′52″E
- Type: Plunge
- Total height: 3.08 m (10.1 ft)
- Number of drops: 1
- Watercourse: Cumberland River

Galliebarinda Falls (historically known as Zara Falls) is a waterfall located on the Cumberland River in the Otway Ranges, within the locality of Separation Creek, Victoria, Australia. The wide waterfall consists of a single tier, at a height of 3.08 metres (10.1 ft).

== Description and access ==
The waterfall was first named by Hugh Riordan in 1908, calling it Zara Falls. They were later renamed Galliebarinda Falls by bushwalker Philip Larkin.

The waterfall can be reached by an unmaintained walking track marked by pink ribbons, that branches off from Curtis Track.

The waterfall as seen from further downstream

== See also ==
- Brunswick Falls
- Carisbrook Falls
- Swallow Cave Falls
- Erskine Falls
- Sheoak Falls
- Wild Dog Falls
- Lower Kalimna Falls
- Lower Johanna Falls
