= Sheoak Falls =

Waterfall in Victoria, Australia

- Sheoak Falls

- Location within Victoria
- Location: Lorne, Victoria, Australia
- Coordinates: 38°33′55″S 143°57′46″E
- Type: Plunge
- Total height: 15.76 m (51.7 ft)
- Number of drops: 1
- Watercourse: Sheoak Creek

Sheoak Falls is a waterfall located on Sheoak Creek, adjacent to the Great Ocean Road, approximately 6km outside of Lorne, Victoria, Australia. The waterfall consists of a single tier, with a total height of 15.76 metres.

== Etymology and history ==
Both the creek and the waterfall are named after the sheoak tree. By the 1880s the waterfall had become a popular tourist site, with the area also becoming a picnic spot.

In December 1948, Frank White, who was on a fishing trip with friends Alan and Alma Simmons, was killed after a plug of gelignite the group were trying to use to stun fish in the creek blew up. Alan was seriously injured, but survived, and Alma was unharmed as she had backed away before the explosion.

== Access ==
A car park adjacent to the Great Ocean Road marks the start of a walking track that leads to the waterfall. Another path on the hill beside the waterfall leads to Swallow Cave Falls.

== See also ==
- Carisbrook Falls
- Currawong Falls
- Cumberland Falls
- Cora Lynn Falls
- Erskine Falls
- Henderson Falls
- Upper Kalimna Falls
- Lower Kalimna Falls
