= Lower Kalimna Falls =

Waterfall in Victoria, Australia

- Lower Kalimna Falls

- Location within Victoria
- Location: Lorne, Victoria, Australia
- Coordinates: 38°33′37″S 143°55′05″E
- Type: Plunge
- Total height: 6.98 m (22.9 ft)
- Number of drops: 1
- Watercourse: Kalimna Creek

Lower Kalimna Falls is a waterfall located in the Otway Ranges, outside of Lorne, Victoria, Australia. The waterfall, comprising a single tier with a total height of 6.98 metres, is one of several waterfalls along the Great Ocean Road.

== Description, history and access ==
Both Lower and Upper Kalimna Falls have been tourist destinations since at least the early 1900s. "Kalimna", an Aboriginal word, reputedly means "beautiful". The waterfall has carved a cave at its base, additionally creating a deep pool. The width of the waterfall is also determined by the flow rate.

From the Sheoak Picnic Ground, a 2.9-kilometre track leads to the waterfall, with a further 1.2-kilometre track to the Upper Kalimna Falls.

== See also ==
- Avalanche Falls
- Erskine Falls
- Sheoak Falls
- Henderson Falls
- Winterbrook Falls
- Upper Parker River Falls
- Lower Blanket Bay Falls
