= Swallow Cave Falls =

Waterfall in Victoria, Australia

- Swallow Cave Falls

- Location within Victoria
- Location: Pennyroyal, Victoria, Australia
- Coordinates: 38°33′57″S 143°57′39″E
- Type: Plunge
- Total height: 22.24 m (73.0 ft)
- Number of drops: 4
- Watercourse: Sheoak Creek

Swallow Cave Falls is a waterfall and cave located beside the Great Ocean Road, immediately outside of Lorne, Victoria, Australia. The waterfall consists of 4 tiers, measuring 4.37 metres, 8.33 metres, 7.16 metres and 2.38 metres respectively. Combined, the waterfall is a total height of 22.24 metres. The cave takes its name from the swallows that shelter in the cave.

== Geology ==
The cave contains instances of honeycomb weathering, which have been weathered into the Jurassic sandstone. Silt then subsequently washed into the cave around 50 to 100 million years ago, and then, with pressure over time, created a firm rock around the base. Iron oxides then intermingled with the rock, creating the honeycomb pattern, with wind and water erosion removing the cells in between the webbing.

The cave

== Access ==
Access can be reached from a car park adjacent to the Great Ocean Road, where a walking track leads from the car park past Sheoak Falls, with a track then leading up the hill to the waterfall and cave. In times of flood it is not recommended to traverse the stepping stones across Sheoak Creek.

== See also ==
- Carisbrook Falls
- Erskine Falls
- Yannathan Falls
