= Carisbrook Falls =

Waterfall in Victoria, Australia

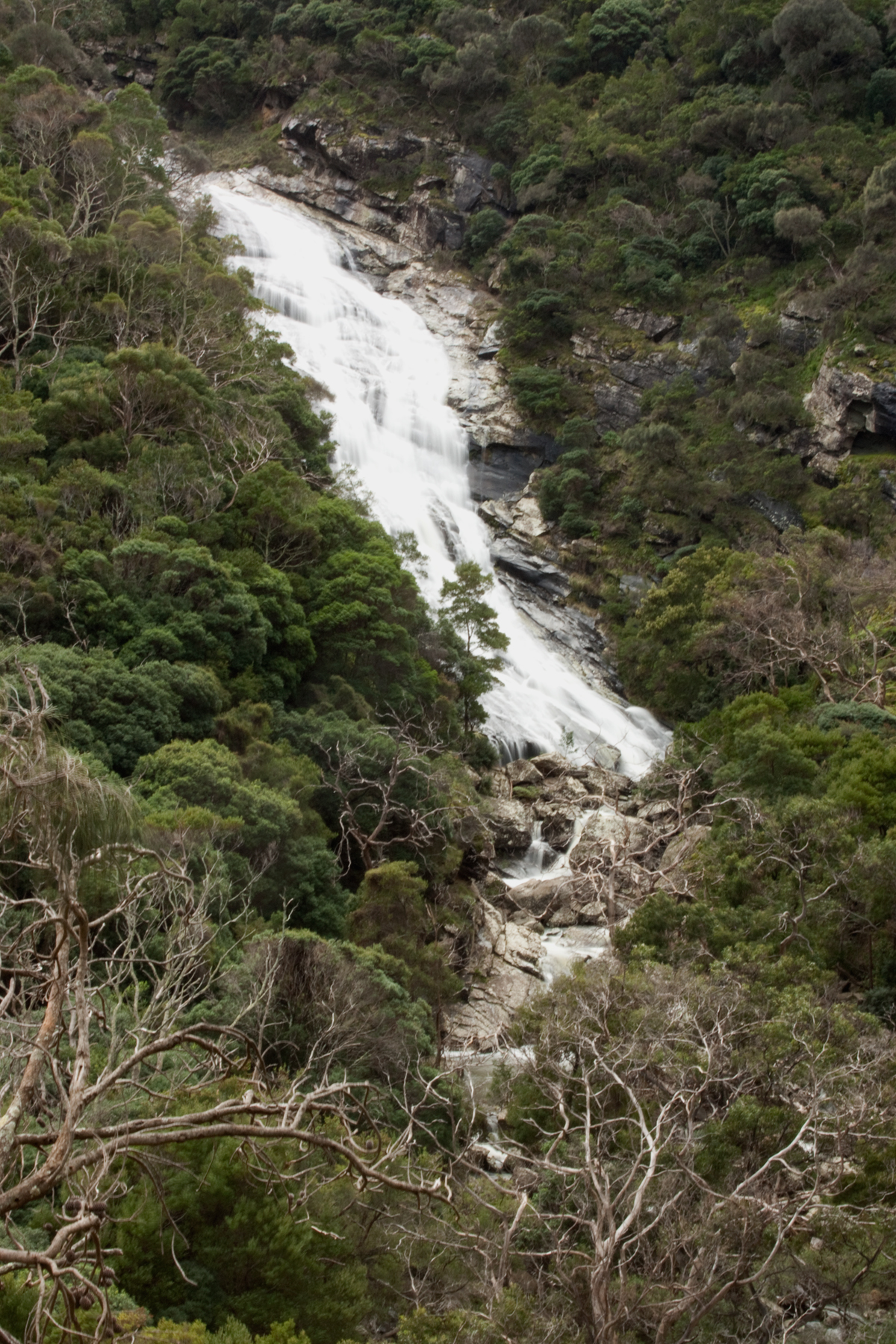
- Carisbrook Falls

- Location within Victoria
- Location: Wongarra, Victoria, Australia
- Coordinates: 38°41′12″S 143°48′33″E
- Type: Plunge
- Total height: 137.73 m (451.9 ft)
- Number of drops: 8
- Watercourse: Carisbrook Creek

Carisbrook Falls is a waterfall located within the Otway Ranges, within the locality of Wongarra, Victoria, Australia. The waterfall consists of 8 drops, and with a combined total heigh of 137.73 metres (451.9ft), it is the tallest waterfall in the Otway Ranges.

== Geology and description ==
Carisbrook Creek flows across exposed beds of marine arkose that dip downstream at 15° to 25°. This intersection creates a series of rapids, cascades, and small waterfalls that fall across a 500-metre distance, with structural controls dictating the gorge's configuration and influencing the formation of potholes and incised channels.

The 8 drops respectively measure at the heights of 8.20 m (26.9 ft), 18.18 m (59.6 ft), 16.91 m (55.5 ft), 5.12 m (16.8 ft), 19.99 m (65.6 ft), 7.34 m (24.1 ft), 7.98 m (26.2 ft), and 54 m (177 ft).

== Access ==
A car park accessible immediately off the Great Ocean Road, marks the start of a moderately steep, short track that leads to a viewing platform of the waterfall.

== See also ==
- Brunswick Falls
- Erskine Falls
- Great Ocean Road
- Hopetoun Falls
- List of waterfalls
- List of waterfalls in Australia
- Marriners Falls
- Sabine Falls
- Triplet Falls
- Upper Johanna Falls
- Twelve Apostles
