= Erskine Falls =

Waterfall in Victoria, Australia

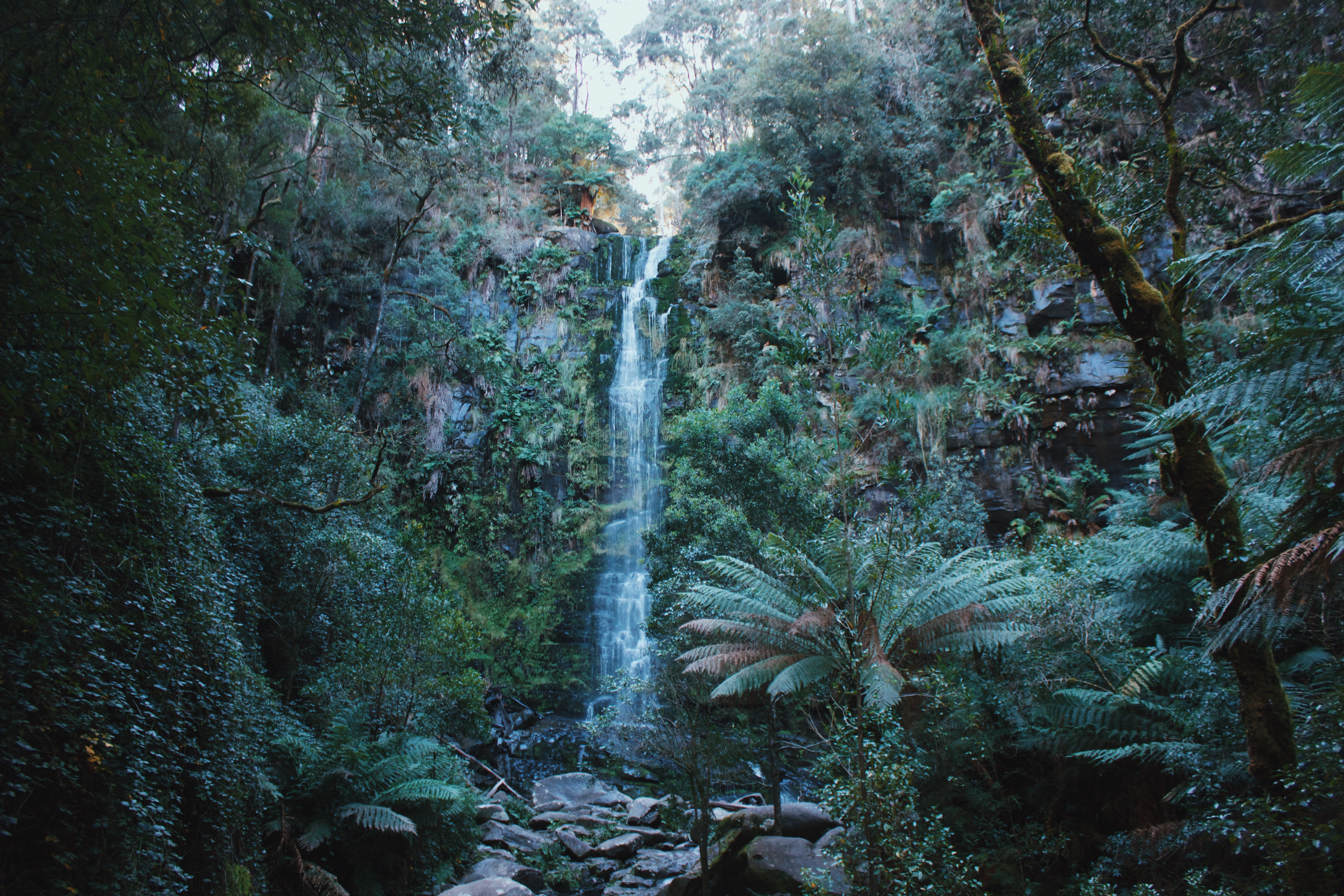
- Erskine Falls, 2017

- Location within Victoria
- Location: Lorne, Victoria, Australia
- Coordinates: 38°30′24″S 143°54′49″E
- Type: Plunge
- Total height: 35.49 m (116.4 ft)
- Number of drops: 1
- Watercourse: Erskine River

Erskine Falls is a waterfall located in the Otway Ranges, immediately outside of Lorne, Victoria, Australia. It is a popular waterfall in the Otways, due to its close proximity to Lorne and the Great Ocean Road. The waterfall consists of a singular drop, reaching a height of 35.49 metres (116.44 feet). Both the waterfall and the river it is situated on are named after the Hon. James Augustus Erskine (1812–1885).

== History ==
The waterfalls were first discovered in 1876 by a trio of men including William Allin Mountjoy, Frederick Straw and Harry Jebb, after they had discovered Splitter Falls downstream. Prior to the construction of a road, access to the waterfall was limited to a walking track from Lorne. In 1937, a road to the waterfall was completed.

== See also ==
- Great Ocean Road
- Hopetoun Falls
- List of waterfalls
- List of waterfalls in Australia
- Henderson Falls
- Marriners Falls
- Sabine Falls
- Splitters Falls
- Stevensons Falls
- Straw Falls
- Urquharts Falls
- Triplet Falls
- Wanliss Falls
- Twelve Apostles
