= List of places of worship in Colac Otway Shire =

This is a list of places of worship in the Shire of Colac Otway, a local government area in the state of Victoria, Australia. The list includes active and former churches and other religious buildings representing a variety of Christian denominations and other faiths.

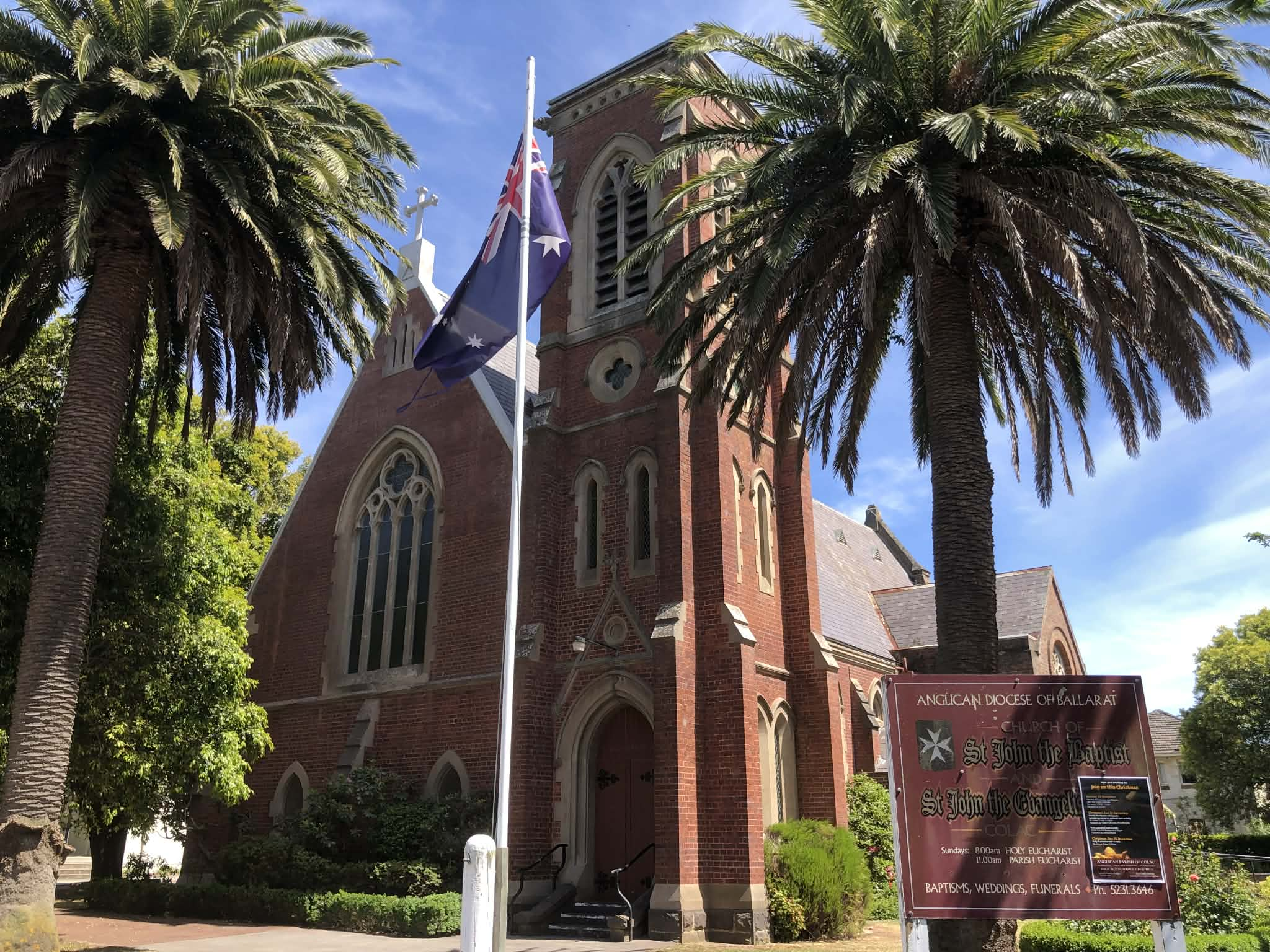
Ss Johns' Anglican Church, Colac

== Heritage listing status ==
Style	Status
Yes	Listed on the Victorian Heritage Register
–	Not listed

== Current places of worship ==
Current places of worship
Name	Image	Location	Denomination/ Affiliation	Heritage listing	Notes	Refs
St Mary's Catholic Church		Colac; 38.334012°S 143.586138°E	Catholic	–		
St Andrew's (Colac) Uniting Church		Colac; 38.336750°S 143.589157°E	Uniting (formerly Presbyterian)	Yes		
Ss Johns' Anglican Church		Colac; 38.335656°S 143.589138°E	Anglican	Yes		
Colac Baptist Church		Colac; 38.338166°S 143.589292°E	Baptist	–		
Gateway Christian Church (Colac Apostolic Church)		Colac; 38.336639°S 143.587248°E	Apostolic (formerly Bible Christian)	–		
Colac Seventh-day Adventist Church		Colac; 38.336891°S 143.591207°E	Seventh-day Adventist	–		
Scots Presbyterian Church		Colac; 38.344501°S 143.575719°E	Presbyterian	–		
Christian Family Church		Colac; 38.340532°S 143.568550°E	Pentecostal/Charismatic	–		
South West Family Church		Colac; 38.336696°S 143.562344°E	Apostolic	–		
Synergy Christian Church		Elliminyt; 38.362994°S 143.582961°E	Pentecostal	–		
Christ Church, Birregurra		Birregurra; 38.341859°S 143.787143°E	Anglican	Yes		
Birregurra Uniting Church		Birregurra; 38.340255°S 143.789457°E	Uniting (formerly Presbyterian)	–		
St Peter's Catholic Church		Birregurra; 38.340908°S 143.788094°E	Catholic	–		
St Andrew's (Cressy) Uniting Church		Cressy; 38.030976°S 143.633579°E	Uniting (formerly Presbyterian)	–		
St Joseph's Memorial Catholic Church		Cressy; 38.033082°S 143.631130°E	Catholic	–		
St Andrew's Anglican Church		Alvie; 38.243714°S 143.511674°E	Anglican	–		
St Brendan's Catholic Church		Coragulac; 38.270925°S 143.517832°E	Catholic	–		
St Joseph's Catholic Church, Pirron Yallock		Pirron Yallock; 38.350175°S 143.431862°E	Catholic	–		
St Aidan's Anglican Church		Apollo Bay; 38.759791°S 143.671352°E	Anglican	Yes		
Our Lady Star of the Sea Catholic Church		Apollo Bay; 38.760171°S 143.674068°E	Catholic	–		
St Andrew's Uniting Church, Apollo Bay		Apollo Bay; 38.759276°S 143.666835°E	Uniting (formerly Presbyterian)	–		
Christ the King Anglican Church		Carlisle River; 38.559820°S 143.394988°E	Anglican	–		
St Anselm's Anglican Church		Beech Forest; 38.636160°S 143.569975°E	Anglican	–		

== Former places of worship ==
Former places of worship
Name	Image	Location	Denomination/ Affiliation	Heritage listing	Notes	Refs
Nalangil Uniting Church		Nalangil; 38.345411°S 143.456066°E	Uniting (formerly Presbyterian)	–		
Apollo Bay Methodist Church		Apollo Bay; 38.757718°S 143.667980°E	Methodist	Non-existent		
Colac (Wesleyan) Uniting Church		Colac; 38.337813°S 143.582047°E	Uniting (formerly Methodist)	–		
Birregurra (Wesleyan) Methodist Church		Birregurra; 38.339244°S 143.787330°E	Methodist	Yes		
Elliminyt Uniting Church		Elliminyt; 38.360354°S 143.583411°E	Uniting (formerly Methodist)	–		
St David's Uniting Church, Cororooke		Cororooke; 38.289519°S 143.522745°E	Uniting (formerly Presbyterian)	–		
Warrion Uniting Church		Warrion; 38.225050°S 143.569937°E	Uniting (formerly Presbyterian)	–		
St Andrew's Uniting Church, Beeac		Beeac; 38.194568°S 143.639961°E	Uniting (formerly Presbyterian)	–		
St Michael's Catholic Church		Beeac; 38.201098°S 143.640627°E	Catholic	–		
St Augustine's Anglican Church		Beeac; 38.199828°S 143.639657°E	Anglican	–		
St James' Anglican Church		Forrest; 38.517480°S 143.714470°E	Anglican	–		
Sacred Heart Catholic Church		Lavers Hill; 38.681393°S 143.383881°E	Catholic	–		
St Joseph's Catholic Church, Barwon Downs		Barwon Downs; 38.467802°S 143.758547°E	Catholic	–		
Barwon Downs Uniting Church		Barwon Downs; 38.468693°S 143.762266°E	Uniting (formerly Presbyterian)	–		
Beeac Methodist Church		Beeac; 38.198461°S 143.639793°E	Methodist	Non-existent		
Barongarook Methodist Church		Barongarook; 38.425207°S 143.609566°E	Methodist	–		
Forrest Methodist Church		Forrest; 38.521391°S 143.715997°E	Methodist	Non-existent		
St Joseph's Catholic Church, Forrest		Forrest; 38.515009°S 143.714933°E	Catholic	–		
Gellibrand Anglican/Methodist Church		Gellibrand; 38.519722°S 143.538316°E	Anglican/Methodist	–		
Gellibrand Catholic Church		Gellibrand; 38.523461°S 143.539385°E	Catholic	–		
Lavers Hill Presbyterian Church		Lavers Hill; 38.682905°S 143.388342°E	Presbyterian	Non-existent		
Alvie Presbyterian Church		Alvie; 38.242572°S 143.514727°E	Presbyterian	Non-existent		
Irrewillipe Uniting Church		Irrewillipe; 38.410695°S 143.445600°E	Uniting (formerly Methodist (Bible Christian))	–		
Gerangamete Methodist Church		Gerangamete; 38.457382°S 143.684189°E	Methodist	–		

== See also ==
- List of places of worship in Golden Plains Shire
- List of places of worship in the City of Greater Geelong
