= Shire of Colac =

Coordinates: 38°17′S 143°38′E

Shire of Colac Victoria
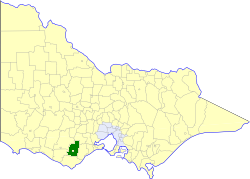
- Location in Victoria
- The Shire of Colac as at its dissolution in 1994
- Population: 7,230 (1992)
  - Density: 4.958/km^{2} (12.842/sq mi)
- Established: 1859
- Area: 1,458.2 km^{2} (563.0 sq mi)
- Council seat: Colac
- Region: Barwon South West
- County: Polwarth, Grenville
LGAs around Shire of Colac:
Hampden	Leigh	Leigh
Hampden	Shire of Colac	Winchelsea
Heytesbury	Otway	Winchelsea

The Shire of Colac was a local government area about 150 kilometres (93 mi) west-southwest of Melbourne, the state capital of Victoria, Australia. The shire covered an area of 1,458.2 square kilometres (563.0 sq mi), and existed from 1859 until 1994.

== History ==
Colac was first incorporated as a road district on 11 May 1859, and became a shire on 10 May 1864. On 31 May 1901, it was divided into four ridings, although these were later abolished. A significant portion of the shire, along with the Shires of Heytesbury and Winchelsea, seceded on 6 May 1919, to form the Shire of Otway. On 19 January 1938, the town of Colac itself split away, to form the Borough of Colac, later proclaimed on the 26 January 1960 as the City of Colac.

On 23 September 1994, the Shire of Colac was abolished, and along with the City of Colac, the Shire of Otway and parts of the Shires of Heytesbury and Winchelsea, was merged into the newly created Shire of Colac Otway.

== Towns and localities ==
- Alvie
- Balintore
- Barongarook
- Beeac
- Coragulac
- Cororooke
- Cressy
- Cundare
- Dreeite
- Elliminyt
- Eurack
- Gerangamete
- Irrewarra
- Irrewillipe
- Kawarren
- Larpent
- Nalangil
- Ondit
- Pirron Yallock
- Swan Marsh
- Warncoort
- Warrion
- Wool Wool
- Yeo
- Yeodene

== Population ==
Year	Population
1954	6,963
1958	7,060*
1961	7,326
1966	6,956
1971	6,264
1976	6,160
1981	6,161
1986	6,429
1991	6,793

* Estimate in the 1958 Victorian Year Book.
