= Gellibrand, Victoria =

Gellibrand
- Town
- Coordinates: 38°31′30″S 143°42′25″E
- Country: Australia
- State: Victoria
- LGA: Colac Otway Shire
- Location: 176 km (109 mi) SW of Melbourne; 100 km (62 mi) W of Geelong; 25 km (16 mi) S of Colac

Government
  - State electorate: Polwarth
  - Federal division: Wannon

Population
  - Total: 210 (2016 census)
- Postcode: 3239
Localities around Gellibrand
Irrewillipe East	Barongarook West; Kawarren	Kawarren
Irrewillipe	Gellibrand	Barramunga
Beech Forest	Beech Forest	Carlisle River

Gellibrand (pron: JEL-ee-brand) is a town in south west Victoria, Australia. The town is located in the Otway Ranges midway between the Princes Highway and Great Ocean Road in the Colac Otway Shire, 176 kilometres (109 mi) south west of the state capital, Melbourne. At the 2016 census, Gellibrand had a population of 210. Gellibrand is home to the Otway Districts Demons Football and Netball Club, who play Australian Rules Football and participate in the Colac & District Football League.

Gellibrand was named after Joseph Gellibrand, the first attorney-general of Van Diemen's Land (Tasmania) and an early European settler in Victoria.

Gellibrand is positioned close to the Gellibrand River, with tourist attractions including fishing, access to the Old Beechy Rail Trail for cycling, walking, and horse-riding, and proximity to many of the Otway Ranges' walks and waterfalls. The Great Victorian Bike Ride had an overnight stay in Gellibrand in 2004 when a record 8,100 riders took part.

Gellibrand Primary School opened on 15 June 1881 and closed on 31 March 1994, when it merged into the Lavers Hill P-12 College along with Kawarren Primary School and Barongarook Primary School. The Gellibrand River Post Office opened on 22 January 1898 and became a licensed post office on 23 March 1993.
