= Beech Forest, Victoria =

Beech Forest
- Town
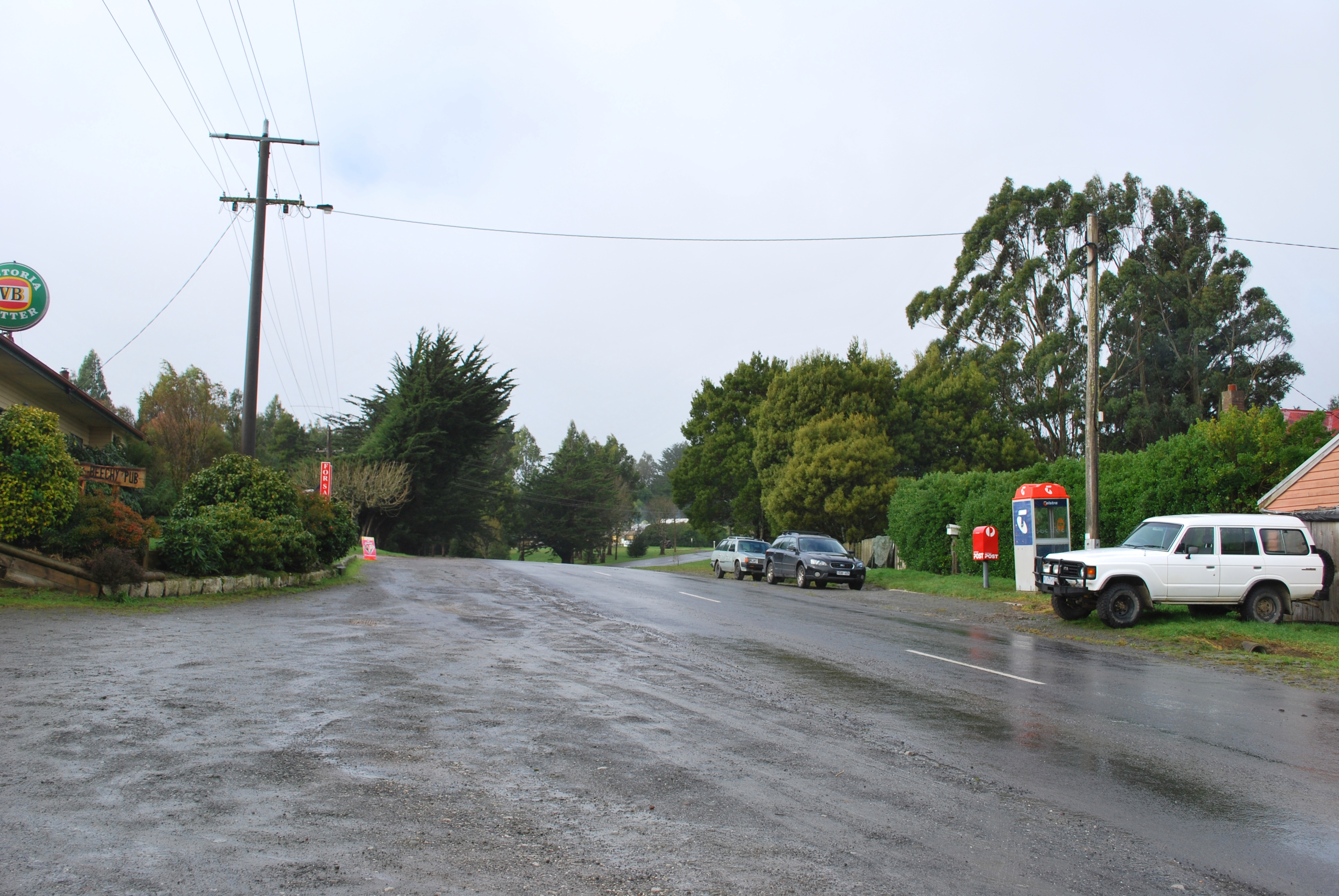
- Main street

- Coordinates: 38°38′0″S 143°34′0″E
- Country: Australia
- State: Victoria
- LGA: Colac Otway Shire
- Location: 193 km (120 mi) SW of Melbourne; 43 km (27 mi) S of Colac

Government
  - State electorate: Polwarth
  - Federal division: Wannon

Population
  - Total: 125 (SAL 2021)
- Postcode: 3237
Localities around Beech Forest
Carlisle River	Gellibrand	Barramunga
Ferguson; Wyelangta	Beech Forest	Tanybryn
Glenaire	Aire Valley	Apollo Bay

Beech Forest is a town in Victoria, Australia. The area of Beech Forest is largely used for potato farming.

== History ==
The town was named after the many myrtle beech trees of the area.

Beech Forest Post Office opened on 10 May 1890 and closed in 1994.

Beech Forest Primary School opened on 29 July 1895 as Weeaproinah State School. It briefly closed in October 1900 after being unable to continue to lease the rented school building and reopened in another building "on the main Otway Ridge" in 1901. The second building burned down around 1910, at which time it moved to its final, permanent site and changed its name to Beech Forest. Many families shifted to the Lavers Hill Consolidated School when it opened in 1953; however, the school remained open as a number of Beech Forest parents refused to move. The school closed on 1 January 1981.

The town had a railway station on the Crowes railway line from 1902 until 1962. Much of the route of the old railway has been converted to the Old Beechy Rail Trail, via which cyclists and walkers can travel 45 kilometres (28 mi) between Beech Forest and Colac.

== Notable residents ==
- Cliff Young, winner of the 1983 Westfield Sydney to Melbourne Ultra Marathon at the age of 61
