= City of Colac =

Coordinates: 38°20′S 143°35′E

City of Colac Victoria
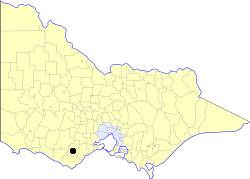
- Location in Victoria
- The extent of the City of Colac
- Population: 9,990 (1992)
  - Density: 918.2/km^{2} (2,378.1/sq mi)
- Established: 1938
- Area: 10.88 km^{2} (4.2 sq mi)
- Council seat: Colac
- Region: Barwon South West
- County: Polwarth

The City of Colac was a local government area about 150 kilometres (93 mi) west-southwest of Melbourne, the state capital of Victoria, Australia. The city covered an area of 10.88 square kilometres (4.2 sq mi), and existed from 1938 until 1994. Its area was surrounded by the separate and largely rural Shire of Colac.

== History ==
Colac was originally part of the Shire of Colac, which was first incorporated as a road district on 11 May 1859, and became a shire on 10 May 1864. On 19 January 1938, the Colac Riding severed and became a self-governing borough, which then became a town on 26 May 1948. It was proclaimed as a city on 26 January 1960.

On 23 September 1994, the City of Colac was abolished, and along with the Shires of Colac and Otway, and parts of the Shires of Heytesbury and Winchelsea, was merged into the newly created Colac-Otway Shire.

=== Wards ===
The City of Colac was not subdivided into wards, and its seven councillors represented the entire area.

== Population ==
Year	Population
1954	8,032
1958	8,940*
1961	9,252
1966	9,497
1971	9,679
1976	9,582
1981	9,666
1986	9,532
1991	9,171

* Estimate in the 1958 Victorian Year Book.
