= Colac Botanic Gardens =

Botanical garden in Colac, Victoria, Australia

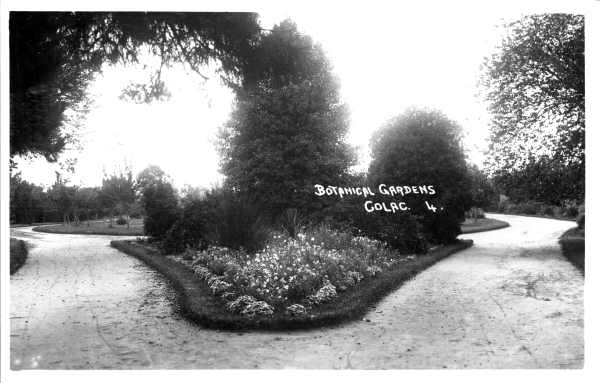
- Colac Botanic Gardens in 1908
- Interactive map of Colac Botanic Gardens
- Type: Botanical
- Location: Colac, Victoria
- Coordinates: 38.3329°S 143.5910°E
- Opened: 1868
- Owner: Colac Otway Shire

The Colac Botanic Gardens is a regional botanical garden, located at the corner of Fyans and Gellibrand streets, on the shores of Lake Colac in Colac, Victoria, Australia. Land was allocated in 1865, with the garden being established in 1868 by Daniel Bunce, and later remodelled in 1910 by Melbourne Botanical Gardens director William Guilfoyle.

The Colac Botanic Gardens covers fifteen hectares, and contains over a thousand specimens (more than any other provincial garden in Victoria). The garden hosts variations of trees such as bunya bunya pine (Araucaria bidwillii), black matipo (Pittosporum tenuifolium), firewheel tree (Stenocarpus sinuatus), bird plant (Crotalaria agatiflora) and Tecate cypress (Cupressus forbesii). Several trees in the garden have been placed on the Victorian Significant Tree Register.

The gardens are listed on the Victorian Heritage Register.
