= List of places on the Victorian Heritage Register in the Shire of Colac Otway =

This is a list of places on the Victorian Heritage Register in the Shire of Colac Otway in Victoria, Australia. The Victorian Heritage Register is maintained by the Heritage Council of Victoria.

The Victorian Heritage Register, as of 2020, lists the following 11 state-registered places within the Shire of Colac Otway:

Place name	Place #	Location	Suburb or Town	Co-ordinates	Built	State registered	Photo
Eurack Avenue of Honour	H2102	Eurack Rd	Eurack	38.147140°S 143.705870°E	1916	15 June 2006	
Cape Otway Lighthouse	H1222	1140 Lighthouse Rd	Cape Otway	38.854040°S 143.509740°E	1846-48	21 November 1996	
Colac Botanic Gardens	H2259	1-5 Fyans St	Colac	38.332120°S 143.590470°E	c. 1868	9 December 2010	
Adam Rea's Store	H0433	1 Murray St	Colac	38.339220°S 143.592110°E	1868	21 June 1978	
Great Ocean Road	H2261	Great Ocean Road	through the width of the shire from Separation Creek in the east past Yuulong in the west		1877	18 September 1997	
Henry's No. 1 Mill	H1815	West Barwon Track	Barramunga	38.586240°S 143.737230°E	1904	17 June 1999	
Henry's Tramway Tunnel	H1817	off West Barwon Track	Barramunga	38.588720°S 143.749990°E	1911	17 June 1999	
Knott's No. 3 Mill	H1818	Otway State Forest	Wyelangta	38.679540°S 143.475320°E	1922	17 June 1999	
Mount Hesse Station	H1208	155-159 Mount Hesse Estate Rd	Ombersley	38.161610°S 143.774290°E	1840s	24 October 1996	
Pirron Yallock railway station	H1584	2 Station Rd	Pirron Yallock	38.364630°S 143.421480°E	1894	20 August 1982	
Tarndwarncoort	H0281	37 Roseneath Rd	Warncoort	38.317680°S 143.709320°E	1848-49	9 October 1974	
