= Swan Marsh =

Swan Marsh Victoria
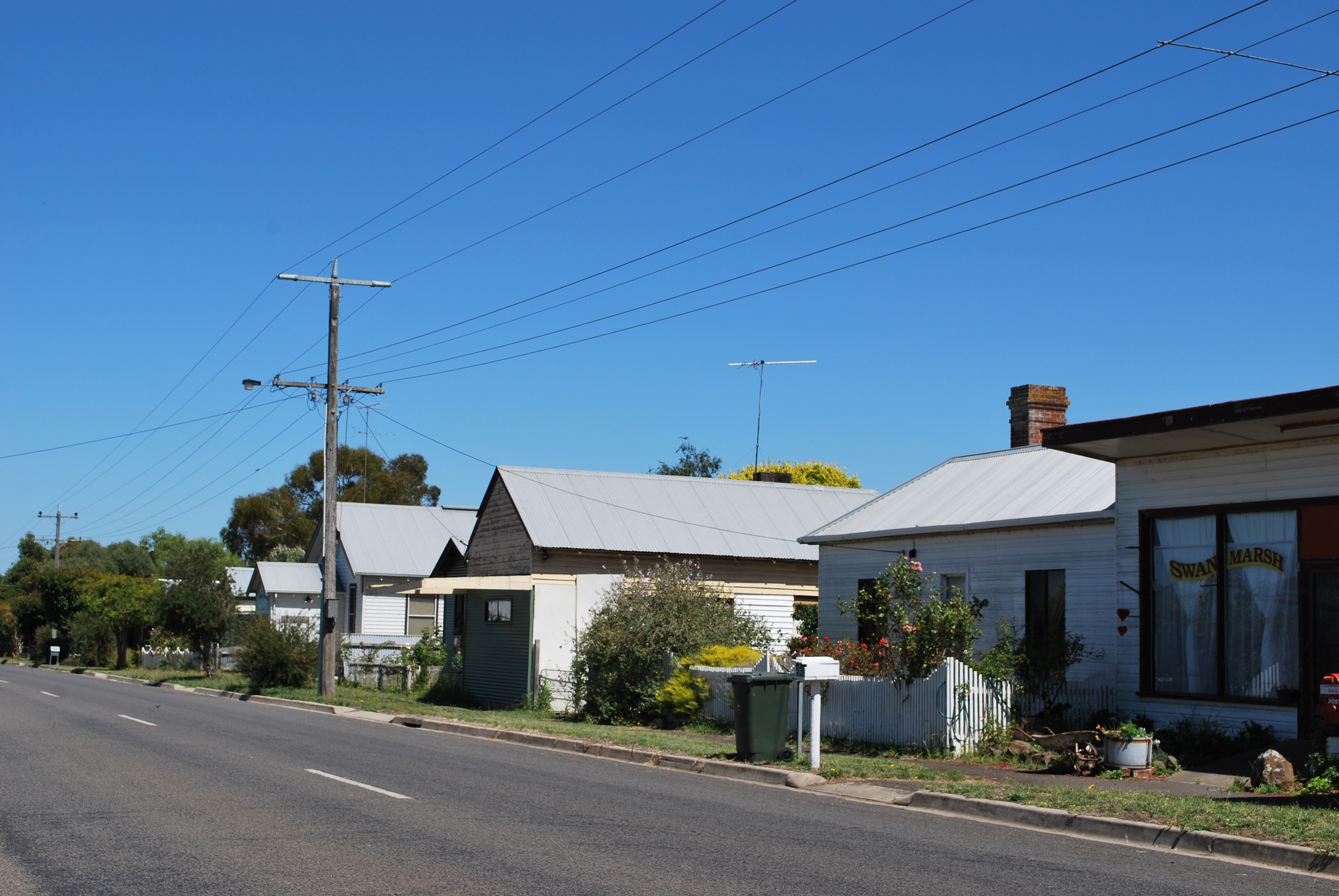
- Main street

- Coordinates: 38°22′0″S 143°23′0″E
- Population: 121 (2016 census)
- Postcode(s): 3249
- Location: 168 km (104 mi) SW of Melbourne; 94 km (58 mi) W of Geelong; 19 km (12 mi) W of Colac
- LGA(s): Colac Otway Shire
- State electorate(s): Polwarth
- Federal division(s): Wannon
Localities around Swan Marsh:
Stonyford	Stonyford; Pirron Yallock	Pirron Yallock
Carpendeit	Swan Marsh	Pirron Yallock
Carpendeit	Bungador	Irrewillipe

Swan Marsh is a town in the Western District of Victoria, Australia. The town is located in the Colac Otway Shire local government area, 168 kilometres (104 mi) south west of the state capital, Melbourne.

The area around Swan Marsh was first settled by Europeans in the mid 19th century. The area was described as ""wet, marshy land, forest and some beautiful cleared rich gently sloping high land." The swamps were drained using bullock teams and hand labour to install large drains—the beginnings of the Tirrengower Drainage Scheme. The name "Swan Marsh" was derived from the swans prevalent in the local area. In 1907, the area saw closer settlement with 60-acre (24 ha) blocks created and allocated mainly to young families. The Swan Marsh dairy, operated by the Colac and District Company, was built in 1901. From the 1930s to its closure in 1956, the dairy produced casein.

Swan Marsh today has four businesses: the post office, the general store/take away food outlet, a peat mine and a water carter. Community facilities include the football ground/recreation reserve, public hall, tennis courts and a speedway circuit. The town hosts a Country Fire Authority volunteer brigade. Swan Marsh Primary School services the town.
