= Ferguson, Victoria =

Ferguson
- Town
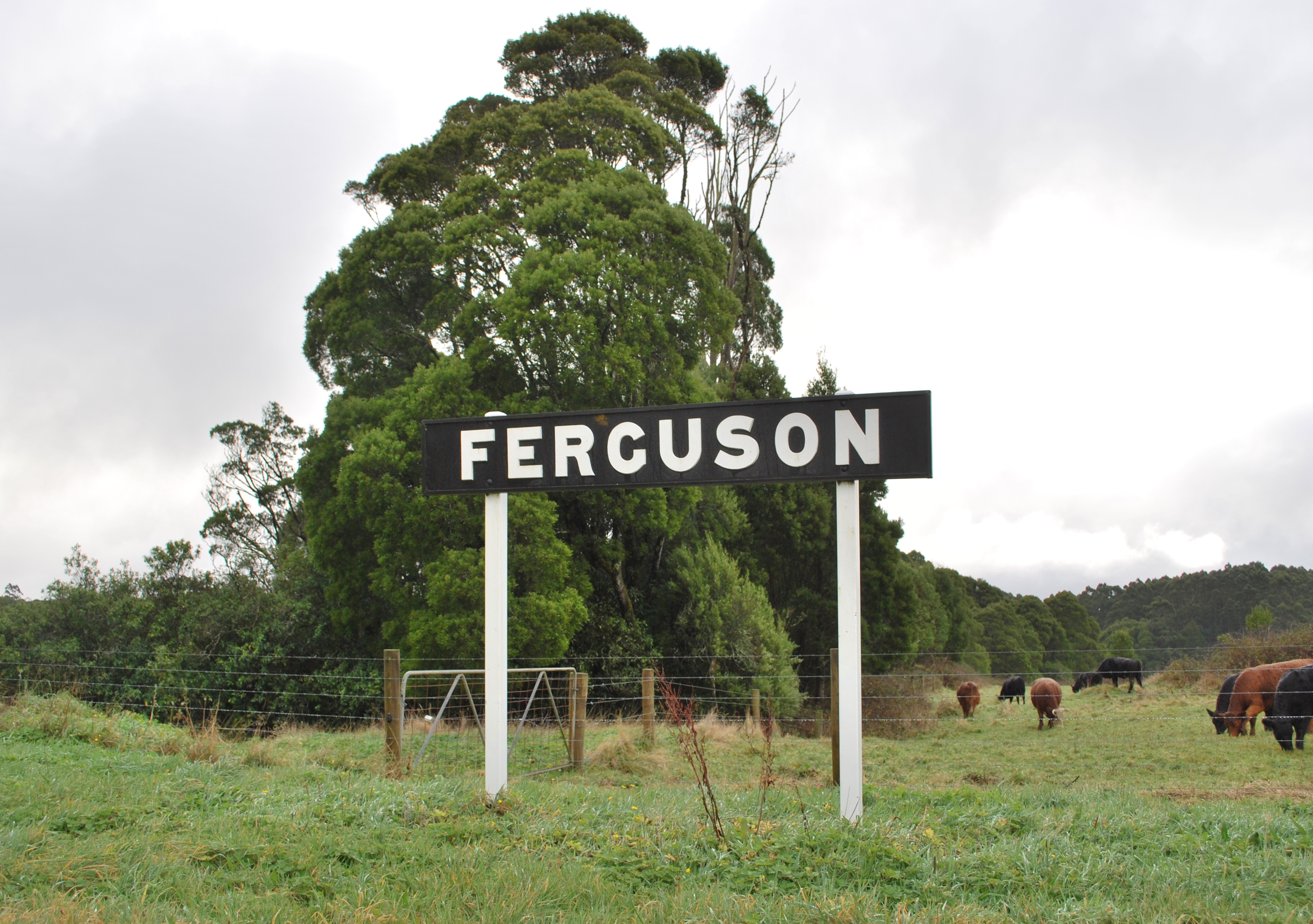
- The former station sign from the closed railway station at Ferguson

- Coordinates: 38°37′51″S 143°31′42″E
- Country: Australia
- State: Victoria
- LGA: Colac Otway Shire
- Location: 195 km (121 mi) SW of Melbourne; 41 km (25 mi) S of Colac; 4 km (2.5 mi) W of Beech Forest

Government
  - State electorate: Polwarth
  - Federal division: Wannon

Population
  - Total: 13 (SAL 2021)
- Postcode: 3237

Ferguson is a locality in south west Victoria, Australia. The locality is in the Colac Otway Shire, 195 kilometres (121 mi) south west of the state capital, Melbourne.

At the 2016 census, Ferguson had a population of 19.

A postal receiving office opened at Ferguson on 21 November 1919, was upgraded to a post office on 1 August 1920 and closed on 11 August 1951.

Ferguson State School opened on 31 January 1940 in a building which had been moved from the closed school at nearby Moorbanool. It closed on 16 December 1948, with the pupils subsequently attending the school at Lavers Hill.
