= Beech Forest railway station =

Former railway station in Victoria, Australia

Coordinates: 38°38′10″S 143°34′8″E

Beech Forest
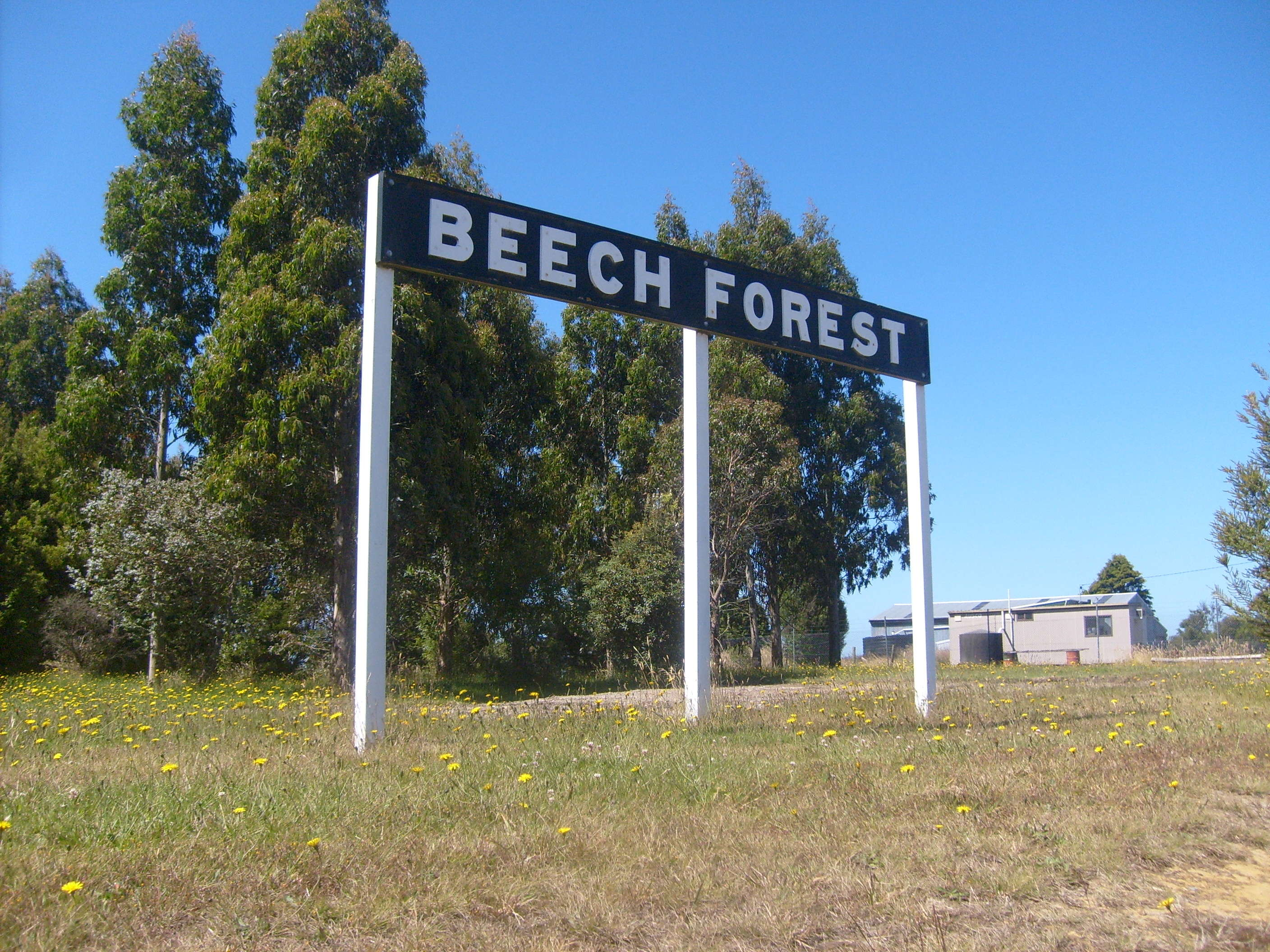

General information
- Line: Crowes
- Platforms: 1
- Tracks: 4

Other information
- Status: Closed

History
- Opened: 1902
- Closed: 1962

Services
Preceding station	Disused railways	Following station
Ditchley	Crowes line	Buchanan
	List of closed railway stations in Victoria	
Location

Beech Forest railway station is a closed and demolished railway station in the town of Beech Forest on the former Crowes railway line. There is currently a park and toilets at the up end of the former station yard.

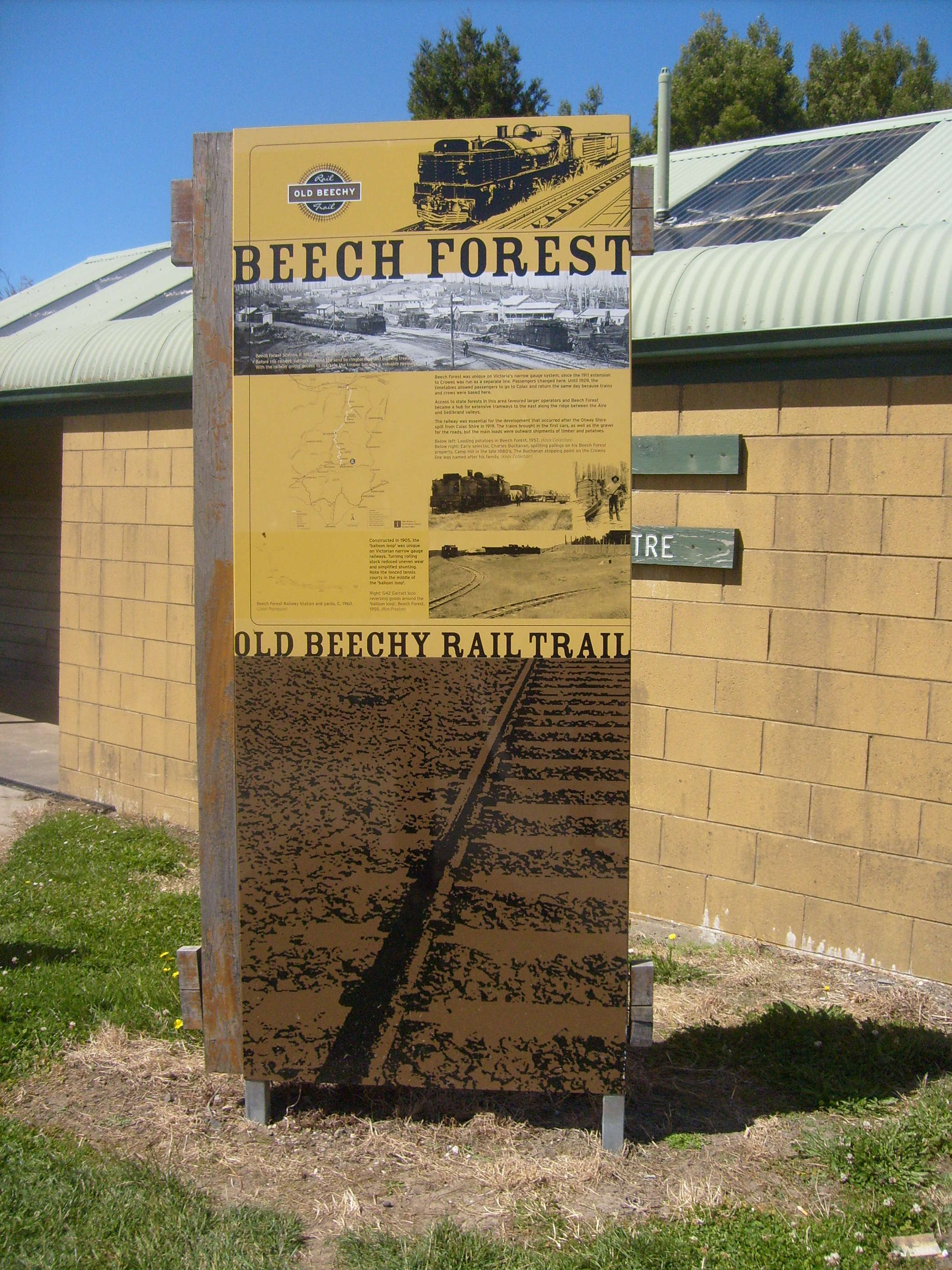
A memorial sign at Beech Forest

Both the Colac and Crowes lines entered Beech Forest yard from the same end, creating a junction. Trains had to be turned to run down the Crowes branch and a balloon loop was provided at the other end of the yard. A tennis court occupied the land within the loop.

Remains of the station can be seen in the cutting for the former loop at the down end of the yard which surrounds the disused tennis court, and in the two Departmental Residences which are still standing and occupied.

The station can be reached via the Old Beechy Rail Trail, which follows much of the route of the former Colac–Crowes railway.
