= Larpent, Victoria =

Larpent Victoria
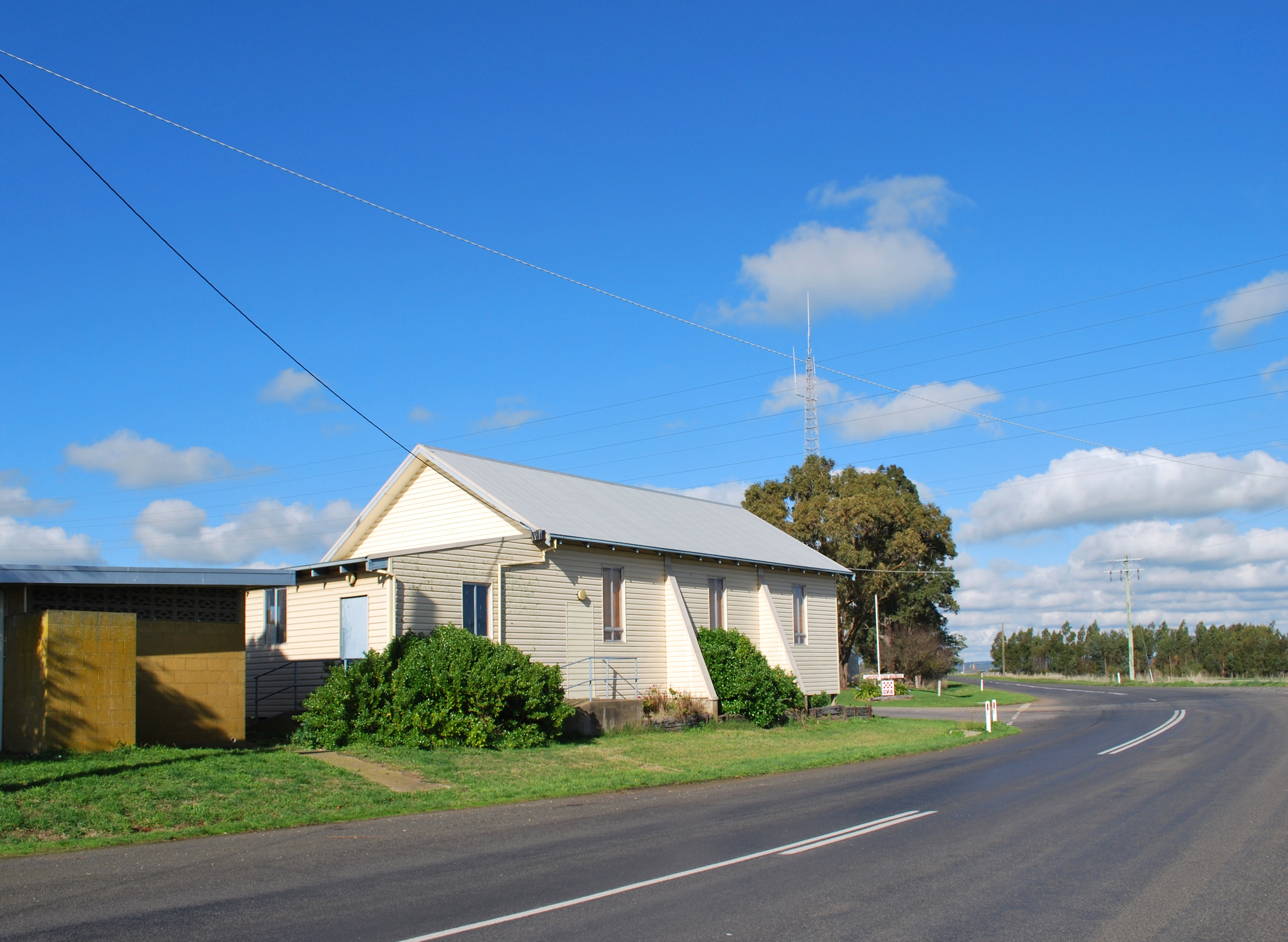
- Public hall at Larpent, 2012

- Coordinates: 38°20′33″S 143°29′39″E
- Population: 194 (2016 census)
- Postcode(s): 3249
- Location: 159 km (99 mi) SW of Melbourne; 9 km (6 mi) W of Colac
- LGA(s): Colac Otway Shire
- State electorate(s): Polwarth
- Federal division(s): Wannon

Larpent is a locality in south west Victoria, Australia. The locality is in the Colac Otway Shire, 159 kilometres (99 mi) south west of the state capital, Melbourne.

At the 2016 census, Larpent had a population of 194.
