= OCR FM =

Coordinates: 38.3400°S 143.5882°E

3OCR - OCR FM
Colac, Victoria; Australia
- Broadcast area: Colac and Otways, Apollo Bay and Coast
- Frequency: 98.3 MHz / 88.7 MHz

Programming
- Format: Community

History
- Former call signs: Otway FM, CPR FM
- Former frequencies: 99.1MHz / 104.7MHz
- Call sign meaning: Otways Community Radio

Links
- Website: www.ocrfm.org.au

OCR FM is a non-profit community radio station based in Colac, Victoria, Australia. OCR is a volunteer organisation with no employed staff, broadcasting 24 hours a day and seven days a week, with locally produced programming supplemented by locally produced announcements and music.

== History and previous identities ==
3OCR was previously known as Otway FM, however with the change-over to a full licence from a previously allocated Temporary Community Broadcasting Licence (TCBL) the organisation's name was changed to reflect its call sign. The name itself OCR represents "Otways Community Radio"

Colac Community Radio Group Inc. (later changed to 'Colac Public Radio Group Inc.') was established in 1991 by Group president Anthony Prytz, after an advertisement in 'The Colac Herald' was placed calling for a public expressions of interest meeting by Prytz to start a new radio station in Colac.

Approximately 25 people attended that meeting, held at the old Adult Education Center in Murray Street (Now home to an Asian restaurant).

The stations first (temporary) studios were set up above an architect office in Murray Street (for approximately 2 months at no charge to the group) so members could become familiar with borrowed equipment in readiness for the group's first test broadcast that year. Then the station moved to 168b Murray Street Colac, above a local sports store, for a "peppercorn" rent negotiated with the sports store owner at the time Don Nicholson.

== First test broadcast ==
1991 – 99.1Mhz FM – duration 1 week (6 am – 12 am, transmitter was shut down every night of the test transmission at midnight)

The first test broadcast was to gather interest from the listening public, and was quite successful, with public donations given throughout the broadcast in exchange for "Bribes To Subscribe" – (CD's, Books, Store Vouchers etc. that the station members and a few businesses had donated).

== Apollo Bay Studio ==
Once a Colac studio was established, the OCR FM committee set about involving even more volunteers in their licence area. A committee of dedicated volunteers in the Apollo Bay area set about establishing a studio in Apollo Bay. Bryan Dwyer was a driving force, having been involved in community radio elsewhere previously. He completed radio training with members of the Colac-based volunteers and began travelling to Colac weekly to present 'Sunday at the Bay' in the afternoons from the Colac studio, bringing news and music from Apollo Bay. After many months of planning meetings and working bees, a studio was created at the Youth Club in Apollo Bay. The Apollo Bay OCR FM members were trained up to use the radio equipment and on Wednesday 25 August 2010 at 7 pm, OCR FM broadcast its first live program from the new Apollo Bay studio (A Touch of Nostalgia with Allen Hokin). The studio successfully ran a number of different programs live each week until June 2013, when the Apollo Bay radio presenters decided to form their own committee and attempt to start up their own community radio station under the name Apollo Bay Radio Inc. The studio continued as a relay station until 8 October 2013. After several months of planning and testing a new transmission site was approved. OCR FM recommenced transmission in Apollo Bay on 20 February 2015.

== OCR FM today ==
OCR FM has had many community members involved with its production as volunteers over the years. The Colac studio is located at Shop 6 in the Tenpin Bowl arcade in Murray Street, with an on-air and recording studio as well as administration area. Volunteer presenters of the station hail from around the listening area including Colac, Apollo Bay, Camperdown, Alvie, Beeac and Carlisle River. The station currently broadcasts 24 hours a day, 7 days a week with locally generated programming. A computer based music rotation (affectionately known as Autopilot) of themed selections supplements the locally produced live programs. The community radio station relies on the support of members to assist with fundraising activities, such as their popular Spicks and Specks themed music trivia nights, as well as the generous support of businesses who sponsor the station.

== Frequencies ==
- 98.3 FM – Colac and district
- 88.7 FM – Along the coast
