= Cororooke =

- Town
- Coordinates: 38°17′14″S 143°31′42″E
- Country: Australia
- State: Victoria
- LGA: Colac Otway Shire

Government
  - State electorate: Polwarth
  - Federal division: Wannon

Population
  - Total: 358 (2021 census)
- Postcode: 3254

Cororooke is a town in Victoria, Australia, situated in the Shire of Colac Otway.

== Community facilities ==
The town has a post office and general store.

In July 2011, the Red Rock Regional Theatre and Gallery Inc was established to operate the former church site as a not-for-profit community-run theatre and gallery, with the church developed as a gallery and church hall as a theatre. The organisation also operates a film society with cinema screenings, a community op shop ('The Shop'), and a restaurant (the 'Stage Bistro').

The Cororooke Hall is a public hall in the main street of Cororooke, having been moved to its current site from Old Cororooke on 14 August 1913.

The town has a two-hectare public open space with a playground and barbeque area (the 'Cororooke Open Space'), which was donated to the community by Fonterra in 2013 when the Cororooke Dairy Factory closed. The Cororooke Tennis Club now operates out of the facility.

== History ==
The town's major employer, for many years, was the Cororooke Dairy Factory. It was originally established as a second factory for the Colac Dairying Company and operated for over a hundred years, eventually being owned by Bonlac and then finally Fonterra. The factory closed in 2013, with the abandoned factory site described as looking "derelict" in 2017.

Cororooke State School opened in 1887 or 1888 and closed in 1953 with the establishment of the Alvie Consolidated School at Alvie.

Cororooke Post Office opened on 14 February 1887 and became a licensed post office on 9 September 1993. A second postal receiving office briefly operated at Cororooke South from 16 May 1904 until 1 May 1905.

St David's Presbyterian Church was built in 1903, closed at an unknown date, and was sold by the church around 2011.

Corooroke had a railway station on the Alvie branch line from 1923 to 1954.

== Demographics ==
As of the 2021 Australian census, 358 people resided in Cororooke, up from 310 in the 2016 census. The median age of persons in Cororooke was 46 years. There were fewer males than females, with 49.9% of the population male and 50.1% female. The average household size was 2.6 people per household.
