= Red Rock (Victoria) =

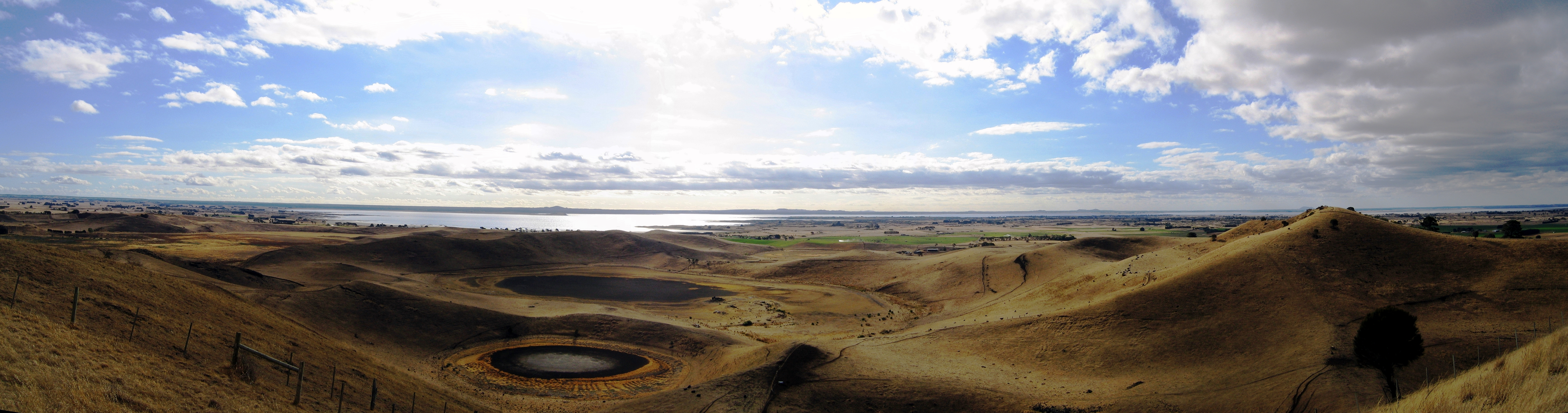
- Panorama photo from Red Rock looking towards the craters and lakes.

Highest point
- Elevation: 215 m (705 ft)
- Coordinates: 38°16′S 143°30′E

Geography
- Location within Victoria
- Location: Victoria, Australia

Geology
- Mountain type: Complex volcano
- Volcanic zone: Newer Volcanics Province
- Last eruption: 5850 BCE (?)

Red Rock is a Quaternary complex volcano in the Australian state of Victoria. It is located 11 km (6.8 mi) northwest of the small city of Colac near the southeastern shore of Lake Corangamite. The volcano is structurally complicated, consisting of a series of volcanic cones and maars. Some of the maars are intermittently filled by brackish to saline crater lakes. These include Lake Werowarp, Lake Coragulac, Lake Gnalinegurk and Lake Purdiguluc.

Red Rock, along with Tower Hill, Purrumbete and Leura, is one of the best preserved phreatomagmatic features in Eastern Australia. At least 30 eruptive vents have been identified at the volcano, with the latest known eruption having taken place possibly in 5850 BCE. This makes Red Rock one of the Newer Volcanics Province centres to have been active during the Holocene epoch.

The Red Rock Reserve was established in 1903 to preserve the volcanic landscape. This protected area was upgraded to a public recreation reserve in 1934.
