= Cressy, Victoria =

Cressy
- Town
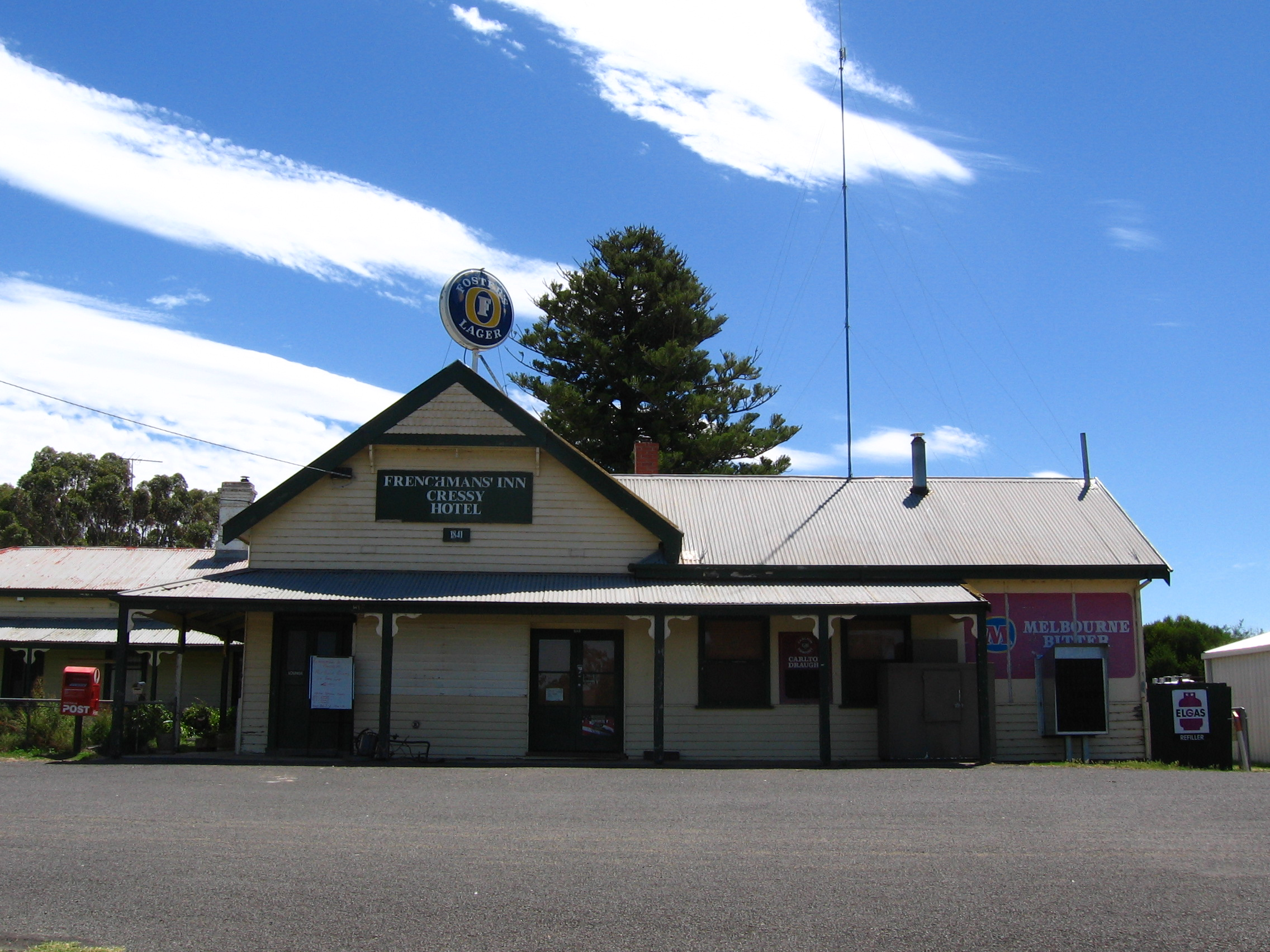
- The historic Frenchman Inn (now closed)

- Coordinates: 38°01′0″S 143°38′0″E
- Country: Australia
- State: Victoria
- LGAs: Colac Otway Shire; Shire of Corangamite; Golden Plains Shire
- Location: 140 km (87 mi) W of Melbourne; 63 km (39 mi) S of Ballarat; 39 km (24 mi) N of Colac; 20 km (12 mi) N of Beeac

Government
  - State electorate: Polwarth
  - Federal divisions: Wannon; Ballarat

Population
  - Total: 175 (2016 census)
- Postcode: 3322
Localities around Cressy
Duverney	Werneth; Rokewood	Rokewood
Duverney	Cressy	Barunah Plains; Barunah Park
Cundare North	Cundare North	Weering

Cressy is a town in Victoria, Australia, approximately 38 kilometres (24 mi) north of Colac on the Ballarat road. It is divided between Golden Plains Shire, the Shire of Colac Otway, and Corangamite Shire. At the 2016 census, Cressy and the surrounding area had a population of 175.

== History ==
George Russell, manager of the pastoral Clyde Company, opened up the area to European settlement in 1836. In 1837, a French man named Jean Duverney crossed the Woady Yaloak River, claimed land on both banks, and named the area "Frenchman's Run". Duverney called the small, developing village Cressy, after Crécy in France, where he was born.

The Cressy Post Office opened on 1 January 1858, became a licensed post office on 1 November 1993 and was downgraded to a community mail agent around 1999. Cressy Primary School opened on 1 January 1862 in the Presbyterian Church. It moved to a new building on the site of what is now the old police station in 1866, moved again to its final site in March 1912, and was extended in 1960 and 1967. The school closed on 17 December 2010.

After the outbreak of World War II, an airfield was constructed south of the town towards Colac, and was used by the RAAF until 1946 as a combat training base and for bombing practice. Cressy airfield had three airstrips, two about 300 metres (980 ft) long with a drained gravel surface and a grass airstrip about 900 metres (3,000 ft) long. Two large Bellman hangars were used for aircraft maintenance. Several RAAF aircraft crashed in the vicinity during the war.

=== Railways ===
The first railway to reach Cressy was an extension of the line from Colac to Beeac. It opened in December 1910, and by September 1911, the line had been extended north to Newtown, where it joined the line to Ballarat. In September 1910, work began at Cressy on the Western Plains Railway. This line joined the line to Ararat at Maroona, and the lines to Geelong at Gheringhap. Cressy, being at the junction of the two cross-country lines, became an important railway centre, with extensive buildings, railway yards, and a turntable. Buildings included station offices, refreshment rooms, and an elevated signal box. The line from Colac to Newtown was closed in 1953. Few traces of Cressy station now remain.

=== Cressy in the 21st century ===
A variety of old buildings remain in Cressy, although many were destroyed in the fires of 1977, which also killed three people. There are two churches remaining, and the Cressy Historical Society is now housed in the Presbyterian Church, opposite the old Post Office and general store. The church was built in 1862, and is open for research on the first Sunday of every month. The Cressy police station closed in 2010. The old post office and a telephone exchange were built in 1924 for £5,000. After it was closed, it was turned into a family home, and subsequently opened as a café and mixed business, which operated until 2014.

Cressy Football Club

The town's football team was established in 1907 and played in the Western Plains Football League in 1920 and from 1938 to 1998 and went into recess after the Western Plains FL merged with the Lexton FL in 1998.

The Cressy Football Club won senior football premierships in the Western Plains Football League in - 1920, 1949, 1951, 1953, 1959, 1961, 1969 and 1970. The club was also runners up in - 1930, 1931, 1934, 1937, 1960, 1963, 1964, 1968, 1975, 1976, 1978 and 1998.
