= Alvie, Victoria =

Alvie
- Town
- Coordinates: 38°14′40″S 143°30′56″E
- Country: Australia
- State: Victoria
- LGA: Colac Otway Shire
- Location: 166 km (103 mi) SW of Melbourne; 91 km (57 mi) W of Geelong; 16 km (9.9 mi) NW of Colac

Government
  - State electorate: Polwarth
  - Federal division: Wannon

Population
  - Total: 141 (2021 census)
- Postcode: 3249
Localities around Alvie
Dreeite South	Dreeite South	Warrion
Wool Wool	Alvie	Warrion
Pomborneit East	Corunnun	Coragulac

Alvie is a locality in Victoria, Australia. It is located along Baynes Road, in the Colac Otway Shire, north-west of Colac. It was named after a Scottish town of the same name, which was the birthplace of James Macpherson Grant, the Minister of Lands. It is situated in what became a rich dairying, potato and onion growing area.

Red Rock Reserve, which incorporates several volcanic craters, is in Alvie. It includes a public lookout.

Alvie Primary School first opened around 1890 as Alvie State School. On 9 September 1952, it became the Alvie Consolidated School, with a number of nearby schools closed (Nalangil, Wool Wool, Dreeite, Dreeite South, Dreeite North, Warrion, Balintore and Ondit) and their students transported to Alvie. A number of buildings from former schools were also transported to Alvie to accommodate the larger student population. The consolidated school operated both primary and post-primary classes (to Intermediate Certificate level) until 1965, then taught primary students only due to decreasing student numbers. In 2020, the school was renamed Alvie Primary School.

A post office at Alvie opened on 27 June 1894 and closed on 31 October 1978.

A railway branch line to Alvie from Colac was opened in 1923, mainly to assist the development of soldier settlement in the area after World War I. The line closed in 1954.

Alvie Football Netball Club has an Australian rules football and a netball team competing in the Colac & District Football League. The football team, the Swans, has won 12 premierships since World War II.
