= Irrewarra =

Irrewarra Victoria
- Coordinates: 38°18′0″S 143°38′7″E
- Population: 365 (2021 census)
- Postcode(s): 3249
- LGA(s): Colac Otway Shire
- State electorate(s): Polwarth
- Federal division(s): Wannon

Irrewarra is a locality in Victoria, Australia, situated in the Shire of Colac Otway.

== Demographics ==
As of the 2021 Australian census, 365 people resided in Irrewarra, up from 345 in the 2016 census. The median age of persons in Irrewarra was 47 years. There were more males than females, with 53.6% of the population male and 46.4% female. The average household size was 2.5 people per household.

The Aboriginal Australian religious figure Nora Hood was born here c. 1836.
