= Barongarook West =

Town in Australia

- Town
- Coordinates: 38°25′53″S 143°32′12″E
- Country: Australia
- State: Victoria
- LGA: Colac Otway Shire

Government
  - State electorate: Polwarth
  - Federal division: Wannon

Population
  - Total: 291 (2021 census)
- Postcode: 3249

Barongarook West is a locality in Victoria, Australia, situated in the Shire of Colac Otway.

As of the 2021 Australian census, 291 people resided in Barongarook West, up from 235 in the 2016 census. The median age of persons in Barongarook West was 43 years. There were more males than females, with 54.3% of the population male and 45.7% female. The average household size was 2.9 people per household.

Barongarook West State School (originally Barongarook State School) opened on 6 December 1876, was renamed Barongarook West in 1915, and closed on 18 August 1947. Barongarook West Post Office opened on 13 August 1947 and closed on 30 September 1971.
