= Elliminyt =

- Town
- Coordinates: 38°22′04″S 143°34′57″E
- Country: Australia
- State: Victoria
- LGA: Colac Otway Shire

Government
  - State electorate: Polwarth
  - Federal division: Wannon

Population
  - Total: 3,260 (2021 census)
- Postcode: 3250

Elliminyt (/ɛˈlɪmənaɪt/ eh-LIM-ə-night) is a town in Victoria, Australia, situated in the Shire of Colac Otway.

== Demographics ==
As of the 2021 Australian census, 3,260 people resided in Elliminyt, up from 2,900 in the 2016 census. The median age of persons in Elliminyt was 41 years. There were more males than females, with 50.4% of the population male and 49.6% female. The average household size was 2.7 people per household.
