= Beeac =

- Town
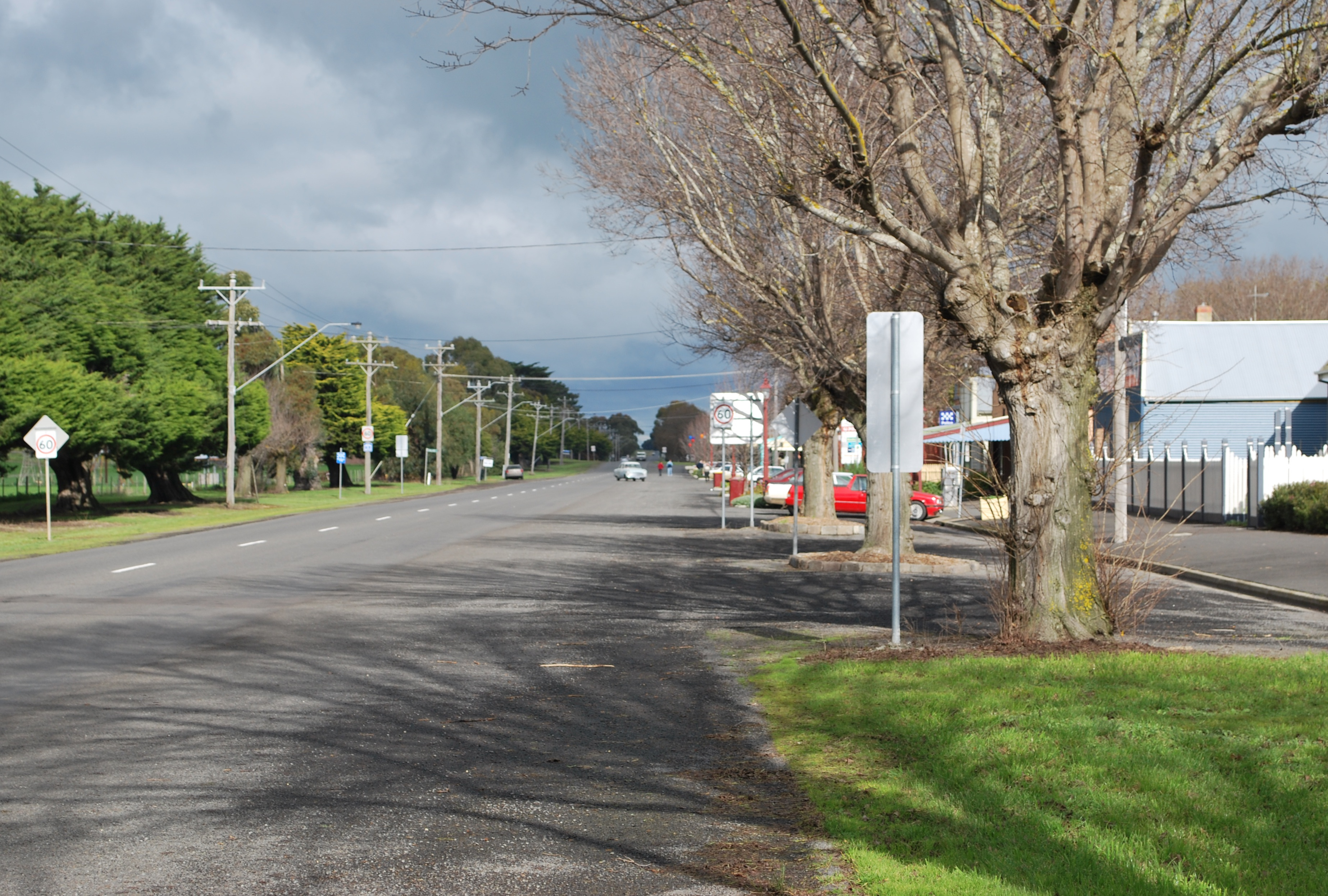
- Main Street, Beeac seen from the north

- Coordinates: 38°12′0″S 143°38′0″E
- Country: Australia
- State: Victoria
- LGA: Colac Otway Shire
- Location: 160 km (99 mi) SW of Melbourne; 84 km (52 mi) W of Geelong; 82 km (51 mi) S of Ballarat; 19 km (12 mi) N of Colac

Government
  - State electorate: Polwarth
  - Federal division: Wannon

Population
  - Total: 394 (2021 census)
- Postcode: 3251
Localities around Beeac
Cundare	Weering	Eurack
Dreeite	Beeac	Ombersley
Warrion	Ondit	Irrewarra

Beeac is a town in the Western District of Victoria, Australia. The town is located on the shore of the hyper-saline Lake Beeac in the Colac Otway Shire local government area, 160 kilometres southwest of the state capital, Melbourne. At the 2016 census, Beeac had a population of 370.

== History ==
Beeac was originally created as a reserve for campers, and the name is thought to mean either "salt lake" or "grubs" in the local Aboriginal language. From 1860, the area was opened for selection and a townsite was surveyed in 1864. A post office opened on 1 January 1862 but was known as Ondit (the name of the surrounding parish) until 1872.

The original post office building was destroyed by fire in 1926, but was eventually replaced by the current building. By the end of the decade, the Beeac area had become a prominent wheat growing district, wine grapes were cultivated and a salt works was operating on the lake. Throughout the 1860s and 1870s, churches, schools, shops and hotels were established. The railway reached Beeac in 1889, bringing the area into closer contact with nearby Colac. The line closed in 1953. A newspaper, The Beeac Advocate and Weering and Warrion Advertiser, operated from 1901 to 1902 and the local hospital was founded in 1928.

== The town today ==
The town in conjunction with neighbouring township Irrewarra has an Australian Rules football team competing in the Colac & District Football League.

Golfers play at the course of the Beeac Golf Club on Mingawalla Road.

== Notable people ==
The test cricketer, Bill Johnston was born and raised in Beeac. Geelong Football Club premiership player and 1965 Best and Fairest winner, Peter Walker, was also originally from Beeac. Geelong Football Club Grandfinalist VFL player 1989 [[David Cameron (footballer)|David Leigh Cameron]], born Beeac 1964.
