= Warrion =

- Town
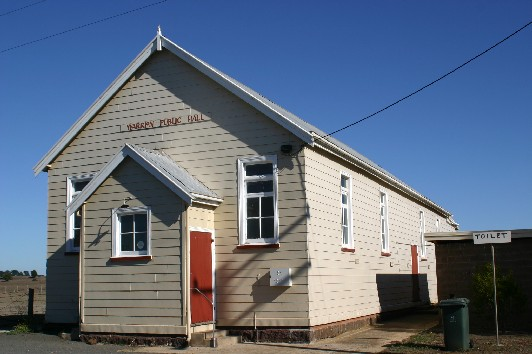
- Warrion Community Hall

- Coordinates: 38°13′0″S 143°34′0″E
- Country: Australia
- State: Victoria
- LGA: Colac Otway Shire
- Location: 161 km (100 mi) SW of Melbourne; 86 km (53 mi) W of Geelong; 19 km (12 mi) N of Colac

Government
  - State electorate: Polwarth
  - Federal division: Wannon

Population
  - Total: 198 (2016 census)
- Postcode: 3249
Localities around Warrion
Dreeite South	Dreeite	Beeac
Alvie	Warrion	Ondit
Alvie	Coragulac	Balintore

Warrion is a village in south west Victoria, Australia. Its buildings include a motor vehicle and farm equipment workshop, the Ti Tree Hotel, a church, a fire brigade station staffed by volunteers and a community hall. Warrion sits at the foot of Warrion Hill. At the 2016 census, Warrion had a population of 198.

There are a number of early and important references (see below) to first contact with local aboriginal inhabitants.

Warrion Post Office opened on 24 August 1875 and closed in 1976.

The general store was owned throughout the 1950s by George Glover and his wife, Rosie. The Glovers drove a Ford 100e panel van and sold home-made lunchtime pies to schools across the district. Mr Glover sold the pies from a pie warmer from the rear tailgate. His wife, Rosie, sat on the tailgate dispensing tomato sauce for a penny a serve. The Glovers sold meat, fish, vegetable, apple and apricot pies.

Main rural industries included cropping of peas and onions, and dairy farming. Warrion has important groundwater resources which are used widely in local farming activities. Farming families included Leahy, Carroll, Kerr, Hay, Cowley, De Lorenzo, Monaco and Illett.

In recent years, farms have been absorbed into larger landholdings, with an associated decline in rural population. Underground water storage is depleted due to incessant irrigation from large capacity bores on huge dairy farms.

The historic stone walls have recently been roughly plundered without consideration for heritage or visual appeal. The walls have been bulldozed and transported for sale into metropolitan landscaping businesses by some local large dairy farming enterprises.

== Warrion Oval ==
The Warrion recreation reserve is managed by the Warrion Recreation Reserve Committee. The Victorian Cricket Association have scheduled the occasional Premier grade cricket match at the Warrion Oval since 2006, attracting several well-known Australian cricketers as well as large crowds. The oval was home to the Warrion Football Club, which used to compete in the Colac & District Football League until the team disbanded at the end of 1985. The team won the 1938 and 1952 premierships. Curator Eric Hay is renowned across the state for the high quality outfields and turf wickets he produces. A turf wicket was first put in place in 1980 and is regarded as one of the best regional cricketing facilities in Victoria.

== Warrion Cricket Club ==
The Warrion Cricket Club is one steeped in history since its formation in the late 1880s. The club now competes in the Colac District Cricket Association. Its first premiership came in the late 1970s before the club entered its golden era of the 1980s and 1990s when it regularly competed in finals. The club's most recent premiership came in the 2009-10 season when it defeated the Alvie Cricket Club at the Warrion recreation reserve. Jarrod Stinchombe was named man of the match taking four wickets in a commanding win under the guidance of Ray Barrow. The club has produced several district cricketers including Gavin Holland (Richmond) and Phillip Lang (North-Melbourne - Geelong). The club currently fields three Senior teams and Junior teams.

== Gallery ==
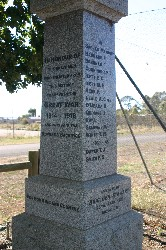
Warrion War Memorial

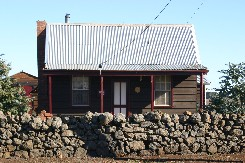
A Warrion cottage - Originally home for a family of five.

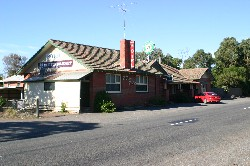
The renowned Ti Tree Hotel.
