= Aire Valley =

- Suburb
- Coordinates: 38.6911°S 143.5661°E
- Country: Australia
- State: Victoria

Government
  - State electorate: Polwarth
  - Federal division: Wannon

Population
  - Total: 0 (2021 census)
- Postcode: 3237

Aire Valley is a locality in Victoria, Australia, situated in the Shire of Colac Otway. In the 2021 census, there were no residents recorded in Aire Valley.

A plantation of redwoods lies within the Great Otway National Park in Aire Valley.
