= Barongarook =

Town in Australia

- Town
- Coordinates: 38°25′39.7″S 143°36′51.1″E
- Country: Australia
- State: Victoria
- LGA: Colac Otway Shire

Government
  - State electorate: Polwarth
  - Federal division: Wannon

Population
  - Total: 458 (2021 census)
- Postcode: 3249

Barongarook is a locality in Victoria, Australia, situated in the Shire of Colac Otway. In the 2016 census, Barongarook had a population of 434.

Barongarook Primary School opened on 12 December 1879 as Barongarook Forest State School, was later renamed Barongarook East and then shortened to Barongarook. It became an annex of Lavers Hill P-12 College in 1993 and closed entirely in 2009 due to falling enrolments. The site was then used for adult education purposes until this too closed in 2016.

Barongarook Post Office opened on 15 July 1887, was renamed Barongarook on 1 October 1909 and closed on 31 October 1974.
