= Balintore, Victoria =

Coordinates: 38.280°S 143.582°E

Balintore
- Town
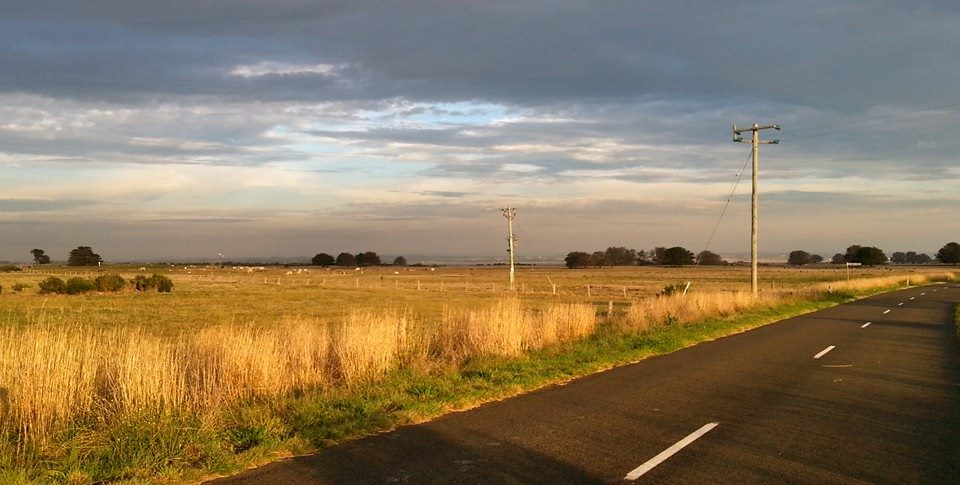
- Langs James Rd, Balintore
- Country: Australia
- State: Victoria
- LGA: Shire of Colac Otway

Population
  - Total: 67
- Postcode: 3249
Localities around Balintore
Coragulac
Cororooke	Balintore	Lake Colac
	Colac

Balintore is a locality in south west Victoria, Australia. It is approximately 15 km north of Colac.

Balintore is located between Lake Colac and Lake Corangamite.

Dairy and beef farming are the main industries in the area, with onion growing also popular in the past.

== History ==
Up to 1890 Balintore was known as the Balintore estate and was a single farming area of 4,072 acres, an area which approximately conforms to the locality's current area. In 1897 the estate had been broken up and sold off.

Balintore State School opened in 1921 in a private residence, moved to a permanent building in 1922 and closed in 1952, with children then bussed to the Alvie Consolidated School. The Balintore school building was relocated to Alvie school to serve as a library there.

A postal receiving office opened at Balintore on 10 April 1922, was upgraded to a full post office on 1 July 1927 and closed on 21 December 1959.

== Sports ==
Balintore had a cricket team in the 1930s.

A tennis club also existed for many years. The courts were removed around 1994.

== Flora ==
The Spiny Peppercress Lepidium aschersonii was identified as growing in abundance on private land within Balintore by the Victorian Government.
