= Shire of Colac Otway =

Coordinates: 38°20′00″S 143°35′00″E

- Local government area
- Location in Victoria

- Interactive map of Shire of Colac Otway
- Country: Australia
- State: Victoria
- Region: Barwon South West
- Established: 1994
- Council seat: Colac

Government
  - Mayor: Cr Kate Hanson
  - State electorate: Polwarth
  - Federal division: Wannon

Area
  - Total: 3,438 km^{2} (1,327 sq mi)

Population
  - Total: 21,503 (2018)
  - Density: 6.2545/km^{2} (16.1991/sq mi)
- Gazetted: 23 September 1994
- Website: Shire of Colac Otway
LGAs around Shire of Colac Otway
| Corangamite | Golden Plains | Golden Plains |
| Corangamite | Shire of Colac Otway | Surf Coast |
| Southern Ocean | Bass Strait | Bass Strait |

The Shire of Colac Otway is a local government area in the Barwon South West region of Victoria, Australia, located in the south-western part of the state. It covers an area of 3,438 square kilometres (1,327 mi^{2}) and in June 2018 had a population of 21,503. It includes the towns of Apollo Bay, Beeac, Birregurra, Colac, Cressy, Forrest, Kennett River, Lavers Hill, Warrion and Wye River.

The Shire is governed and administered by the Colac Otway Shire Council; its seat of local government and administrative centre is located at the council headquarters in Colac, it also has a service centre located in Apollo Bay.

== Name ==
The Shire is named after the combination of the names for the former City of Colac, and Shires of Colac and Otway, from which the majority of the LGA was formed. The name Colac is used for both the main urban settlement and the lake, Lake Colac, which are located in the north-centre of the LGA. Colac is also the most populous urban centre in the LGA with a population of almost 12,000. The name Otways is used for the major geographical features located in the south of the LGA, which are The Otways and Cape Otway. Cape Otway was originally named by Lieutenant James Grant who was the commander of the vessel, the Lady Nelson. He named it after Captain William Otway who was one of the commissioners of the Transport Board, on 7 December 1800.

== History ==
The Colac district is the traditional land for the Gulidjan people and was known as “Kolak” or “Kolakgnat” which means ‘belonging to sand’. The Gulidjan people are of the Easter Maar Nation.

The earliest European settlers arrived in the district in the 1830s and settled around Lake Colac.

The Shire of Colac Otway came into existence on 23 September 1994 through the amalgamation of the City of Colac, Shire of Colac, the bulk of the Shire of Otway and part of the Shire of Heytesbury. The Birregurra and Barwon Downs districts, historically part of the Shire of Winchelsea, were included in the new Shire as a result of their transfer to the Shire of Colac earlier in 1994. The name originally proposed for the Shire was "Shire of Gellibrand", after the Gellibrand River and the locality of the same name.

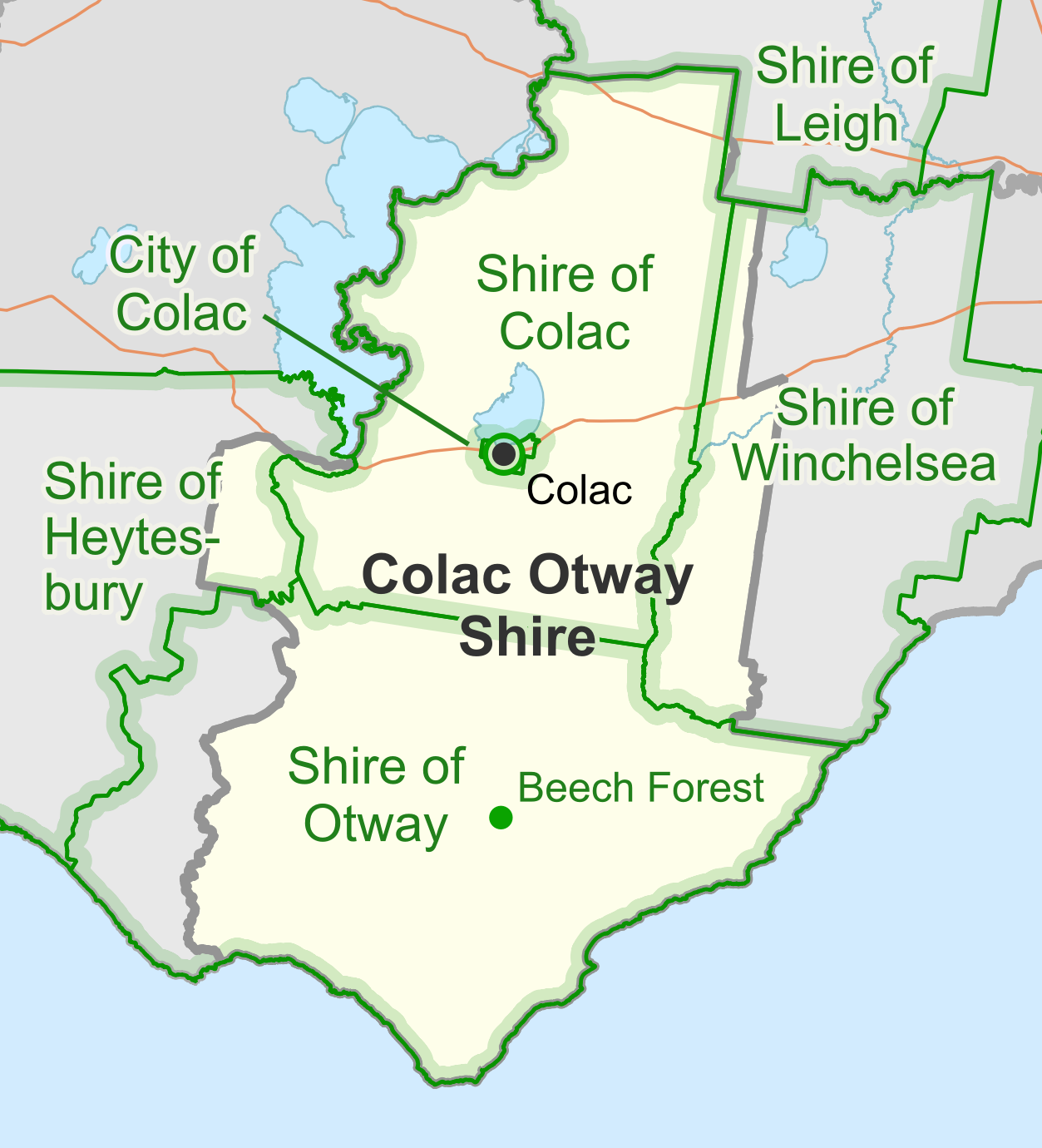
A map of Colac Otway Shire showing the predecessor LGAs that overlapped the area before the 1994 local government amalgamations

== Council ==
=== Current composition ===
The council is composed of seven councillors elected to represent an unsubdivided municipality. In order of election in 2020, they are:

| Ward | Party | Councillor | Notes |
|---|---|---|---|
| Unsubdivided | Independent | Tosh-Jake Finnigan | |
| Unsubdivided | Independent | Chris Potter | |
| Unsubdivided | Independent | Graham Lesie Costin | |
| Unsubdivided | Independent | Kate Hanson | |
| Unsubdivided | Greens | Stephen Hart | |
| Unsubdivided | Independent | Jamie Bell | |
| Unsubdivided | Independent | Margaret White | |

==== Former Wards (1996–2008) ====
- Colac – had three councillors
- Murray – had one councillor
- Otway – had one councillor
- Warrion – had one councillor

=== Administration and governance ===
The council meets in the council chambers at the council headquarters in the Colac Municipal Offices, which is also the location of the council's administrative activities. It also provides customer services at both its administrative centre in Colac, and its service centre in Apollo Bay.

== Election results ==
=== 2024 ===
2024 Victorian local elections: Colac Otway
| Party | Candidate | Votes | % | ±% |
|---|---|---|---|---|
| Independent | Jason Schram (elected 1) | 2,188 | 15.81 | +15.81 |
| Independent | Chris Potter (elected 2) | 1,613 | 11.65 | –0.29 |
| Independent | Zoe Hudgell (elected 3) | 1,280 | 9.25 | +9.25 |
| Independent | Mick McCrickard (elected 6) | 1,051 | 7.59 | +7.59 |
| Independent | Phil Howard (elected 4) | 1,033 | 7.46 | +7.46 |
| Independent | Charlie Buchanan (elected 5) | 1,000 | 7.22 | +7.22 |
| Independent | Tosh-Jake Finnigan | 814 | 5.88 | –0.77 |
| Independent | Mick Fischer | 798 | 5.77 | +5.77 |
| Greens | Chrissy De Deugd (elected 7) | 780 | 5.64 | –4.02 |
| Independent | Nick Lang | 667 | 4.82 | +4.82 |
| Independent | Cheryl Miller | 539 | 3.89 | +3.89 |
| Independent | Rhea Sabine Wigley | 438 | 3.16 | +3.16 |
| Independent | Max Arnott | 391 | 2.82 | +0.20 |
| Independent | Gavin Davies | 385 | 2.78 | +2.78 |
| Independent | Kerrie Thackeray | 385 | 2.78 | +2.78 |
| Independent | Peter Byrnes | 161 | 1.16 | +1.16 |
| Independent | Tina Hill | 160 | 1.16 | +1.16 |
| Independent | John Knight | 159 | 1.15 | +1.15 |
| Total formal votes | | 13,842 | 93.05 | –1.91 |
| Informal votes | | 1,034 | 6.95 | +1.91 |
| Turnout | | 14,876 | 84.83 | +0.22 |

=== 2020 ===
2020 Victorian local elections: Colac Otway
| Party | Candidate | Votes | % | ±% |
|---|---|---|---|---|
| Independent Liberal | Joe McCracken (elected 1) | 3,637 | 22.98 | |
| Independent | Chris Potter (elected 2) | 1,889 | 11.94 | |
| Independent | Graham Costin (elected 3) | 1,727 | 10.91 | |
| Greens | Stephen Hart (elected 5) | 1,528 | 9.66 | |
| Independent | Kate Hanson (elected 4) | 1,425 | 9.00 | |
| Independent | Jamie Bell (elected 6) | 1,251 | 7.91 | |
| Independent | Tosh-Jake Finnigan | 1,052 | 6.65 | |
| Put Climate First | Susan Langridge | 832 | 5.26 | +5.26 |
| Independent | Margaret White (elected 7) | 678 | 4.28 | |
| Independent | Catriona Ebeling | 597 | 3.77 | |
| Independent | Max Arnott | 414 | 2.62 | |
| Independent | Maxwell Clark | 269 | 1.70 | |
| Independent | Carol Lofts | 264 | 1.67 | |
| Independent | Mark McCallum | 262 | 1.64 | |
| Total formal votes | | 15,825 | 94.96 | |
| Informal votes | | 840 | 5.04 | |
| Turnout | | 16,665 | 84.61 | |

== Townships and localities ==
The 2021 census, the shire had a population of 22,423 up from 20,972 in the 2016 census

Population
| Locality | 2016 | 2021 |
|---|---|---|
| Aire Valley | 0 | 0 |
| Alvie | 132 | 141 |
| Apollo Bay | 1,598 | 1,790 |
| Balintore | 67 | 59 |
| Barongarook | 434 | 458 |
| Barongarook West | 235 | 291 |
| Barramunga | 7 | 11 |
| Barunah Plains | 9 | 10 |
| Barwon Downs | 131 | 136 |
| Beeac | 370 | 394 |
| Beech Forest | 82 | 125 |
| Birregurra^ | 828 | 942 |
| Bungador | 62 | 65 |
| Cape Otway | 15 | 34 |
| Carlisle River^ | 135 | 168 |
| Carpendeit^ | 134 | 115 |
| Chapple Vale^ | 36 | 42 |
| Colac | 9,048 | 9,243 |
| Colac East | 217 | 168 |
| Colac West | 81 | 89 |
| Coragulac | 161 | 171 |
| Cororooke | 310 | 358 |
| Corunnun | 115 | 119 |
| Cressy^ | 175 | 176 |
| Cundare | 11 | 15 |
| Cundare North^ | 9 | 10 |
| Dreeite | 55 | 77 |
| Dreeite South | 30 | 28 |
| Elliminyt | 2,900 | 3,260 |
| Eurack | 65 | 43 |
| Ferguson | 19 | 13 |
| Forrest | 230 | 257 |
| Gellibrand | 210 | 230 |
| Gellibrand Lower^ | 13 | 19 |
| Gerangamete | 105 | 112 |
| Glenaire | 28 | 33 |
| Grey River | 4 | 4 |
| Hordern Vale | 43 | 44 |
| Irrewarra | 345 | 365 |
| Irrewillipe | 125 | 100 |
| Irrewillipe East | 76 | 84 |
| Jancourt East^ | 188 | 185 |
| Johanna | 63 | 85 |
| Kawarren | 166 | 189 |
| Kennett River | 41 | 74 |
| Larpent | 194 | 200 |
| Lavers Hill | 78 | 87 |
| Marengo | 239 | 272 |
| Mount Sabine | 0 | 0 |
| Murroon | 83 | 95 |
| Nalangil | 76 | 72 |
| Ombersley^ | 97 | 93 |
| Ondit | 94 | 101 |
| Pennyroyal^ | 86 | 110 |
| Petticoat Creek | 0 | 7 |
| Pirron Yallock^ | 113 | 132 |
| Separation Creek | 19 | 28 |
| Simpson^ | 569 | 583 |
| Skenes Creek | 164 | 249 |
| Skenes Creek North | 16 | 19 |
| Stonyford^ | 51 | 65 |
| Sugarloaf | 14 | 20 |
| Swan Marsh | 121 | 127 |
| Tanybryn | 19 | 15 |
| Warncoort | 130 | 146 |
| Warrion | 198 | 204 |
| Weeaproinah | 11 | 15 |
| Weering | 67 | 62 |
| Whoorel | 18 | 25 |
| Winchelsea^ | 1,954 | 2,456 |
| Wingeel^ | 23 | 26 |
| Wongarra | 37 | 47 |
| Wool Wool | 38 | 55 |
| Wye River | 63 | 67 |
| Wyelangta | 38 | 40 |
| Yeo | 148 | 124 |
| Yeodene | 121 | 107 |
| Yuulong | 37 | 49 |

^ - Territory divided with another LGA

== See also ==
- List of places on the Victorian Heritage Register in the Shire of Colac Otway
