= Irrewillipe =

- Town
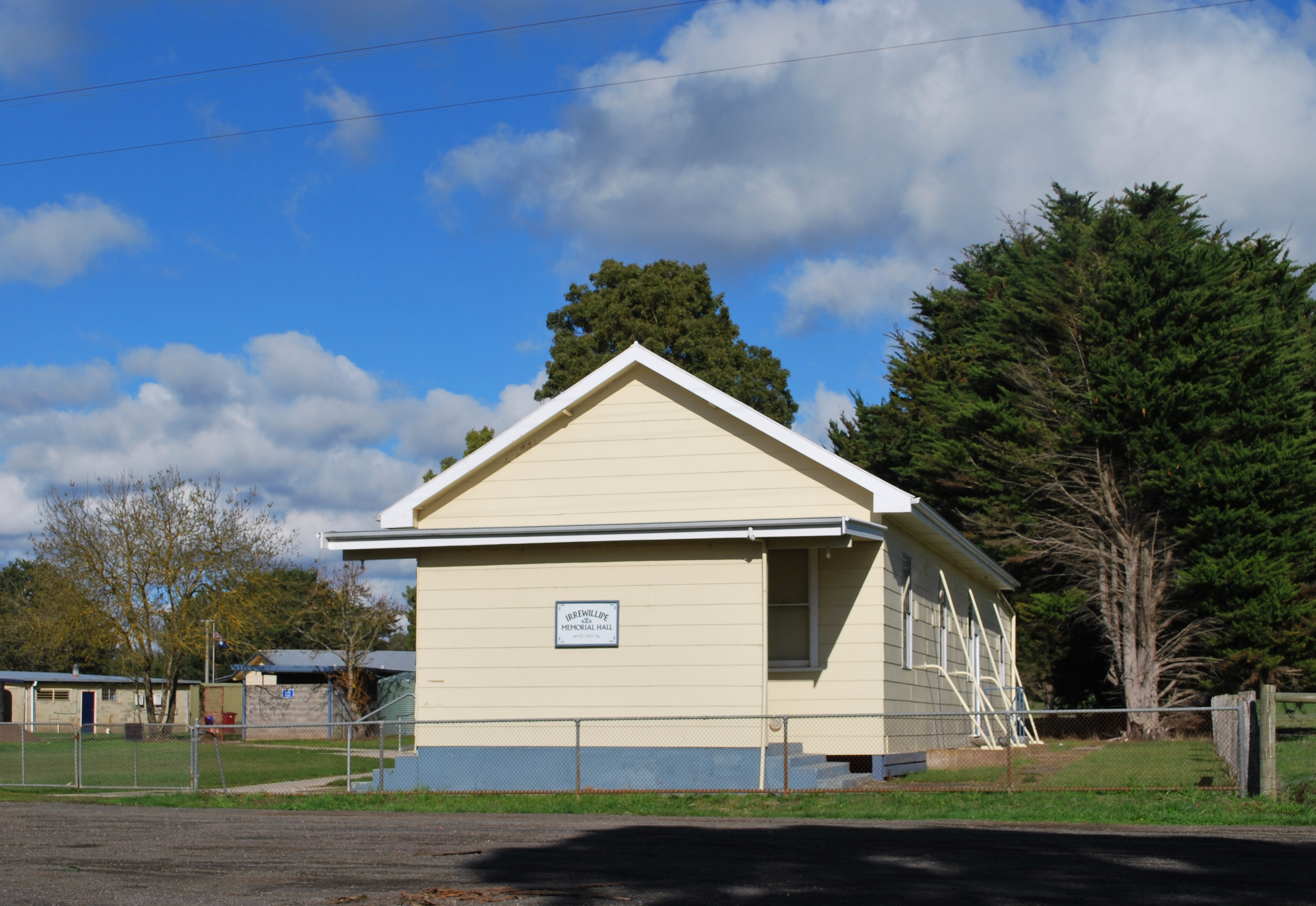
- Memorial Hall at Irrewillipe, 2012

- Coordinates: 38°24′38″S 143°26′29″E
- Country: Australia
- State: Victoria
- LGA: Colac Otway Shire
- Location: 171 km (106 mi) SW of Melbourne; 19 km (12 mi) SW of Colac

Government
  - State electorate: Polwarth
  - Federal division: Wannon

Population
  - Total: 125 (2016 census)
- Postcode: 3249

Irrewillipe (/ˌɪriˈwɪləpi/ irry-WILL-ə-pee)is a locality in south west Victoria, Australia. The locality is in the Colac Otway Shire, 171 kilometres (106 mi) south west of the state capital, Melbourne.

At the 2016 census, Irrewillipe had a population of 125.

Irrewillipe State School opened on 24 January 1870 and was still operating in 1973, closing at an unknown date thereafter.

A Bible Christian Church opened at Irrewillipe on 24 January 1886, became a Methodist church in 1902, and a Uniting Church in 1977. It closed at an unknown date and the building was subsequently sold into private ownership in 2002. It was also known as Holy Trinity Church.
