= Old Beechy Rail Trail =

Rail trail in Victoria, Australia

Coordinates: 38°24′52″S 143°35′40″E

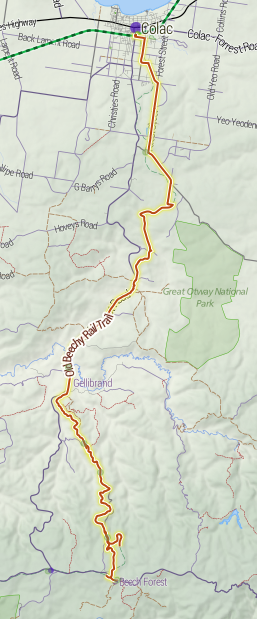
Map of the rail trail.

The Old Beechy Rail Trail is a 45–kilometre rail trail in Australia, running from Colac to Beech Forest. The trail includes approximately 30 kilometres of dedicated rail trail, with the rest being on-road. The historic "Beechy" train ran on this line from 1902 to 1962. The trail has 21 seats installed along the route for walkers to rest on, with shelters having been erected at Banool, Wimba, McDevitt and Dinmont. These were the old stopping points where the train would have collected travellers or produce. The original station signs have been replicated and painted in the Victorian railways colours. These being on a black board with white colouring and are positioned at the relevant stopping points along the rail trail. Other facets of the rail trail are the location of information boards as well as replicated road crossing markers. The first section of the Old Beechy Rail Trail was officially opened by Victoria's premier, Mr Steve Bracks in July 2005.

A new section, approximately four kilometres in length, was formally opened in March 2015. This first part of the Crowes line, commences at Beech Forest, passes the site of the Buchanan stopping point, before continuing onto Ferguson. This section passes through a patch of rain forest, before emerging into farmland that gives brilliant views to Bass Strait to the south and the Western district to the north. The Crowes station: in its heyday, was the southernmost railway station in mainland Australia. Crowes railway line.
