= Colac, Victoria =

Colac
- City
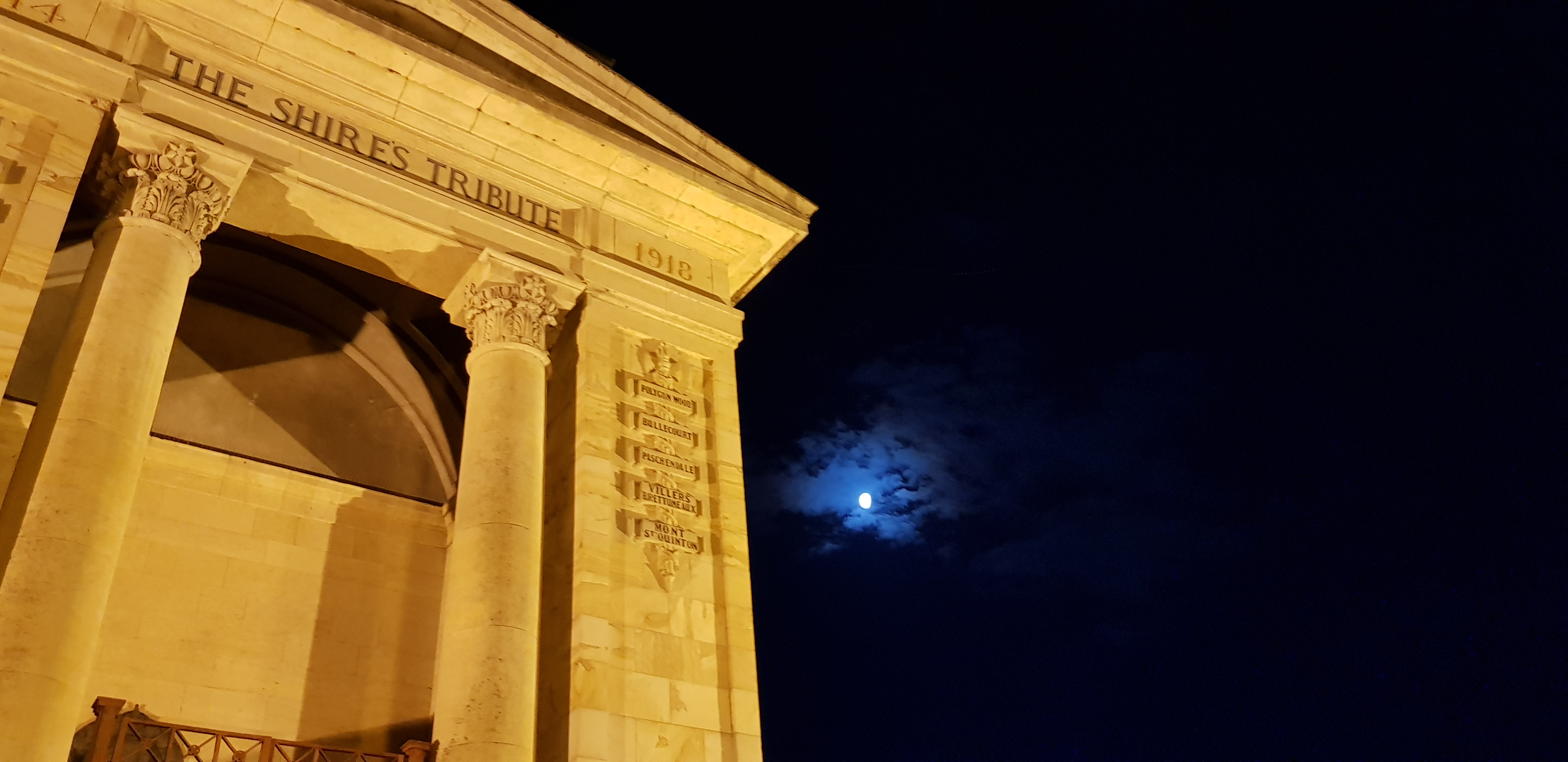
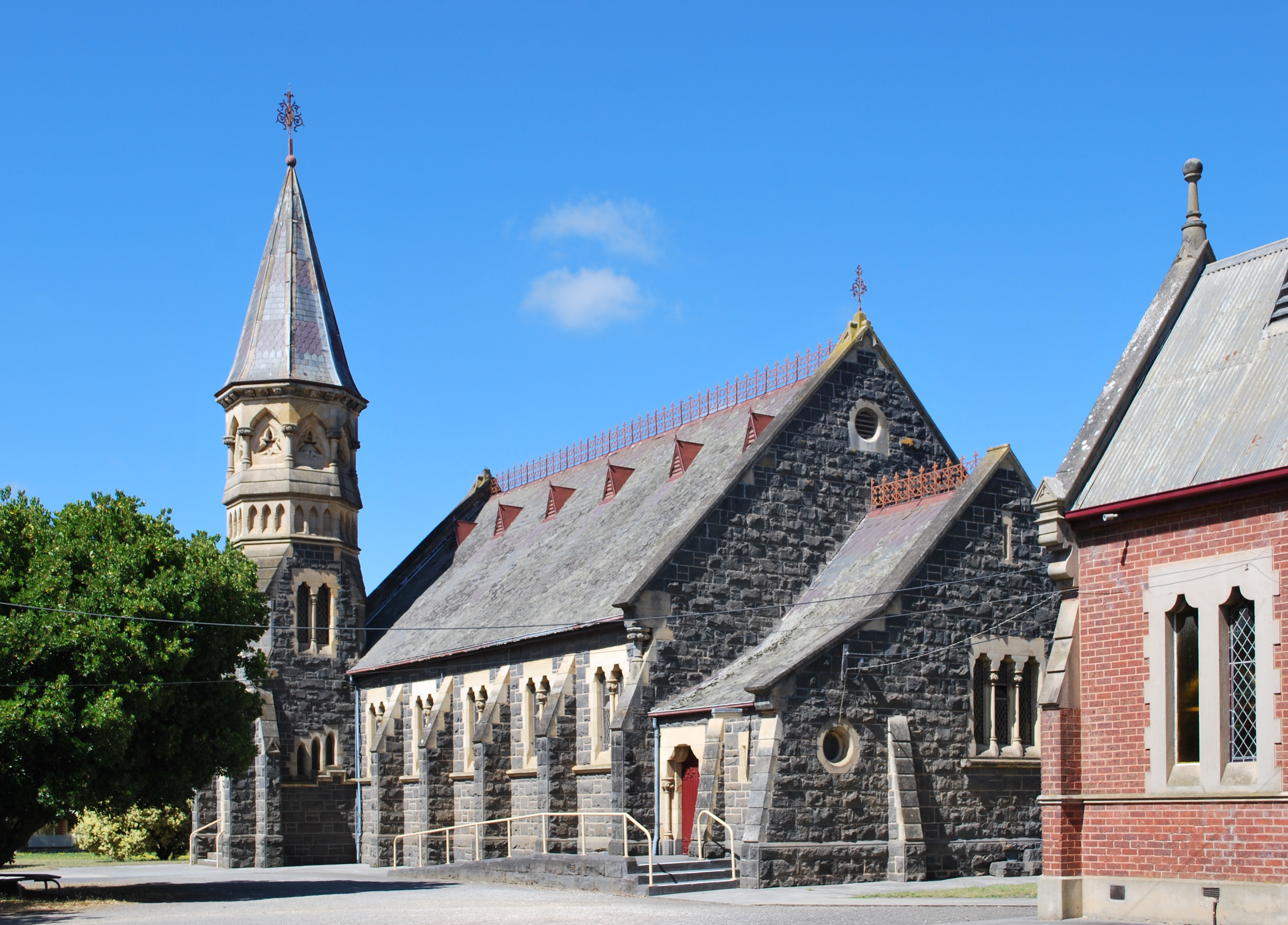
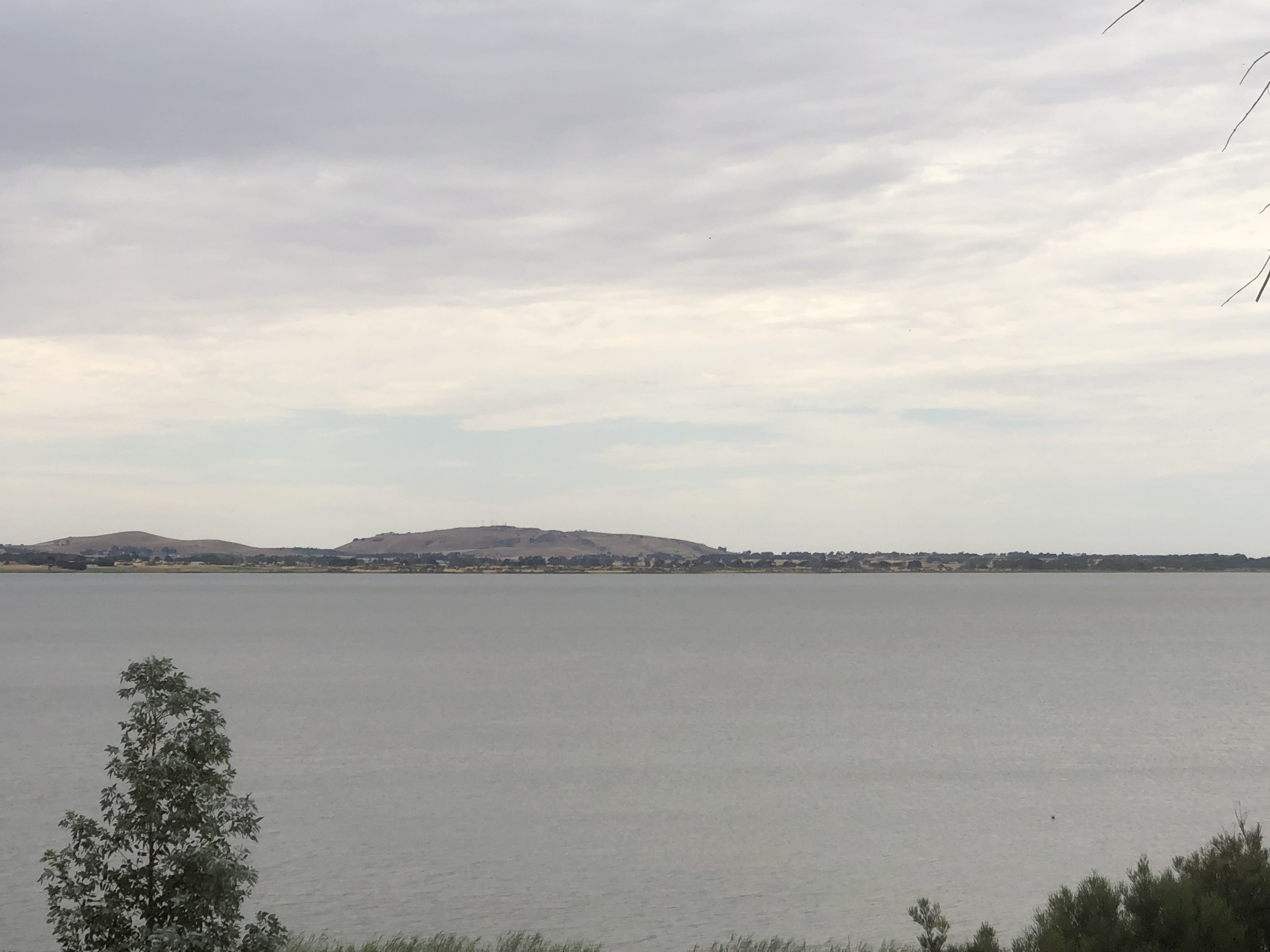
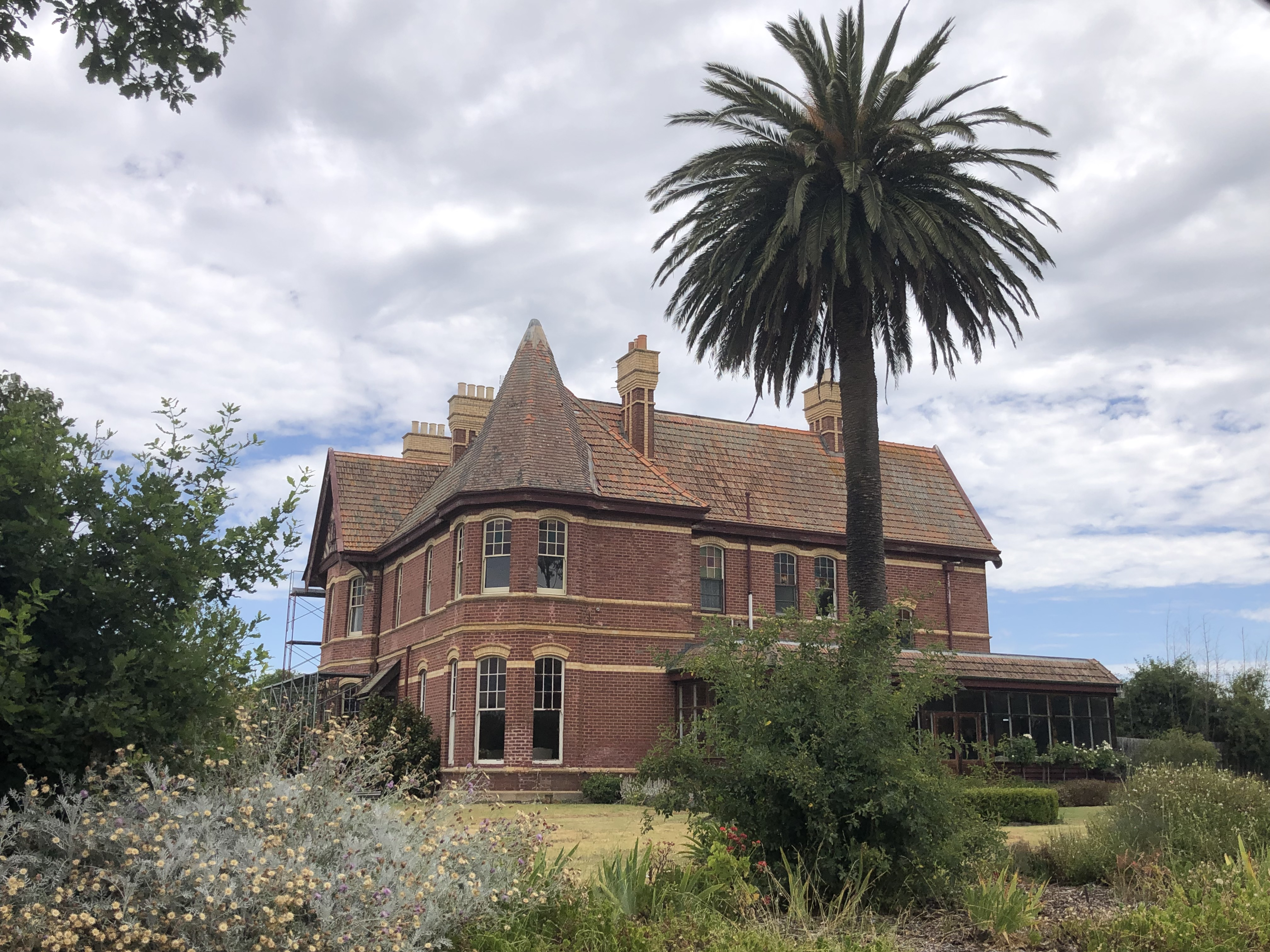
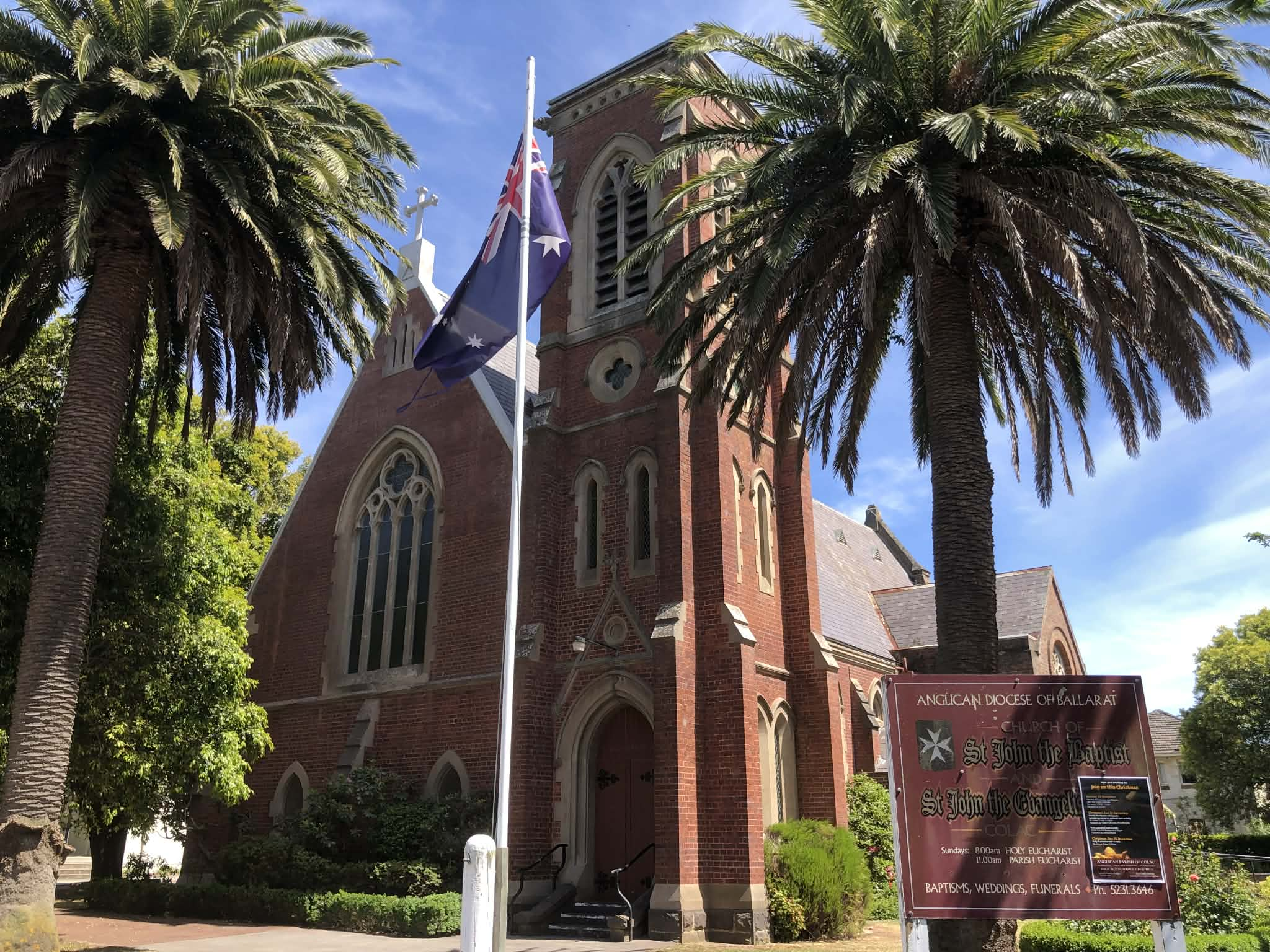
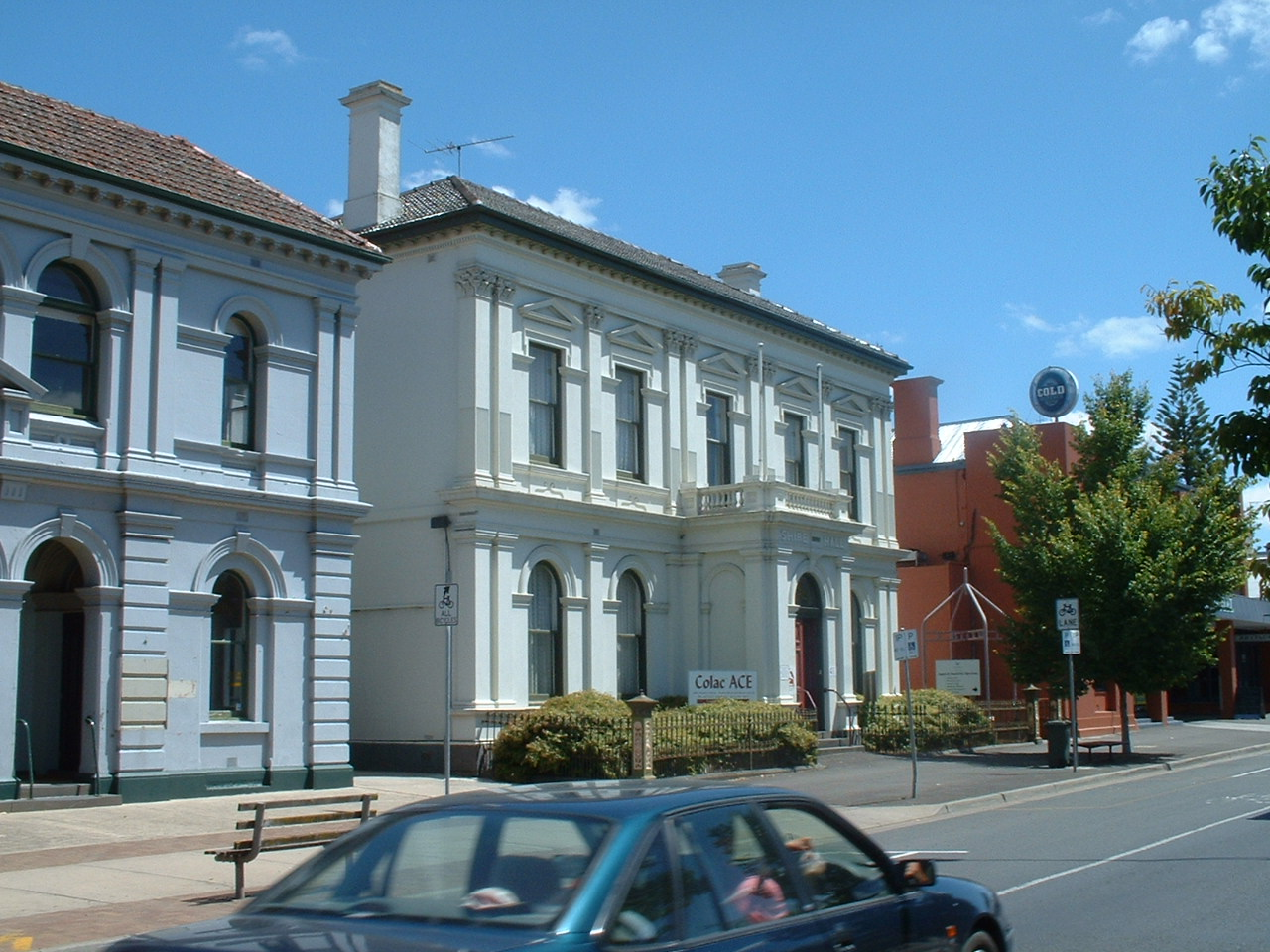
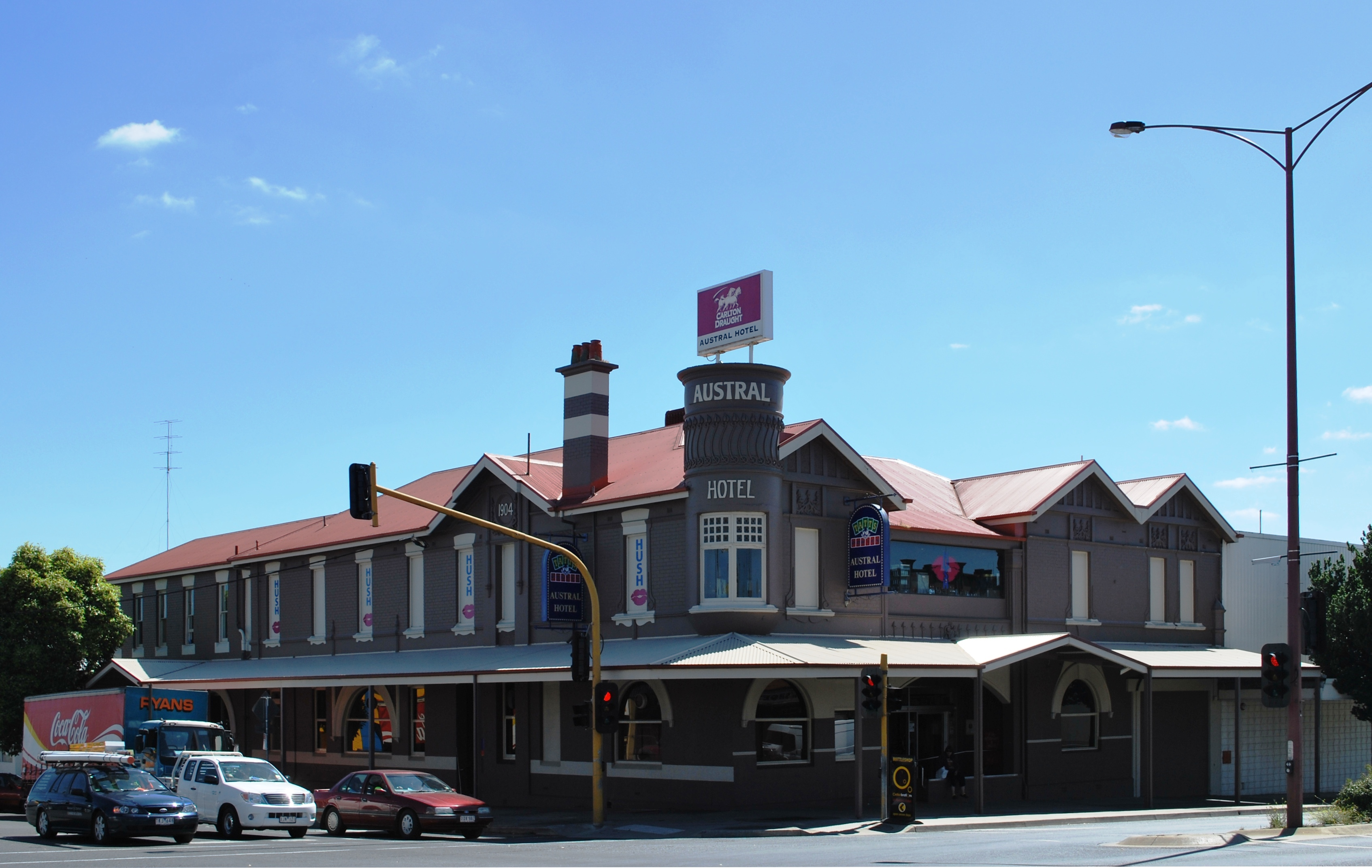
- Colac War Memorial Uniting Church Lake Colac Balnagowan Ss Johns' Anglican Church Former Shire Hall and Post Office Austral Hotel

- Coordinates: 38°20′25″S 143°35′05″E
- Country: Australia
- State: Victoria
- LGA: Colac Otway Shire
- Location: 148 km (92 mi) SW of Melbourne; 75 km (47 mi) SW of Geelong; 112 km (70 mi) E of Warrnambool

Government
  - State electorate: Polwarth
  - Federal division: Wannon
- Elevation: 134.0 m (439.6 ft)

Population
  - Total: 12,756 (2021 census)
- Time zone: UTC+10:00 (Australian Eastern Standard Time (AEST))
  - Summer (DST): +11:00
- Postcode: 3250
Localities around Colac
Balintore	Ondit	Irrewarra
Cororooke; Colac West	Colac	Irrewarra; Colac East
Elliminyt	Elliminyt	Elliminyt

Colac (/ˈkoʊlæk/ COAL-ack) is a town in the Western District of Victoria, Australia, approximately 150 kilometres south-west of Melbourne on the southern shore of Lake Colac.

== History ==
For thousands of years clans of the Gulidjan people lived in the region of Colac.

=== British settlement ===
The British first entered the region in March 1837, when several land-holders came upon Lake Colac while searching for the missing colonist Joseph Gellibrand. Another larger search party, which was acting on information that local Gulidjan had killed Gellibrand, arrived in April. This group returned to Geelong after two Gulidjan people were killed by Aboriginal trackers accompanying the party.

Settlement of the area began in September 1837 with the arrival of grazier Hugh Murray (died 1869) who selected 14,000 ha (34,000 acres) of land and established three sheep stations: Warrion, Elliminyt and Barongarook. According to Murray, conflict with the resident Gulidjan was limited, with one Aboriginal man being shot dead during punitive raids upon Aboriginal settlements following the taking of sheep. In 1841, around forty Gulidjan lived and worked on what was now Murray's property.

The surveying for a village began in 1841 and the township of Lake Colac was proclaimed in 1848.

The Post Office opened on 1 July 1848 as Lake Colac and was renamed Colac in 1854. Colac Botanic Gardens in Queen Street located on the shores of Lake Colac, were established in 1868.

=== Brookhouse Mystery ===
In 1854 town founder Hugh Murray employed a couple of shepherds named Thomas Brookhouse and Patrick Geary. Brookhouse, who was looking for missing sheep disappeared without a trace. Patrick Geary and his wife soon left the district. Fifteen years later a boy out rabbiting found the skeletal remains of Thomas Brookhouse under a pile of rocks near Lake Corangamite. Brookhouse had his head smashed in. It took Police two years to track Patrick Geary and charge him with Brookhouse's murder. A friend of Geary told the court that Geary had killed Brookhouse with an axe to stop him from informing Murray of Geary's sheep stealing activities. Geary was hanged in Melbourne in 1871.

=== Role in World War I ===
A plaque on the southern side of the Memorial Square commemorates two historic speeches given on consecutive nights in Colac, beginning on 31 July 1914 with the then Federal opposition leader, Andrew Fisher, and followed the next night by the Prime Minister Joseph Cook. The two speeches declared Australia's commitment to follow Britain into World War I, with Fisher declaring "Should honor demand the mother country taking part in hostilities, Australians would stand beside her to the last man and shilling." and Cook's famous reiteration that "If the old country is at war, so are we." Fisher became Prime Minister for the third time on 5 September.

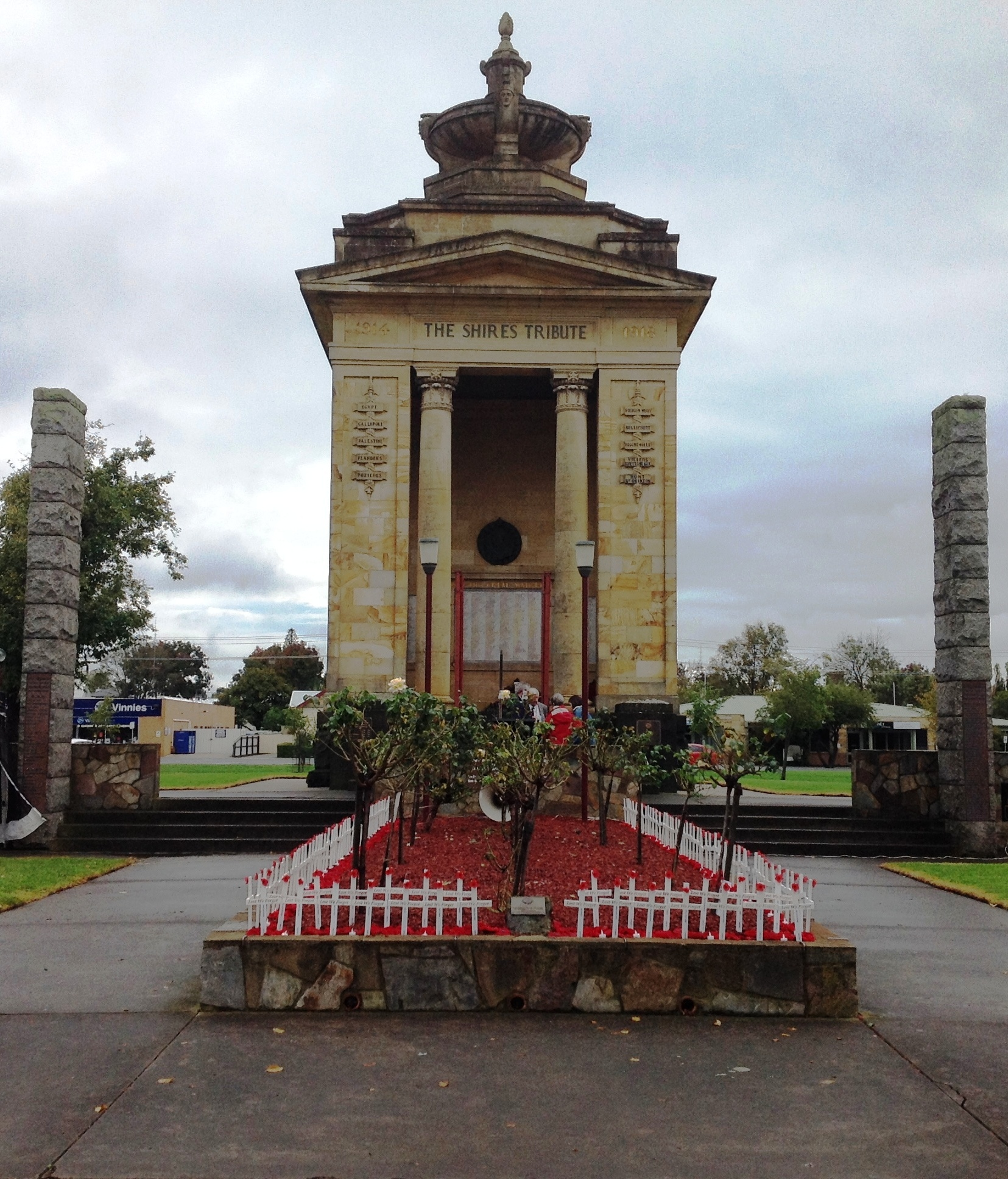
Colac War Memorial ANZAC Day 2017

The War Memorial stands in the centre of Memorial Square.

=== Heritage listed sites ===
Colac contains a number of heritage listed sites, including:

- 1 Murray Street, Adam Rea's Store
- 1–5 Fyans Street, Colac Botanic Gardens

== Schools ==
- Trinity College Colac
- Colac Secondary College
- Sacred Heart Primary School, Colac
- Colac West Primary School
- Colac Primary School
- Colac South West Primary School
- St Mary's Primary School
- Lake Colac School
- Greater Otway Applied Learning School (GOALS)
- Saints College, Colac
- Elliminyt Primary School

== Natural features ==
The plains around Colac are the third largest volcanic plain in the world. Colac is near Australia's largest permanent salt lake and Victoria's largest natural lake, Lake Corangamite, and Red Rock Reserve.

Lake Colac's water level can drop over summer dry periods to the point that it actually dried up for the first time in recorded history in 2009, but is always replenished after drought and is used for fishing, boating and water skiing.

== Transport ==
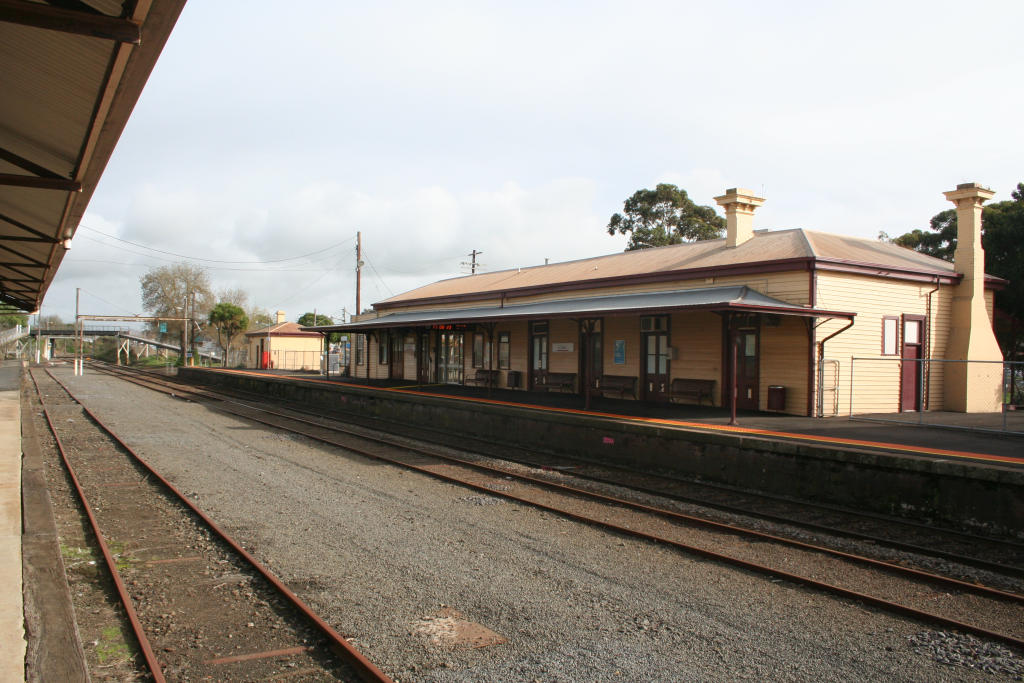
Colac railway station is served by V/Line on the Warrnambool railway line

The Princes Highway (part of Australia's circumnavigational Highway 1) runs through the city and forms its main street, Murray Street. The highway runs west toward Camperdown and east to Geelong and beyond to Melbourne. Several secondary sealed roads including the C161, C155 and C154 run south toward Apollo Bay and the coastal tourism areas of the Otway Ranges Great Ocean Road, The Twelve Apostles and the Shipwreck Coast. The Colac-Ballarat Road runs north connecting Colac to Ballarat via Cressy.

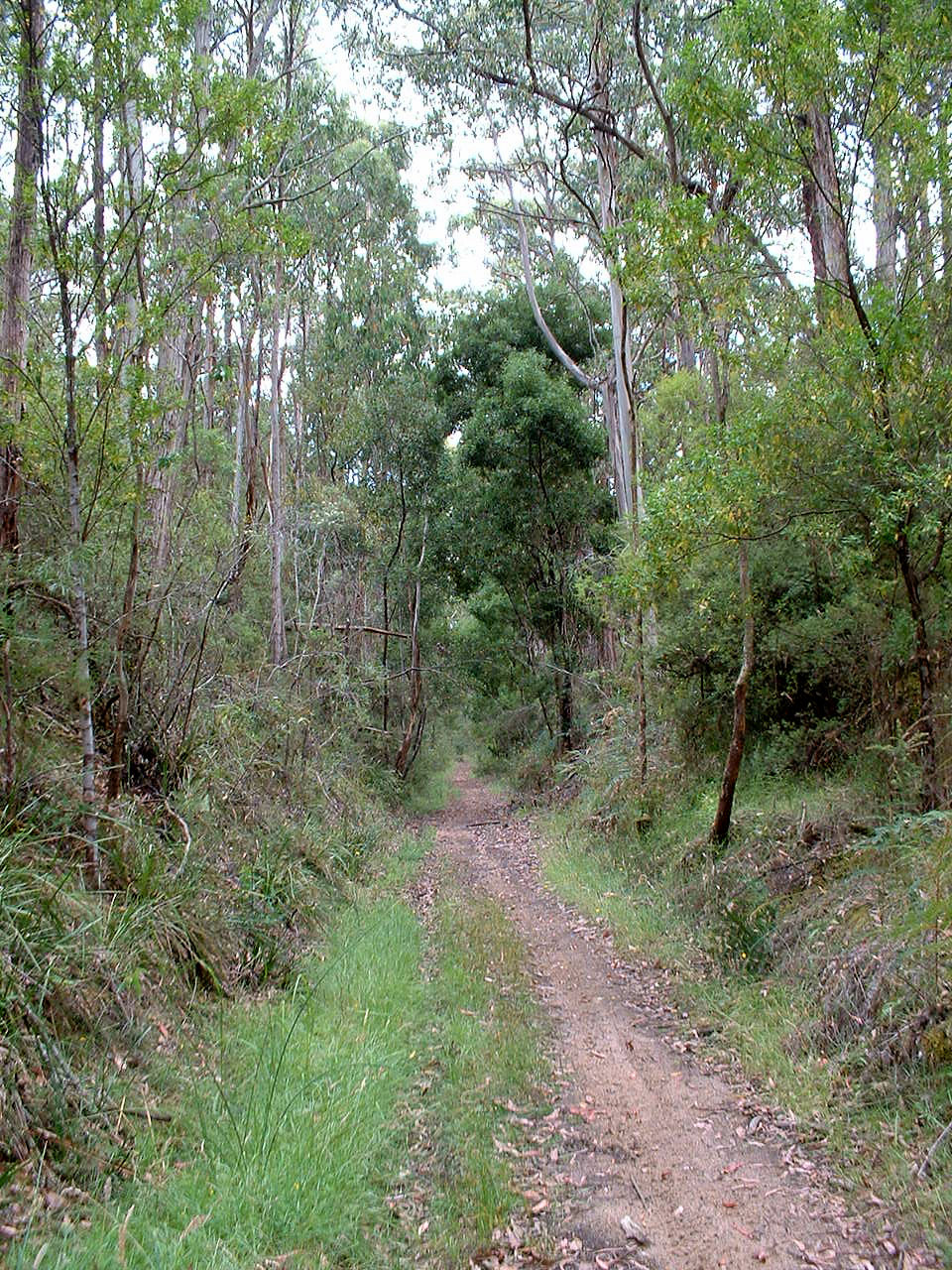
Old railway line from Colac to Beech Forest, now Old Beechy Rail Trail.

The railway through the town was opened in 1877, and extended from 1883 as part of the line to the south west of the state.

The Irrewarra-Cressy line towards Ballarat also ran from Colac between 1889 and 1953 and the Alvie line opened in 1923 and closed in 1954.

A narrow gauge branch line also originated from the town, the branch line to Beech Forest opened in 1902 and was extended to Crowes in 1911, finally closing in 1962. The route of the abandoned railway has been developed as the Old Beechy Rail Trail.

The local railway station is served by V/Line passenger services on the Warrnambool line. The train stops at Camperdown and Terang.

== Events ==
Colac was the home of the annual "Cliff Young Australian 6-day race". The event, which was originally orchestrated by Stuart Walker, occurred for over 20 years until 2006 and is a running/walking event. It was held on the Memorial Square which is right in the heart of Colac and attracted entries from all over the world.

Also held at the Memorial Square is the annual Colac KANA festival taking place on the third Saturday of March. Many market stalls, children's entertainment and a song and dance stage can be found at the festival. The most popular feature of the festival is its parade through the streets of Colac's CBD. The parade showcases local primary schools and their students as well as local clubs, emergency service organisations and businesses.

On the last week-end of October, first weekend in November the Colac Otway Arts Trail takes place. Featuring artists, studios and galleries in the Colac Otway Shire the trail also feature the 'Art Walk on Murray' where local artists display their work in the windows of the shops along the Murray Street precinct.

== Industry ==
With a wealth of natural resources, such as agriculture and timber, Colac has a strong manufacturing background, with major local employers including Bulla Dairy Foods, Australian Lamb Company, and AKD Softwoods.

While historically the region supported numerous successful brickworks, nowadays the major primary industries are agriculture, such as the dairy, beef, lamb and fine-wool merino industries.

== Sister city ==
Colac is the sister city of Walker, Michigan, US.

== Climate ==
Colac has a temperate mediterranean climate (Csb) with mild summers and cool damp winters, with chilly nights year round owing to its far southern location on the Australian mainland. It records only 55.3 clear days on average, with 181.0 cloudy days.

Climate data for Colac (Shire Office, 1899–1983, rainfall 1898–2021); 38.34° S, 143.58° E
Month	Jan	Feb	Mar	Apr	May	Jun	Jul	Aug	Sep	Oct	Nov	Dec	Year
Record high °C (°F)	42.6 (108.7)	41.3 (106.3)	38.6 (101.5)	32.2 (90.0)	26.4 (79.5)	21.7 (71.1)	21.2 (70.2)	25.2 (77.4)	28.3 (82.9)	33.6 (92.5)	36.9 (98.4)	41.8 (107.2)	42.6 (108.7)
Mean daily maximum °C (°F)	25.7 (78.3)	26.0 (78.8)	23.5 (74.3)	19.3 (66.7)	15.8 (60.4)	13.1 (55.6)	12.5 (54.5)	13.7 (56.7)	15.8 (60.4)	18.3 (64.9)	20.8 (69.4)	23.4 (74.1)	19.0 (66.2)
Mean daily minimum °C (°F)	10.7 (51.3)	11.2 (52.2)	10.1 (50.2)	8.0 (46.4)	6.2 (43.2)	4.5 (40.1)	3.9 (39.0)	4.5 (40.1)	5.8 (42.4)	6.8 (44.2)	8.3 (46.9)	9.4 (48.9)	7.4 (45.3)
Record low °C (°F)	0.6 (33.1)	1.1 (34.0)	0.0 (32.0)	−3.9 (25.0)	−3.3 (26.1)	−4.7 (23.5)	−5.0 (23.0)	−3.9 (25.0)	−3.9 (25.0)	−3.3 (26.1)	−2.8 (27.0)	−0.6 (30.9)	−5.0 (23.0)
Average precipitation mm (inches)	36.8 (1.45)	34.2 (1.35)	41.4 (1.63)	56.0 (2.20)	69.0 (2.72)	73.7 (2.90)	75.2 (2.96)	86.9 (3.42)	75.2 (2.96)	71.0 (2.80)	56.8 (2.24)	44.3 (1.74)	727.1 (28.63)
Average precipitation days	7.7	6.7	9.3	12.5	16.5	17.4	19.5	19.6	17.3	15.4	12.2	10.0	164.1
Average afternoon relative humidity (%)	46	50	52	62	72	76	77	71	65	66	62	54	63

== Media ==
Colac has its own newspaper, The Colac Herald, published on Mondays, Wednesdays and Fridays. Colac is serviced by a number of local radio stations: 3CS 1134AM, MIXX FM 106.3 MHz, and OCR FM Community Radio Station 98.3 MHz and 88.7 MHz in Apollo Bay and surrounds. Narrowcast radio station 3GL 1341AM, owned and operated by Geelong Broadcasters, is also broadcasting in Colac on 88.0 MHz, transmitting on a power of 1-watt. Some FM radio services direct from Ballarat, including ABC Ballarat, 3BA and Power FM can also be received clearly in Colac.

Most digital terrestrial television services are received via UHF from Ballarat Lookout Hill. In addition to the Ballarat service, a local repeater on nearby Warrion Hill provides an alternative source of television reception. Currently, the television station channels available include Network 10, 10HD, 10 Drama, 10 Comedy, Nickelodeon and News24 Regional. These stations are now broadcast by Network 10 after affiliate changes occurred in July 2021 and the station was acquired, owned and operated directly from the network since March 2025. This change included Nine, 9Gem, 9Go! and 9Life which are owned by Nine Network except TVSN which is owned by the Seven Network but is now broadcast by WIN Television who also transmit WIN HD channel 9HD and GOLD. The city also receives Seven, 7two, 7mate, ishop tv, Racing.com, 7Bravo and 7flix (sub-licensees of the Seven Network) which were unaffected by July's change.

In addition to commercial television services, Colac receives Government ABC Television which includes ABC TV, ABC HD, ABC Family (Daily from 7.30pm to 2am, Station Close daily from 2am to 5am), ABC Kids (Daily from 5am to 7.30pm), ABC Entertains (Daily from 6am to 11pm approximately) and ABC News as well as the SBS's owned channels of SBS, SBS HD, SBS2, National Indigenous Television, SBS Food, SBS World Movies and SBS WorldWatch. Analog Television transmissions ceased on Thursday 5 May 2011 as part of the Federal Government's nationwide plan for Digital terrestrial television in Australia, which involves switching over all television broadcast services from analog systems to digital DVB-T systems.

FM radio services direct from Melbourne and Geelong can be received in Colac but signal levels are low. Television services direct from Melbourne can be received in Colac but large antenna arrays must be used with mixed results.

Colac is serviced by Foxtel delivered by DTH satellite transmission, via Optus C1 Ku Band Satellite located at 156E.

== Sport ==
Colac is home to a number of teams in the Colac & District Football and Netball League combining both Australian rules football clubs and netball clubs from around the district. Central Reserve is the premier sporting facility in the town.

The Colac Football Club, formerly of the CDFNL, competes in the Geelong Football League. Colac is also the hometown of Luke Hodge, from 2002 a player with Hawthorn Football Club (captain 2011 to 2016) and player with Brisbane Football Club in the Australian Football League since October 2017.

Colac has a horse racing club, the Colac Turf Club, which schedules around four race meetings a year including the Colac Cup meeting in February. It also has a picnic horse racing club, Colac St Patrick Picnic, which holds its one race meeting a year in March.

Golfers play at the Colac Golf Club on Colac–Lavers Hill Road, Elliminyt.

Colac has a swimming club which trains swimmers and has athletes competing at Region, State and national competitions.

Colac has a baseball club, the Colac Braves, a team which competes in the Geelong Baseball Association winter competition and the Pan-Pacific Masters Games on the Gold Coast. The Colac Braves also cater for players aged 5 to 15. The Braves have claimed recent premiership success in the Geelong Baseball Association with wins in 2008, 2009 and 2010.

The Colac Otway Rovers AFC is the region's only football (soccer) club established in 2010. The club entered the Football Federation Victoria—Geelong Region in 2011—fielding a team in the Men's Division 3 Competition. The Colac Otway Rovers conducts a Small Sided Football Program for juniors and an indoor soccer competition.

The Colac Basketball Association hosts summer and winter competitions at Colac's Bluewater stadium. The clubs are Saints, Hawks, Demons and Rebels. The association also has representative teams known as the Kookas. The juniors compete in tournaments, while the senior teams compete in Basketball Victoria Country's Country Basketball League.

== Notable people ==
- Keith Doig MC – footballer, doctor, 1891–1949.
- Amon Buchanan, AFL player, b. 1982
- Aaron Finch – cricketer, b. 1986.
- Athol Guy AO – musician, b. 1940.
- Alison Harcourt AO (née Doig) – mathematician and statistician, b. 1929.
- Andrew Perkins – economist – b. 1967.
- Luke Hodge – footballer, b. 1984.
- R. M. Murray – mine manager, 1877–1945.
- Craig Spence – golfer, b. 1974.
- Stephen Walker – sculptor, 1927–2014.
- H. A. Willis – writer, b. 1948.
- Wil Traval – actor, b. 1980.
- Zara Walters- netballer, b. 2003
