= Charles Wilson =

Charles, Charlie, Charley, or Chuck Wilson may refer to:

== Academics ==
- Charles Edward Wilson (educationalist) (1815–1888), Scottish teacher and educationalist
- Charles Robert Wilson (1863–1904), English academic and historian of British India
- Charles Wilson (political scientist) (1909–2002), Scottish political scientist and university administrator
- Charles Wilson (historian) (1914–1991), English business historian and Cambridge University professor
- Charles Wilson (economist), American economist and academic administrator

== Arts and entertainment ==
- Charles Heath Wilson (1809–1882), Anglo-Scottish painter, art teacher and author
- Charles Wilson (Scottish architect) (1810–1861), Scottish architect
- Charles C. Wilson (architect) (1864–1933), American architect
- Charles J. A. Wilson (1880–1965), Scottish-born American artist, painter, etcher, and illustrator
- Charles J. Wilson (1894–1974), American screenwriter and director
- Charles C. Wilson (1894–1948), American film actor
- Charles Morrow Wilson (1905–1977), American writer
- Charles Banks Wilson (1918–2013), American artist
- Charles Wilson (composer) (1931–2019), Canadian composer and choral conductor
- Chuck Wilson (jazz musician) (1948–2018), American jazz musician
- Charlie Wilson (singer) (born 1953), American R&B singer; frontman of the Gap Band
- Ricky Wilson (singer) (Charles Richard Wilson, born 1978), English musician, lead singer of Kaiser Chiefs and judge on The Voice
- BLKBOK, professional name of Charles Wilson III, American musician

== Business and industry ==
- Charles Anthony Corbett Wilson (1827–1923), Australian civil engineer
- Charles Rivers Wilson (1831–1916), British civil servant and financier
- Charles Alfred Wilson (1855–1935), American civil engineer
- Charles Corbett Powell Wilson (c.1857–c.1938), Australian civil engineer
- Charles G. Wilson (fl. 1880s–1890s), American financier and businessman
- Charles Edward Wilson (businessman) (1886–1972), American businessman; CEO of General Electric
- Charles Kemmons Wilson (1913–2003), American hotelier; founder of Holiday Inn chain
- Charles T. Wilson (1879–1974), American businessman; crude rubber importer
- Chuck Wilson (multimedia executive) (born 1968), American entrepreneur

== Law and politics ==
=== United Kingdom ===
- Charles Wilson, 1st Baron Nunburnholme (1833–1907), English shipowner, Liberal member of parliament (MP)
- Charles Wilson (Conservative politician) (1859–1930), British politician; MP for Leeds Central
- Charles Wilson, 2nd Baron Nunburnholme (1875–1924), British politician; MP for Hull West

=== United States ===
- Charles Wilson (Nebraska politician) (1900–1967), state legislator in Nebraska
- Charlie Wilson (Ohio politician) (1943–2013), U.S. congressman, previously state representative, then state senator
- Charlie Wilson (Texas politician) (1933–2010), U.S. congressman from Texas, 1973–1997; previously state representative, then state senator
- Charles Wilson (Vermont politician), state legislator in Vermont
- Charles Burnett Wilson (1850–1926), marshal of the Kingdom of Hawaii
- Charles Erwin Wilson (1890–1961), US secretary of defense (1953–1957) and head of General Motors
- Charles H. Wilson (1917–1984), U.S. congressman from California and State Assemblyman
- Malcolm Wilson (politician) (Charles Malcolm Wilson, 1914–2000), Governor of New York
- Charles R. Wilson (judge) (born 1954), American federal judge

=== Elsewhere ===
- Charles Wilson (Quebec politician) (1808–1877), Canadian politician; senator and member of the Legislative Council of Quebec
- Charles Wilson (British Columbia politician) (1841–1924), Canadian politician
- Charles Wilson (Australian politician) (1842–1926), member of the New South Wales Parliament
- Charles Wilson (librarian) (1857–1932), New Zealand politician; MP and parliamentary librarian
- Charles Wilson (New Zealand Reform Party politician) (1862–1934), New Zealand member of parliament

== Military ==
- Charles Wilson (sailor) (1836–?), Union Navy sailor during the American Civil War
- Charles E. Wilson (Medal of Honor) (1840–1915), American Civil War sergeant
- Charles Edward Wilson (rugby union) (1871–1914), British military officer and rugby union player
- Chuck Wilson (pilot) (born 1953), American USAF military officer

== Science and medicine ==
- Sir Charles Wilson (British Army officer) (1836–1905), English geographer and archaeologist
- Charles Branch Wilson (1861–1941), American marine biologist
- C. T. R. Wilson (Charles Thomson Rees Wilson, 1869–1959), Scottish physicist awarded the Nobel Prize
- Charles Wilson, 1st Baron Moran (1882–1977), British physician; personal doctor to Winston Churchill
- Charles Byron Wilson (1929–2018), American neurosurgeon

== Sports ==
=== Association football (soccer) ===
- Charles Plumpton Wilson (1859–1938), English footballer
- Charlie Wilson (footballer, born 1877) (1877–?), English footballer for Liverpool and Stockport County
- Charlie Wilson (footballer, born 1895) (1895–1971), English footballer for Spurs, Huddersfield Town and Stoke City
- Charlie Wilson (footballer, born 1904) (1904–1994), English footballer for Grimsby Town
- Charlie Wilson (footballer, born 1905) (1905–1985), English footballer for West Bromwich Albion, Sheffield Wednesday
- Charlie Wilson (Burnley footballer) (fl. 1940s), English footballer for Burnley

=== Baseball ===
- Charley Wilson (1895–1965), American Negro leagues baseball player
- Charlie Wilson (baseball) (1905–1970), American baseball player for the Boston Braves and St. Louis Cardinals
- Chuck Wilson (baseball) (1929–1983), American Negro leagues baseball player

=== Other sports ===
- Charles Wilson (fencer) (1865–1950), British Olympic fencer
- Charles Wilson (cricketer) (1869–1952), Australian cricketer who played mainly in New Zealand
- Chilla Wilson (Charles Roy Wilson, 1931–2016), Australian rugby union player and manager
- Chuck Wilson (sports journalist) (born 1954), American sports journalist
- Charles Wilson (American football) (born 1968), American football wide receiver
- Wade Wilson (American football) (Charles Wade Wilson, 1959–2019), an American football player and coach
- Chuck Wilson (sprinter) (born 1968), American sprinter

== Other people ==
- Charlie Wilson (criminal) (1932–1990), English career criminal, one of the Great Train Robbery gang
- Charles Wilson (journalist) (1935–2022), Scottish-born newspaper editor
- Charles Wilson (missionary) (1770–1857), British missionary in the South Pacific

== Other uses ==
- Charles E. Wilson (1973 ship), launched in 1973 named for Charles E. Wilson

== See also ==
- Charles-Avila Wilson (1869–1936), Canadian lawyer, politician, and judge
- Charles Wilsonn (1752–1829), member of parliament for Bewdley, 1814–1818
