= Lakes and other water bodies of Victoria (Australia) =

The following is a list of naturally occurring lakes and other water bodies in Victoria, Australia; outside the Greater Melbourne area, in alphabetical order, for those lakes with a surface area greater than 70 hectares (170 acres):

Lake name	Type	Region	Primary inflow	Primary outflow	Area		Image	Notes
Lake name	Type	Region	Primary inflow	Primary outflow	hectares	acres	Image	Notes
Albacutya	Eutrophic	Wimmera	Outlet Creek	Evaporation	5,500	14,000		
Barracoota	Freshwater	East Gippsland			240	590		
Beeac	Hypersaline	Western District Lakes		Evaporation	560	1,400		
Boga	Freshwater water storage	The Mallee		outfall channel to the Little Murray River	940	2,300		
Bookar		Barwon South West		Evaporation	450	1,100		
Borrie	Coastal wetland	Greater Geelong	Little River	Port Phillip Bay	70	170		
Bullen Merri	Brackish crater	Barwon South West		Evaporation	460	1,100		
Buloke	Eutrophic	Wimmera	Richardson River	Evaporation	4,300	11,000		
Burrumbeet	Eutrophic	Western Victoria	Burrumbeet Creek	Evaporation	2,300	5,700		
Colac	Freshwater	Barwon South West	Barongarook Creek	Evaporation	2,800	6,900		
Coleman	Freshwater	Gippsland	Latrobe River	Bass Strait	1,300	3,200		
Colungulac	Saline	Western District Lakes		Evaporation	1,500	3,700		
Condah	Crater lake	Barwon South West	Darlot Creek	Evaporation	250	620		
Connewarre	Estuarine	Bellarine Peninsula	Barwon River	Barwon River	880	2,200		
Coorong	Eutrophic	Wimmera	Yarriambiack Creek	Evaporation	100	250		
Coradgil	Freshwater	Western District Lakes		Evaporation	78	190		
Corangamite	Hypersaline, endorheic	Western District Lakes	Woady Yaloak River	Evaporation	17,000	42,000		
Cundare	Hypersaline	Western District Lakes		Evaporation	280	690		
Deep	Freshwater	Western Victoria		Evaporation	85	210		
Elingamite	Freshwater	Western District Lakes	Elingamite Creek	Evaporation	300	740		
Gnarpurt	Saline	Western District Lakes		Evaporation	2,350	5,800		
Gnotuk								
Hindmarsh	Eutrophic	Wimmera	Wimmera River	Outlet Creek	13,500	33,000		
Hume	Reservoir	Hume	Murray River	Murray River	20,190	49,900		
Keilambete								
King	Freshwater	Gippsland	Tambo River; Mitchell River	to Bass Strait	4,400	11,000		
Learmonth								
Logan								
Marmal		Wimmera		Evaporation	130	320		
Martin	Freshwater	Western District Lakes	Woady Yaloak River	Woady Yaloak River	2,200	5,400		
Milangil	Saline	Western District Lakes						
Mokoan	Reservoir	Hume	Broken River	Evaporation	9,400	23,000		
Monbeong								
Mulwala	Reservoir		Murray River	Murray River	6,600	16,000		
Murdeduke	Saline	Western District Lakes						
Nagambie	Reservoir	Goldfields	Goulburn River	Goulburn River	170	420		
Narracan	Reservoir	West Gippsland	Latrobe River	Latrobe River	281	690		
Purrumbete	Crater lake	Western District Lakes		Evaporation	552	1,360		
Reedy	Freshwater	Bellarine Peninsula	Barwon River	Barwon River	550	1,400		
Reeve	Freshwater	Gippsland	Carr Creek	to Bass Strait	5,200	13,000		
Rosine								
Round								
Tali Karng	formed by a natural landslide	Alpine	Snowden Creek, Nigothoruk Creek	underground to Wellington River	14	35		
Terangoon	Freshwater	Western District Lakes			208	510		
Tutchewop	Freshwater	The Mallee		Evaporation	760	1,900		
Tyrrell	Salt lake	Mallee	Tyrrell Creek	Evaporation	20,860	51,500		
Tyers	Freshwater	Gippsland	Boggy Creek; Stony Creek	to Bass Strait	950	2,300		
Victoria (Bellarine)	Saline	Bellarine Peninsula		to Bass Strait	139	340		
Victoria (Gippsland)	Freshwater	Gippsland	Latrobe River; Mitchell River	to Bass Strait	15,000	37,000		
Weeranganuk	Freshwater	Barwon South West		Evaporation	460	1,100		
Wellington	Freshwater	Gippsland	Latrobe River; Avon River	to Bass Strait	15,000	37,000		
Wendouree	Freshwater	Goldfields	Gong Gong Reservoir	Evaporation	238	590		
William Hovell	Reservoir	Alpine	King River	King River	113	280		

== See also ==
- Lakes and Reservoirs in Melbourne
