= Martin Lake =

Martin Lake may refer to several places:

In Australia

- Lake Martin (Victoria), a lake in Victoria

In Canada

- Martin Lake (Nova Scotia), in Dartmouth, Nova Scotia
- Martin Lake (Saskatchewan), in Northern Saskatchewan
- Martin Lake (British Columbia), in the Chilcotin area of British Columbia

In the United States

- Lake Martin in Louisiana swamps, Louisiana
- Lake Martin, Alabama
- Logan Martin Lake, Talladega and St. Clair Counties, Alabama
- Martin Lake Power Plant, a coal-fired power plant in Tatum, Texas
- Martins Fork Lake, Harlan County, Kentucky
- Martin Lake, Minnesota, census-designated place in Linwood Township, Anoka County, Minnesota
- Martin Lake (Anoka County, Minnesota), in Linwood Township, Anoka County, Minnesota
- Martin Lake (Martin County, Minnesota)
- Martin Lake (Blaine County, Montana), in Blaine County, Montana
- Martin Lake (Carbon County, Montana), in Carbon County, Montana
- Martin Lake (Granite County, Montana), in Granite County, Montana
- Martin Lake (Hill County, Montana), in Hill County, Montana
- Martin Lake (Powell County, Montana), in Powell County, Montana
