= Woolcock =

Woolcock is a surname. Notable people with the surname include:

- Charles Woolcock (died 1891), 19th century Member of Parliament from Westland, New Zealand
- Elizabeth Woolcock (1848–1873), hanged in Adelaide Gaol for the murder of her husband Thomas Woolcock by mercury poisoning
- Iris Woolcock, artist, photographer, realtor and adventurer
- John Laskey Woolcock (1862–1929), barrister and Supreme Court judge in Queensland, Australia
- Marjorie Woolcock (1898–1965), Australian painter and sculptor
- Penny Woolcock (born 1950), British filmmaker, opera director, and screenwriter
- Peter Woolcock (1926–2014) British, born in Argentina, illustrator, political cartoonist in Bermuda, uncle to Penny Woolcock
- William Woolcock (1878–1947), Liberal Party politician in England
