= Mount Warrenheip =

Mountain in Victoria, Australia

Mount Warrenheip (Warrengeep)
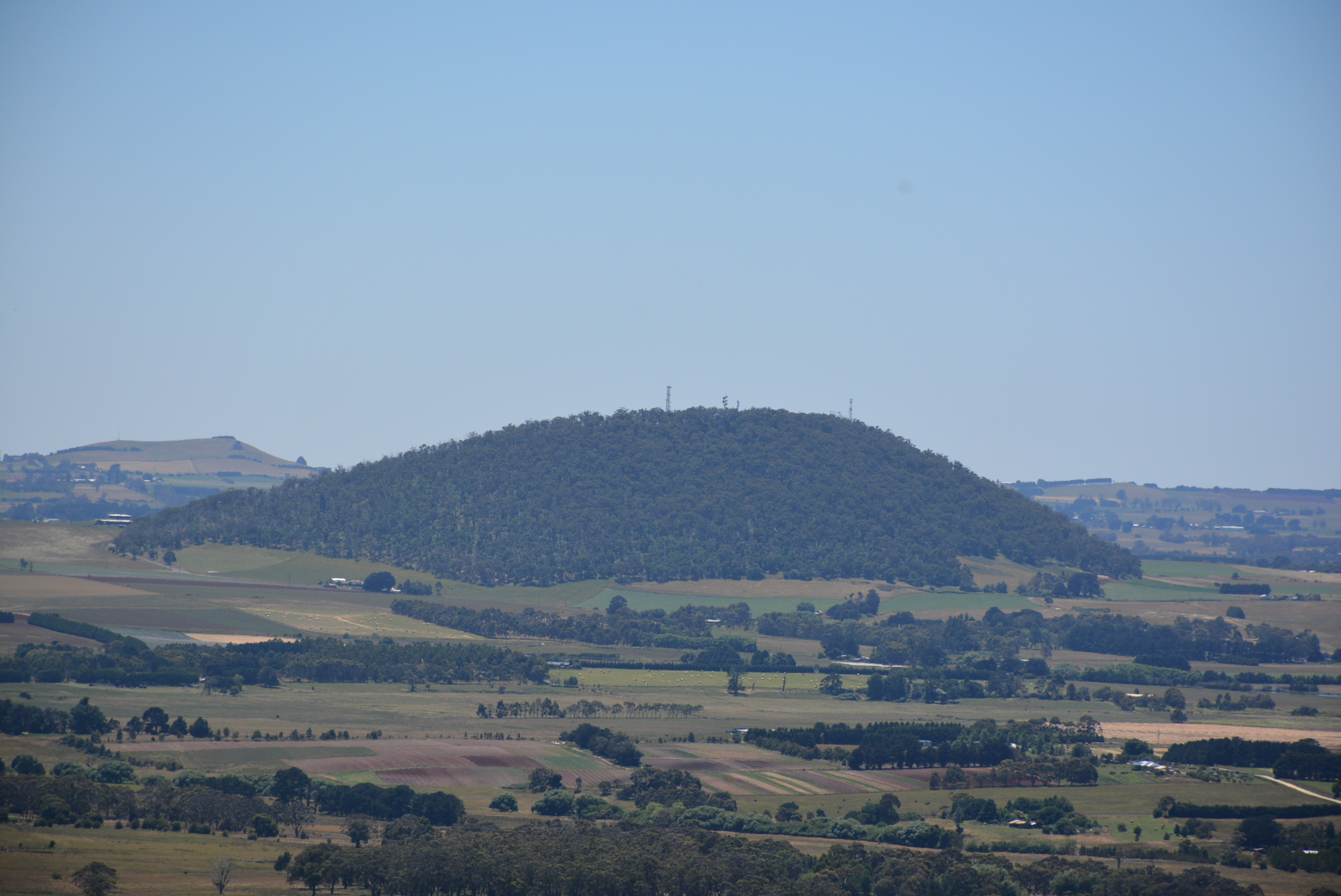
- Mount Warrenheip, viewed from Mount Buninyong

Highest point
- Elevation: 741 metres (2,431 ft) AHD
- Listing: List of volcanoes in Australia
- Coordinates: 37°34′S 143°57′E

Geography
- Location within Victoria
- Location: Warrenheip, Australia

Mount Warrenheip /wɒrənˈhiːp/ (Wathawarrung: Warrengeep) is an inactive scoria volcanic cone in Victoria, Australia. The mountain has an elevation of 746 metres (2,448 ft) AHD. A landmark of Dunnstown, the closest town, the mountain is 9 kilometres (5.6 mi) east of the Ballarat central business district, in the locality of Warrenheip.

Snow falls on Warrenheip on average seven days a year. In heavy winters it may be snowcapped for a short period. It experiences a climate similar to nearby Ballarat however is often a few degrees colder owing to its elevation and exposure to the wind.

Mount Warrenheip last erupted around 1,000,000 years ago. Along with nearby Mount Buninyong, it is one of only two forested scoria cones in Victoria.

== Location and features ==
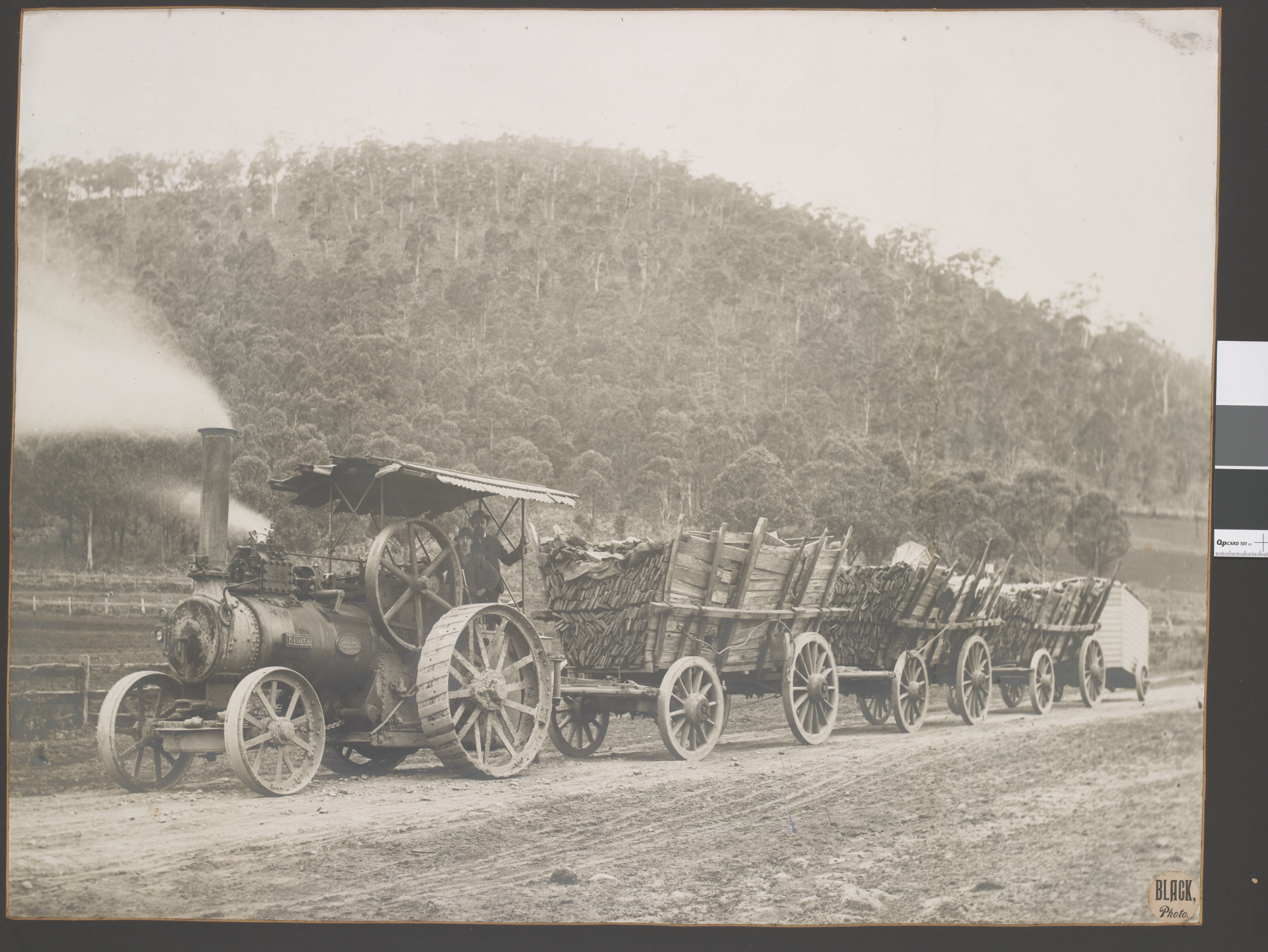
Steam traction engine, pulling three timber wagons. The engine bears the nameplate "George" and is manufactured by John Fowler Steam Plough Works, Leeds.

Mount Warrenheip is surrounded by farmland. The foothills are the location of Kryal Castle and cattle grazing.

The name Warrenheip originates from the Wathaurong word Warrengeep, meaning "emu's feathers" in reference to the resemblance of the fern like vegetation coverage which once covered it. In spring, forget-me-not flowers appear on the slopes. Most of the mountain is designated as a nature conservation reserve and there are a small number of koalas and wallabies in residence.

Hundreds of trees on the mountain have died in recent decades from an unknown cause, predominantly peppermints, manna gums and stringy bark gums.

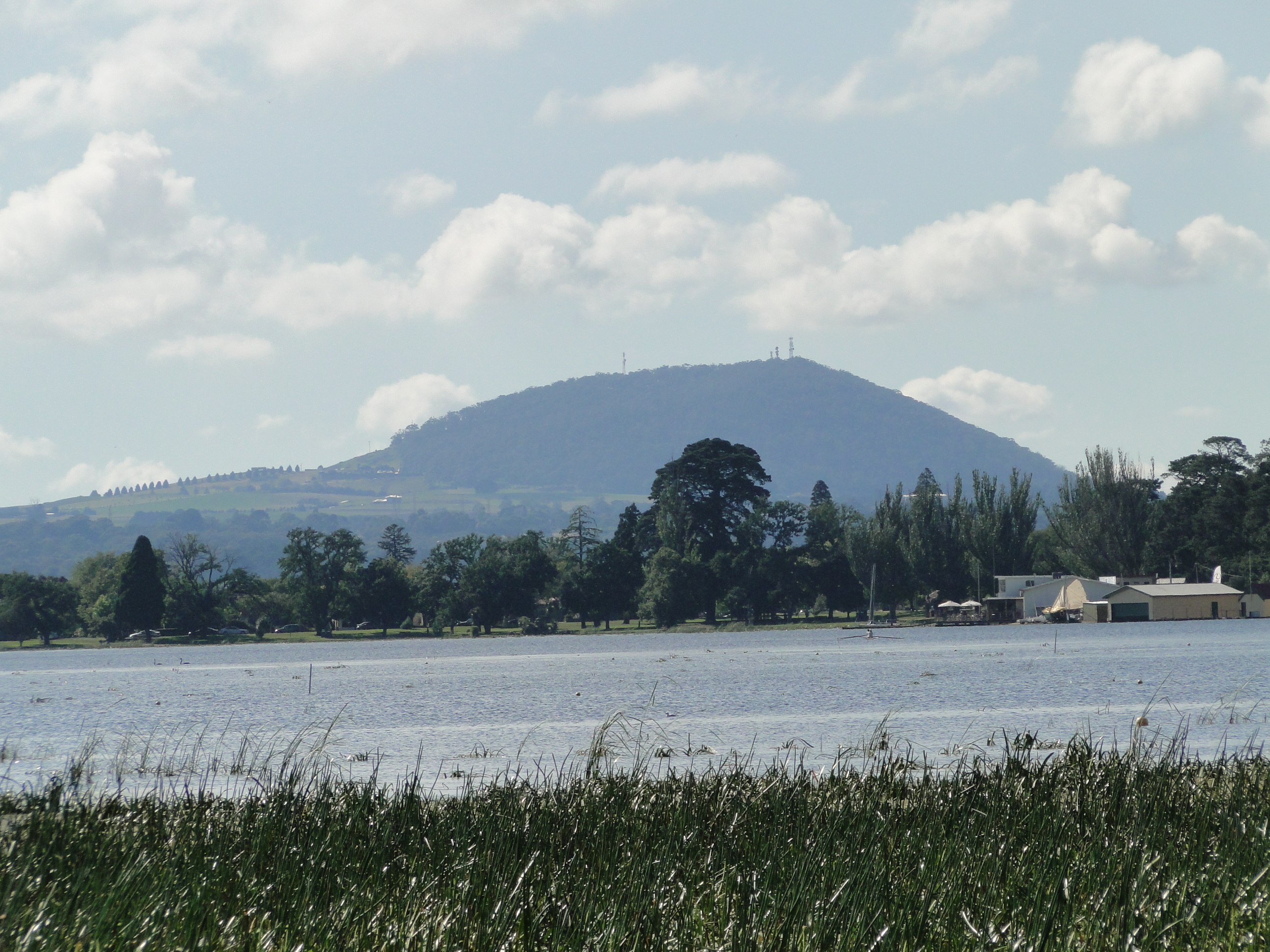
Mount Warrenheip Victoria

The mountain was subjected to fire in 1866, 1901, 1939 and again in February 2013.

Mount Warrenheip has four telecommunications towers installed at its peak, including antennae for radio 3BA, Voice FM 99.9, ABC News Radio, Telstra mobile and WiMax services, an amateur radio repeater and police dispatch radio.

== See also ==
- List of mountains in Australia § Victoria
