= Lake Martin (Victoria) =

Freshwater lake in Victoria, Australia

- Location in Victoria
- Location: Western District Lakes, Victoria
- Coordinates: 38°04′00″S 143°34′40″E
- Type: Freshwater
- Primary inflows: Woady Yaloak River
- Primary outflows: Woady Yaloak River
- Basin countries: Australia
- Surface area: 2,200 ha (5,400 acres)

Lake Martin is a shallow 2,200-hectare (5,400-acre) freshwater lake on the Woady Yaloak River in the Western District Lakes region of southwest Victoria, in Australian. The lake is situated adjacent to, and upstream from, the hypersaline Lake Corangamite. It is a shallow lake with a depth of less than 5 metres.

== See also ==
- List of lakes of Australia § Victoria
