= Pitfield Bridge =

Pitfield bridge
- Coordinates: 37.808525°S 143.585649°E
- Carries: [C143] Rokewood-Skipton Road
- Crosses: Woady Yaloak Creek
- Locale: Rokewood, Victoria, Australia

Characteristics
- Design: Wrought Iron Warren truss
- Total length: 53 metres (173 ft 11 in)
- Width: 6.1 metres (20 ft 0 in)
- Longest span: 26 metres (85 ft 4 in)

History
- Opened: c1859; c1898 (reconstructed spans)

Location
- Interactive map of Pitfield bridge

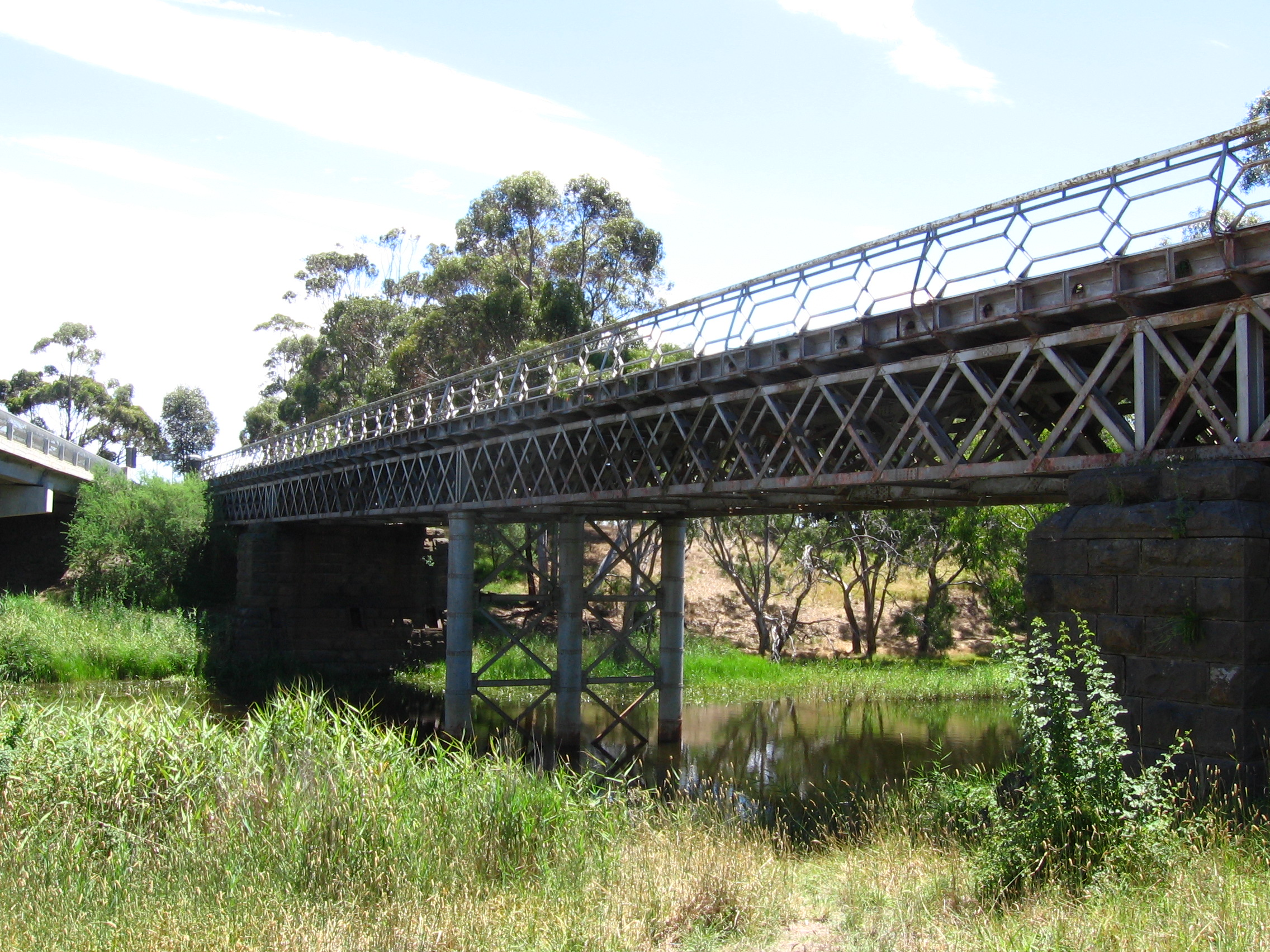
CressyBridge.JPG

Pitfield Bridge, is a riveted wrought iron, Warren truss road bridge, located over the Woady Yaloak Creek on the Rokewood-Skipton Road near Pitfield in Victoria, Australia. The bridge was originally constructed in the late 1850s, by the Woady Yallock Roads Board, and modified later in the century by construction of a large riveted wrought iron truss span.

A wooden bridge was evidently in place in 1859, when the Victorian parliament called for the approaches to the bridge to be improved. The bridge is on the same road as McMillans Bridge which was erected by the Victorian Central Road Board around the same time to a design of Charles Rowland, a student of prominent colonial engineer David Lennox. Repairs, presumably to the timber spans, were made in the same year, suggesting the bridge had already been standing for some time. Repairs were eventually carried out in 1863.

Later in the century the timber span was replaced with a riveted wrought iron truss designed by Charles Anthony Corbett Wilson for the Shire of Grenville. Wilson was influenced in this bridge design by the efficient and lightweight truss designs of Professor W. C. Kernot of Melbourne University. He was also a particularly prolific Victorian shire engineer, whose career spanned more than 50 years. The bridge was on a historical route between Geelong and the 1850s goldfields at Ararat and Streatham. A notice of £400 being allocated to the bridge suggests the new trusses were installed in 1898. However, repair works on the bridge were also carried out in 1900. In 1967, the Rokewood-Skipton Road was realigned at Pitfield and a new bridge was built over the Woady Yaloak Creek.

The timber deck has a single layer of longitudinal planking on timber cross beams, which are bolted to the flanges of the truss top chords. Most of the timber has now rotted away. The bridge has two spans of 26 metres long with a deck about 7 metres wide. The wrought-iron Warren trusses are of unusually light construction, with each member sized according to the relative force applied.

The Bridge is registered by the National Trust of Australia.
