= McMillans Bridge =

McMillans bridge
- Coordinates: 37.870890°S 143.662160°E
- Carries: [C143] Rokewood-Skipton Road
- Crosses: Woady Yaloak River
- Locale: Rokewood, Victoria, Australia

Characteristics
- Design: Wrought Iron open web truss
- Total length: 30 metres (98 ft 5 in)
- Width: 6.1 metres (20 ft 0 in)
- Longest span: 29 metres (95 ft 2 in)

History
- Opened: 1856; 1889 (reconstructed spans)

Location
- Interactive map of McMillans bridge

McMillans Bridge is a riveted wrought-iron, open web truss bridge, located over the Woady Yaloak River on the Rokewood-Skipton Road between Rokewood and Werneth on a historical route between Geelong and the 1850s goldfields at Ararat and Streatham.

McMillans Bridge was originally constructed in 1856 with stone abutments and timber truss, by the Victorian Central Road Board to a design of Charles Rowland, a student of prominent colonial engineer David Lennox. In 1888-9 the timber span was replaced with a riveted wrought iron truss designed be Charles Anthony Corbett Wilson by for the Shires of Leigh and Grenville. Wilson was a particularly prolific Victorian shire engineer who was influenced in this and Pitfield Bridge by the lightweight and efficient metal truss designs of Professor W. C. Kernot of Melbourne University.

The 1889 wrought-iron spans were fabricated in Geelong at the Humble and Nicholson Vulcan Foundry and comprised two double-intersection deck-trusses, connected by iron cross bracing, and seated on the 1856 abutments of red sandstone. These abutments were originally made for a timber truss superstructure, which lasted only 33 years. The timber deck has a single layer of longitudinal planking on timber cross beams, which are bolted to the flanges of the truss top chords. The single span is 29 metres long with a deck 6.1 metres wide, later widened to 7.3 metres. The wrought-iron lattice-girder trusses are of unusually light construction.

The bridge is listed on the Victorian Heritage Register.
