= Charles Henry Wilson =

Charles Henry Wilson may refer to:

- Charles Wilson, 1st Baron Nunburnholme (1833–1907), English shipowner
- Charles Wilson (Conservative politician) (1859–1930), British politician
- Charles Wilson (historian) (1914–1991), English business historian

== See also ==
- Charles Wilson (disambiguation)
