= Lake Beeac =

Lake in Victoria, Australia

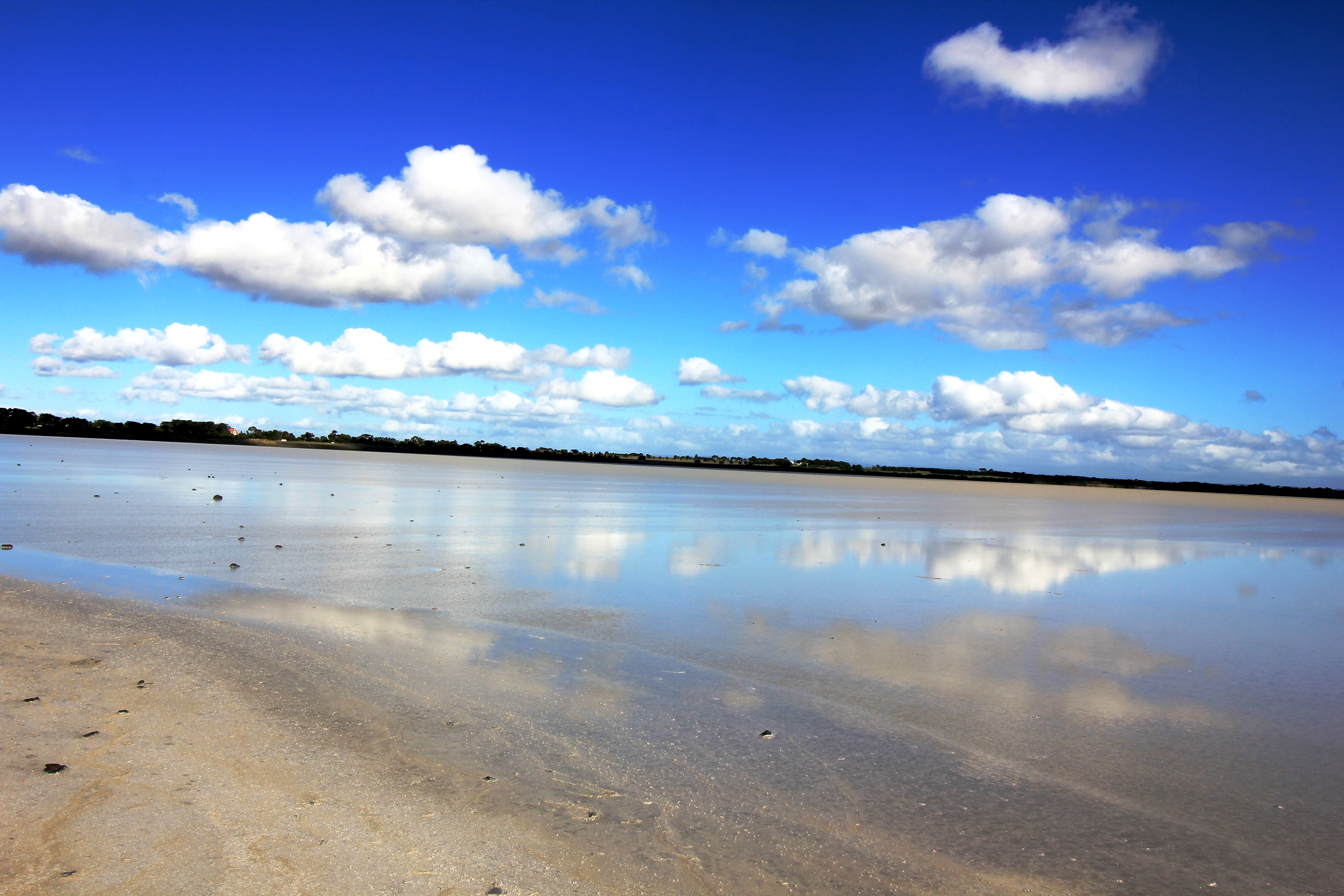
- Shallow water and the crystallizing of salt reflect the sky beautifully on Lake Beeac

- Location in Victoria
- Location: Western District Lakes, Victoria
- Coordinates: 38°12′18.5″S 143°36′59.5″E
- Type: Endorheic, hypersaline
- Primary outflows: Evaporation
- Basin countries: Australia
- Surface area: 560 ha (1,400 acres)

Lake Beeac, a hypersaline endorheic lake, is located beside the small town of Beeac in the Lakes and Craters region of the Victorian Volcanic Plains of south-west Victoria, in southeastern Australia. The 560-hectare (1,400-acre) lake is situated about 19 kilometres (12 mi) northeast of Colac, and its high salinity gives it a milky-blue colour. The lake is part of the Ramsar-listed Western District Lakes site, and enjoys international recognition of its wetland values and some protection for its waterbirds.

== Wildlife ==
Despite its extreme salinity, Lake Beeac supports brine shrimp which in turn feed water birds such as the banded stilt and the red-necked avocet. Birds have been known to come from as far as Siberia and China to eat the lake's shrimp. The lake is an important habitat for wetland water-birds. The lake forms part of the Lake Corangamite Complex Important Bird Area, so identified by BirdLife International because it sometimes supports globally important numbers of waterbirds.

== History ==
Between the late 1860s and the 1950s, salt works at Lake Beeac and other nearby lakes produced commercial quantities of salt. The Melbourne spice merchant Henry Berry established a salt works at Lake Cundare, just north of Beeac, in 1868 which produced salt by a boiling and crystallising process. The works produced a fine salt for domestic consumption under the label "Tower of London". Production ceased in 1895.

Lake Beeac was the main lake in the area used for the collecting of naturally crystallised salt during the summer months. This process produced a coarse salt that was sold for agricultural and industrial purposes. Production depended on the weather: during the hot dry summer of 1921, 3000 tonnes were produced, but in a wet summer no salt at all could be collected. Commercial production ceased in 1954, by which time cheaper production elsewhere had made the Lake Beeac salt uneconomical.

== See also ==
- List of lakes of Victoria
