= Charles Edward Wilson (educationalist) =

Scottish teacher and educationalist

Dr Charles Edward Wilson FRSE FSA FEIS LLD (1815–1888) was a 19th-century Scottish teacher and educationalist who was Scotland's first HM Chief Inspector of Schools following the Education (Scotland) Act 1872.

== Life ==
He was born on 31 August 1815 in Old Aberdeen. He was educated at Aberdeen Grammar School. He studied Classics at Aberdeen University graduating MA.

In 1848 he became Classics Master at Glasgow Academy. In 1852 he became Assistant Inspector of Schools in Glasgow and in 1859 was promoted to Inspector.

In 1870 Aberdeen University awarded him an honorary doctorate (LLD). In 1873/74 he became the first Chief Inspector of Schools for all Scotland and he relocated to Edinburgh.

He was elected a Fellow of the Royal Society of Edinburgh in 1877. His proposers were Philip Kelland, Peter Guthrie Tait, Alexander Buchan, and John Gibson Fleming.

He died at 19 Palmerston Place in Edinburgh on 18 March 1888. He is buried in Dean Cemetery.

== Family ==
In 1860 he was married to Joanne Farquharson Robertson (1840–1891) twenty five years his junior. Their children included Anne Louisa Wilson (1865–1937) and Andrew Robertson Wilson (1870–1932).
