= Lake Colac =

Freshwater lake in Victoria, Australia

- Coram
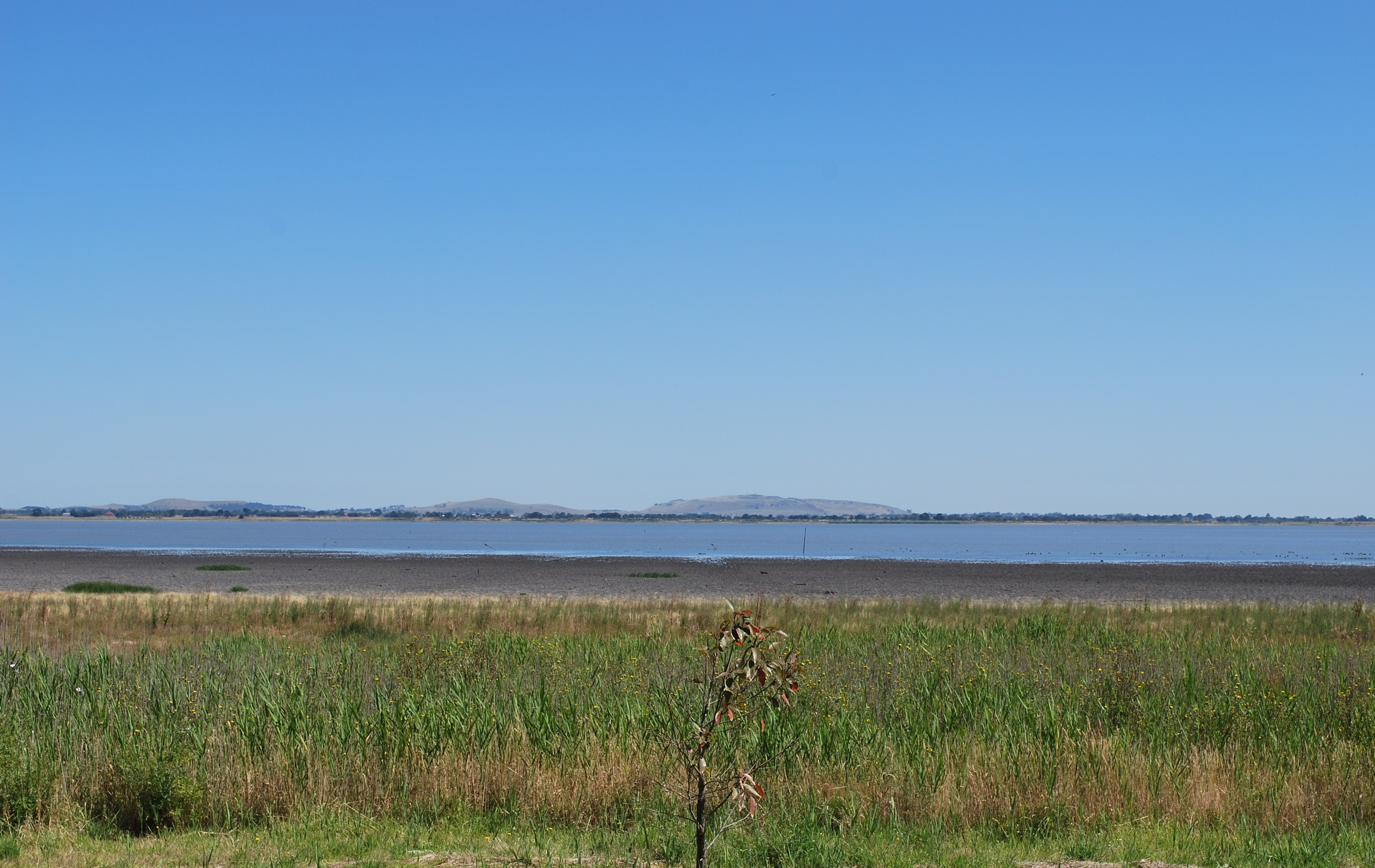
- Lake Colac, in January 2010, with historically low water levels

- Location in Victoria
- Location: Western District Lakes, Victoria
- Coordinates: 38°18′17″S 143°35′50″E
- Type: Freshwater
- Primary inflows: Barongarook Creek
- Basin countries: Australia
- Settlements: Colac

Lake Colac, a freshwater lake of the Western District Lakes, is located north of the Colac town centre in Victoria, Australia. The Aboriginal name for the lake is cited in a colonial report as Coram.

A yacht club and rowing club are located adjacent to the lake's shore. During the summer months, water skiers have access to the lake's facilities, and many birds may be found on the lake's surface and in the area. The foreshore has a playground, boat ramp and the Colac Botanical Gardens. In January 2009, the lake dried up after years of drought, and the first time in 173 years.

In April 2016 the lake dried up after several years of drought.

The Lake Colac bird sanctuary is nearby.

== Gallery ==
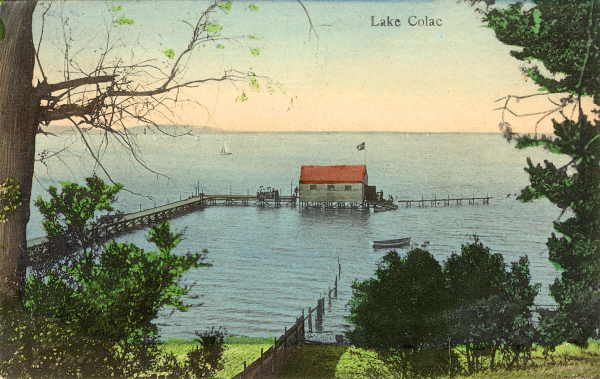
A postcard showing Lake Colac with water

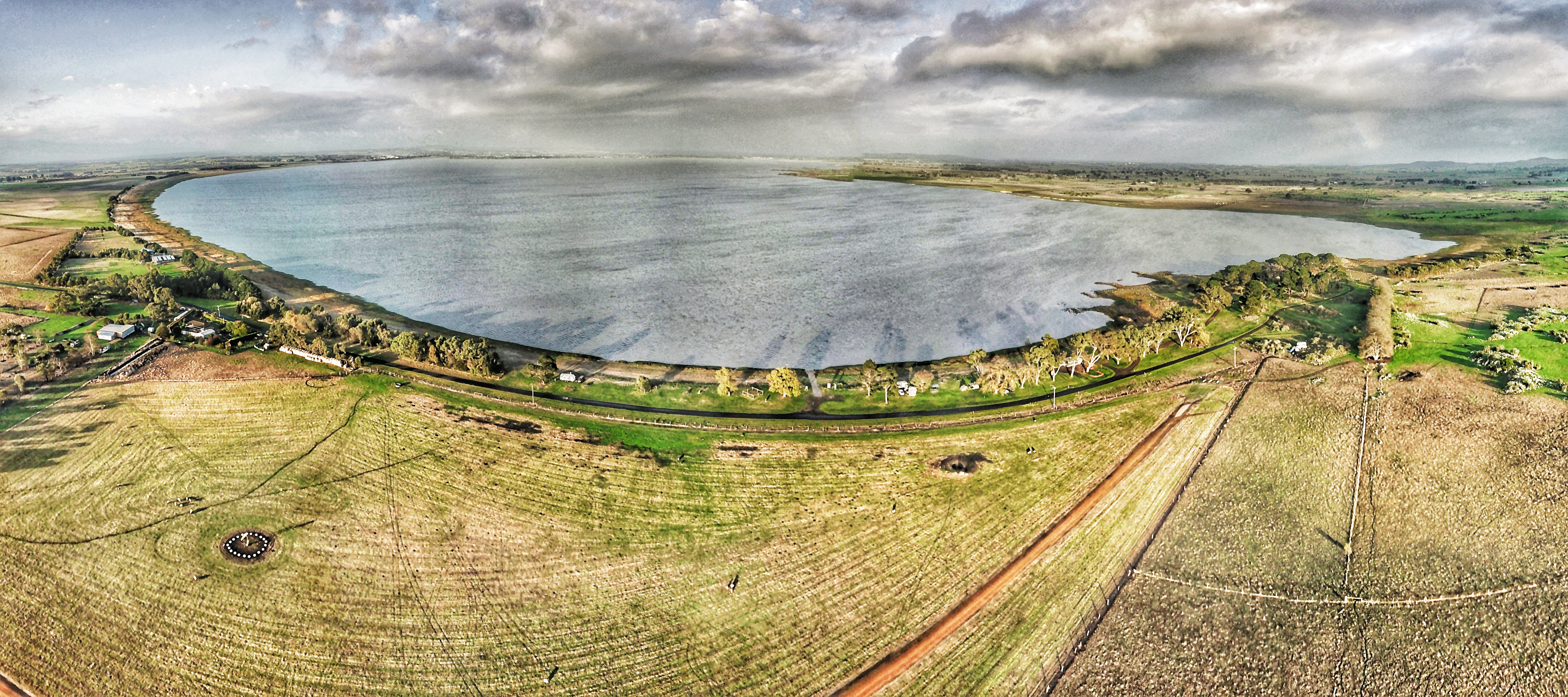
Lake Colac – Aerial perspective of Meredith Park campground

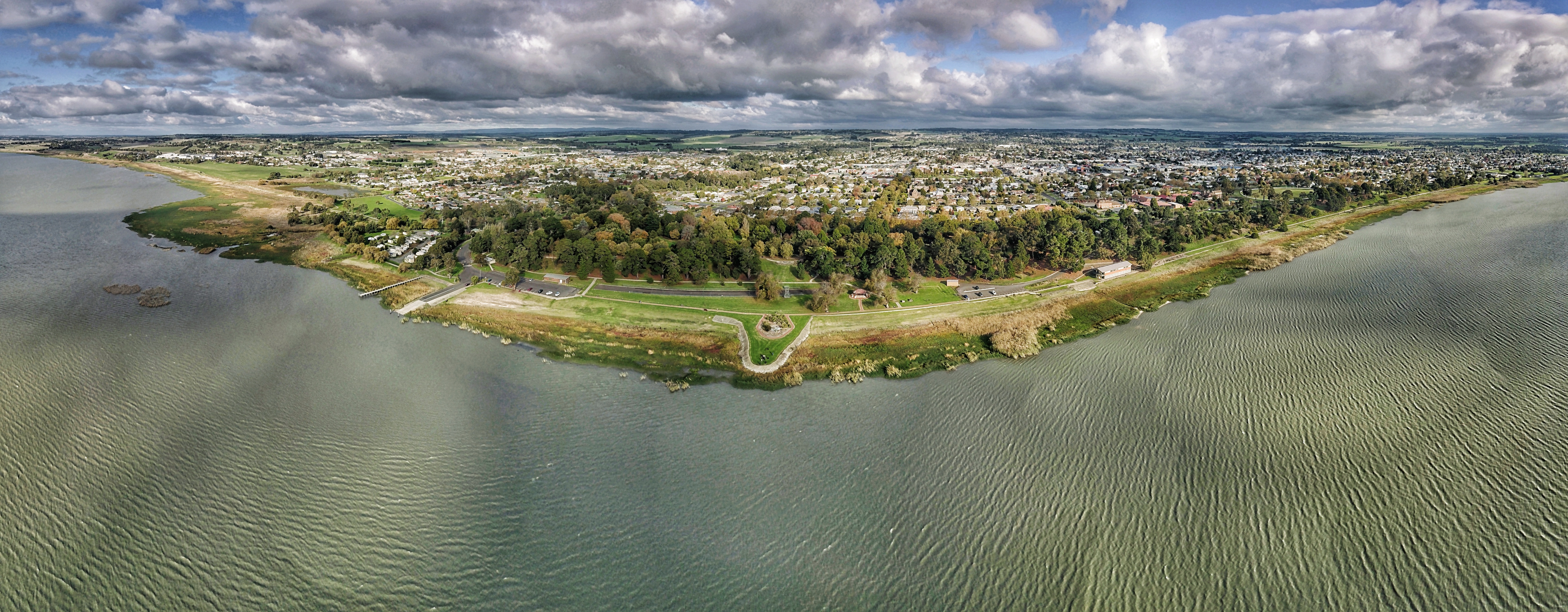
Aerial perspective of Lake Colac
