= Shelford Bridge =

Shelford bridge
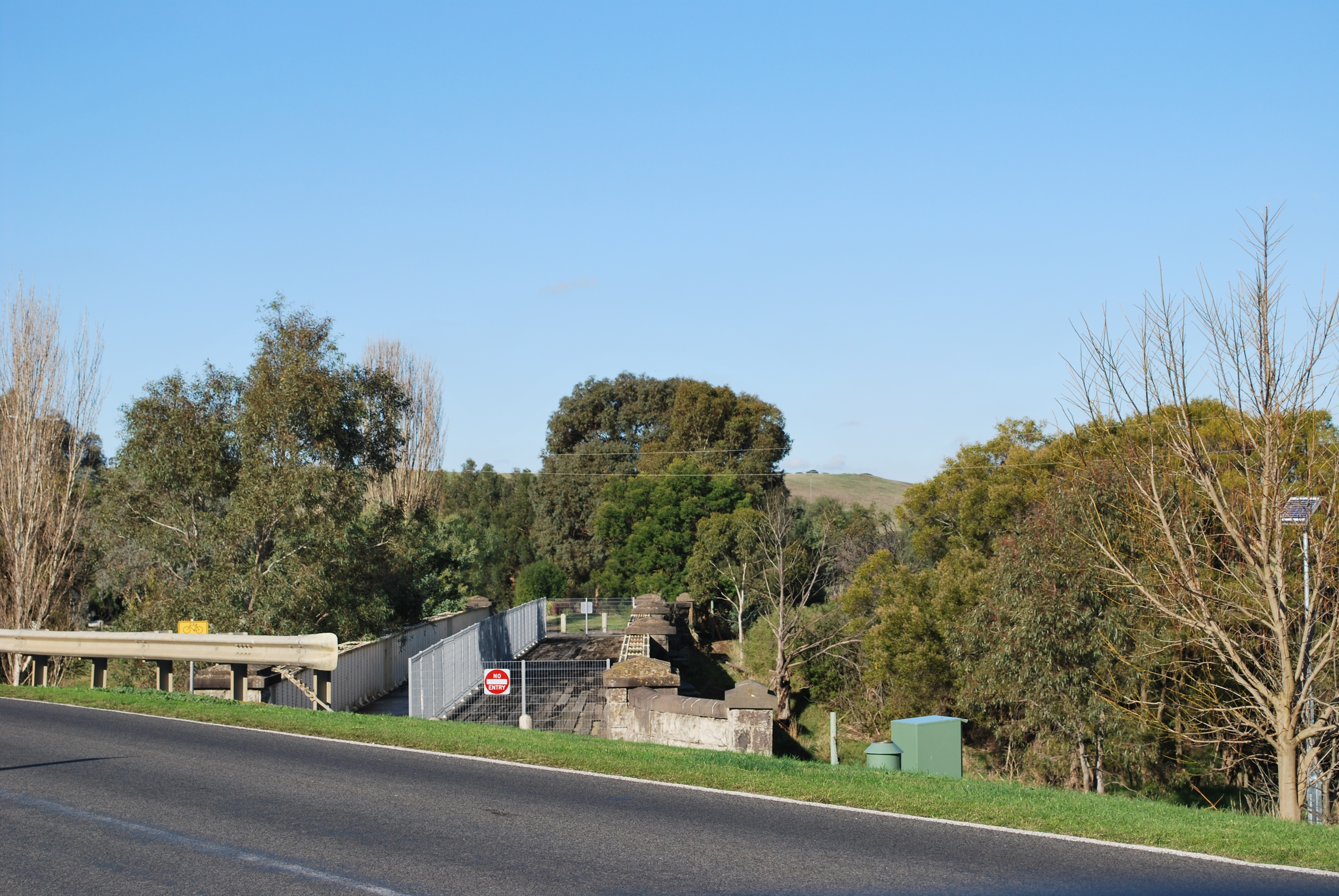
- Coordinates: 38.014009°S 143.977054°E
- Carries: [C143] Shelford-Bannockburn Road
- Crosses: Leigh River (Victoria)
- Locale: Shelford, Victoria, Australia

Characteristics
- Design: Wrought Iron box girder
- Total length: 60 metres (196 ft 10 in)
- Width: 14.3 metres (46 ft 11 in)
- Longest span: 19 metres (62 ft 4 in)

History
- Opened: 1874

Location
- Interactive map of Shelford bridge

The Shelford Bridge is an important early wrought iron box girder road bridge built in 1873-4 over the River Leigh and designed by Charles Anthony Corbett Wilson (1827–1923) on the main road from Melbourne to Portland in Victoria, Australia.

The crossing of the Leigh (or Yarrowee) River may lay claim to the first bridge built in Victoria, when a timber structure was erected in 1840. This was replaced in 1851 with a more substantial bridge on bluestone abutments and piers, and in turn the present iron bridge.

The bridge stands on bluestone abutments and piers and has two half-through, wrought iron, box girders continuous over three spans, supporting a riveted wrought iron frame deck. Ironwork was imported from Liverpool via Geelong on the ship British Empire.

The spans sit on roller bearings and the ironwork was fabricated on site from components made by the Ballarat ironworks of John Price. It is one of only a handful of bridges of this type in Australia, although there are a number of important European examples such as Brunel's Britannia Bridge.

The 1874 bridge replaced an earlier structure from 1851, which evidently reused the bluestone abutments. CAC Wilson was responsible for a number of early bridges in the Leigh and surrounding shires in his 64 years of practice (1846-1910).

The bridge is included on the Victorian Heritage Register, and was saved from demolition when local Country Roads Board engineer Peter Alsop convinced his superiors that a new bridge on a better road alignment was a preferable solution.
