= Peter Paul Labertouche =

British engineer and public servant

- Born: 1 November 1829; Dublin, Ireland
- Died: 1907 (aged 77–78); Kensington, London
- Engineering career
- Discipline: public servant

Peter Paul Labertouche (1829–1907), was a British engineer and public servant, who spent most of his working life in Melbourne, Australia in the roads and railway department of the Government of Victoria. He was descended from the Huguenots of County Wexford; Scales family of Kerry and Cadden of Galway.

Labertouche was educated at Trinity College, Dublin, Ireland, obtaining a Bachelor of Arts (B.A.). He arrived in Melbourne, Victoria, Australia, at the age of 22 aboard the ship Formosa as an unassisted passenger in October 1852. On 4 April 1853, he was appointed Clerk of the Central Road Board [Victoria] and in 1856 he was living in Lyndurst, Victoria on a government salary of £100 a year. in 1859 he married Eleanor Annie Scales at Christchurch, Christchurch City, Canterbury, New Zealand. Around the same time he also owned freehold land in Elsternwick.

He moved to the Department of Roads and Bridges [Victoria] in 1860 becoming Secretary, when the Central Roads board was disbanded. From 1872 to 1876 he was Chief Clerk of the Victorian Railways, and then from 1876 to 1892 as Secretary. He was one of hundreds of Public Servants who were dismissed on Black Wednesday in 1878, as part of the struggle between the Berry government and the Legislative Assembly. He had an arm amputated as a result of a shooting accident when he was in the roads and bridges department.

In 1892 he returned to London where he lived out his retirement in Kensington. Labertouche Creek and Labertouche Cave in Gippsland, and the town of Labertouche near Drouin in Victoria are named after him.
