= List of acts of the Legislative Council of Victoria from 1853 =

This is a list of acts of the Legislative Council of Victoria, Australia for the year 1853.

== 1853 ==
Short title, or popular name	Citation	Royal assent
Long title
	16 Vict. No. 24	8 January 1853
An Act for the Regulation of the Police Force. (Repealed by Police Regulation Statute 1865 (28 Vict. No. 257))
Victoria Steam Navigation Act 1853 (repealed)	16 Vict. No. 25	8 January 1853
An Act to consolidate and amend the Laws relating to Steam Navigation and to the Boats and Lights to be carried and the Signals to be made by Sea-going Vessels. (Repealed by Passengers Harbors and Navigation Statute 1865 (28 Vict. No. 255))
Registration of Births Deaths and Marriages Act 1853 (repealed)	16 Vict. No. 26	18 January 1853
An Act for Registering Births, Deaths, and Marriages in the Colony of Victoria. (Repealed by Registration of Births Deaths and Marriages Statute 1864 (27 Vict. No. 218))
	16 Vict. No. 27	18 January 1853 (Note: This act was reserved for approval by Her Majesty.)
An Act to amend an Act intituled "An Act to regulate the Licensing of Auctioneers and the collection of Duties on Property sold by Auction." (Note: 11 Vict. No. 16 (NSW)) (Repealed by 18 Vict. No. 23)
	16 Vict. No. 28	18 January 1853
An Act more effectually to promote the erection of Buildings for Public Worship and to provide for the maintenance of Ministers of Religion in the Colony of Victoria. (Repealed by Religious Trusts Statute 1865 (28 Vict. No. 244))
	16 Vict. No. 29	19 January 1953
An Act to alter "The Victoria Electoral Act of 1851," (Note: Victoria Electoral Act 1851 (14 Vict. No. 47 (NSW))) and to increase the number of Members of the Legislative Council of the Colony of Victoria. (Repealed by 19 Vict. No. 12)
	16 Vict. No. 30	20 January 1853
An Act for applying certain Sums arising from the Revenue receivable in the Colony of Victoria to the Service thereof, for the year one thousand eight hundred and fifty-three, and for further appropriating the said Revenue.
	16 Vict. No. 31	22 January 1853
An Act to enable the Sheriff of the Colony of Victoria to appoint Deputies. (Repealed by Supreme Court Act 1890 (54 Vict. No. 1142))
	16 Vict. No. 32	22 January 1853
An Act to make provision for the better controul and disposal of Offenders. (Repealed by Statute of Gaols 1864 (27 Vict. No. 219))
	16 Vict. No. 33	22 January 1853
An Act to abolish certain Dues on Shipping and to amend the Law relating to Seamen and Water Police. (Repealed by Seamen Statute 1865 (28 Vict. No. 245))
University Act 1853 (repealed)	16 Vict. No. 34	22 January 1853
An Act to incorporate and endow the University of Melbourne. (Repealed by University Act 1890 (54 Vict. No. 1151))
	16 Vict. No. 35	28 January 1853
An Act to make provision for the Sale of Fermented and Spirituous Liquors and of Refreshments in certain Districts. (Repealed by Wines Beer and Spirit Sale Statute 1864 (27 Vict. No. 227))
	16 Vict. No. 36	28 January 1853
An Act to amend an Act, intituled "An Act for regulating the Police in the Towns of Parramatta, Windsor, Maitland, Bathurst, and other Towns respectively, and for removing and preventing Nuisances and Obstructions, and for the better alignment of Streets therein." (Note: 2 Vict. No. 2 (NSW)) (Repealed by 18 Vict. No. 14)
Savings' Bank Act 1853 (repealed)	16 Vict. No. 37	7 February 1853
An Act to consolidate and amend the Laws relating to Savings' Banks. (Repealed by Savings Banks Statute 1865 (28 Vict. No. 263))
Melbourne Corporation Act Amendment Act 1853	16 Vict. No. 38	7 February 1853
An Act to amend in certain respects An Act intituled, "An Act to incorporate the inhabitants of the Town of Melbourne," (Note: Melbourne Corporation Act 1842 (6 Vict. No. 7 (NSW))) and to make further provision for the cleansing and improvement of the City of Melbourne.
Melbourne Sewerage and Water Act 1853 (repealed)	16 Vict. No. 39	8 February 1853
An Act to Establish a Board of Commissioners for the better Sewerage and Drainage of the City of Melbourne and for Supplying Water thereto and to the Suburbs thereof. (Repealed by Public Works Statute 1865 (29 Vict. No. 289))
Roads Act 1853 (repealed)	16 Vict. No. 40	8 February 1853
An Act for making and improving Roads in the Colony of Victoria. (Repealed by Public Works Statute 1865 (29 Vict. No. 289))
	16 Vict. No. 41	6 January 1853
An Act to alter and increase the Sum appropriated to the payment of the Salary of the Governor of the Colony of Victoria. (Repealed by 18 Vict. No. 43)
Bank of New South Wales Act 1853 or the Bank of New South Wales Act Amendment Act 1853 (repealed)	16 Vict.	30 November 1852
An Act to amend an Act intituled "An Act to incorporate the Proprietors of a certain Banking Company called the Bank of New South Wales, and for other purposes therein mentioned." (Note: Bank of New South Wales Act 1850 (14 Vict. (NSW))) (Repealed by Bank of New South Wales Act 1855 (18 Vict.))
City of Melbourne Gas and Coke Company's Act 1853	16 Vict.	12 January 1853
An Act for Lighting with Gas the City of Melbourne in the Colony of Victoria and to enable certain persons associated under the name style or title of "The City of Melbourne Gas and Coke Company" to sue and be sued in the name of the Secretary for the time being of the said Company and for other purposes therein mentioned.
	16 Vict.	20 January 1853
An Act to incorporate a Company to be called "The Melbourne and Hobson's Bay Railway Company." (Repealed by 42 Vict. No. 817)
Melbourne, Mount Alexander, and Murray River Railway Company Act 1853 (repealed)	16 Vict.	8 February 1853
An Act to Incorporate a Company to be called "The Melbourne, Mount Alexander, and Murray River Railway Company." (Repealed by Public Works Statute 1865 (29 Vict. No. 289))
Geelong and Melbourne Railway Company Act 1853 (repealed)	16 Vict.	8 February 1853
An Act to incorporate a Company, to be called "The Geelong and Melbourne Railway Company." (Repealed by Public Works Statute 1865 (29 Vict. No. 289))
	17 Vict. No. 1	14 September 1853
An Act to alter an Act intituled "An Act to restrain by summary proceedings unauthorized Mining on Waste Lands of the Crown." (Note: 15 Vict. No. 15) (Repealed by 17 Vict. No. 4)
	17 Vict. No. 2	11 October 1853
An Act for the further extension of Summary Jurisdiction in cases of Larceny. (Repealed by Criminal Law and Practice Statute 1864 (27 Vict. No. 233))
	17 Vict.	11 October 1853
An Act to amend the Law relating to Offenders illegally at large.
	17 Vict. No. 3	27 October 1853
An Act to regulate the tenure of Office by the Aldermen of additional Wards in the City of Melbourne. (Repealed by 27 Vict. No. 178)
Goldfields Act 1853 (repealed)	17 Vict. No. 4	1 December 1853
An Act for the better management of the Gold Fields in the Colony of Victoria. (Repealed by 18 Vict. No. 37)
	17 Vict. No. 5	21 December 1853
An Act to legalize partnerships with limited liability. (Repealed by Companies Statute 1864 (27 Vict. No. 190))

== Sources ==
- "1853 Victorian Historical Acts". AustLII.
