= Martin Lake (Martin County, Minnesota) =

Lake in the state of Minnesota, United States

- Location within Minnesota
- Location: Martin County, Minnesota
- Coordinates: 43°44′57″N 94°27′58″W
- Type: lake

Martin Lake is a lake in Martin County, in the U.S. state of Minnesota.

Martin Lake was named for early settler Henry Martin, as was Martin County.

== See also ==
- List of lakes in Minnesota
