= Charles Corbett Powell Wilson =

Wilson, Charles Corbett Powell
- Born: c. 1857; Geelong
- Died: c. 1938; Ballarat, Victoria, Australia
- Parent(s): Charles Anthony Corbett Wilson, nee Powell
- Engineering career
- Discipline: civil engineer

Charles Corbett Powell Wilson was a Victorian engineer and public servant, responsible for construction and Maintenance of bridges in Western Region of Victoria, Australia. He was the eldest son of Charles Anthony Corbett Wilson, also a prominent engineer in Victoria.

Wilson was Portland Shire engineer around 1901, and took over as shire engineer of the Leigh and Buninyong Shires on his father's retirement in about 1903. He was shire engineer at Buninyong in 1923 and was active in Ballarat until at least 1937.

Elected as president of the Institute of Local Government Engineers of Australasia 25 October 1922

He was married to Edith Jane Lynd, second daughter of Sydney Rudge Robinson, Esq. MRCSL, LAC, on 4 April 1884, at Christ Church, Geelong, by the Rev Canon Goodman.
