= Iris Woolcock =

American artist/photographer/writer

- Born: February 3, 1896; Wisconsin, U.S.
- Died: July 21, 1979 (aged 83); Sarasota, Florida, U.S.
- Known for: Artist, photographer, writer
- Spouse: Charles Morrow Wilson (divorced 1939)

Iris Woolcock (February 3, 1896 in Wisconsin – July 21, 1979 in Sarasota, Florida) was an American artist, photographer, and writer. She traveled with husband Charles Morrow Wilson, a freelance writer, and made photographs and drawings illustrating his books and articles. Woolcock wrote her own book about driving to Alaska in 1947; it was published after her death.

Woolcock was born in Wisconsin, and spent summers in Enterprise, Wisconsin with her parents. In 1933, she married Charles Morrow Wilson. They lived in Putney, Vermont until their divorce in 1939. Woolcock traveled with Wilson, both in the U.S. and Central America, and contributed to his magazine articles and books with photographs and drawings that she produced. The New York Times said of her work in Central America: Challenge and Opportunity, "Iris Woolcock's photographs ... are quite as beckoning as if this were a travel book."

In 1948, Woolcock bought a Liberty trailer in Bremen, Indiana and drove to Fairbanks, Alaska on the Alaska Highway that had opened in 1942. She wrote about her experience in a book titled The Road North: One Woman's Adventure Driving the Alaska Highway 1947-1948. The book was published in 1990, approximately ten years after her death in 1979.
