= Lake Barracoota =

Lake in Victoria, Australia

- Lake Barracuta, Barracoota Lake
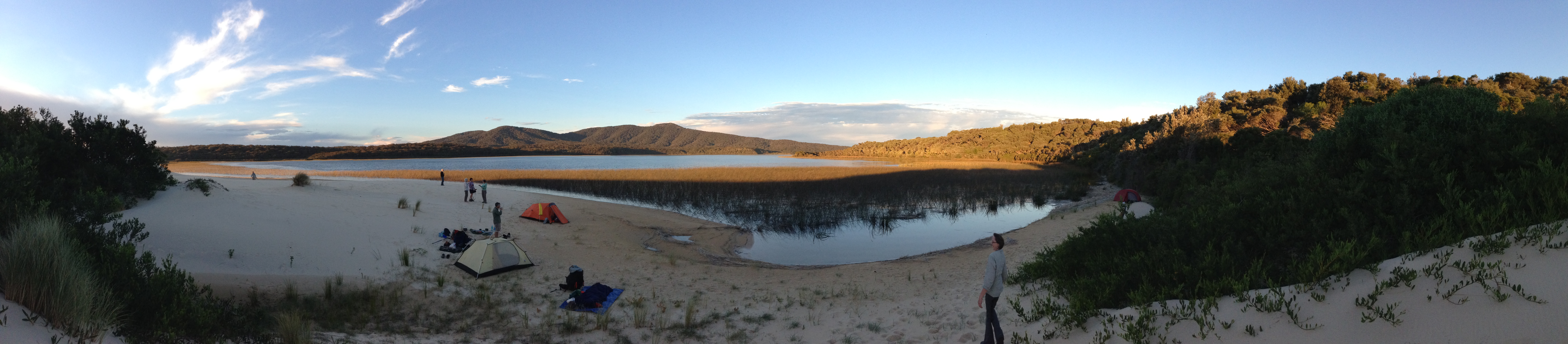
- Lake Barracoota

- Location in Victoria
- Location: East Gippsland, Victoria
- Coordinates: 37°31′58″S 149°51′52″E
- Type: Freshwater
- Basin countries: Australia
- Managing agency: Parks Victoria
- Surface area: 240 hectares (590 acres)

Lake Barracoota is a naturally forming permanent freshwater lake in the East Gippsland region in the Australian state of Victoria. The lake is located entirely within the Croajingolong National Park and when full, the surface area of the lake is 240 hectares (590 acres).

The eastern shoreline of the lake lie against a granite spur of the Howe Range but all other shorelines are backed by dune sand or swamp deposits. Beaches at the eastern and western shores and spits along the southern shore are formed from sand blown into the lake from coastal dunes and which is being moved by wave and wave currents. Sand is spilling into the lake from active parabolic dunes at two points along the southern shore. Other lake shorelines are fringed by Baumea rubiginosa, Eleocharis sphacelata and Trigloching procera, with Phragmites australis at points of fresh water inflow. Behind the reeds and sedges are extensive thickets.

== See also ==
- Croajingolong National Park
- Mallacoota
