= Charles Wilson (cricketer) =

Australian cricketer (1869–1952)

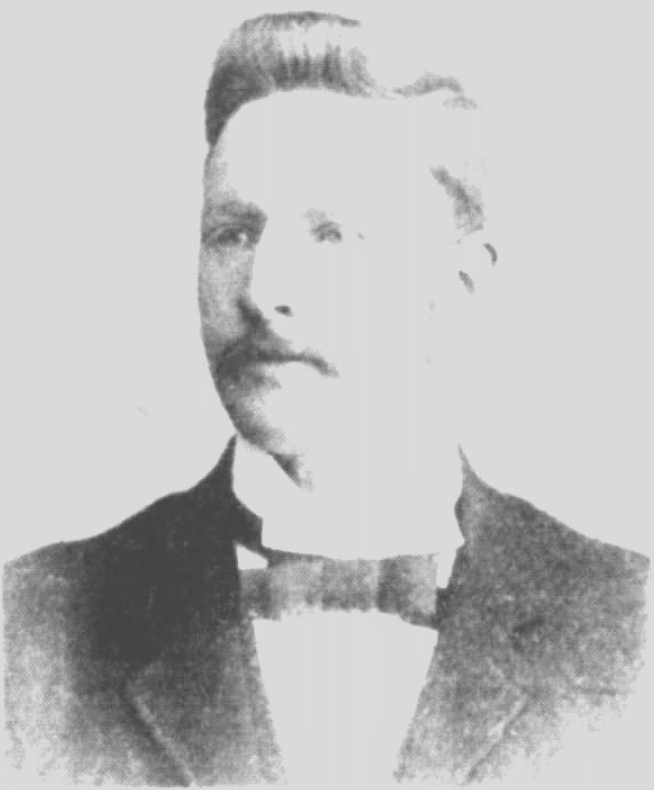

Personal information
- Full name: Charles Geldart Wilson
- Born: 9 January 1869; Carngham, Australia
- Died: 28 June 1952 (aged 83); Wellington, New Zealand
- Nickname: Gillie
- Batting: Right-handed
- Role: Batsman

Domestic team information
- Years: Team
- 1894/95–1897/98: Victoria
- 1905/06–1911/12: Otago
- 1912/13–1919/20: Wellington

Career statistics
Competition	First-class
Matches	32
Runs scored	1,490
Batting average	25.68
100s/50s	3/3
Top score	188
Catches/stumpings	14/–
- Source: CricketArchive, 8 October 2022

Charles Geldart "Gillie" Wilson (9 January 1869 – 28 June 1952) was an Australian first-class cricketer who represented Victoria and played with Otago and Wellington in New Zealand. He also played Australian rules football for St Kilda in the early Victorian Football League (VFL).

The first part of Wilson's sporting career took place in Victoria. Recruited from suburban Melbourne-based team Hawksburn, Wilson debuted for St Kilda in 1887, when they were competing in the Victorian Football Association (VFA). Wilson played two senior VFL games, the first came in the inaugural season in 1897 against Geelong at Corio Oval and the other at Junction Oval in 1900 against Melbourne. He later served as a club secretary. While a St Kilda player he made three first-class cricket appearances for his state, as a right-handed batsman, all in the 1890s against Tasmania.

Wilson moved to New Zealand in 1902 after his football career finished, and became manager of the Invercargill branch of Sargood, Son and Ewen, a New Zealand warehousing and manufacturing company. He made his first-class debut in New Zealand when he took the field for the South Island against Lord Hawke's XI at Dunedin in 1902–03. He was the first player to score a century for Southland, which he did against Otago in 1903–04 with 117 not out. He was transferred in his work to Dunedin in 1905, and from 1905 to 1912 he represented Otago in the Plunket Shield and other first-class cricket fixtures, captaining the team most of the time and serving on the Otago cricket Association executive from 1907 to 1912. He then moved to Wellington where he played for the province until his retirement in 1920.

He had his best summer in 1908–09, when he scored 429 first-class runs at 71.50 with two hundreds. One of those hundreds was an innings of 188 against Hawke's Bay, where he was captain and opened the batting. He followed it up with 49 in the second innings.

He was married in Windsor, Melbourne, in May 1892.
