= Wadawurrung language =

Australian language of Victoria, Australia

Wathawurrung
- Wathaurong
- Native to: Australia
- Region: Victoria
- Ethnicity: Wathaurong people
- Extinct: (date missing)
- Revival: 1998
- Language family: Pama–Nyungan: Kulinic; Kulin; Wathawurrung

Language codes
- ISO 639-3: wth
- Glottolog: wath1238
- AIATSIS: S29
- ELP: Wathawurrung
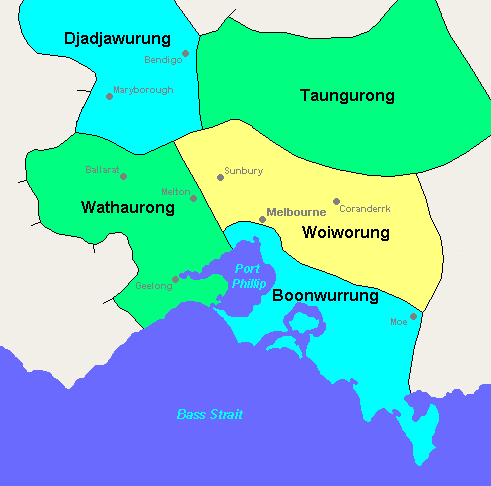
- The five Kulin nations. Wadawurrung ('Wathaurong') is in on the coast in green.

- Location of Wadawurrung Country in Victoria

Wadawurrung (/wʌdəwʌrʌŋ/, WUH-də-wuh-rung), also rendered as Wathawurrung, Wathaurong or Wada wurrung, and formerly sometimes Barrabool, is the Aboriginal Australian language spoken by the Wadawurrung people of the Kulin Nation of Central Victoria. It was spoken by 15 clans south of the Werribee River and the Bellarine Peninsula to Streatham. Various regional programs and initiatives promote the usage and revitalisation of Wadawurrung language.

== Phonology ==
=== Consonants ===
Blake reconstructs Wadawurrung consonants as such:

| | Labial | Alveolar | Laminal | Retroflex | Velar |
|---|---|---|---|---|---|
| Stops | p/b [p] | t/d [t] | th/dh [t̪] tj/dj [c] | rt/rd [ʈ] | k/g [k] |
| Nasals | m [m] | n [n] | nh/ny [n̪, ɲ] | rn [ɳ] | ng [ŋ] |
| Laterals | | l [l] | ly [ʎ̟] | rl [ɭ] | |
| Rhotics | | rr [ɾ / r] | | r [ɽ] | |
| Glides | | | y [j] | | w [w] |

Due to the varied nature of attestations of the language, Blake reconstructs Wadawurrung consonants in complacence to the standard features of the Australian Languages.

It is presumed that Wadawurrung did not distinguish between voiced and unvoiced consonants ('Parrwong ~ Barwon' – Magpie).

What Blake attributes as a distinction between 'alveolar' and 'laminal' consonants is better described as a distinction between dental and post-alveolar pronunciation on nasal and stop consonants. This is a distinction in indigenous language families of the Australian south-east such as Yuin-Kuric (incl. Ngunnawal and Dharug) and the Gippsland languages (Incl. Dhudhuroa).

It is presumed there was no distinction between post-alveolar /n/ and palatal /ɲ/ ('Nhita' – to steal, fluctuates with 'nyita'). It is assumed that a similar correspondence occurs with the post-alveolar stop, thus mixed attestation between 'th', 'tj' & 'ty'.

The post-alveolar consonants /ʎ̟/, /t/ and /ɲ/ in word final position are rendered as 'yl', 'yt' & 'yn', respectively. E.g. 'Gowayn' – Eel. The word final nasal after /a/ is always cited as 'ayn' due to its fluctuation with 'ng' in sources

Blake asserts that sources do not differentiate between alveolar /r/ and retroflex /ɽ/ and the distinction is thus presumed from comparison to other Victorian Aboriginal Languages. Blake represents every rhotic as 'rr' unless drawing from modern sources such as Hercus.

=== Vowels ===
Blake does not specify the number of vowels present in Wadawurrung. The standard set of /a/, /e/, /i/, /o/ and /u/ are used, however Blake notes a consistent correspondence between 'a', 'u' and 'o' in various sources ('Djinang' – foot, variously attested as 'jinnung', 'genong'). There is also fluctuation between 'a' and 'e' as the last vowel in a word ('walart' – possum, compared to 'wollert'), however Blake maintains that they are distinct vowels

== Vocabulary ==
=== Place names ===
Select placenames with attested origin in Wathawurrung language terms are:

| Placename | Origin |
|---|---|
| Barrabool | Unclear, variously reported as "oyster", "slope down to water" or "rounded hill". |
| Barwon | From Barrwang meaning "Magpie", same origin as the town of Parwan. |
| Bungaree | Meaning "hut" or "tent". |
| Buninyong | From Buninyouang, recorded by early colonists as meaning "Man lying on back with raised knee", in reference to the profile of Mount Buninyong. |
| Connewarre | From koonoowarra, meaning black swan. Same origin as the town of Koonwarra in South Gippsland. |
| Corio | Possibly "Sandy cliffs", other sources state "small marsupial" or "wallaby". |
| Geelong | From Djillong, City of Greater Geelong maintains it means "Land" or "Cliffs", other sources suggest it was the original name of Corio Bay. |
| Gheringhap | Either from "gheran" as meaning "timber", then followed by a placename suffix "-hap", or a reference to the black wattle tree. |
| Gnarwarre | Said to be from the name of a local wetland and its waterfowl, possibly same origin as Lake Connewarre from kunuwarra for the black swan. |
| Jan Juc | Either "milk" or "ironbark". |
| Koorweinguboora | Either "where the crane eats frogs" or "land of many waters". |
| Modewarre | The musk duck. |
| Moolap | A meeting place for gathering shellfish. |
| Moorabool | Either from a word for "ghost" or the name for the curlew. |
| Moriac | Meaning "hill". |
| Myrniong | The native yam-daisy, also spelled Murnong. |
| Parwan | From Barrwang meaning "Magpie", same origin as that of the Barwon River. |
| Tarneit | From the Wathaurong word for the colour white. |
| Wendouree | from wendaaree (the Wathawurrong word meaning go away). When settler William Cross Yuille asked a local indigenous woman what the name of the lake was, she told him to go away. hence the name |
| Werribee | From Wirribi-yaluk, the name of the Werribee River, with Wirribi said to mean "spine" or "backbone". |
| Wingeel | From the word for the wedge-tailed eagle and creator spirit. Compare spelling Bunjil from other Kulin languages |
| Woady Yaloak River | From Wurdi-yaluk meaning "big creek". |
| You Yangs | Reportedly Ude Youang, meaning "big mountains". |

=== Animal Names ===
Wadawurrung vocabulary pertaining to local wildlife:

- 'Djirnap' – Cockatoo
- 'Duwan' – Brush-tailed phascogale, tuan.
- 'Goim', 'Kuyim' – Kangaroo
- 'Ngurr-ngurr' – Wombat, Vombatus ursinus
- 'Ngambulmum' – Koala, lit. 'bottom of a tree fork'
- 'Mon.garrk', 'Mon.ngarrk' – Echidna
- 'Perridak' – Platypus
- 'Walart' – Possum. The term 'Walart-walart' refers to a possum skin cloak (Blake also lists 'Barnong' as a word pertaining to the Ringtail Possum specifically)
