= Charles Byron Wilson =

American neurosurgeon (1929–2018)

- Born: Charles Byron Wilson; August 31, 1929; Neosho, Missouri, United States
- Died: February 24, 2018 (aged 88)
- Occupations: Surgeon; Neurosurgeon
- Spouse: Frances Petrocelli (before 2018)
- Children: Rebecca Cohn; Byron Wilson; Robert "Craig" Wilson

Charles Byron Wilson (August 31, 1929 – February 24, 2018) was an American neurosurgeon.

== Education ==
When Wilson's college football career was cut short due to an ankle injury, he studied medicine, finishing first in his class in 1954. He served a rotating internship and a year in pathology at Charity Hospital, where he was drawn to the studies of neuropathology, neurology and neuroanatomy, and decided to become a neurosurgeon.

== Career ==
Wilson joined the faculty of Louisiana State University Medical School, where he was assistant professor of neurosurgery from 1961 to 1963.

Moving to Lexington, he founded the Division of Neurosurgery at the University of Kentucky. There he became interested in malignant gliomas and created specialized laboratory and research programs.

He was named professor and chairman of the Division of Neurosurgery at the University of California, San Francisco in 1968. According to Dr. Susan Chang, director of UCSF's neuro-oncology division, “[Wilson] was a visionary in how he built a multidisciplinary approach to studying brain cancer, linking basic science and clinical research together. He was able to set up an infrastructure to test new therapies on tumors and spare patients the side effects of treatments.”

In 1985 Wilson became Tong-Po Kan Professor of Neurosurgery.

He was profiled by Malcolm Gladwell for The New Yorker in 1999, where Gladwell argued that Wilson was an example of “physical genius,” and compared him to such figures as Wayne Gretsky, Yo-Yo Ma and Tony Gwynn.

Wilson performed over 2,000 transsphenoidal surgeries.

After his death, a New York Times articled described him as “a pioneering and virtuosic San Francisco neurosurgeon who used operating rooms like stages, sometimes performing as many as eight surgeries a day, all while building a leading brain tumor research center.”

== Accomplishments and awards ==
Wilson received the Outstanding Clinical Instructor and Outstanding Clinical Professor awards at Kentucky. He was the Wilder Penfield Lecturer, the Herbert Olivecrona Lecturer, and the R. Eustace Semmes Lecturer, among others. He published over 500 articles and book chapters and served on several editorial boards, including that of The Journal of Neurosurgery, which he chaired from 1981 to 1983.

== Miscellany ==
Wilson was a pianist, and enjoyed running marathons.

He co-founded the Global AIDS Interfaith Alliance, which provides healthcare programs in African countries affected by AIDS, tuberculosis and malaria.

He raised money and determined policy for Clinic by the Bay, which offers free medical services to uninsured people in the San Francisco area.

Wilson is survived by his fifth wife, Frances Petrocelli; his daughter, Rebecca Cohn; his son, Byron; a stepdaughter, Kathryn Petrocelli; four grandchildren, and two step-grandchildren.
