= BLKBOK =

21st-century American pianist and composer

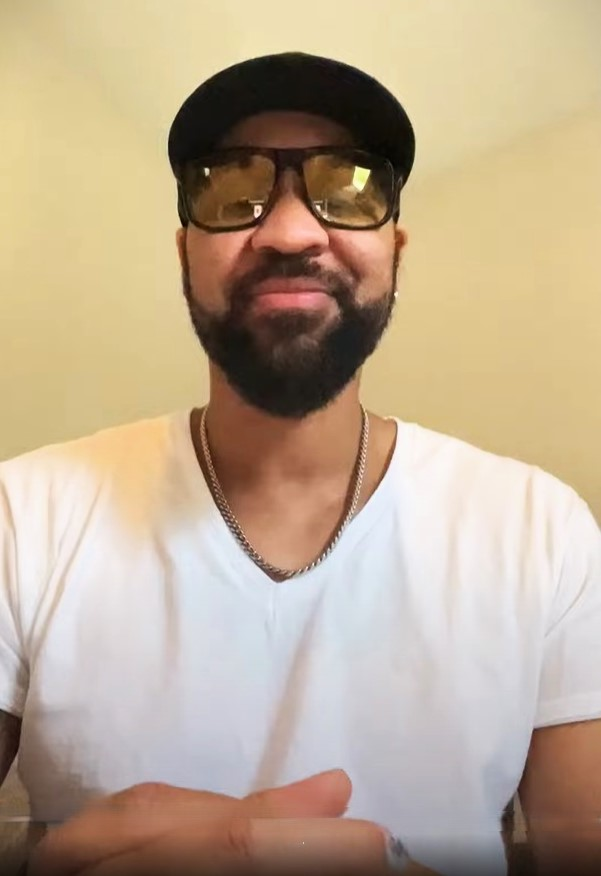
- BLKBOK in 2024

Background information
- Born: Detroit
- Genres: Classical, crossover
- Occupations: Pianist, composer
- Instrument: Piano
- Website: www.blkbok.com

Charles Wilson III, known professionally as BLKBOK, is an American pianist and composer. His stage name is a stylization of "Black Bach".

== Early years ==
Born in Detroit, BLKBOK grew up on the city's west side and attended Ann Arbor Trail Middle School. He attended Cass Tech High School for two years and then attended the Detroit School of Arts. He displayed musical talent at an early age and began studying piano at age six. He studied for several years with piano instructor Toma Schwartz of Lathrup Village, Michigan. By age eight, he was an acclaimed prodigy and won college-level competitions. He trained for over 10 years in classical piano and has been described as a "genre-bending pianist".

== Career ==
After high school, BLKBOK moved to Florida where he attended Full Sail University. He gained acclaim for his talent as a pianist and toured with Justin Timberlake, Rihanna, John Mayer, Demi Lovato, and the Backstreet Boys. He also worked as a studio musician with Timbaland and played in the Cirque du Soleil production of Michael Jackson: One.

BLKBOK began his individual recording career with an EP titled CVRART, which contained "classically infused renditions" of popular music by Drake, Cardi B, and others.

BLKBOK adopted his stage name during the COVID-19 pandemic while working on his first album. The album, Black Book, was released in June 2021. The album was well reviewed and was featured at the first Juneteenth Foundation Freedom Concert in Washington, D.C.

In 2022, BLKBOK collaborated with astronaut Michael López Alegría to perform his song "Stars (Ad Astra)" in the first ever piano duet between an astronaut in space and a musician on earth. The performance, which was, in their words, intended to "encourage a dialogue about music and education in general, and to highlight the importance of STEAM as an educational discipline," was followed by BLKBOK's performance of a rendition of Elton John's "Rocket Man" in dedication to López Alegría.

BLKBOK's second album, 9, was released in 2023. Its title is a reference to the Little Rock Nine. The album includes spoken-word contributions from Felicia Thomas. The work has been described as "a fresh spin on classical music" that "offers some lessons of hope and love for our troubled world".

He has composed and performed classical piano music about Michelle Obama, the murder of George Floyd, the Little Rock Nine, The Negro Motorist Green Book, and other aspects of black American history. He cites as his influences artists as varied as Mozart and Mos Def.
