= John Gibson Fleming =

Scottish Surgeon and Medical Administrator (1809-1879)

John Gibson Fleming FRSE PFPSG (1809–1879) was a Scottish surgeon, medical administrator and President of the Royal College of Physicians and Surgeons of Glasgow 1865 to 1868, and 1870 to 1872.

== Life ==
He was born in Glasgow on 2 December 1809.

He studied at Glasgow High School then Glasgow University, also spending some time in Paris and Italy studying anatomy and surgery receiving his doctorate (MD) in 1830.

He returned to work in Glasgow (for all his life) first in more parochial roles and then in the Glasgow Royal Infirmary, having survived a serious attack of typhoid fever contracted in the former role. He was manager of the Glasgow Royal Infirmary from 1850. From 1839 to 1878 he also served as Surgeon to the Gartnavel Royal Hospital.

In 1872 he was elected a Fellow of the Royal Society of Edinburgh his proposer being Andrew Wood. In 1876 he was co-founder of the Glasgow Royal Infirmary Medical School. He was chief medical advisor to the Scottish Amicable Life Assurance Company.

He died on 2 October 1879 following a relapse of his earlier typhoid fever, at home at 155 Bath Street in Glasgow. He was married with three sons, one of whom, Mr W M J Fleming, lectured in physiology.

== Publications ==
His main publication, Medical Statistics of Life Insurance (1862), still forms the basis of much life insurance assessment.

== Artistic recognition ==
He was posthumously painted by Sir Daniel Macnee based upon a photograph in later life. The painting dates from around 1881 and hangs in the Royal College of Physicians and Surgeons of Glasgow.
