= Charlie Wilson (Burnley footballer) =

English footballer (fl. 1945–1946)

Personal information
- Full name: Charles Wilson
- Height: 5 ft 8 in (1.73 m)
- Position: Wing half

Senior career*
Years	Team	Apps	(Gls)
1945–1946	Burnley	0	(0)
- * Club domestic league appearances and goals

Charles Wilson was a footballer who made one FA Cup appearance for Burnley as a wing half.

== Personal life ==
Wilson served in the Royal Air Force during the Second World War.

== Career statistics ==
Appearances and goals by club, season and competition
Club	Season	League			FA Cup		Total	
Club	Season	Division	Apps	Goals	Apps	Goals	Apps	Goals
Burnley	1945–46	―			1	0	1	0
Career total			0	0	1	0	1	0
