= Charles T. Wilson =

American rubber importer (1879–1974)

- Born: Charles Thomson Wilson; July 25, 1879; Houston, U.S.
- Died: July 27, 1974 (aged 95); New York City
- Occupation(s): Businessman, crude rubber importer

Charles Thomson Wilson (July 25, 1879 – July 27, 1974) was an American businessman and crude rubber importer.

== Biography ==
He was a promoter of commercial and cultural exchange, and rapprochement between the United States and Mexico.

He was a member of the Mexican Chamber of Commerce in New York, of the Mexican Asociación Nacional de Charros, and of the Chapultepec Golf Club (Mexico City). He received the Mexican Order of the Aztec Eagle.

Wilson died in New York City on July 27, 1974.
