= Lake Burrumbeet =

Lake in Victoria, Australia

- Location in Victoria
- Location: West of Ballarat, Victoria
- Coordinates: 37°29′35″S 143°38′13″E
- Type: Eutrophic
- Primary inflows: Burrumbeet Creek, Blind Creek, Bo-Peep Creek
- Primary outflows: Baillies Creek (when full); evaporation
- Catchment area: 228 km^{2} (88 sq mi)
- Basin countries: Australia
- Max. length: 6.6 km (4.1 mi)
- Max. width: 4.7 km (2.9 mi)
- Surface area: 24 km^{2} (9.3 sq mi)
- Average depth: 2 m (6 ft 7 in)
- Max. depth: 2.65 m (8 ft 8 in)
- Water volume: 38,000 ML (8.4×10^{9} imp gal; 1.0×10^{10} US gal)
- Surface elevation: 380 m (1,250 ft)

Lake Burrumbeet is a large but shallow eutrophic lake in central western Victoria, Australia. Located 20 kilometres (12 mi) west of Ballarat and 140 kilometres (87 mi) west of Melbourne, the lake has been progressively emptying since 1997 and was declared completely dry in 2004. However, it refilled in later years because of good rainfalls, making water sports in the lake once again possible, with recreational jet skiing and boating taking place in the winter of 2010. The lake is a major wetland for the region because of its size and is utilised as a recreational area for boating, fishing and camping.

Burrumbeet is the largest of four shallow lakes in the Ballarat region covering approximately 24 square kilometres (9.3 sq mi). The lake reserve is of important historical significance as many Aboriginal camp sites and areas of geological interest are located around its foreshore.

== Physical features and hydrology ==
The lake is a large open water body with a surface area of approximately 24 square kilometres (9.3 sq mi). Burrumbeet Creek is the main input to the lake with some other catchment areas to the north and south. The flow of the creek is supplemented by a release of 2,000 megalitres (440,000,000 imp gal; 530,000,000 US gal) of treated waste water per year from the Ballarat North Treatment Plant. The lake outlet is situated in the south-west shore of the lake and flows into Baillie Creek, which is a tributary of Hopkins River. The outlet is controlled by a series of boards which are raised or lowered depending on water levels. The lake is characterised by a sand and mud bottom with rock outcrops.

Surrounded by grazing land the lake has suffered from a rise in salinity levels due to abnormally dry conditions. This is reflected also by a fall in lake levels. High nutrient levels and algal blooms occur in the lake from time to time. The lake is often discoloured and has seasonal changes in turbidity levels.

== History ==
Before European settlement the area around Lake Burrumbeet was inhabited and frequented by the Burrumbeet balug clan of the Wada wurrung people. The area would have provided a good source of food, particularly short-finned eel. The name Burrumbeet derives from the local aboriginal word burrumbidj meaning 'muddy or dirty water'. Some artifacts and tools have been found on the northern edge of the lake in the past.

European settlement came in 1838 when Thomas Learmonth and his brother took up the Ercildoun squatting run to the north of the lake. William Bramwell Withers recounting in his "History of Ballarat" describes hot days and freezing cold nights, so much so, that the early pioneers camping place, near Burrumbeet, was named Mt Misery. In the next year, 1839, the bed of Lake Burrumbeet was quite dry, and it remained so for several succeeding summers when Mrs Andrew Scott drove across the dry lake bed in 1840. In 1944 it was reported that the lake had again completely dried up.

On 21 October 1965, a Ballarat Aero Club Cessna plunged into the lake with a pilot and three passengers on board. Two people were killed when the plane crashed 1.5 km from shore. The bodies and most of the plane's wreckage were removed from the lake in the days following the crash. With the lake recently being dry the remaining wreckage was only discovered and is believed to have since been souvenired.

== Flora and fauna ==
Burrumbeet is one of the most productive redfin perch waterways in Victoria, with fish to 2.5 kg and is very popular with anglers. Short-finned eel to 1 kilogram (2.2 lb), roach to 350 grams (12 oz), tench to 1.35 kilograms (3.0 lb), goldfish, flat-headed gudgeon, Australian smelt and European carp are found here. The lake is occasionally stocked with rainbow trout when conditions are suitable and at those times, it provides a very good trout fishery. The lake is also fished commercially for short-finned eel. Birdlife such as black swan are common.

There is little vegetation remaining of value around the lake due to the intensive agricultural methods used since settlement. However, there are stands of river red gum near the mouth of Burrumbeet creek estimated to be over 500 years old. The current drought conditions has created an environment suitable for unwanted vegetation to grow on the lake bed, in particular, Agrostis Avenacea, commonly known as fairy grass or tumble weed. When dry, this type of grass produces a seed head that becomes wind blown and can become a nuisance value and a fire hazard due to it gathering in wind drifts.

== See also ==
- Lake Wendouree
- Drought in Australia
