= Charles Anthony Corbett Wilson =

Charles Anthony Corbett Wilson (1827–1923) was an important figure in the history of engineering and bridge building in Victoria, Australia.

Wilson was born at Brompton Square, London, on 13 February 1827. His father was Charles Corbett Wilson, a solicitor of Gray's Inn, London. CAC Wilson was educated by private tutors and at the Western Grammar School, Brompton, and was articled in 1846 to the Westminster area engineering firm of Messrs. Griffin and Downing. He arrived in Victoria, Australia on 10 August 1851 aboard the Troubadour and did gold diggings at Golden Point until he decided that he could not be successful at it. He left Ballarat and practised as a surveyor in Geelong, and subsequently went on to have one of the longest careers of any engineer in Victoria; he was responsible for a number of important engineering works.

In the late 1850s, Wilson carried out the original survey for the Melbourne–Geelong Railway and then joined the Central Road Board as assistant engineer in the Western district, which appointment he held until 1860. He was employed in the construction of the original Iron Barwon Bridge at Geelong, the Shelford Bridge over the River Leigh and the first bridge on the present site at Cressy. He later expressed a debt to the training he received there under Charles Rowand. Wilson practised his profession for sixty-four years (1846–1910, and was Engineer for the Shires of Leigh (1863–1910) and Bannockburn. He was responsible for many iron, timber and concrete bridges in western Victoria. He was succeeded by his eldest son Charles Corbett Powell Wilson as shire engineer on his retirement.

In 1860, he undertook took several large Government survey contracts in the Western district, including Chatsworth, Grassdale and Murndal, Montajup and Dunkeld, and Mount William. In October, 1863, he was appointed secretary, treasurer, and engineer to the Shelford District Road Board which later became the Shire of Leigh, where he stayed until his retirement in October, 1917 - a period of 54 years. He was a member of the Victorian Institute of Engineers and of the Victorian Institute of Surveyors. In 1857 he married a daughter of Connor Powell, an old settler of the Waurn Ponds; of 15 children, 7 sons and three daughters survived him.

It is likely that the advanced truss designs of the McMillans Bridge, and the Pitfield Bridge, indicate the engineering skill of C. A. C. Wilson. These bridges demonstrate Wilson's professional interaction with the University of Melbourne Engineering Department, headed by Professor William Charles Kernot. At the same time that the Sydney University engineering department was more concerned with improving designs of timber bridge, and in particular timber truss bridges using superior Australian eucalypt timbers, Melbourne University's foundation Professor of Engineering took a special interest in the analysis and design of wrought-iron bridges. Wilson paid close attention to these developments and made practical application of the theory. Most of Victoria's municipal engineers in the nineteenth century regarded themselves as 'practical men', and were suspicious of too much theory, so Wilson can be seen as a radical and adventurous municipal engineer who was willing to take advantage of the best engineering theory and testing facilities available. At least two shires in the Western District—Leigh and Bannockburn—were also adventurous enough to give the Shire engineer headway.

Wilson died in Geelong on 7 October 1923.
