= Charlie Wilson (footballer, born 1905) =

English footballer

Personal information
- Date of birth: 20 July 1905
- Place of birth: Heeley, Sheffield, England
- Date of death: 8 April 1985 (aged 79)
- Place of death: Kidderminster, England
- Height: 5 ft 7 in (1.70 m)
- Position: Inside forward

Youth career
- 1919–1920: Hallam
- 1920–1922: West Bromwich Albion (amateur)

Senior career*
Years	Team	Apps	(Gls)
1922–1928	West Bromwich Albion		
1928–1932	Sheffield Wednesday		
1932–1933	Grimsby Town		
1933–1934	Aston Villa		
1934–1935	Coventry City		
1935–1936	Kidderminster Harriers		
1936–1937	Worcester City		
1937–????	Kidderminster Harriers		
- * Club domestic league appearances and goals

Charles Wilson (20 July 1905 – 8 April 1985) was an English footballer who played as an inside forward.

== Biography ==
Wilson was born in Heeley, Sheffield. He joined West Bromwich Albion as an amateur in December 1920 and turned professional two years later. In February 1928 he moved to Sheffield Wednesday for a £3,000 transfer fee. He moved on to Grimsby Town in March 1932, before joining Aston Villa in August 1933. In June 1934 he signed for Coventry City, and remained with the club until a move to Kidderminster Harriers in July 1935. Wilson joined Worcester City in August 1936, before re-joining Kidderminster in May 1937. During the Second World War he appeared as a guest player for Charlton Athletic and Aldershot. After playing for the Kidderminster Police team in 1946, he finally retired from football in 1947. He died in Kidderminster in 1985.
