= Charlie Wilson (footballer, born 1904) =

English footballer

Personal information
- Full name: Charles Henry Wilson
- Date of birth: 10 February 1904
- Place of birth: Cleethorpes, England
- Date of death: 1994 (aged 89–90)
- Height: 5 ft 8 in (1.73 m)
- Position: Full-back

Senior career*
Years	Team	Apps	(Gls)
1922–1923	Cleethorpes Town		
1923–1933	Grimsby Town	273	(2)
1933–1934	Bournemouth & Boscombe Athletic	11	(0)
1934–1935	Grantham		
1935–193?	Peterborough United		
- * Club domestic league appearances and goals

Charles Henry Wilson (10 February 1904 – 1994) was an English professional footballer who played as a full-back.
