= Central Road Board =

The Central Road Board in Victoria, Australia was the colony's first dedicated body for administering the construction of roads and bridges. The board came into being in 1853 when the Victorian Legislative Council passed An Act for making, and improving Roads in the Colony of Victoria, known as the Roads Act 1853 (16 Vict. No. 40). The Central Road Board was abolished by the Road Districts and Shires Act 1863 (26 Vict. No. 176).

== Responsibilities before separation from NSW ==
In September 1836 Captain William Lonsdale was appointed the Police Magistrate of the Port Phillip District. Under him, with the responsibility for roads was the Clerk of Works of the Port Phillip District. Officeholders were Leroux (1837–1838) and Russell who was appointed on 14 March 1838.

Lonsdale was superseded by the appointment of Superintendent Charles LaTrobe on 26 March 1839. On 1 July that year the Superintendent appointed James Rattenbury to the position of Clerk of Works.

Subsequent appointments relevant to roads, bridges and public works Included David Lennox appointed Superintendent of Bridges (1844) and Henry Ginn appointed Clerk of [Public] Works in May 1846. Lennox's responsibilities included superintending roads. He set new high standards in both areas.

Following separation from NSW in 1851, these colonial officials were responsible to Lonsdale, now the Colonial Secretary.

== Central Road Board ==
Following separation, a Legislative Council was established in Victoria.

In November 1851 Henry Miller MLC was appointed the Chair of the Select Committee on Roads and Bridges. Committee members were Dight, Haines, Smith, Westgarth, Snodgrass. The purpose was to report on the present state and how Government funds might best be spent.

The Committee found that the 'roads in the Colony were 'poorly located, badly aligned, inadequately designed, too narrow, encroached upon by buildings and badly constructed'. Road surfaces were inadequate in winter and river crossings were risky. The Committee's work led to the establishment of a central board.

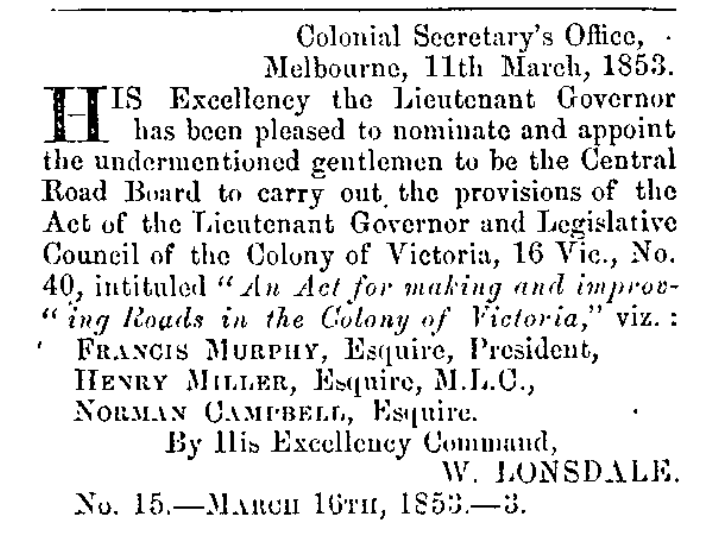
LaTrobe announces his appointees to the Board

In March 1853, the then Lieutenant Governor of Victoria, La Trobe established the Central Road Board. The five members of the Board were appointed by LaTrobe (2) and elected by and from three members of the Legislative Council. Dr Murphy MLC became President of the Board. Other members included Henry Miller and Major Norman Campbell Private Secretary. (Shortly after, LaTrobe appointed Charles Pasley as Colonial Engineer.)

The Board replaced the previous county and parish trusts that existed between 1840 and 1842. One example is the 1841 Warringal or Heidelberg Road Trust in Melbourne. This trust established toll gates on the Great Heidelberg Road between the Merri and Darebin Creeks to pay for the first macadam surfaced road in Victoria.

The purpose of the Central Road Board was to be responsible for the "formation, construction, improvement, management and maintenance of proclaimed main roads and bridges". To achieve this the Board was given authority to raise tolls, and a number of toll houses and ferry tolls were established.

The approach was modelled to some extent on similar authorities established in other colonies such as Alaska, Canada, South Africa, and Central Africa.

Under Peter Paul Labertouche, the Board's first secretary, the Board undertook major road improvements including construction of the Mount Alexander Road and St Kilda Road. "By early 1853 the Board had commenced road making, Macadamising the Sydney Road at Carlton, Mt. Alexander Road at Royal Park, the Richmond Road and St. Kilda Road."

'By the end of 1855 a little less than three years since its start the Board had built 152.2 miles of metalled road, 34.2 miles of formed, drained and partially metalled road, 12.6 miles of formed and drained road, 8.61 miles of cleared road, 164 bridges, 39 fords, 411 culverts, 27 toll houses 12 punts and 5 boats'

To fund, develop and maintain local roads, the 1853 Act established road districts managed by local Boards overseen by the Central Board. These District Road Boards later evolved into shire councils. One example is the Shire of Yackandandah.

== Board of Land & Works ==
The arrival of the railway pushed investment in roads into second place. In 1856, a Department of Railways was established and on 1 January 1858 the Central Road Board was abolished and responsibility for main roads was assumed by the Board of Land and Works. District Road Boards retained the responsibility for local roads.

A dedicated roads agency was not formed again in Victoria until the creation of the Country Roads Board in 1913.

== See also ==
- VicRoads
- Country Roads Board
