= Charles Morrow Wilson =

American writer

- Born: June 16, 1905; Fayetteville, Arkansas, U.S.
- Died: March 1, 1977 (aged 71)

Charles Morrow Wilson (1905–1977) was a writer who also worked at agricultural product firms. He wrote about Liberia, biographies for children, about medicine, and about trade. He was the husband of Iris Woolcock.

Wilson was born in Arkansas and wrote about the state. He graduated from the University of Arkansas in 1926. He also lived for several years in Vermont.

In the 1960s, he transitioned to writing juvenile non-fiction including biographies of Rudolf Diesel and Samuel de Champlain while working as special consultant for the Senate Foreign Relations Committee.

== Bibliography ==
- Aroostook: Our Last Frontier: Maine's Picturesque Inland Empire (1937) published in Brattleboro, Vermont by Stephen Daye Press
- The Landscape of Rural Poverty: Corn Bread and Creek Water (New York: Henry Holt and Company, 1940)
- Middle America (1944)
- New Crops for the New World (1945)
- School of Pan American Agriculture (1946)
- Liberia: Black Africa Microcosm (1947) also apparently published as Liberia 1847 - 1947
- The Tropics; World of Tomorrow (1951)
- One Half the People
- Bodacious Ozarks: True Tales of the Backhills (1959)
- News is Country Grown
- The Monroe Doctrine An American Frame Of Mind
- The Great Turkey Drive (1964)
- Ambassadors In White; The Story Of American Tropical Medicine
- Stars is God's Lanterns: An Offering of Ozark Tellin' Stories (1969)
- Dow Baker and the Great Banana Fleet: The Story of the Yankee Skipper Who Befriended an Island and Introduced Bananas to America (1972)
- Roots: Miracles Below
- Geronimo (1973)
- Green Treasures; Adventures in the Discovery of Edible Plants (1974)
- The Dred Scott Decision (1973)
- Commandant Paul and the founding of Montreal
- Empire in Green and Gold about banana agriculture in Central America
- The commoner: William Jennings Bryan
- Wilderness Explorer: The Story of Samuel de Champlain
