= Charles Robert Wilson =

English academic (1863-1904)

Charles Robert Wilson (1863–1904) was an English academic of the Indian Education Service, known as a historian of British India.

== Life ==
Born at Old Charlton, Kent, on 27 March 1863, was only son of Charles Wilson, army tutor, by his wife Charlotte Woodthorpe Childs. Educated at the City of London School, where he gained the Carpenter scholarship on leaving, he was elected to a scholarship at Wadham College, Oxford, in 1881. He graduated B.A. in 1887, having been placed in the first class in mathematical moderations in 1883 and in the final classical school in 1886. On leaving Oxford he entered the Indian Educational Service in Bengal, being successively professor at Dacca and at the Presidency College, Calcutta, principal of the Bankipur College, Patna, and inspector of schools.

In 1900 Wilson was appointed officer in charge of the records of the government of India, an appointment which carried with it that of assistant secretary in the home department. Soon afterwards his health broke down. He was admitted to the degree of D.Litt. at Oxford in 1902. Dying unmarried at Clapham on 24 July 1904, he was buried in Streatham cemetery.

== Works ==
Wilson researched the early history of the British in Bengal, collating documentary evidence in India, at India Office, in the British Museum, and elsewhere. His published works were:

- List of Inscriptions on Tombs or Monuments in Bengal possessing Historical Interest, Calcutta, 1896.
- Descriptive Catalogue of the Paintings, etc., in the Rooms of the Asiatic Society of Bengal, Calcutta, 1897.
- The Early Annals of the English in Bengal, being the Bengal public consultations for the first half of the eighteenth century, vol. i. 1895; vol. ii. pt. i. 1900, and pt. ii. 1911, posthumous.
- Old Fort William in Bengal, a selection of official documents dealing with its history, 2 vols. 1906, posthumous.

Wilson also wrote articles in the Journal of the Asiatic Society of Bengal, mainly on the Black Hole of Calcutta.

== Notes ==
Attribution

This article incorporates text from a publication now in the public domain: Lee, Sidney, ed. (1912). "Wilson, Charles Robert". Dictionary of National Biography (2nd supplement). Vol. 3. London: Smith, Elder & Co.
