= Lake Corangamite =

Hypersaline lake in Victoria, Australia

- Kronimite
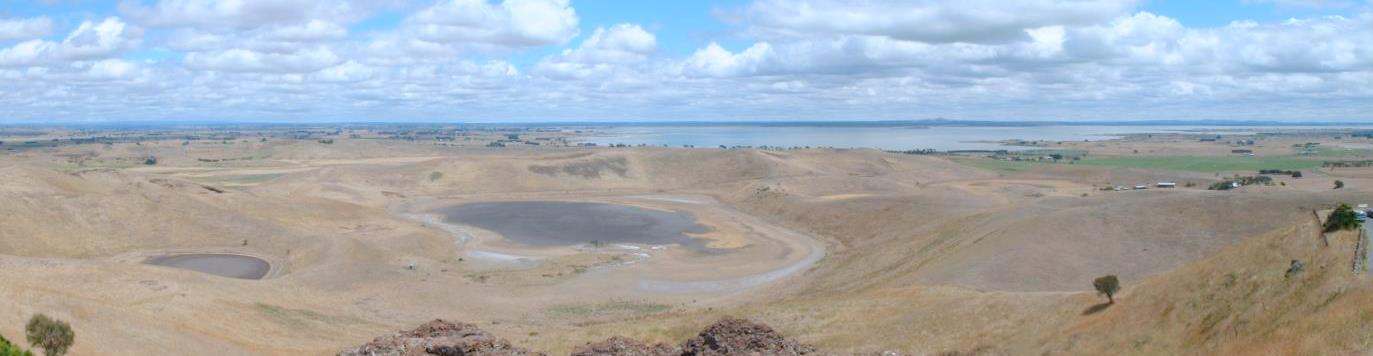
- Shoreline, southwest of Foxhow

- Location in Victoria
- Location: Western District Lakes, Victoria
- Coordinates: 38°10′51″S 143°24′16″E
- Type: Endorheic, hypersaline
- Primary inflows: Pirron Yalloak Creek; Woady Yaloak River; Salt Creek; various springs; 3 m^{3}/s (110 cu ft/s)
- Primary outflows: evaporation
- Catchment area: 4,079 km^{2} (1,575 sq mi)
- Basin countries: Australia
- Max. length: 38 km (24 mi)
- Surface area: 234 km^{2} (90 sq mi)
- Average depth: 5 m (16 ft)
- Max. depth: 7 m (23 ft)
- Shore length^{1}: 150 km (93 mi)
- Islands: Vaughan Island
- ^{1} Shore length is not a well-defined measure.

Lake Corangamite /kəˈræŋɡəmaɪt/, a hypersaline endorheic lake, is located near Colac in the Lakes and Craters region of the Victorian Volcanic Plains of south-west Victoria, Australia. The lake's salinity levels have increased dramatically as the lake level has dropped in recent decades. It is Australia's largest permanent saline lake, covering approximately 230 square kilometres (89 sq mi) with a circumference of 150 kilometres (93 mi). It forms part of the Ramsar-listed Western District Lakes wetland site. The Aboriginal name of the lake is recorded as Kronimite.

== Physical features and hydrology ==
The waterbody is surrounded to the south and east by rocky outcrops (known locally as the stony rises) which were formed by lava flows from Mount Porndon to the south-west and Mount Warrion to the east. The Red Rock volcanic complex overlooks the south east shore at Alvie. The Mount Warrion flows caused the lake to form by blocking drainage to the east.

As is typical of lakes in the area, the eastern flanks of the lake consist of lunettes formed by wind borne sediments blown from the lake during periods with dry climates.

Flow into the lake is extremely variable and negligible in the driest years. Currently it is endorheic (there is no outflow) but during the wet decade of the 1950s the lake flooded and became connected via a series of wetlands and lakes to Lake Murdeduke and the Barwon River. It has never been completely dry since European settlement, and there is evidence it was an open lake for centuries prior to the 1840s when rainfall and runoff were similar to those of the 1950s.

The main inflows are from Pirron Yaloak Creek flowing from the Otway plains to the south, the Woady Yaloak River flowing from the flanks of the Victorian Midlands to the north, and Salt Creek flowing from the plains to the north-west. The Pirron Yaloak has high nutrient loads due to dairy farming in its catchment.

In response to the floods of the 1950s, the Woady Yaloak was diverted away from Lake Corangamite and into the Barwon River. The diversion is managed on the basis of a trigger level for the lake, above which the diversion is enacted. This has not occurred in recent years. Levels have been dropping for decades and it is possible that it will dry completely. In 1980 the salinity was approximately that of seawater and has since risen at least four times that of seawater.

== Fauna ==
=== Fish ===
Aquatic fauna once included fish species such as short-finned eel, common galaxias, flat-headed gudgeon and small-mouth hardyhead. These may still survive in refuges such as Pirron Yaloak creek and various freshwater springs flowing from the stony rises on the south west side of the lake. Springs on the south east side have dried – possibly due to over exploitation of the Warrion Aquifer for irrigation. More recently the fauna included brine shrimp and a species of isopod.

=== Birds ===
In the past the lake has supported internationally significant numbers of banded stilts. The lake was previously an important breeding site for waterbirds. Most recently pelican colonies occurred at Wool Wool rocks and Vaughan Island. However, as water levels have dropped, prey have disappeared and foxes have gained access to the colonies, which have now been abandoned. After receiving substantial grants from the government to undertake conservation works, the owner of Vaugn Island used earth moving equipment to remove habitat such as rocks and remnant vegetation. The lake forms part of the Lake Corangamite Complex Important Bird Area, so identified by BirdLife International because it sometimes supports globally important numbers of waterbirds.

== World War II aircraft ==
A crashed World War II RAAF Wirraway was discovered in June 2005 in Lake Corangamite. Heritage Victoria protects all aircraft crash sites over 50 years old as historic archaeological sites, and the RAAF was briefed on the find. The site was recently exposed by receding water levels in the lake and reported by Parks Victoria officers to Heritage Victoria. The site appears intact and remains mostly submerged. The plane is believed to be Wirraway A20-406 (incorrectly attributed to A20-405 in some accounts), which crashed into Lake Corangamite, 400 metres (1,300 ft) from shore, on 17 March 1943.

In August 2021 the Wirraway main fuselage was recovered from the lake.

== See also ==
- List of lakes of Australia § Victoria
- List of Ramsar sites in Australia
- Leslie Manor
- Ramsar Convention
