= Woady Yaloak River =

Perennial river in Victoria, Australia

Woady Yaloak
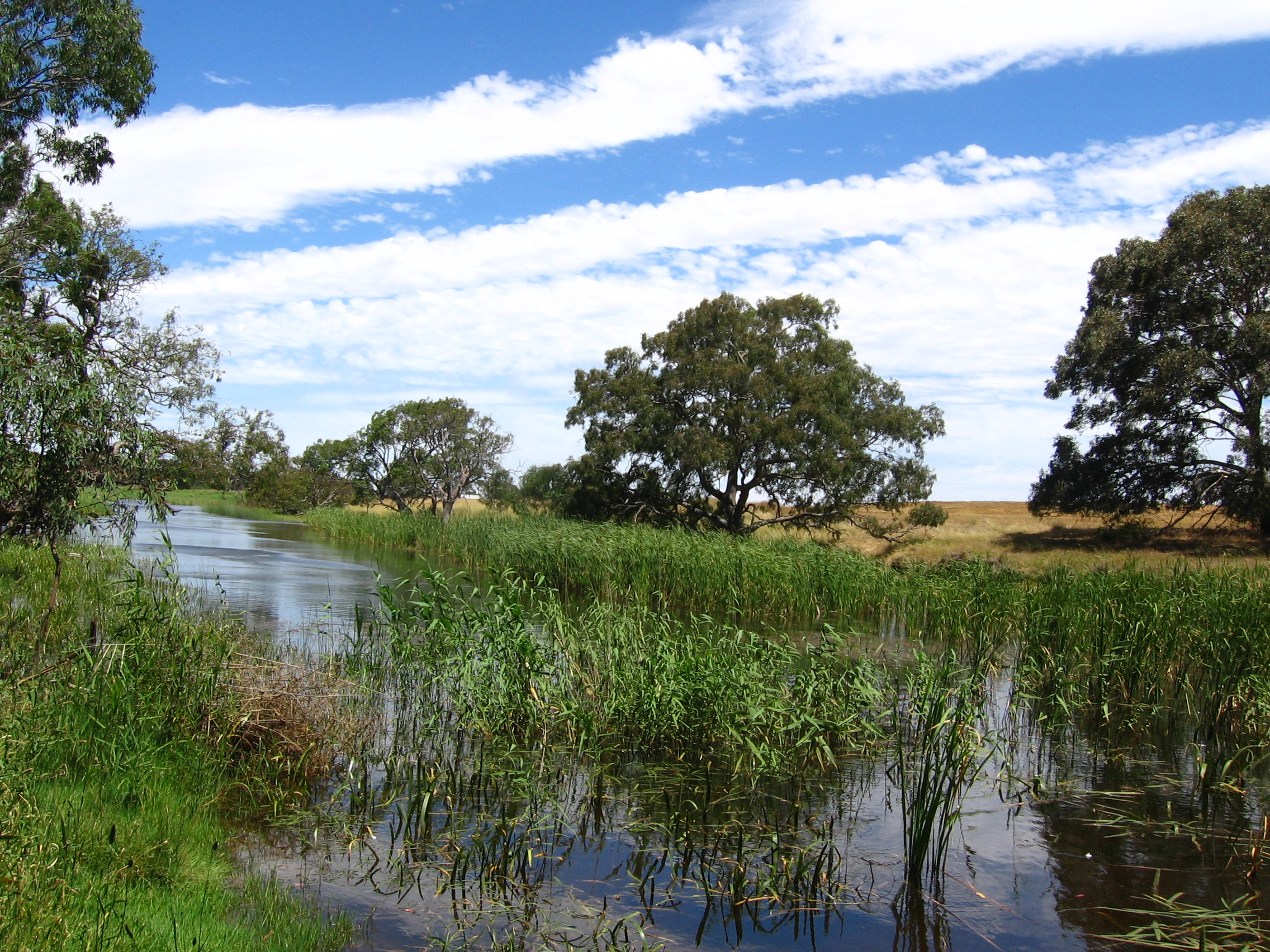
- Woady Yaloak River at Cressy, 2007

- Location of the Woady Yaloak River mouth in Victoria
- Etymology: Aboriginal Wathawurrung: Wurdi-yaluk: meaning "big creek"
- Native name: Wurdi-yaluk (Wathawurrung); Currarerer (Wathawurrung)

Location
- Country: Australia
- State: Victoria
- Region: Western District Lakes (IBRA)
- LGA: Corangamite Shire

Physical characteristics
- Source: Black Hill (Victoria)
  - location: west of Ballarat
  - coordinates: 37°32′8″S 143°43′4″E
  - elevation: 291 m (955 ft)
- Mouth: Lake Martin and then Lake Corangamite
  - coordinates: 38°05′26″S 143°37′28″E
  - elevation: 114 m (374 ft)
- Length: 104 km (65 mi)

Basin features
- River system: Corangamite catchment
- Tributaries
  - left: Mount Misery Creek, Kuruc-A-Ruc Creek
  - right: Naringhil Creek

The Woady Yaloak River is a perennial river of the Corangamite catchment, in the Western District Lakes region of the Australian state of Victoria.

== Location and features ==
The Woady Yaloak River rises below Black Hill, west of Ballarat and flows generally south joined by three minor tributaries through the towns of Smythesdale, Scarsdale and Cressy, before reaching its mouth at Lake Martin, which then flows into Lake Corangamite. From its highest point, the river descends 280 metres (920 ft) over its meandering 104-kilometre (65 mi) course.

The river is crossed by the Glenelg Highway west of Scarsdale, the Hamilton Highway at Cressy, and McMillans Bridge on the Rokewood-Skipton Road between Rokewood and Werneth.

== Etymology ==
In the Aboriginal Australian Wathawurrung language different sections of the river are given two names, Wurdi-yaluk or sometimes Wurdi-yaluk gundidj, meaning "big creek"; and Currarerer, with no defined meaning. Variations on the spelling of the river's name have included Wandinyallock, Wardiyallock and Worriyallock.

== See also ==
- List of rivers of Australia § Victoria
