= Western District Lakes =

Wetlands in south-eastern Australia

Coordinates: 38°10′S 143°31′E

Designations

Ramsar Wetland
- Official name: Western District Lakes
- Designated: 15 December 1982
- Reference no.: 268

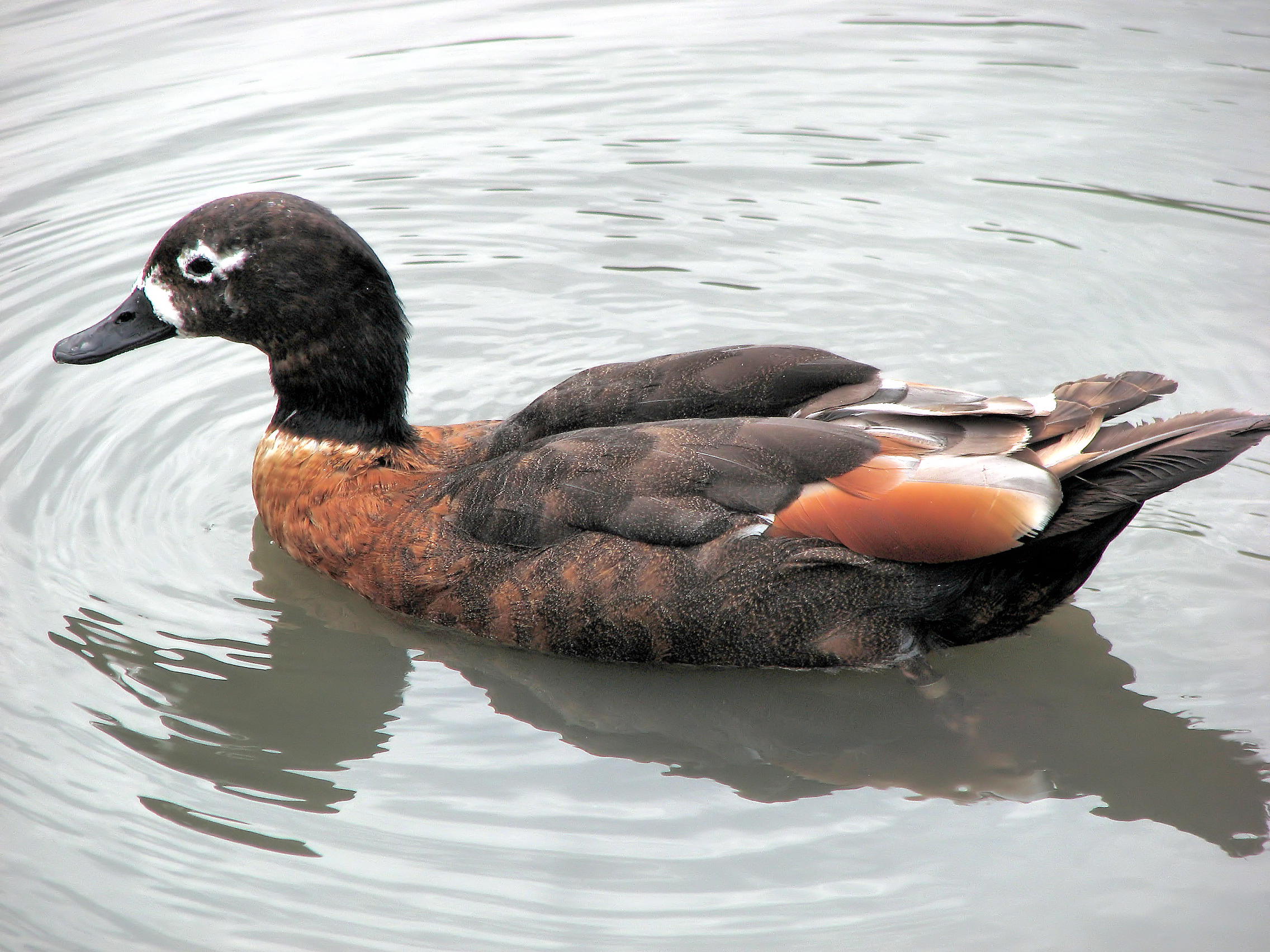
The lakes are an important area for Australian shelducks

The Western District Lakes of Victoria, in the Western District of Victoria, south-eastern Australia, were recognised on 15 December 1982 as wetlands of international importance by listing under the Ramsar Convention, as Ramsar site no.268.

== Description ==
The site comprises nine lakes with a combined area of 329 square kilometres (127 sq mi), varying in depth and salinity from fresh water to hypersaline. They include State Wildlife Reserves and Lake Reserves and serve as drought refuges for tens of thousands of waterbirds. Several threatened plants occur within the site, including the endangered Lepidium ashersonii. The lakes are used for various purposes, including recreational fishing and duck hunting as well as grazing, commercial fishing, and wastewater disposal. The lakes lie in a basaltic grassland landscape at an altitude of 40–90 metres (130–300 ft) above sea level. Average annual rainfall (recorded at Beeac) is 617 millimetres (24.3 in). Lakes included in the site are:

- Lake Beeac; hypersaline; 662 hectares (1,640 acres)
- Lake Bookar; 500 hectares (1,200 acres)
- Lake Colongulac; saline; 1,460 hectares (3,600 acres)
- Lake Corangamite; hypersaline; 23,300 hectares (58,000 acres)
- Lake Cundare; hypersaline; 395 hectares (980 acres)
- Lake Gnarpurt; saline; 2,350 hectares (5,800 acres)
- Lake Milangil; saline; 125 hectares (310 acres)
- Lake Murdeduke; saline; 1,550 hectares (3,800 acres)
- Lake Terangpom; fresh; 208 hectares (510 acres)

== Birds ==
The Ramsar-listed lakes, along with other nearby lakes have been identified by BirdLife International as a 384 square kilometres (148 sq mi) Important Bird Area (IBA) because they support over 1% of the world populations of Australian shelducks, chestnut teals and banded stilts and irregularly support over 1% of the world populations of freckled ducks, musk ducks, blue-billed ducks, black swans, Australasian shovellers, pink-eared ducks, hoary-headed grebes, straw-necked ibises, sharp-tailed sandpipers and white-headed stilts.

The additional lakes in the IBA are:

- Cundare Pool / Lake Martin; 3,730 hectares (9,200 acres); saline
- Lough Calvert (including Upper, Middle and Lower Lough Calvert)
- Lake Thurrumbong

Other birds for which the lakes occasionally support high numbers include double-banded plovers, red-necked avocets, Eurasian coots, great crested grebes, Australian pelicans, great cormorants, little pied cormorants, grey teals, whiskered terns, hardheads and red-necked stints.

== See also ==
- List of lakes of Australia § Victoria
