= List of places of worship in Corangamite Shire =

This is a list of places of worship in the Shire of Corangamite, a local government area in the state of Victoria, Australia. The list includes active and former churches and other religious buildings representing a variety of Christian denominations and other faiths.

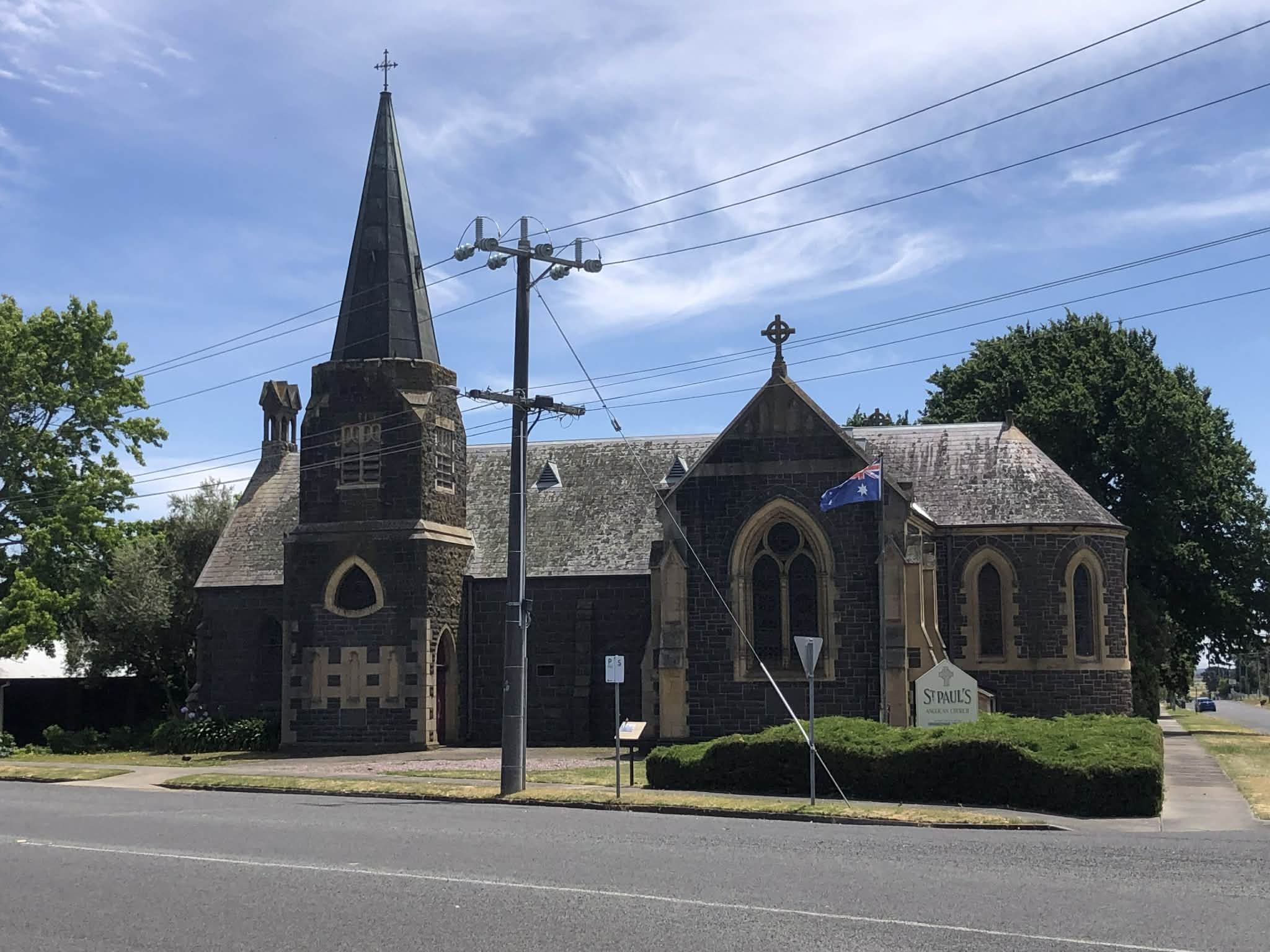
St Paul's Anglican Church, Camperdown

== Heritage listing status ==
Style	Status
Yes	Listed on the Victorian Heritage Register
–	Not listed

== Current places of worship ==
Current places of worship
Name	Image	Location	Denomination/ Affiliation	Heritage listing	Notes	Refs
Christ Church, Skipton		Skipton; 37.687017°S 143.369712°E	Anglican	–		
St Andrew's Presbyterian Church, Skipton		Skipton; 37.684840°S 143.360254°E	Presbyterian	Yes		
St John's Catholic Church, Skipton		Skipton; 37.687516°S 143.364354°E	Catholic	–		
St John the Baptist Catholic Church, Lismore		Lismore; 37.953485°S 143.337176°E	Catholic	–		
Lismore Presbyterian Church		Lismore; 37.952808°S 143.341603°E	Presbyterian	Yes		
Noorat (Neil Black Memorial) Presbyterian Church		Noorat; 38.190932°S 142.930332°E	Presbyterian	Yes		
All Saints' Anglican Church, Terang		Terang; 38.239511°S 142.921192°E	Anglican	–		
St Thomas the Apostle Catholic Church, Terang (new)		Terang; 38.240517°S 142.909980°E	Catholic	–		
Terang Uniting Church		Terang; 38.242648°S 142.920124°E	Uniting (formerly Methodist)	–		
Camperdown Presbyterian Church		Camperdown; 38.233851°S 143.143549°E	Presbyterian (formerly Methodist)	–		
Camperdown Seventh-day Adventist Church		Camperdown; 38.235196°S 143.140278°E	Seventh-day Adventist	–		
Camperdown (St Andrew's) Uniting Church		Camperdown; 38.236765°S 143.145751°E	Uniting (formerly Presbyterian)	Yes		
St Patrick's Catholic Church, Camperdown		Camperdown; 38.234698°S 143.141190°E	Catholic	–		
St Paul's Anglican Church, Camperdown		Camperdown; 38.230311°S 143.146811°E	Anglican	Yes		
Cobden Uniting Church		Cobden; 38.328526°S 143.074206°E	Uniting (formerly Methodist)	–		
St Brendan's Catholic Church, Cobden		Cobden; 38.328522°S 143.073443°E	Catholic	–		
Cobden Christian Reformed Church		Cobden; 38.327902°S 143.068755°E	Christian Reformed Church	–		
St Mary's Anglican Church, Cobden		Cobden; 38.328781°S 143.076657°E	Anglican	–		
St Jude's Anglican Church		Timboon; 38.480495°S 142.977052°E	Anglican	–		
St Joseph's Catholic Church, Timboon		Timboon; 38.484419°S 142.971131°E	Catholic	–		
Timboon Uniting Church		Timboon; 38.483405°S 142.973615°E	Uniting	–		
Port Campbell Baptist Church		Port Campbell; 38.619201°S 142.995313°E	Baptist	–		
St Andrew's Catholic Church, Simpson		Simpson; 38.501597°S 143.212680°E	Catholic	–		
Thomson Memorial Presbyterian Church		Terang; 38.240903°S 142.911246°E	Presbyterian	Yes		
Anglican Benedictine Monastery of St Mark		Camperdown; 38.249969°S 143.124045°E	Anglican	–		

== Former places of worship ==
Former places of worship
Name	Image	Location	Denomination/ Affiliation	Heritage listing	Notes	Refs
Bradvale Presbyterian Church		Bradvale; 37.793783°S 143.404166°E	Presbyterian	–		
Mingay Uniting Church		Mingay; 37.835519°S 143.325718°E	Uniting (formerly Presbyterian)	–		
St Augustine's Anglican Church, Lismore		Lismore; 37.953813°S 143.342310°E	Anglican	–	Moved to Werribee, converted to a house	
All Saints' Anglican Church, Derrinallum		Derrinallum; 37.948062°S 143.218611°E	Anglican	–		
Derrinallum Uniting Church		Derrinallum; 37.947801°S 143.220875°E	Uniting	–		
St Joseph's Catholic Church, Derrinallum		Derrinallum; 37.949026°S 143.217408°E	Catholic	–		
Gnarpurt Chapel		Lismore; 38.019619°S 143.359414°E	Presbyterian	Yes		
St Joseph's Catholic Church, Noorat		Noorat; 38.189535°S 142.931412°E	Catholic	–		
Noorat Anglican Church		Noorat; 38.191883°S 142.931565°E	Anglican	–		
Pomborneit Presbyterian Church		Pomborneit; 38.287787°S 143.299577°E	Presbyterian	–		
St James the Less Anglican Church		Pomborneit North; 38.272084°S 143.296514°E	Anglican	–		
Simpson Uniting Church		Simpson; 38.493603°S 143.205757°E	Uniting	–		
Berrybank Uniting Church		Berrybank; 37.981029°S 143.487685°E	Uniting (formerly Presbyterian)	–		
Timboon Community Church		Timboon; 38.483848°S 142.971491°E	Baptist	–		
St Thomas the Apostle Catholic Church, Terang (old)		Terang; 38.249222°S 142.918515°E	Catholic	Yes		

== See also ==
- List of places of worship in Colac Otway Shire
