= Shire of Heytesbury =

Coordinates: 38°20′S 143°04′E

Shire of Heytesbury Victoria
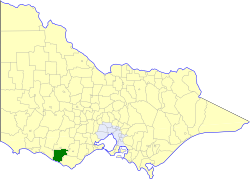
- Location in Victoria
- The Shire of Heytesbury as at its dissolution in 1994
- Population: 7,530 (1992)
  - Density: 4.832/km^{2} (12.515/sq mi)
- Established: 1895
- Area: 1,558.39 km^{2} (601.7 sq mi)
- Council seat: Cobden
- Region: Barwon South West
- County: Heytesbury
LGAs around Shire of Heytesbury:
Mortlake	Hampden	Colac
Warrnambool	Shire of Heytesbury	Otway
Southern Ocean	Southern Ocean	Southern Ocean

The Shire of Heytesbury was a local government area about 200 kilometres (124 mi) west-southwest of Melbourne, the state capital of Victoria, Australia. The shire covered an area of 1,558.39 square kilometres (601.7 sq mi), and existed from 1895 until 1994.

== History ==
Heytesbury was originally located within the Hampden and Heytesbury Road District, which was incorporated on 28 April 1857. On 31 May 1895, Heytesbury split away from the East and West Ridings of the Shire of Hampden, to become a shire in its own right. On 6 May 1919, parts of its area split away to join parts of the Shires of Colac and Winchelsea, to form the Shire of Otway. Otway annexed a small part of Heytesbury in 1969.

On 23 September 1994, the Shire of Heytesbury was abolished, and along with the Town of Camperdown, the Shire of Hampden, and parts of the Shires of Colac, Mortlake and the area around Princetown, on the Great Ocean Road, was merged into the newly created Shire of Corangamite. A small part in the shire's east was transferred to the newly created Shire of Colac Otway.

== Wards ==
The Shire of Heytesbury was divided into three ridings, each of which elected three councillors:

- East Riding
- West Riding
- South Riding

== Towns and localities ==
- Bostocks Creek
- Brucknell
- Bungador
- Carpendeit
- Cobden*
- Cobrico
- Cowleys Creek
- Curdies River
- Curdievale
- Dixie
- Ecklin South
- Elingamite
- Glenfyne
- Jancourt
- Koallah
- Lower Heytesbury
- Newfield
- Pomborneit
- Port Campbell
- Scotts Creek
- Simpson
- Stoneyford
- Tandarook
- Tesbury
- Timboon

* Council seat.

== Population ==
Year	Population
1954	6,464
1958	6,800*
1961	7,234
1966	8,181
1971	8,208
1976	7,902
1981	7,652
1986	7,487
1991	7,361

* Estimate in the 1958 Victorian Year Book.
