= Timboon (disambiguation) =

Timboon may refer to:

- Timboon, a town in Australia
- Timboon railway line
- Timboon Railway Shed Distillery

== See also ==
- Tim Boon
