= Shire of Hampden =

Coordinates: 38°11′S 143°12′E

Shire of Hampden Victoria
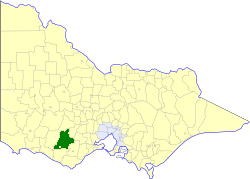
- Location in Victoria
- The Shire of Hampden as at its dissolution in 1994
- Population: 6,960 (1992)
  - Density: 2.6556/km^{2} (6.878/sq mi)
- Established: 1857
- Area: 2,620.91 km^{2} (1,011.9 sq mi)
- Council seat: Camperdown
- Region: Barwon South West
- County: Hampden, Grenville
LGAs around Shire of Hampden:
Ararat	Ripon	Grenville
Mortlake	Shire of Hampden	Leigh
Warrnambool	Heytesbury	Colac

The Shire of Hampden was a local government area about 200 kilometres (124 mi) west-southwest of Melbourne, the state capital of Victoria, Australia. The shire covered an area of 2,620.91 square kilometres (1,011.9 sq mi), and existed from 1857 until 1994.

== History ==
Hampden was first incorporated as the Hampden and Heytesbury Road District on 28 April 1857, and became a shire on 31 December 1863. On 31 May 1895, it lost parts of its East and West Wards to create the Shire of Heytesbury. On 9 September 1952, the Borough of Camperdown severed from its East Riding. Its boundary was adjusted on 31 May 1977, to include all of Skipton.

On 23 September 1994, the Shire of Hampden was abolished, and along with the Town of Camperdown and parts of the Shires of Colac, Heytesbury and Mortlake, and the area around Princetown, on the Great Ocean Road, was amalgamated into the newly created Shire of Corangamite.

== Wards ==
The Shire of Hampden was divided into three ridings, each of which elected three councillors:

- North Riding
- South Riding
- West Riding

== Towns and localities ==
- Berrybank
- Bookaar
- Boorcan
- Bradvale
- Chocolyn
- Derrinallum
- Duverney
- Foxhow
- Glenormiston
- Gnotuk
- Kariah
- Leslie Manor
- Lismore
- Mingay
- Mount Bute
- Naroghid
- Noorat
- Skipton
- Terang
- Vite Vite
- Weerite

== Population ==
Year	Population
1954	8,781
1958	9,050*
1961	9,176
1966	8,766
1971	7,411
1976	7,574
1981	7,471
1986	7,072
1991	6,780

* Estimate in the 1958 Victorian Year Book.
