= Cooriemungle =

Cooriemungle Victoria
- Coordinates: 38°32′27″S 143°4′43″E
- Population: 364 (2016 census)
- Postcode(s): 3268
- LGA(s): Corangamite Shire
- State electorate(s): Polwarth
- Federal division(s): Wannon

Cooriemungle is a locality within the Shire of Corangamite in Victoria, Australia. At the 2016 census, Cooriemungle had a population of 364.

In 1938 the Cooriemungle Prison Farm was established and provided accommodation to 60 low risk prisoners. These prisoners were generally serving out the last term of their sentences. In this remote area they helped the Forest Commission to clear bush in the East Otway forest as part of the Heytesbury Settlement Scheme. The farm was self-sufficient with dairy cattle, sheep, pigs, a sawmill and its own orchard and vegetable garden.

The prison farm closed on 1st December 1977 and four years later in June 1981, 20 hectares of the site was handed over to the Department of Conservation and Environment and reserved for public recreation to utilise the existing facilities and preserving the historically significant buildings. The rest of the land was sold off to local farmers.
