= Curdie =

Curdie may refer to:

- Curdies River, a river in Australia.
- Mount Curdie, a mountain in Australia.
- Daniel Curdie, an Australian pioneer born in 1810 and died in 1884.
- James Curdie Russell, a Scottish minister born in 1830 and died in 1925.
- Curdie Peterson, a fictional character from George MacDonald's novels The Princess and the Goblin and The Princess and Curdie.
