= Heytesbury (disambiguation) =

Heytesbury is a village, civil parish and former hundred in Wiltshire, England.

Heytesbury may also refer to:

== Relating to the Wiltshire place ==
- Heytesbury (UK Parliament constituency), abolished 1832
- Baron Heytesbury, peerage of the United Kingdom

== Other uses ==
- Heytesbury Pty. Ltd., Australian company
- Heytesbury Street, Dublin, Ireland
- County of Heytesbury, Victoria, Australia
- Shire of Heytesbury, former local government area, Victoria, Australia
- Heytesbury Settlement Scheme, Victoria, Australia
- William of Heytesbury (c. 1313 – 1372/1373), English philosopher and logician
- Baron Hungerford of Heytesbury (1503 – 1540)
