= Camperdown-Timboon Rail Trail =

Rail trail in Victoria, Australia

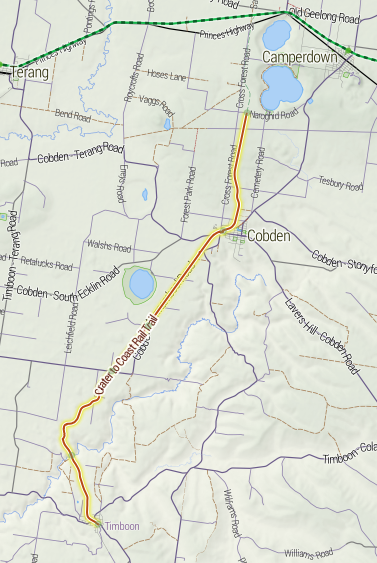
Map of the rail trail.

The Camperdown-Timboon Rail Trail is a rail trail running along the former route of the Timboon railway line, from Camperdown to Timboon in Victoria's southwest.

The 22 km section from Camperdown to Timboon was completed in 2009, with the section from Camperdown to Naroghid on-road, and the remainder following the roadbed of the former railway. The trestle bridge over the Curdies River was restored and reopened for use in 2010.

The route is also referred to as the Crater to Coast Rail Trail, in reference to an eventual extension to Port Campbell via a new roadside path.

The trail's southern terminus is the former Timboon railway station, now home to the Timboon Railway Shed Distillery.
