= Brucknell =

Brucknell may refer to:

- Brucknell, Victoria, town in Australia
- Kitty Brucknell, singer-songwriter
