= Les Meade =

Australian rules footballer, born 1904

Personal information
- Full name: Edward Leslie Meade
- Born: 4 November 1904; Terang, Victoria
- Died: 9 November 1989 (aged 85)
- Original team: Yarraville
- Height: 173 cm (5 ft 8 in)
- Weight: 69 kg (152 lb)

Playing career^{1}
Years	Club	Games (Goals)
1927–28	Melbourne	7 (0)
1929–31	Hawthorn	24 (0)
Total		31 (0)
- ^{1} Playing statistics correct to the end of 1931.

Edward Leslie "Les" Meade (4 November 1904 – 9 November 1989) was an Australian rules footballer who played with Melbourne and Hawthorn in the Victorian Football League (VFL).

Born in Terang, Les Meade was the third child of Edward Meade and Emily Elizabeth Ayres. He joined Melbourne from Yarraville at the start of the 1927 VFL season.

Les Meade married Vivienne Alexandra Johnson Maxwell in 1931 and they lived in Glen Iris for over forty years. He also served in the Royal Australian Naval Reserve in World War II. He died in 1989.
