= Scotts Creek, Victoria =

Scotts Creek Victoria
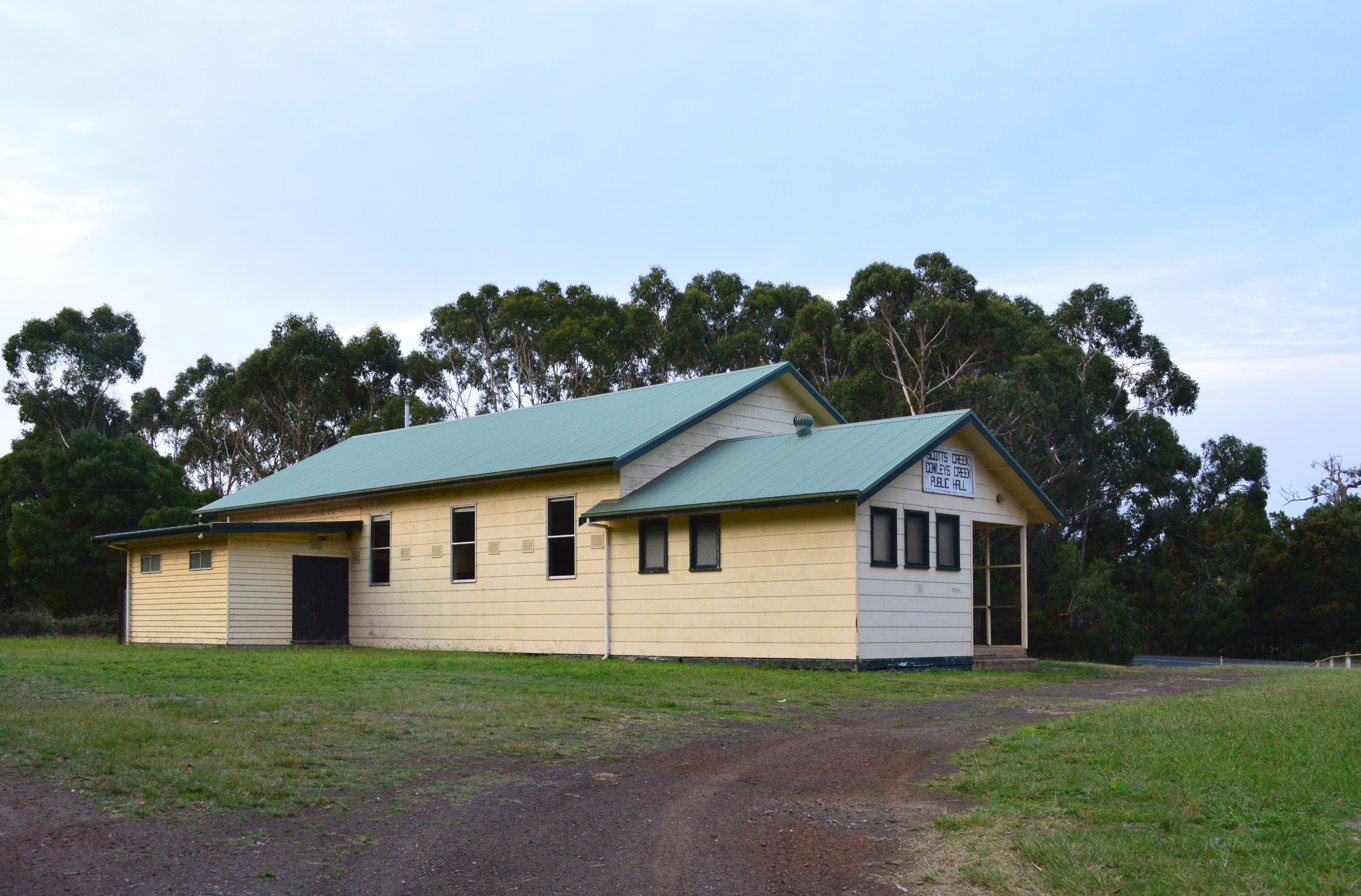
- The Scotts Creek Cowleys Creek Public Hall, 2012

- Coordinates: 38°27′00″S 143°02′59″E
- Population: 248 (2016 census)
- Postcode(s): 3267
- Location: 210 km (130 mi) SW of Melbourne; 59 km (37 mi) W of Colac; 21 km (13 mi) N of Port Campbell; 20 km (12 mi) S of Cobden; 8 km (5 mi) E of Timboon
- LGA(s): Corangamite Shire
- State electorate(s): Polwarth
- Federal division(s): Wannon

Scotts Creek is a locality in south-west Victoria, Australia, in the Corangamite Shire, 210 kilometres (130 mi) south-west of the state capital, Melbourne. Located where the Timboon-Colac Rd intersects the Cobden-Port Campbell Rd, Scotts Creek was a part of the original pastoral run of Daniel Curdie. Later the area was explored by gold prospectors but didn't find anything. Later came the timber workers and then the farmers. In 1886 the area was burnt out by the summer bushfires, but no-one was killed.

In the 1950s the area was the western extent of the Heytesbury Settlement Scheme. The scheme involved the clearing of the Heytesbury Forest to allow for the establishment of a dairy industry in the area. In time the area became one of Australia's most productive dairy regions. The influx of farming families allow the formation of the Scotts Creek Football club. The club competed in the Heytesbury Football Association until it wound up in 1995.

At the 2016 census, Scotts Creek had a population of 248.

The area was again burnt out in the March 2018 bushfire.
