= South Purrumbete, Victoria =

Locality in Victoria, Australia

South Purrumbete
- Town
- Interactive map of South Purrumbete
- Coordinates: 38°21′S 143°13′E
- Country: Australia
- State: Victoria
- LGA: Corangamite Shire
- Location: 12 km (7.5 mi) east of Cobden; 200 km (120 mi) southwest of Melbourne

Government
  - State electorate: Polwarth
  - Federal division: Wannon

Population
  - Total: 124 (2021 census)
- Postcode: 3260
Localities around South Purrumbete
Bostocks Creek	Tandarook	Koallah, Pomborneit
Bullaharre	South Purrumbete	Stonyford
Cobden	Carpendeit

South Purrumbete is a locality in the Shire of Corangamite, Victoria, Australia. At the 2021 census, South Purrumbete had a population of 124.

== History ==
The Purrumbete pastoral run was established in the area in 1838. Smaller farm selections in the area were taken up around 1872 to 1976. The land was volcanic and suitable for grazing and dairying. A school was established in 1877, with Catholic and Presbyterian churches soon after. The school closed in 1993. The churches have also closed.
