= Curdievale =

Curdievale Victoria
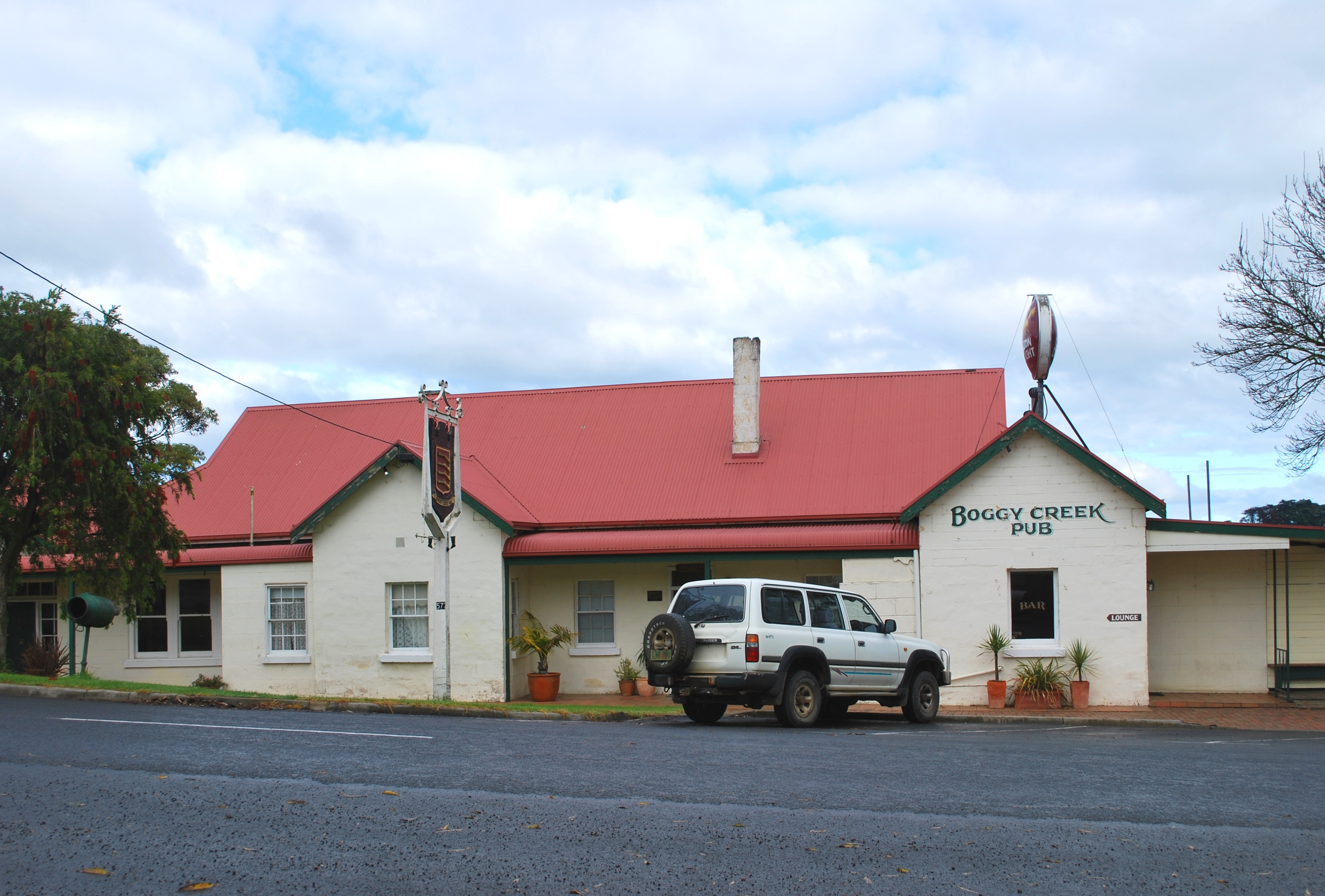
- Boggy Creek Pub at Curdievale

- Coordinates: 38°31′13″S 142°50′12″E
- Population: 124 (2016 census)
- Postcode(s): 3268
- Location: 240 km (149 mi) SW of Melbourne; 42 km (26 mi) SE of Warrnambool; 16 km (10 mi) SW of Timboon
- LGA(s): Corangamite Shire; Shire of Moyne
- State electorate(s): Polwarth
- Federal division(s): Wannon

Curdievale is a locality in south west Victoria, Australia. The locality is shared between the Corangamite Shire and the Shire of Moyne, 240 kilometres (150 mi) south west of the state capital, Melbourne.

Curdievale is nestled on both sides of the Curdies River, its major place of interest is the Boggy Creek Hotel built in 1853, where the locals drop in for a drink and a meal.

At the 2016 census, Curdievale had a population of 124.
