= Shire of Otway =

Coordinates: 38°38′S 143°34′E

Shire of Otway Victoria
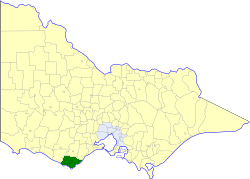
- Location in Victoria
- The Shire of Otway as at its dissolution in 1994
- Population: 3,960 (1992)
  - Density: 2.0766/km^{2} (5.378/sq mi)
- Established: 1919
- Area: 1,906.94 km^{2} (736.3 sq mi)
- Council seat: Beech Forest
- Region: Barwon South West
- County: Heytesbury, Polwarth
LGAs around Shire of Otway:
Heytesbury	Colac	Winchelsea
Heytesbury	Shire of Otway	Bass Strait
Southern Ocean	Bass Strait	Bass Strait

The Shire of Otway was a local government area about 190 kilometres (118 mi) southwest of Melbourne, the state capital of Victoria, Australia. The shire covered an area of 1,906.94 square kilometres (736.3 sq mi), and existed from 1919 until 1994.

== History ==
Otway was incorporated as a shire on 6 May 1919, carved out of parts of the Shires of Colac, Heytesbury and Winchelsea. In 1964, it annexed further parts of Heytesbury (in Coradjil Parish) and Winchelsea (in Kanglang Parish). In 1969, it lost the town of Simpson to Heytesbury.

On 23 September 1994, the Shire of Otway was abolished, and along with the City of Colac and parts of the Shires of Colac, Heytesbury and Winchelsea, was merged into the newly created Shire of Colac Otway. The township of Princetown merged west into the newly created Shire of Corangamite.

== Wards ==
The Shire of Otway was divided into four ridings in 1987, each of which elected three councillors:

- Apollo Bay Riding
- Coastal Riding
- Central Riding
- West Riding

== Towns and localities ==
- Apollo Bay
- Barham Paradise
- Beech Forest*
- Cape Otway
- Carlisle River
- Forrest
- Gellibrand
- Glenaire
- Hordern Vale
- Johanna
- Kennett River
- Lavers Hill
- Marengo
- Princetown
- Skenes Creek
- Wye River
- Wyelangta
- Yuulong

* Council seat.

== Population ==
Year	Population
1954	4,197
1958	4,360*
1961	4,036
1966	3,902
1971	3,921
1976	3,808
1981	3,741
1986	3,541
1991	3,784

* Estimate in the 1958 Victorian Year Book.
