= Les Simpson =

Hugh Leslie Simpson CBE (3 October 1894 – 7 June 1968) was an Australian farmer and soldier-settlement administrator.

Simpson was born at Birchip in Victoria to bookseller Albert Edward Simpson and Ellen, née Campbell. He attended local state schools and received his secondary education at Ballarat and Stawell before working on the family farm. During World War I he enlisted in the Australian Imperial Force (30 June 1915), serving on the Western Front in the 5th Battalion from March 1916. A lieutenant, he was badly wounded in August 1918. After the war he returned to farming and on 1 March 1924 married nurse Barbara Catherine Jane Catto at St Kilda.

In 1934 Simpson was elected chief president of the Victorian Wheatgrowers' Association and the following year won the equivalent position in the federal body, serving until 1936. He was a Wycheproof Shire councillor from 1932 to 1946 and was chief president of the United Country Party from 1938 to 1940 and in 1944. He unsuccessfully contested the federal seat of Wimmera in 1934 and the state seat of Walhalla in 1943. From 1935 to 1946 he sat on the Victorian Farmers' Debts Adjustment Board, serving as chairman from 1941 to 1946; he advised the federal prices commissioner during World War II and received appointments from state and federal Labor governments. In 1946 he was appointed inaugural chairman of the Soldier Settlement Commission (SSC).

Under Simpson's leadership, the SSC had considerable independence from government and successfully coordinated the organisation of returned servicemen's grants; 6000 soldiers were placed on farms. He retired in 1963 and was appointed Commander of the Order of the British Empire. In 1968 he died at Hampton in Melbourne; the township of Simpson, near Cobden, is named for him.
