= Terang College =

Location
- 45 Strong Street; Terang, Victoria; Australia; 38°14′47″S 142°55′16″E

Information
- Type: Public, co-educational, secondary, day school
- Motto: Together We Grow – From Good to Great
- Established: 1848; 178 years ago
- Principal: Kath Tanner (2021)
- Teaching staff: 35 (2010)
- Years offered: Prep–12
- Enrollment: 255 (2025)
- Campus: Terang, Victoria
- Website: www.terangcollege.vic.edu.au

Terang College is a government school located in Terang, Victoria, Australia. The school was established in 1848 as Terang Primary School.

The school educates over 400 students from preparatory to year 12 on two campuses. The primary campus is located on the Southern (Warrnambool) side of the town and houses years preparatory to 4. The secondary campus is on Strong Street, and comprises a middle years section and an upper years section. This campus caters for children in years 5 to 12.

Four of its students have been killed in road accidents. To commemorate the deceased students, and to draw attention to road safety, in 2008–09 two students led a school-based apprenticeship project to build a 35-metre treated pine boardwalk.

A wetlands precinct has been established to highlight and educate about the changing needs of the environment, and this is situated at the secondary campus. A student vegetable garden is in use, and is tended to each year by a certain year level of students.

The produce from this garden is frequently utilised in the school's home economics section.

Students at the school in 2008 were able to become members of the Academy of Sport, which focuses on students being given an opportunity to receive specialised training in particular sports, as decided each year. This is one of only a few schools in the state to run such programs.

In 2013 principal Adam Box, announced that he would be moving to South Australia, to work with the Education Department of South Australia to bring his unique skill base to the South Australian Education system. The new principal for 2014 is Peter Lee.

In 2015, the departure of the interim principal Peter Lee, was met with the appointment in the new principal Greg Button.

Current School Principal Kath Tanner was appointed in July 2021.

The original school bell, the oldest bell in Australia, is displayed at the primary site. The bell was cast in Adelaide by William Pybus in 1845.

In 2013, Terang College became part of the BEACON program, a program which helps provide students with knowledge to help with future business endeavours. Beacon Ambassadors were chosen to represent the school at a variety of functions engaging parts of the local business community.
