= Simpson, Victoria =

Simpson Victoria
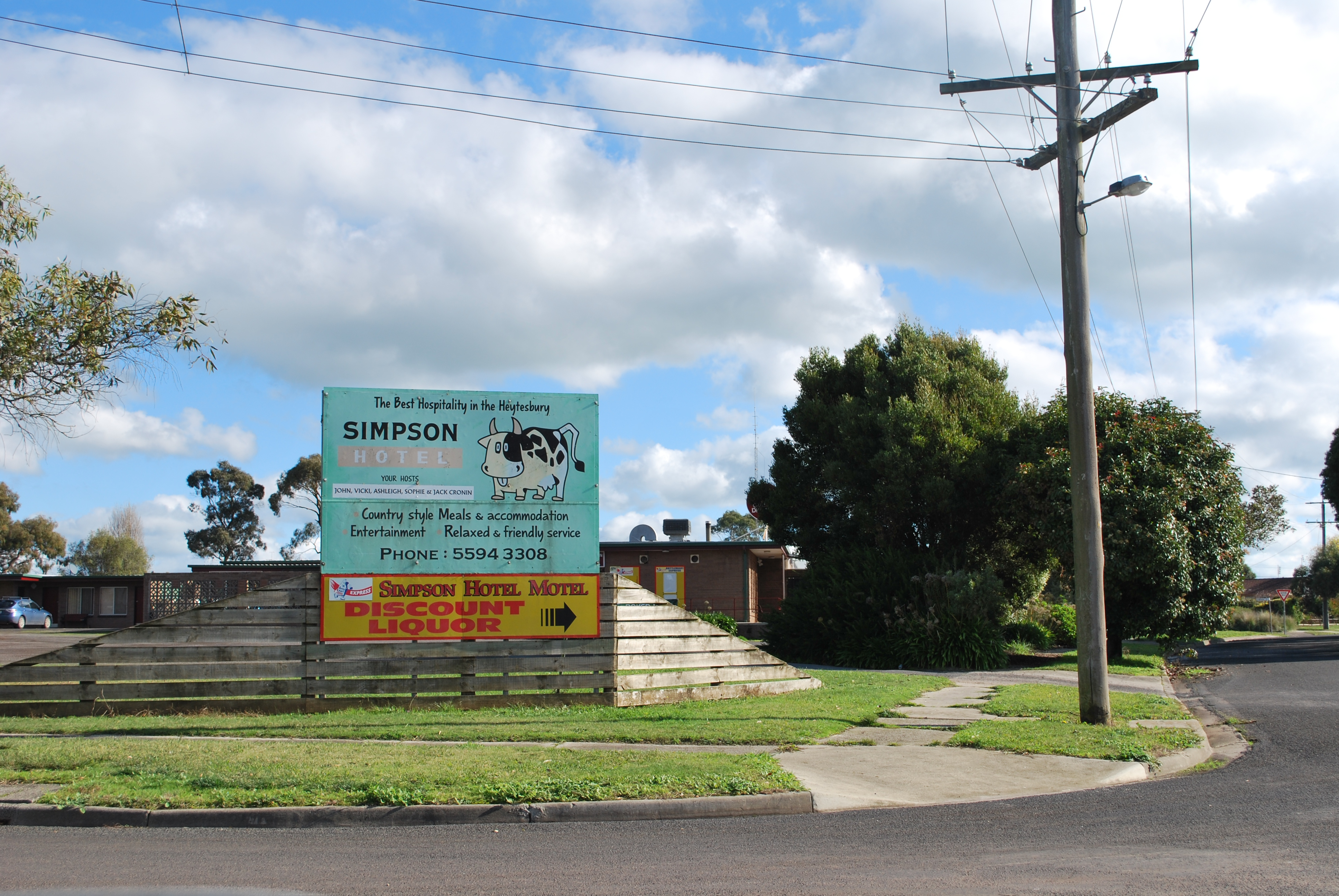
- Simpson Hotel

- Coordinates: 38°29′0″S 143°12′0″E
- Population: 583 (SAL 2021)
- Established: 1952
- Postcode(s): 3266
- Location: 220 km (137 mi) SW of Melbourne; 20 km (12 mi) N of Port Campbell
- LGA(s): Corangamite Shire; Colac Otway Shire
- State electorate(s): Polwarth
- Federal division(s): Wannon
Localities around Simpson:
Jancourt East; Scotts Creek	Jancourt East	Bungador; Irrewillipe
Scotts Creek	Simpson	Carlisle River
Cooriemungle	Kennedys Creek	Chapple Vale

Simpson is a town in the Western District of Victoria Australia. The town is in a dairying region and lies about halfway between Colac and the coastal fishing resort of Port Campbell. Most of the town is located in the Corangamite Shire, but a small, forested section lies in the Shire of Colac Otway. Simpson is 20 kilometres (12 mi) south of Cobden. At the 2016 census, Simpson had a population of 569.

The town is named after Les Simpson, the first chairman of the Soldier Settlement Commission. Prior to the formation of the Soldier Settlement Commission in 1946, the large bush land tract known as the Heytesbury Forest was under consideration as a possible settlement area.

Simpson is part of one of the most productive dairying centres in Australia. Dairying has become a major activity in the area and a significant contributor to the State’s dairying industry. The region consists of dissected plains exposing a range of land types with different topography, lithology and soils. This results in a range of responses to land use and climate.

The town today services the needs of 400 plus farms, through Education, Health and Produce.

== History ==
Simpson was part of the Heytesbury Settlement. The Heytesbury region was settled as part of a returned soldier program. In 1960 the first settlers took up their farms, Simpson Post Office opened on 4 September 1962 as the population grew, and by 1976 there were 378 families in occupation with further families to follow as more land was cleared. The amount of the Heytesbury Settlement developed to pasture was 43,000 hectares (110,000 acres). The Heytesbury Shire established a committee to help promote the scheme in collaboration with the Colac and Otway Shire councils. In 1946 an advisory committee was appointed by the Soldier Settlement Commission. This committee associated itself with several government departments with the intention of establishing an operation of an experimental area which was started in 1947. The potential of this country for pastures was overwhelming, the project commenced in 1956. Jack Shepherd owner of a local earth moving business won the contract to build the first 5 miles (8 km) of gravel road (now sealed) into the settlement, branching off from the Scotts Creek- Colac Road as it was then called. He then went on to build a number of dams for the farmers and buying and selling the farmers' calves in Colac.

== Parks ==
A park has been set beside a natural dam in the heart of town offering visitors the chance to learn about the development of the Heytesbury Settlement, a display featuring the large equipment used to help with the clearance of the Heytesbury Forest can also be seen here.

A 5 tonne steel land clearing "high Ball" was constructed from 19 mm (0.75 in) mild steel plate in 1953 by Hume Steel Pty. Ltd. In 1956 it was employed in Heytesbury Forest for all timber clearing operations on the 50,000 hectares (120,000 acres) project until completion in 1971. In operation the ball was pulled by two 180-kilowatt (240 hp) tractors one attached to 60-metre (200 ft) chains on either side. A tree pusher tractor followed to assist the pulling of larger trees.

== Education ==
The town has a primary school for children from prep to year 6. Secondary school students are bused to Cobden Technical School, Timboon P12 school, Mercy Regional College or Camperdown College.

== Sport ==
The town has an Australian Rules football team playing in the Colac & District FL.
