= St Andrew's Presbyterian Church, Skipton =

Presbyterian church in Victoria, Australia

St Andrew's Presbyterian Church
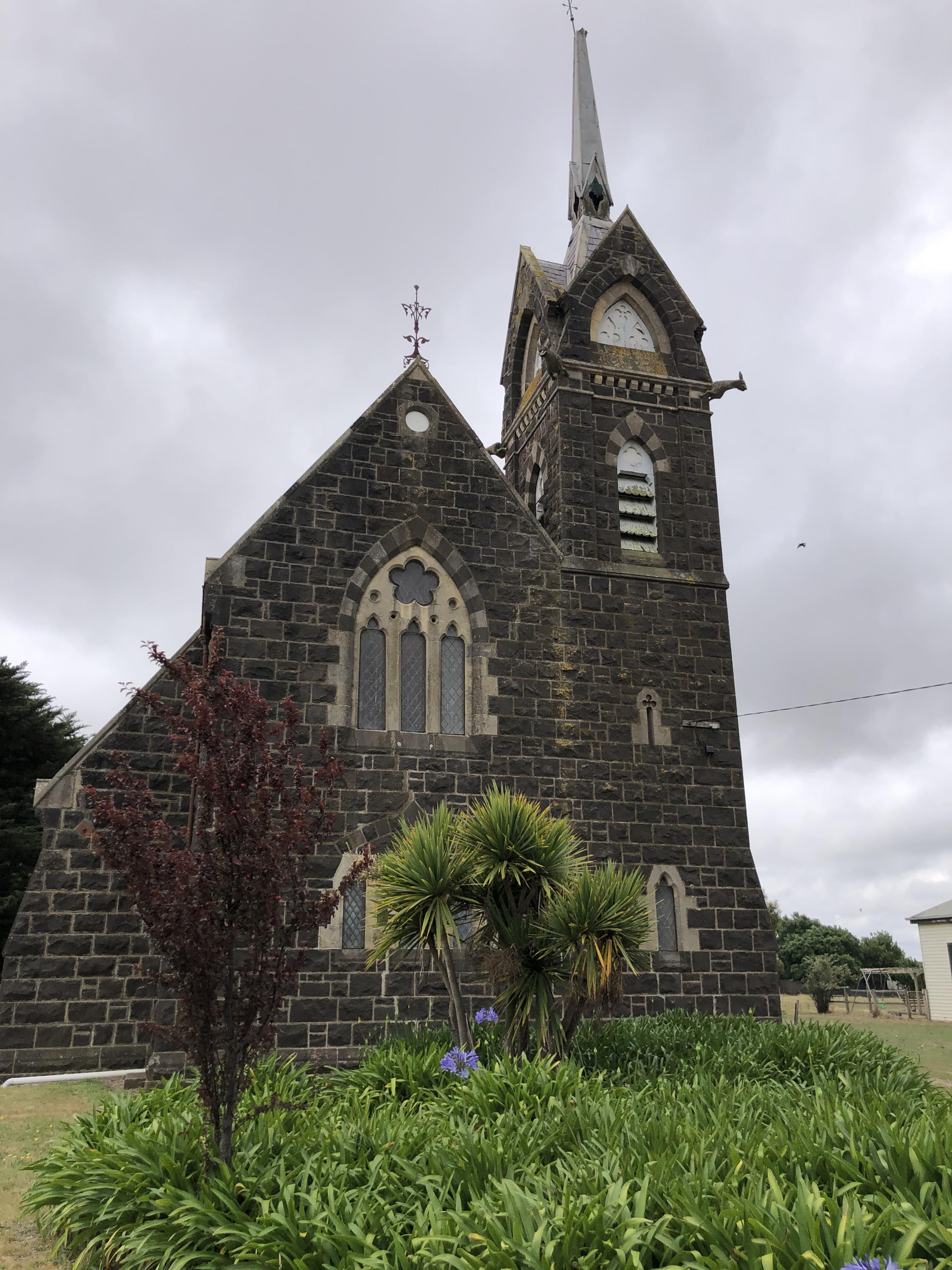
- St Andrew's Presbyterian Church
- St Andrew's Presbyterian Church
- 37°41′05″S 143°21′37″E
- Location: 50 Montgomery Street, Skipton, Victoria
- Country: Australia
- Denomination: Presbyterian

History
- Status: Active
- Dedication: Saint Andrew

Architecture
- Architect(s): Davidson and Henderson
- Architectural type: Church
- Style: Gothic Revival
- Years built: 1871-1872

Victorian Heritage Register
- Official name: St Andrew's Presbyterian Church
- Type: Local heritage
- Reference no.: B3304

St Andrew's Presbyterian Church is a heritage-listed Presbyterian church located in the town of Skipton, Victoria, Australia. The current bluestone church, built between 1871 and 1872 to designs of architects Davidson and Henderson, is notable for its incorporation of gargoyles in the form of kangaroos.

== History ==
Presbyterian activity in the area began with a letter, dated 19 April 1854, directed to the Presbytery of Melbourne, written by pastoralist Francis Ormond, who lived at Borriyaloak, requesting a minister to serve the area. By July, Rev. T. McAnlis was appointed. Initial services were conducted at Baangal homestead, the home of Alex Anderson, a Presbyterian pastoralist. On 8 September, a meeting was held at the homestead to discuss the erection of a church and manse.

The tender for the original church's brickwork was called on 6 July 1857, by Mr. Ed. Stevens, and the carpentry work on 22 July, by Mr. Jas. Jarvis. The brickwork was finally paid off on 31 October 1857, and the carpentry work on 3 December that same year. During this time a wooden building was constructed to serve as the manse. This original church was located north-east of the town's cemetery.

As the congregation outgrew the small church, it was decided to build a larger building. Alexander Davidson and George Henderson were commissioned to design the new church. Francis Ormond, who was particularly keen for the church to be built, contributed £300, a fifth of the total cost, in an effort to inspire others to contribute financially. The church was officially opened on 15 September 1872.

In June 1966, Dutch Australian stained glass artist Jean Orval was commissioned for the creation of two windows, dedicated to parishioners Mary Irene Blackwood (1888-1962) and Muriel Currie (1881-1962). Both windows depict a bouquet of flowers, with Jean gaining inspiration from photographs of flowers taken by Lady Joyce Pilditch of Langi Willi, who was instrumental in the installation process. She went so far as to collect flowers in England whilst travelling there, in order to inspire Orval. By March 1967, Jean presented a design to Lady Pilditch, who subsequently approved and sent Jean money to commence the official window. By April that year, they were ready to be installed, and a dedication ceremony was held on Saturday 22 April. Lady Pilditch went on to leave $100 in a wallet in Jean's car, with a thank you note, stating that the money was "to give you a day or two of leisure to restore your mind, your eyes and your soul".

== See also ==
- Mingay Uniting Church
