= Timboon P-12 School =

Public school in Timboon, Australia

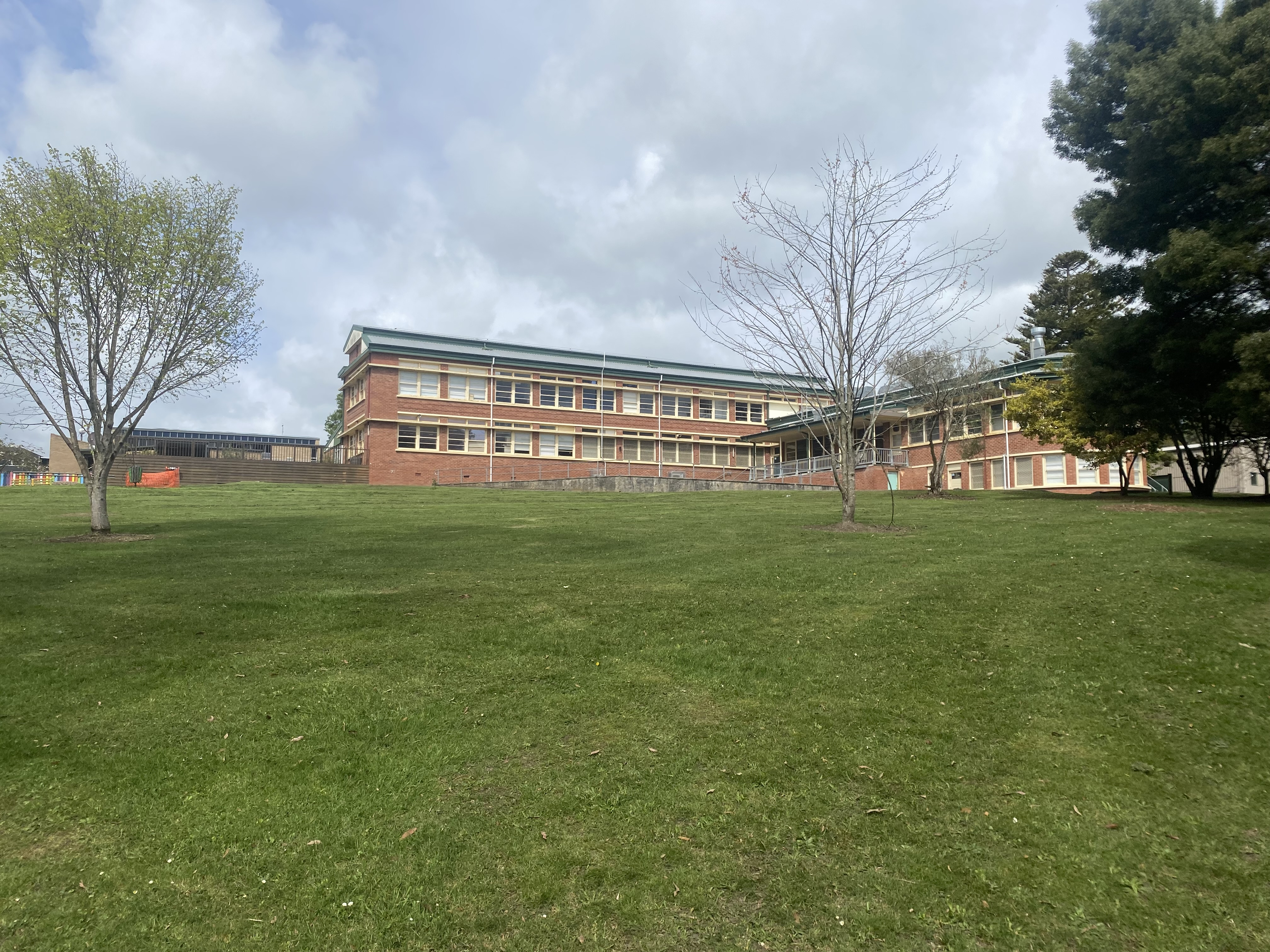
- Timboon P-12 School, 2024

Location
- 13 Bailey St; Timboon, Victoria, Australia , 3268; 38.48370°S 142.97566°E

Information
- Former names: Timboon High School, Timboon Consolidated School
- School type: Public
- Motto: Strength Through Understanding
- Established: 26 July 1948
- Founder: Ed Magilton
- Principal: Matt Dodson
- Years offered: Prep - Year 12
- Campuses: Junior School 1, Junior School 2, Junior School 3, High School, Library (shared with public)
- Houses: Halladale , Naragourt and Callaway
- Colors: Navy Blue, Yellow, Red
- Website: Official site

Timboon P-12 School is a public co-educational primary and secondary school located in the town of Timboon, Victoria, Australia. It is administered by the Victorian Department of Education, with an enrolment of 458 students and a teaching staff of 50, as of 2023. The school serves students from Prep to Year 12. It was the first purpose-built consolidated school in the state of Victoria.

== History ==
In 1944, the cost of the school was estimated at £20,000, and when opened it was to be "the most up-to-date school in Victoria". Its opening was to close 12 schools within the district, but ended up closing 16 schools when it opened. In November 1945, a tender was accepted for the school construction, which amounted to £26,537. By December of the very same year, the construction had started.

The schools that were shutting down due to the consolidation process had operated until Friday, 23 July 1948, with the consolidated school opening on Monday, 26 July 1948 without an official opening ceremony. The president of the Advisory Council decided the school would not have an official opening ceremony and it would occur at a later date. There were more than 400 students who attended the opening day.

By the schools opening in 1948, the overall cost of the school had risen to £50,000, and by 1950, it had risen to £80,000. The Victorian premier at the time, John McDonald, had unveiled a plaque for the school in 1950.

In 1960 the school split into two; Timboon High School and Timboon Consolidated School but reverted to a combined school in 1995.

In 2013, the school was shut down "indefinitely" after asbestos and other safety concerns were identified such as peeling paint, which was believed to be lead-based. Staff and students were quickly vacated from the school and were sent to the town hall for the remainder of the day. The town hall was used as a school for the students for one school term, while the school was receiving asbestos removal. After its reopening, the school campaigned for new buildings, however, the old buildings could not be removed due to being heritage listed.

== Demographics ==
In 2023, the school had a student enrollment of 458 with 50 teachers (43.7 full-time equivalent) and 16 non-teaching staff (11.9 full-time equivalent). Female enrollments consisted of 244 students and Male enrollments consisted of 214 students; Indigenous enrollments accounted for a total of 1% and 7% of students had a language background other than English.

== See also ==
- List of government schools in Victoria, Australia
