= Town of Camperdown =

Town of Camperdown Victoria
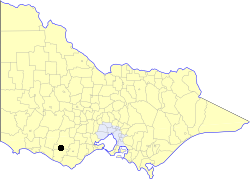
- Location in Victoria
- The Town of Camperdown as at its dissolution in 1994
- Population: 3,480 (1992)
  - Density: 239.2/km^{2} (619.5/sq mi)
- Established: 1952
- Area: 14.55 km^{2} (5.6 sq mi)
- Council seat: Camperdown
- Region: Barwon South West
- County: Hampden

The Town of Camperdown was a local government area about 200 kilometres (124 mi) west-southwest of Melbourne, the state capital of Victoria, Australia, centred on Camperdown. The town covered an area of 14.55 square kilometres (5.6 sq mi), and existed from 1952 until 1994. Its area was surrounded by the Shire of Hampden.

== History ==
Originally, the town's area was part of the East Riding of the Shire of Hampden, which was incorporated in 1857. On 9 September 1952, Camperdown was severed and incorporated as a separate borough. It became a town on 21 January 1959.

On 23 September 1994, the Town of Camperdown was abolished, and along with the Shire of Hampden and parts of the Shires of Colac, Heytesbury, Mortlake, and the area around Princetown, on the Great Ocean Road, was merged into the newly created Corangamite Shire.

=== Wards ===
The Town of Camperdown was not subdivided into wards, and the nine councillors represented the entire area.

== Population ==
Year	Population
1954	3,205
1958	3,400*
1961	3,446
1966	3,537
1971	3,477
1976	3,596
1981	3,315
1986	3,596
1991	3,545

* Estimate in 1958 Victorian Year Book.
