= Jancourt East =

- Town
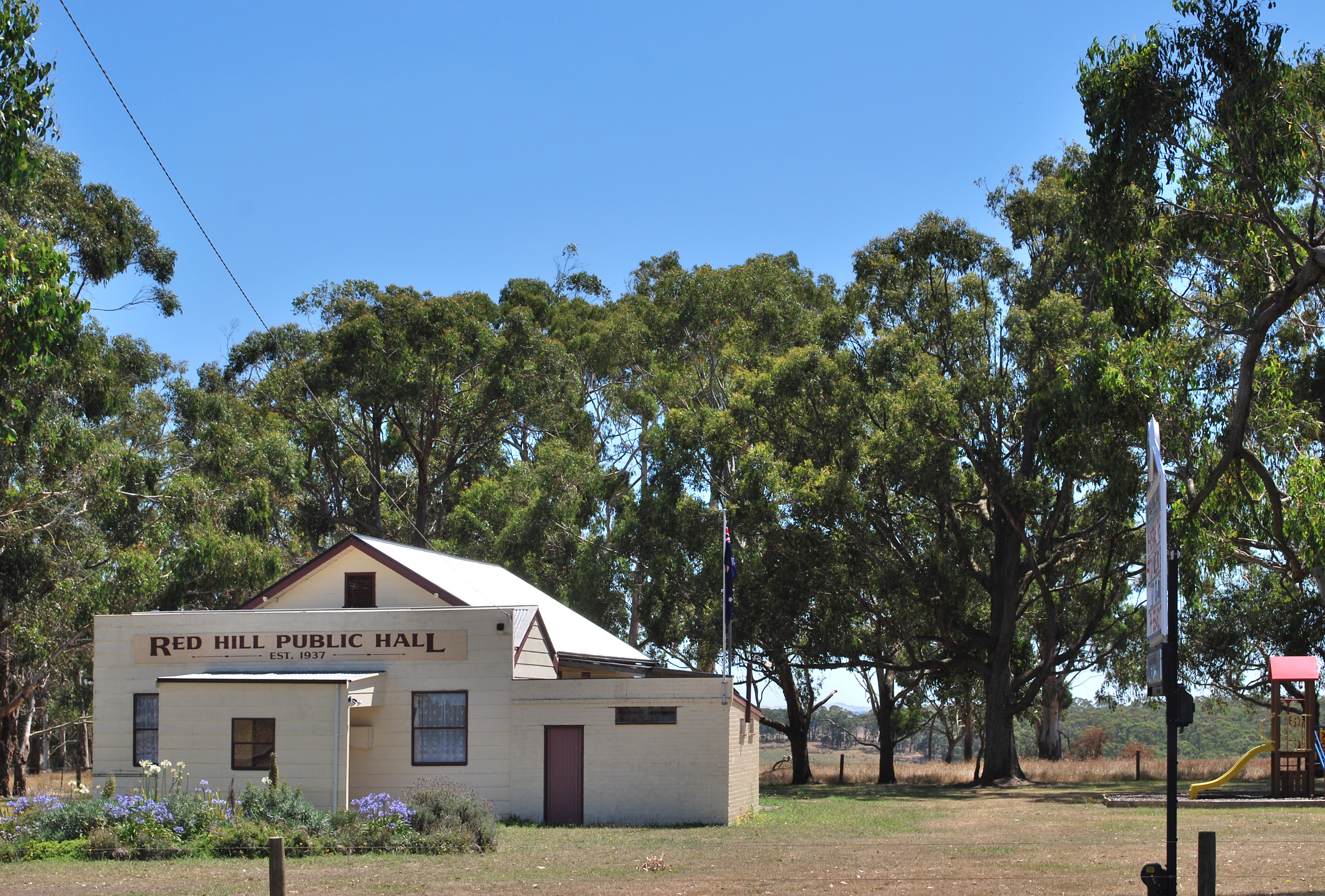
- Red Hill Public Hall, at Jancourt East

- Coordinates: 38°22′57″S 143°08′09″E
- Country: Australia
- State: Victoria
- LGA: Corangamite Shire
- Location: 203 km (126 mi) SW of Melbourne; 51 km (32 mi) W of Colac; 10 km (6.2 mi) SE of Cobden

Government
  - State electorate: Polwarth
  - Federal division: Wannon

Population
  - Total: 188 (2016 census)
- Postcode: 3266

Jancourt East is a locality in south west Victoria, Australia. The locality is in the Corangamite Shire, 203 kilometres (126 mi) south west of the state capital, Melbourne.

At the 2016 census, Jancourt East had a population of 188.

Jancourt East Primary School opened in 1913, was rebuilt in 1933, and closed on 1 January 1981. Jancourt East Post Office opened on 1 November 1938 and closed on 31 October 1967.
