= Lake Terang =

Lake in Victoria, Australia

- Location within Corangamite Shire Location within Victoria
- Location: Terang, Victoria
- Coordinates: 38°15′S 142°55′E
- Type: Dry lake
- Basin countries: Australia

Lake Terang was a lake near Terang, Victoria. Following European settlement of the area surrounding the lake in the 19th century the lake began to dry out. It was drained in the 1960s and is now used as a recreation area, for agriculture and as part of the Terang Golf Course.

The sediments of Lake Terang go back 350,000 years and are of significant interest for palaeoecology and the geologic history of western Victoria.
