= Cobrico =

Cobrico Victoria
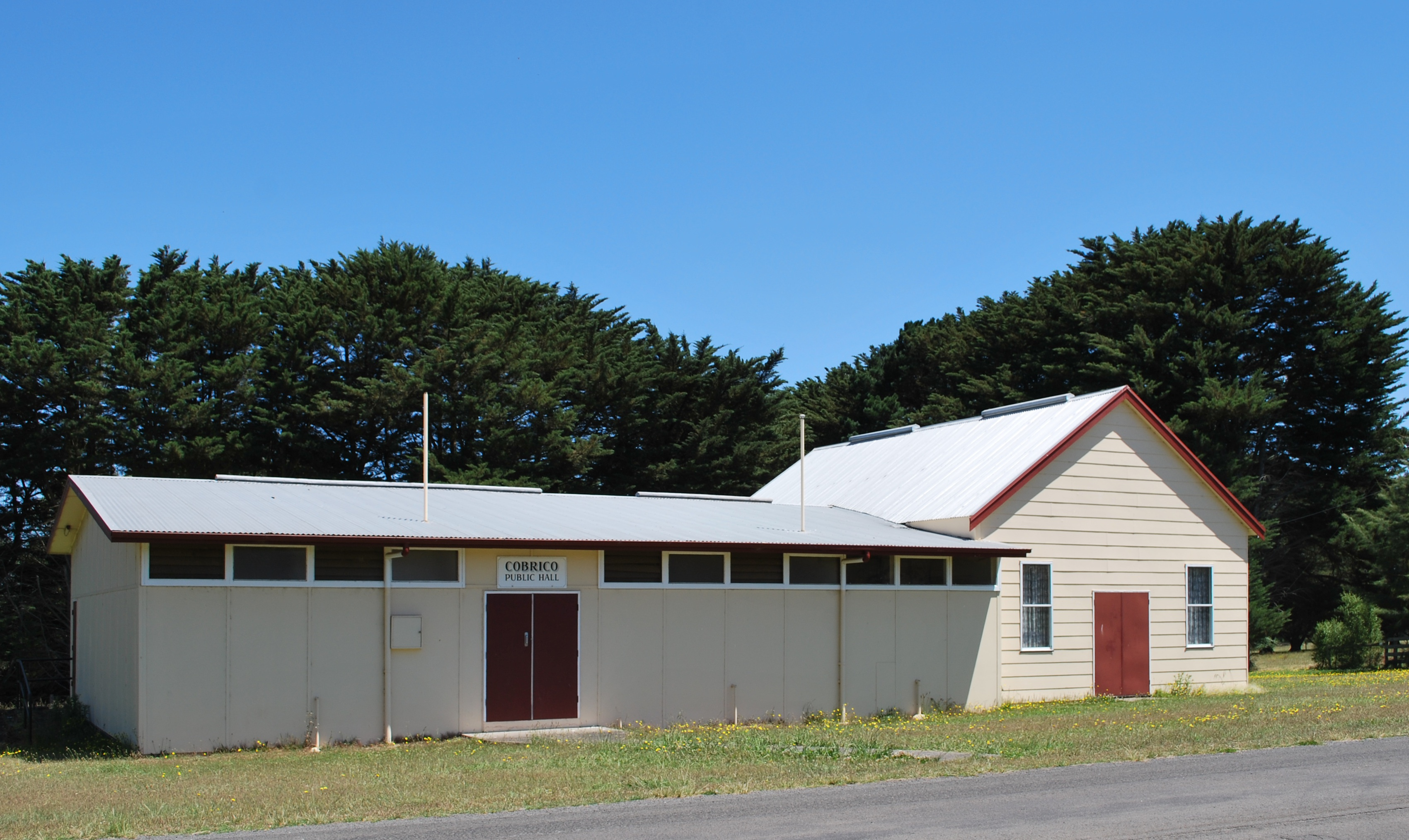
- Cobrico Public Hall

- Coordinates: 38°17′26″S 143°0′55″E
- Population: 80 (2016 census)
- Postcode(s): 3266
- LGA(s): Corangamite Shire
- State electorate(s): Polwarth
- Federal division(s): Wannon

Cobrico is a town in Victoria, Australia. The town is located in the Shire of Corangamite. At the 2016 Census, Cobrico had a population of 80.
