= Timboon Railway Shed Distillery =

- Location: Timboon, Victoria

The Timboon Railway Shed Distillery is a producer of single malt Australian whisky and liqueurs in Timboon, Victoria, Australia. The distillery takes its name from its location in the goods shed at the terminus of the former Timboon railway line.

== History ==
The distillery was opened by the owners of Timboon Fine Ice Cream, whose owners were hoping to diversify their products into year-round appeal, rather than just over summer as was the case with their ice cream. The distillery produced its first whisky in 2007. The whisky is produced from malted barley, which is brewed off-site by the Otway Estate microbrewery, then distilled at the Railway Shed in a 600-litre copper still, custom made near Hobart. The whisky is then matured in small port casks.

The town of Timboon has a local history of distilling, with an illegal still operator named Tom Delaney said to have been producing 100 gallons of "Mountain Dew" whisky a week during the 1890s, before being arrested.

== Products ==
The distillery's main product is the Timboon Single Malt, but other seasonal products include Irish cream, nocino, vodka, limoncello and apple liqueur.

== Awards ==
Timboon Single Malt received a bronze medal at the Australian Malt Whisky Awards in 2011.
