= Timboon railway line =

Former railway line in Victoria, Australia

Timboon

Overview
- Stations: 6

Service
- Type: V/Line passenger service

History
- Opened: 5 April 1892
- Closed: 8 December 1986

Technical
- Line length: 35.92 km
- Number of tracks: Single

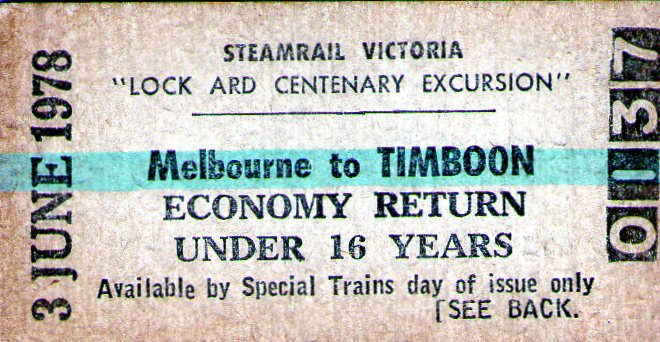
Melbourne-Timboon rail ticket 1978

The Timboon railway line is a closed railway line, in Victoria, Australia, which branched from the Port Fairy line, near Camperdown, and served the towns of Cobden and Timboon, along with the farming communities of the area.

The first sod was turned on 14 February 1889 by John Walls of Camperdown who stated that the Railway league had been lobbying for 22 years for rail into the district. The contractors, Messrs. Buscombe, Chappel & Bell took three years to complete the line. The 1916 Government Railways Standing Committee rejected the submission to extend the line to Port Campbell.

Much of the line was dismantled during 1987. All signalling and safeworking equipment at Timboon Junction were abolished by September of the same year.

The section of the line between Naroghid and Timboon has been converted into the Camperdown-Timboon Rail Trail.
