= Mingay Uniting Church =

Closed Uniting church in Mingay, Victoria, Australia

- Mingay Presbyterian Church
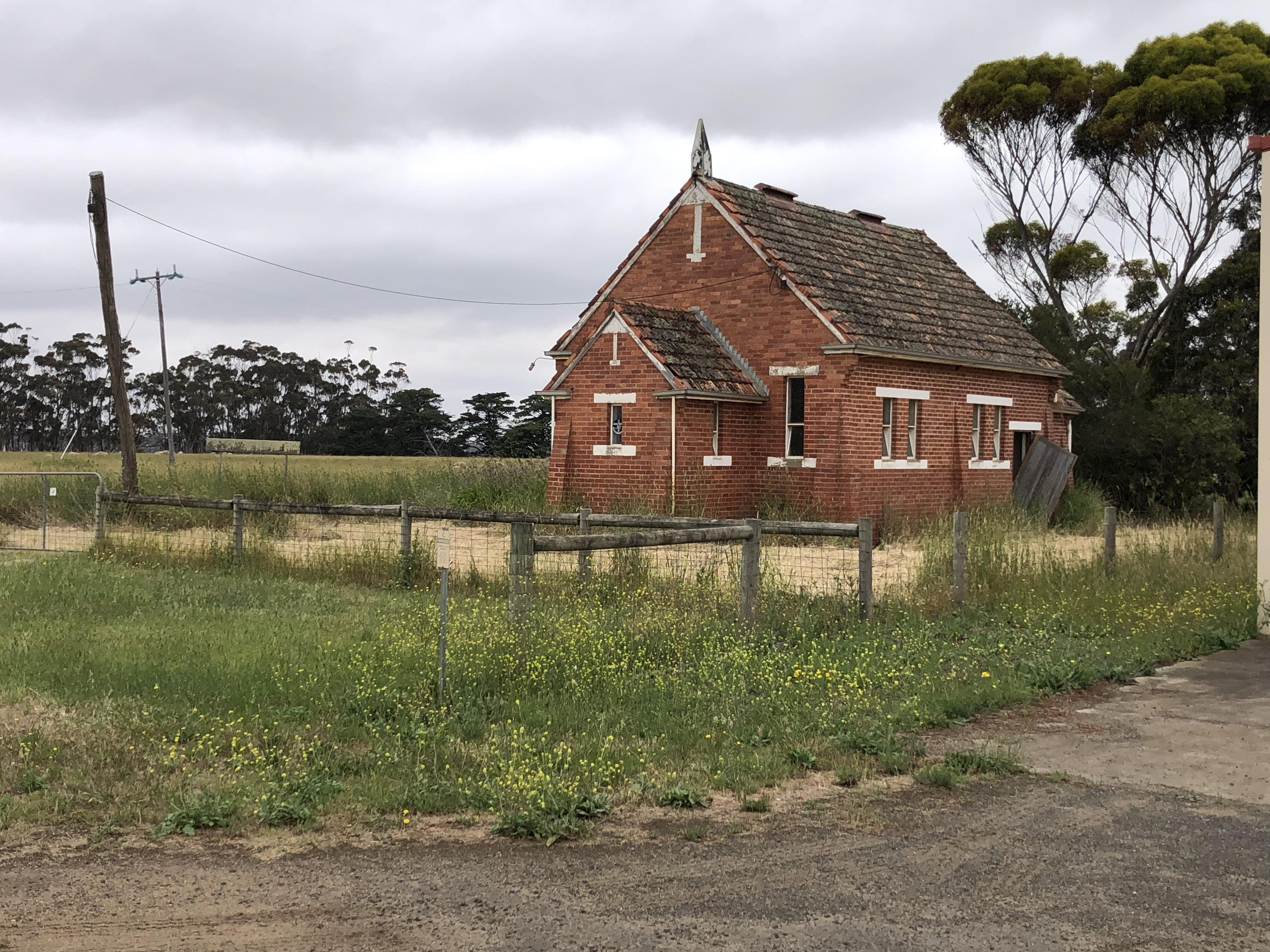
- Mingay Uniting Church
- Mingay Uniting Church
- 37.8355°S 143.3257°E
- Address: 18 Barrs Road, Mingay, Victoria
- Country: Australia
- Denomination: Uniting (since 1977)
- Previous denomination: Presbyterian

History
- Status: Closed

Architecture
- Architectural type: Church
- Years built: 1953 (current building)

Mingay Uniting Church (formerly Mingay Presbyterian Church) is a small, closed Uniting church located in the rural locality of Mingay, between the towns of Lismore and Skipton. The church, built 1953, replaced an older timber structure removed from nearby Stockyard Hill, and initially began as a Presbyterian Church until 1977, where it served as a Uniting church for its later years.

== History ==
Prior to the construction of the present church building, a timber church had been moved to the Mingay area from Stockyard Hill in 1903, after the congregation there outgrew the building and begun building a new brick church.

The Mingay Presbyterian Church had initially fallen under the Parish of Skipton until 1921, when the Parish of Derrinallum was created, resulting in a shuffling of churches into different parishes. Mingay ultimately fell under the Parish of Lismore.

On Saturday 5 September 1953, the Right Reverend W. A. Alston, the then Moderator of the Presbyterian Church of Victoria, opened the church. The church was approved by the Health Commission of the Department of Public Health later that year in December.

The church later amalgamated with the Uniting Church of Australia from its inception in 1977 until the church's later years. It is unclear when the church closed.
