= Foxhow =

Foxhow Victoria
- Coordinates: 38°03′0″S 143°29′0″E
- Population: 31 (SAL 2021)
- Postcode(s): 3323
- Location: 157 km (98 mi) from Melbourne; 84 km (52 mi) from Geelong; 73 km (45 mi) from Ballarat; 48 km (30 mi) from Colac
- LGA(s): Corangamite Shire
- State electorate(s): Polwarth
- Federal division(s): Wannon

Foxhow is a locality in Victoria, Australia, located 200 km south-west of Melbourne in an agricultural area at the northern end of Lake Corangamite.

Foxhow Post Office opened around 1902 and closed in 1959 although an earlier office had a brief existence around 1870.
