= Curdies River =

Perennial river in Victoria, Australia

Curdies
- Location of the Curdies River mouth in Victoria

Location
- Country: Australia
- State: Victoria
- Region: South East Coastal Plain (IBRA), The Otways
- Local government area: Corangamite Shire

Physical characteristics
- Source: Otway Ranges
  - location: Tandarook
  - coordinates: 38°19′17″S 143°6′38″E
  - elevation: 92 m (302 ft)
- Mouth: Great Australian Bight
  - location: Curdies Inlet, Peterborough
  - coordinates: 38°36′19″S 142°52′54″E
  - elevation: 0 m (0 ft)
- Length: 66 km (41 mi)

Basin features
- River system: Corangamite catchment
- Tributaries
  - left: Burnip Creek, Power Creek, Fenton Creek, Scotts Creek (Victoria), Spring Creek (Victoria)
  - right: Abecketts Creek
- National park: Port Campbell National Park

The Curdies River is a perennial river of the Corangamite catchment, in the Otways region of the Australian state of Victoria.

== Location and features ==
Curdies River rises below the settlement of Tandarook in southwest Victoria, east of the settlement of Cobden and flows generally south by west, joined by six minor tributaries, before reaching its river mouth in the Port Campbell National Park and emptying into the Great Australian Bight at Curdies Inlet, at the settlement of Peterborough. From its highest point, the Curdies River descends 92 metres (302 ft) over its 66-kilometre (41 mi) course.

Curdies Inlet, when full, covers an area of around 280 hectares and is located near the mouth of the Curdies River. Reasonable fishing and birdwatching can be enjoyed in the inlet.

The mouth is periodically blocked by sand. Sometimes, in order to avoid flooding around Peterborough, it has to be opened by excavation.

The river was named after the first doctor in Cobden, Daniel Curdie.

== Environmental issues ==
In April 2022, a blue-green algae outbreak started in the river. Some parts of the river turned green and emitted a strong putrid smell. Dead fish and cattle were found dead and floating in the river.

EPA Victoria investigated 25 dairy farms situated within the catchment of the River. Two of the 25 inspected farms were not taking care of their effluent properly.

The algae outbreak was because the majority of the nutrients remained and built up at the bottom of the river after entering it between July and October and being stimulated by the warmth and sunlight of the summer.

== See also ==
- List of rivers of Australia § Victoria
- Environment of Australia
