= Thomson Memorial Presbyterian Church =

Presbyterian church in Victoria, Australia

- Terang Presbyterian Church
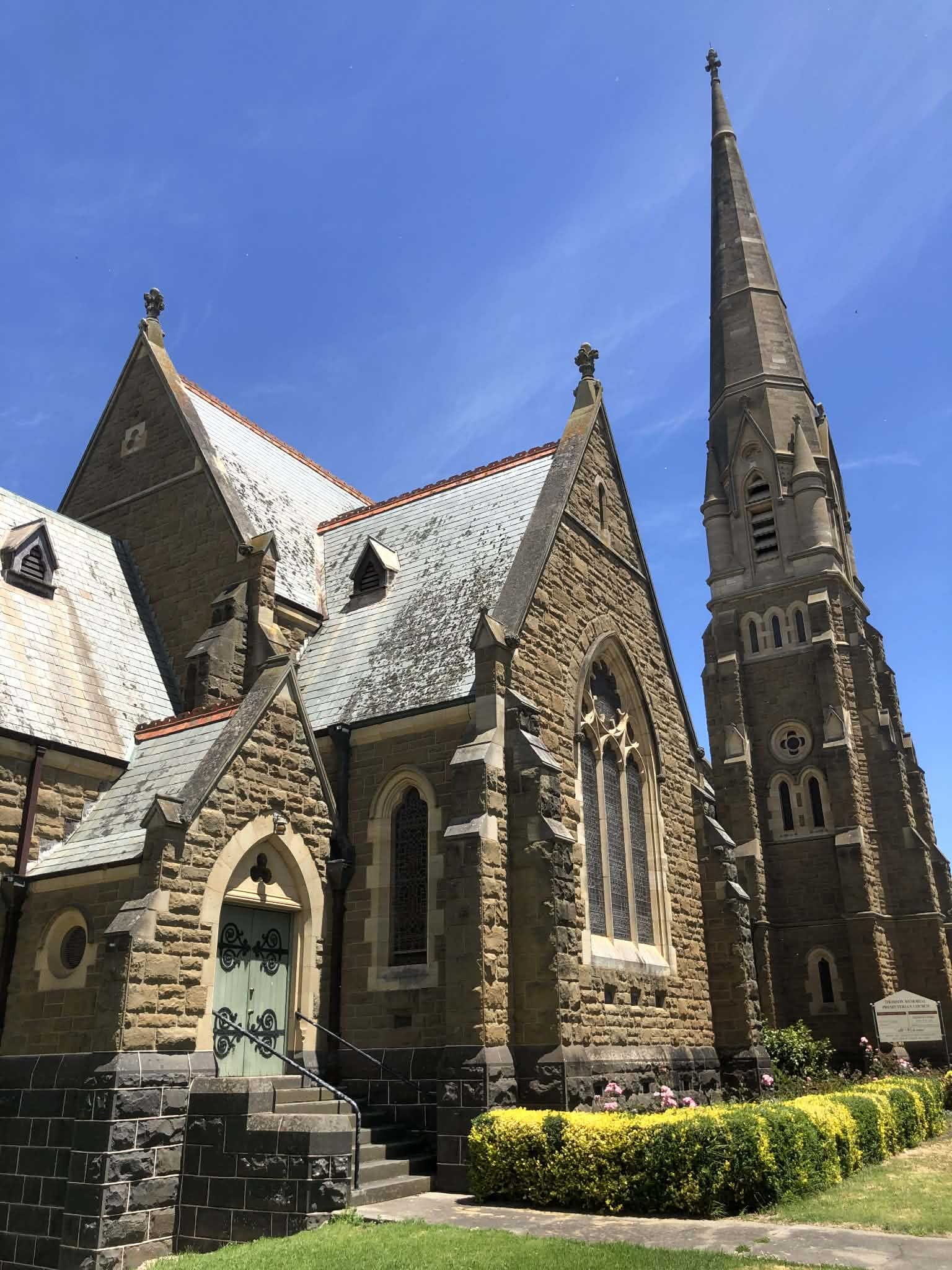
- Thomson Memorial Church, January 2, 2026
- Thomson Memorial Presbyterian Church
- 38°14′27″S 142°54′41″E
- Location: High Street, Terang, Victoria
- Country: Australia
- Denomination: Presbyterian

History
- Status: Active
- Founded: 1890
- Founder(s): John Thomson, Henrietta Thomson
- Dedication: John Thomson

Architecture
- Architect(s): Reed, Smart & Tappin
- Architectural type: Church
- Style: Gothic Revival
- Years built: 1890-1894
- Completed: 1894

Victorian Heritage Register
- Official name: Thomson Memorial Presbyterian Church
- Type: Local heritage (built and natural)
- Designated: 25 June 1969
- Reference no.: B3686

Thomson Memorial Presbyterian Church (or simply the Terang Presbyterian Church) is a large Presbyterian church situated on High Street in Terang, Victoria, Australia. Designed in the Gothic Revival style, the church is a prominent landmark in the town, noted for its tall spire and finely detailed sandstone construction. It was built as a memorial to early local pastoralist and church benefactor John Thomson and continues to serve as a place of worship within the Presbyterian tradition.

== History ==
The founding of Thomson Memorial Presbyterian Church is directly connected to John Thomson, an early pastoralist in the Western District, who arrived in the area in 1839 and established his run at Keilambete, just outside the town, in 1840. In 1890, Thomson commissioned the Melbourne architectural firm Reed, Smart & Tappin to design a new church building to replace an earlier Presbyterian church on the same site. His gift was intended to be a jubilee benefaction marking 50 years on the land, but later that year, he was killed in a buggy accident in Noorat. He did not live to see the church erected, with his widow overseeing the construction and ensured its completion be a memorial to him.

The church was opened in 1894. The design of the church included French elements (such as a semi-circular apse), and was built primarily of Barrabool and Waurn Ponds sandstone with bluestone foundations and a slate roof. Internally, original timber joinery and leadlight windows were installed.

In 1902, the church acquired a historic organ, built by Melbourne organ-builder William Anderson in 1879, originally located in the Holy Trinity Anglican Church in Kew. The organ has been rebuilt and overhauled twice, most recently in 1971, while retaining much of its original character.
