= Terang =

- Town
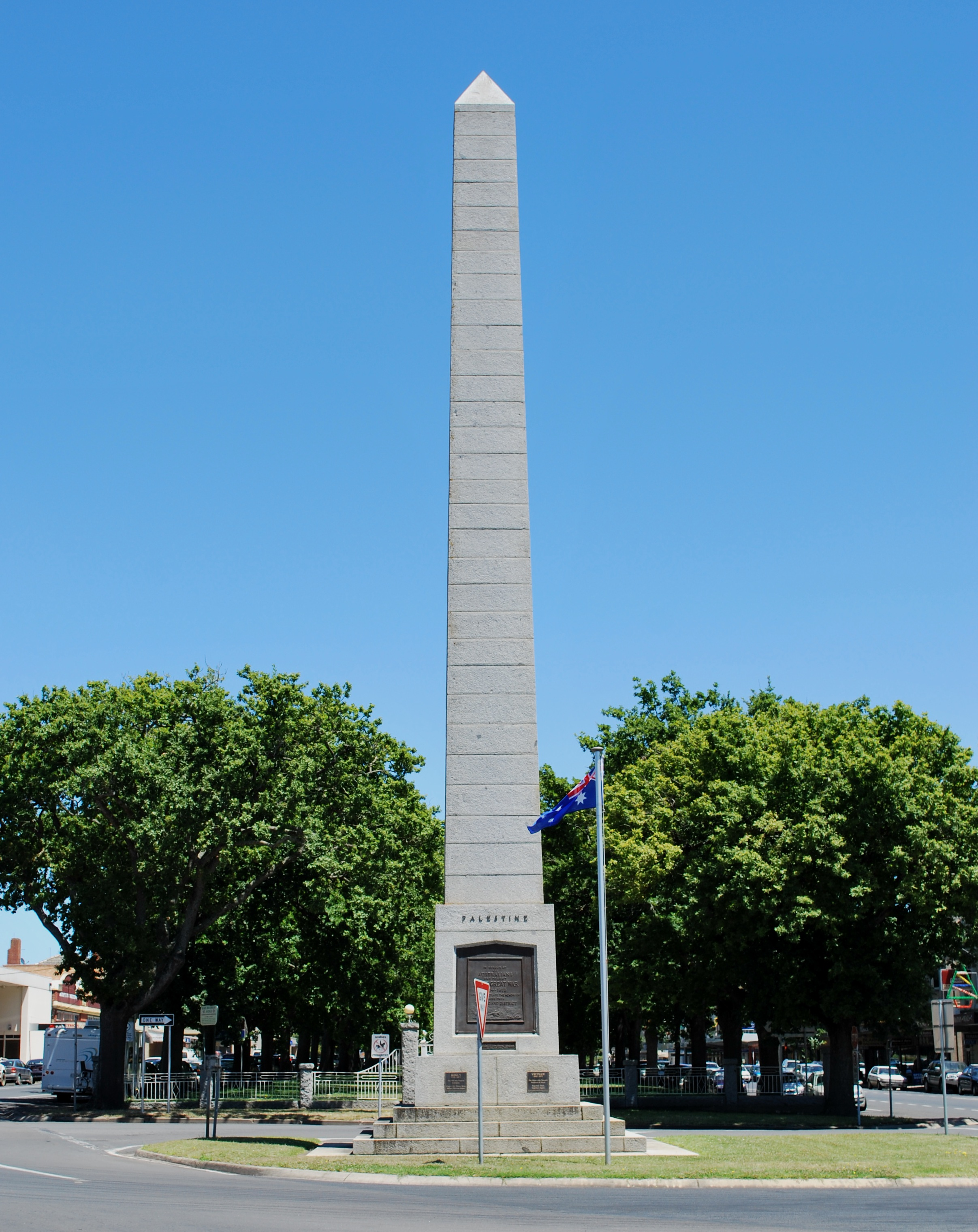
- War memorial at Terang, at the entrance to the main street

- Coordinates: 38°14′0″S 142°56′0″E
- Country: Australia
- State: Victoria
- LGA: Corangamite Shire
- Location: 215 km (134 mi) SW of Melbourne; 48 km (30 mi) NE of Warrnambool

Government
  - State electorate: Polwarth
  - Federal division: Wannon
- Elevation: 131 m (430 ft)

Population
  - Total: 2,254 (2021 census)
- Postcode: 3264
- Mean max temp: 18.5 °C (65.3 °F)
- Mean min temp: 7.7 °C (45.9 °F)
- Annual rainfall: 755.9 mm (29.76 in)

Terang /təˈræŋ/ is a town in the Shire of Corangamite, Victoria, Australia. The town is located on the Princes Highway and is 212 kilometres (132 mi) south west of the state's capital, Melbourne. At the 2021 census, Terang had a population of 2,254.

== History ==
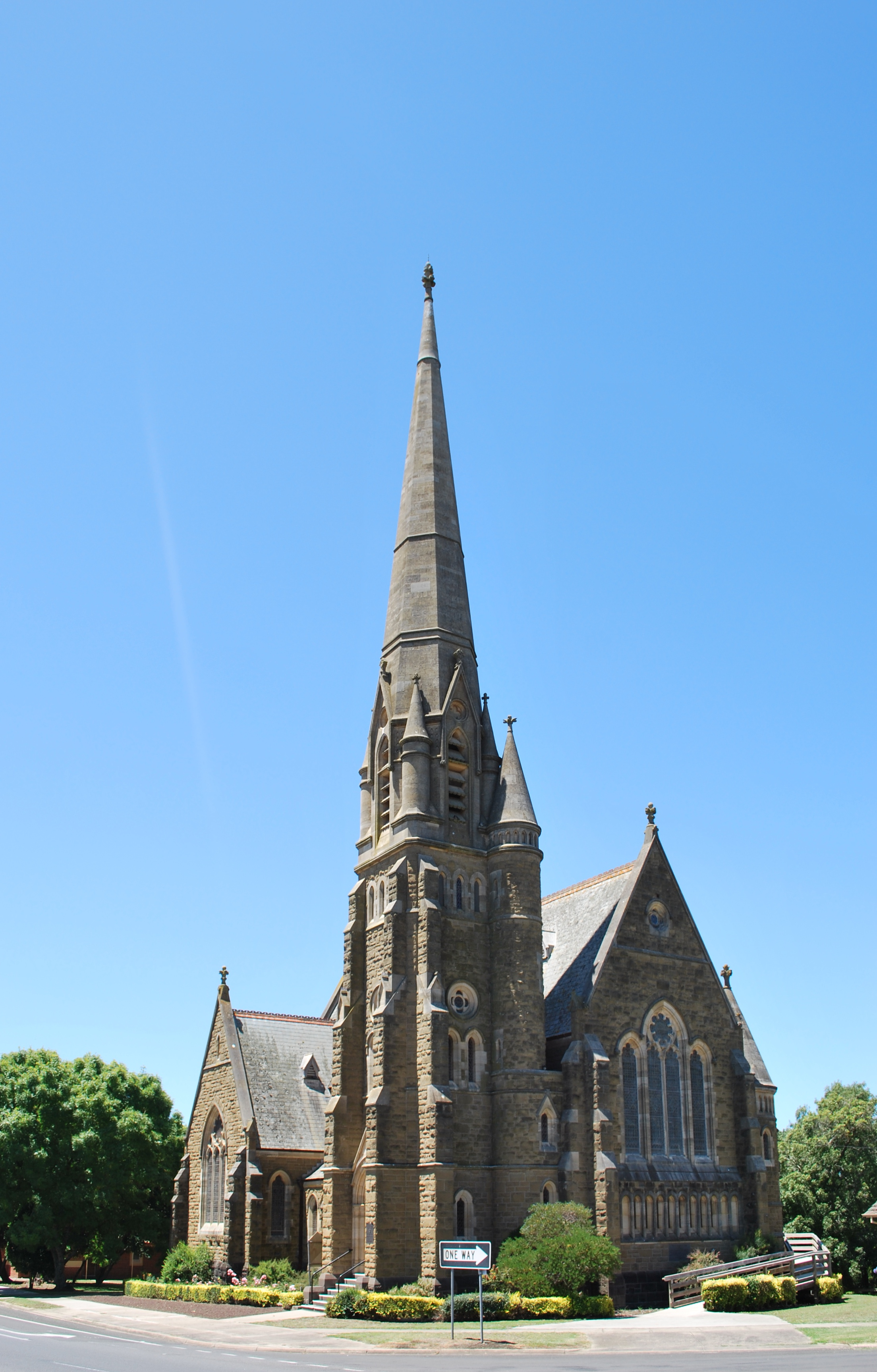
Thomson Memorial Presbyterian Church (Terang Presbyterian Church)

The semi-nomadic Kirrae Wuurong clans originally inhabited the area between Mount Emu Creek and the Hopkins River, and much of their language was recorded by a Scottish squatter, James Dawson.

The first dwelling in the township area was built in 1840 by Donald McNicol, and consisted of a slab hut on the east bank of Lake Terang. The township was developed in the late 1850s, the post office opening on 1 March 1859.

The railway though the town was opened in 1887. From 1890 it was extended as part of Victoria's south-western line. The Mortlake line once branched from the town, opened in 1893 and closed in 1978. The local railway station is served by V/Line passenger services on the Warrnambool line.

The Terang Magistrates' Court closed on 1 January 1983.

Avenues of trees were planted in the 19th century and several of these are now under the protection of the National Trust. A Heritage Trail walk points out the historic trees and many of the historic buildings and sights of the town.

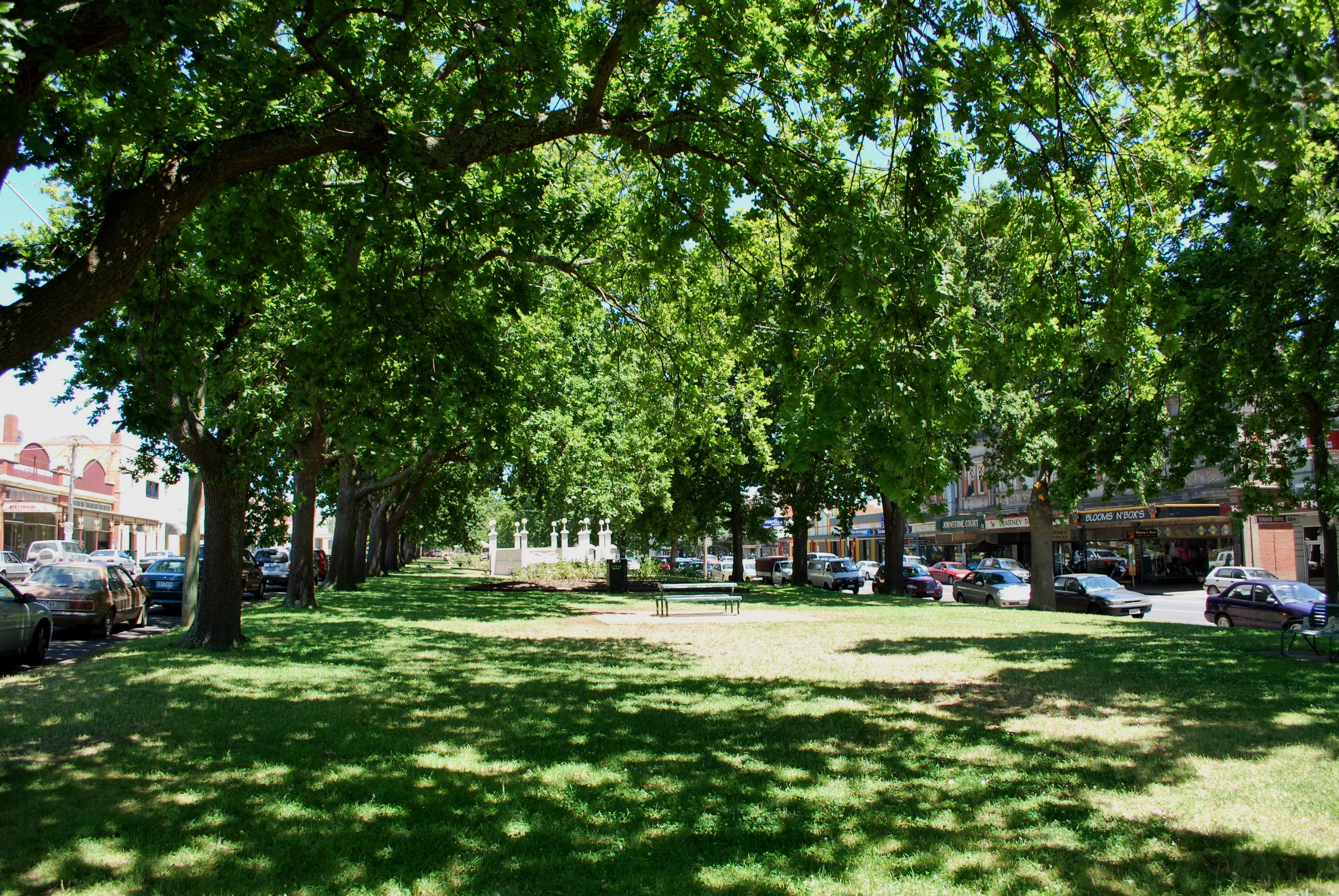
Terang main street

Features to see are the historic post office with its clock tower (1903–4), the war memorial, the rose gardens with the band rotunda, and the town's first church (Bible Christian Church c.1863). The Thomson Memorial church is also a significant local structure.

=== Lake Terang ===
Lake Terang was a lake that on its shores the town was built. To the south of the town centre is a large peat bed unique to the region. In 1933, while dry, the peat bed began burning but became a shallow lake by the 1940s. The lake was drained in the 1960s and the dried out lake floor is now used as a recreation area, for agriculture and as part of the Terang Golf Course.

=== Lake Keilambete ===
Lake Keilambete is a maar lake 4 km north of the town. The lake is a circular body 1.8 km in diameter and an average depth of 11 m. The salinity is twice that of seawater.

== Sport ==
The town has an Australian Rules football team, Terang-Mortlake, playing in the Hampden Football League.

Terang has a horse racing club, the Terang & District Racing Club, which schedules around eight race meetings a year including the Terang Cup meeting in October.

Terang Harness Racing Club conducts regular meetings at its racetrack in the town.

Golfers play on the 18-hole golf course at the Terang Golf Club on High Street at the western entrance to the town.

== Education ==
Terang College is a school, established in 1848 as Terang Primary School. It educates more than 400 students from Prep to Year 12. It has two campuses: one on the western (Warrnambool) side of the town; the other on Strong Street near Cobden Road. The western campus houses years Prep to Grade 4 while the Cobden Road Campus has Years 5–12.

== Climate ==
Terang has a moderate oceanic climate (Cfb) with warm summers, albeit with cool nights, and chilly damp winters.

Climate data for Terang
Month	Jan	Feb	Mar	Apr	May	Jun	Jul	Aug	Sep	Oct	Nov	Dec	Year
Record high °C (°F)	41.2 (106.2)	40.6 (105.1)	38.9 (102.0)	32.8 (91.0)	25.6 (78.1)	19.4 (66.9)	20.5 (68.9)	22.2 (72.0)	25.6 (78.1)	29.4 (84.9)	36.7 (98.1)	37.8 (100.0)	41.2 (106.2)
Mean daily maximum °C (°F)	25.0 (77.0)	25.3 (77.5)	22.9 (73.2)	18.7 (65.7)	15.4 (59.7)	12.8 (55.0)	12.3 (54.1)	13.3 (55.9)	15.5 (59.9)	17.7 (63.9)	20.0 (68.0)	22.8 (73.0)	18.5 (65.3)
Mean daily minimum °C (°F)	10.8 (51.4)	11.6 (52.9)	10.4 (50.7)	8.4 (47.1)	6.7 (44.1)	4.6 (40.3)	4.1 (39.4)	4.7 (40.5)	5.8 (42.4)	7.0 (44.6)	8.2 (46.8)	9.6 (49.3)	7.7 (45.9)
Record low °C (°F)	4.6 (40.3)	5.0 (41.0)	2.2 (36.0)	1.7 (35.1)	0.0 (32.0)	−2.2 (28.0)	−2.4 (27.7)	−1.7 (28.9)	0.0 (32.0)	−1.1 (30.0)	2.2 (36.0)	3.6 (38.5)	−2.4 (27.7)
Average rainfall mm (inches)	39.9 (1.57)	37.0 (1.46)	47.8 (1.88)	63.3 (2.49)	74.4 (2.93)	77.9 (3.07)	83.1 (3.27)	91.9 (3.62)	80.2 (3.16)	71.5 (2.81)	60.7 (2.39)	49.9 (1.96)	777.3 (30.60)
Average rainy days (≥ 1.0 mm)	5.3	4.7	6.3	8.7	11.2	11.8	13.5	14.0	12.4	10.9	8.5	7.3	114.6
Source: Australian Bureau of Meteorology

== Notable citizens ==
- John Robertson Duigan MC, the pioneer aviator who built and flew the first Australian-made aircraft, was born in Terang in 1882.
- Tom Skeyhill, Gallipoli campaign veteran and biographer of Sergeant Alvin York WW1 Medal of Honor recipient, was born in Terang in 1895.
- The Australian immunologist and Nobel laureate Frank Macfarlane Burnet grew up in Terang, whilst his father was a bank manager.
- Author, business advisor and media commentator Bernard Salt was born in Terang and attended Terang High School.
- AFL footballer and Essendon premiership player Chris Heffernan.
- Footscray footballer Dick Wearmouth.
- Collingwood footballer and four-time grand finalist Ronnie Wearmouth.
- Melbourne footballer Jordie McKenzie.
- The Standardbred racehorse Gammalite, who was the first Standardbred to win A$1 million in Australia.
- Ten Eyewitness News news presenter Candice Wyatt.
- James MacKinnon, cricketer.
- Adam Harvey, country music singer.
- Con Chrisoulis, academic and graphic novel biographer of David Bowie and the Smiths, was born in Terang.

== See also ==
- Lake Terang
- Marida Yallock
- Terang railway station
