= Brucknell, Victoria =

Brucknell Victoria
- Coordinates: 38.4690°S 142.9086°E
- Population: 127 (SAL 2021)
- Postcode(s): 3268
- LGA(s): Corangamite Shire; Shire of Moyne
- State electorate(s): Polwarth
- Federal division(s): Wannon

Brucknell is a locality in the Western District of Victoria, Australia. It is located in the Shire of Corangamite and Moyne.

== Traditional ownership ==
The formally recognised traditional owners for the area in which Brucknell sits are the Eastern Maar People who are represented by the Eastern Maar Aboriginal Corporation.

== Post offices ==
The original Brucknell post office opened around 1902 and closed on 1 July 1916. The next Brucknell post office, originally Brucknell South, opened on 1 July 1907 and closed on 30 November 1957.
