= Heytesbury Settlement Scheme =

Simpson
- Town
- Coordinates: 38°29′0″S 143°12′0″E
- Country: Australia
- State: Victoria
- LGAs: Corangamite Shire; Colac Otway Shire
- Established: 1952

Population
  - Total: 569 (2016 census)
- Postcode: 3266

The Heytesbury Settlement Scheme was a soldier settlement scheme established in the Western District of Victoria, Australia after World War II. The scheme involved the clearing of the Heytesbury Forest south of Colac, Victoria and adjacent to the Otway Ranges to allow for the establishment of a dairy industry in the area. Established in 1960 by the Victorian Government led by Premier Henry Bolte, some early problems saw the scheme dismissed as "Bolte's Blunder". In time the area became one of Australia's most productive dairy regions. The scheme was one of the last large scale land settlement schemes in Victoria.

The town of Simpson—named for Les Simpson, the first chair of the Soldier Settlement Commission—was established as part of the scheme.
