= Daniel Curdie =

Australian medical doctor and founder of Victorian town, Cobden

Doctor Daniel Curdie
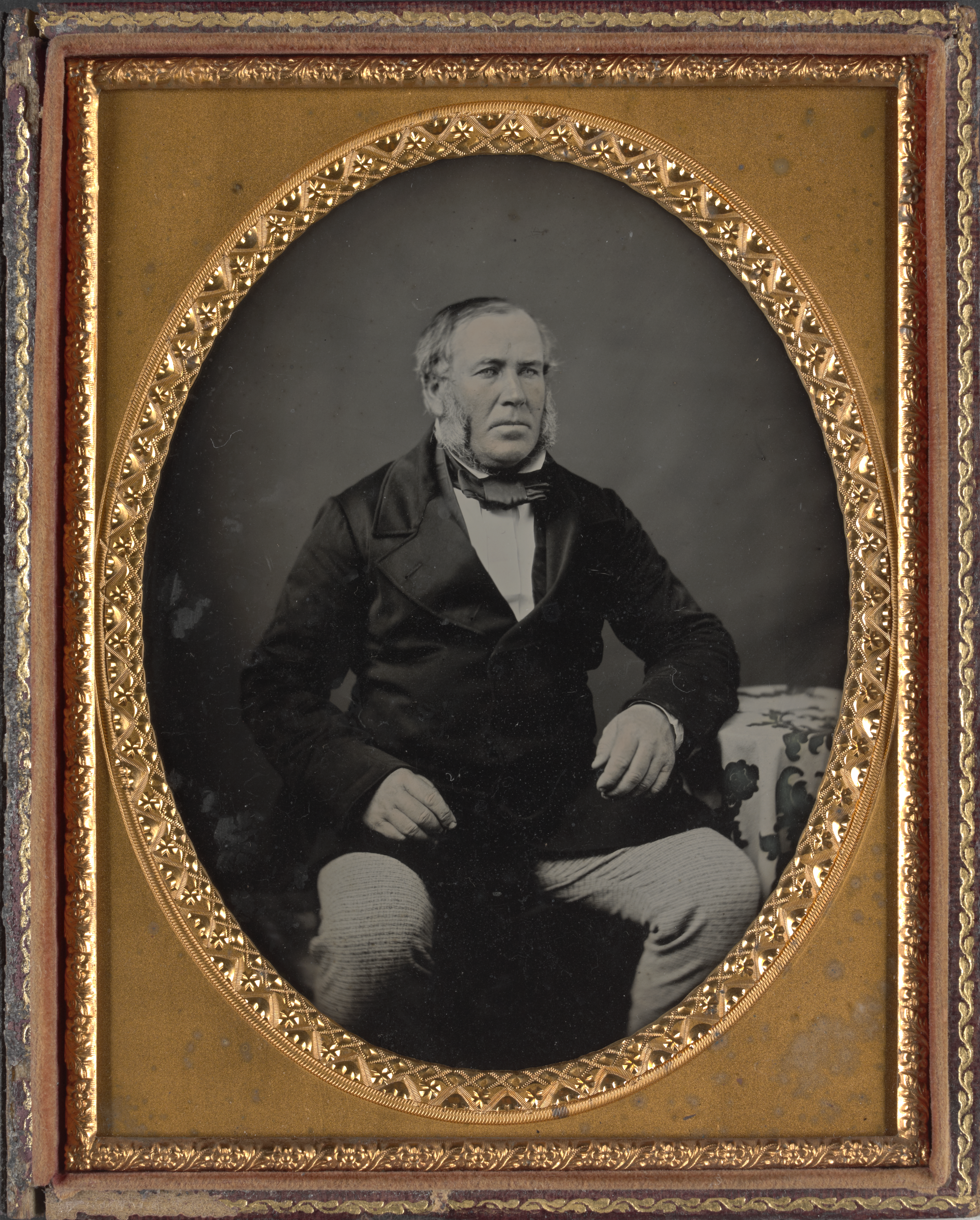
- Portrait of Daniel Curdie ca. 1850-ca. 1870.
- Born: January 9, 1810; Slidderie, Arran, Scotland
- Died: February 22, 1884 (aged 74)
- Scientific career
- Fields: Botany, algaeology.

Daniel Curdie (1810-1884) was an early Australian pioneer who founded the Victorian town of Cobden. He was a doctor of medicine and protector of the local Indigenous people. He helped develop the pastoral industry in the Heytesbury area.

== Early life ==
Curdie was the sixth son born at Slidderie, Arran, Scotland, to Daniel MacCurdy and Mary McKinnon in 1810. He was primarily schooled in the town of Ayr, and took his M.A. degree at Glasgow in 1832; then proceeding to Edinburgh, where he graduated in 1838 as a doctor.

== Squatter and Doctor ==
In 1839 he boarded the ship Caledonia and sailed to Australia, arriving in Sydney on the 29 September 1839. The buzz around the Major Mitchell extradition where Mitchell had recently discovered Australia Felix, inspired Curdie and his nephew, Daniel McKinnon, travel overland to the Port Phillip district.

Leaving Melbourne, Curdie with his stock and supplies headed west secured land to the south of Camperdown. Curdie named his homestead at "Tandarook". "Tandarook," in aboriginal language, signifies a place where the "native bread " fungus Laccocephalum mylittae is to be found. The Curdies River rises near his homestead and is named after him. In 1845 he made the difficult journey down the river to its mouth. He named the area Peterborough after his friend Peter Reid of Richmond.

Curdie, overcome by its beauty, christened the area Lovely Banks. When the town was surveyed in 1861 the area had to be renamed because there was already a place named Lovely Banks in west Geelong. It was decided to call the town Cobden after Richard Cobden (1804–65), an English Parliamentarian and advocate of free trade.

For 11 years Curdie combined squatting with the practice of his profession. He was distinguished by his humane treatment in his dealings with the blacks, who often resorted to Tandarook as a place of safety during their tribal quarrels. These quarrels were frequent and bloody, and those that survived were taken care of by Curdie. He was regarded far and wide as the natural protector of the blacks.

In 1851 he returned to Scotland for to study botany and returned home three years later to Tandarook with a wife.

== Botanist ==
He was an enterprising pastoralist, who unselfishly devoted time and means to many objects for the public good. After the Local Government Act came into force, he served for some years in the Hampden Shire Council. He lobbied the Victorian Government for the construction of the rail line from Geelong to Warrnambool. He was a founder of Geelong College.

Curdie frequently exchanged letters with Ferdinand von Mueller, the Victorian Government Botanist, Mueller would often visited "Tandarook."

Curdie was a member of the Government expedition sent to observe the total eclipse at Cape York in 1872. trip enabled him to study sea-weeds under favourable conditions; this was the branch of botany to which he devoted special attention.

Curdie died on 22 February 1884 leaving a wife and 10 children.

There is a monument to him in the main street of Camperdown.
