= Shire of Corangamite =

Coordinates: 38°14′00″S 143°09′00″E

- Local government area
- Location in Victoria

- Interactive map of Shire of Corangamite
- Country: Australia
- State: Victoria
- Region: Barwon South West
- Established: 1994
- Council seat: Camperdown

Government
  - Mayor: Cr Kate Makin
  - State electorates: Polwarth; Ripon; South-West Coast
  - Federal division: Wannon

Area
  - Total: 4,408 km^{2} (1,702 sq mi)

Population
  - Total: 16,115 (2021)
  - Density: 3.6559/km^{2} (9.4686/sq mi)
- Gazetted: 23 September 1994
- Website: Shire of Corangamite
LGAs around Shire of Corangamite
Ararat	Pyrenees	Golden Plains
Moyne	Shire of Corangamite	Colac Otway
Southern Ocean	Southern Ocean	Southern Ocean

The Shire of Corangamite is a local government area in the Barwon South West region of Victoria, Australia, located in the south-western part of the state. It covers an area of 4,408 square kilometres (1,702 mi^{2}) and in 2021 had a population of 16,115. It includes the towns of Camperdown, Terang, Cobden, Timboon, Port Campbell and Skipton.

The Shire is governed and administered by the Corangamite Shire Council; its seat of local government and administrative centre is located at the council headquarters in Camperdown. The Shire is named after the major geographical feature in the region, Lake Corangamite, which is located on the eastern boundary of the LGA.

== History ==
The Shire of Corangamite came into existence on 23 September 1994 from the amalgamation of the Town of Camperdown, the vast bulk of the Shire of Hampden and the Shire of Heytesbury, the Simpson and Princetown districts of the Shire of Otway, and small parts of the Shire of Mortlake and Shire of Warrnambool around Lake Keilambete.

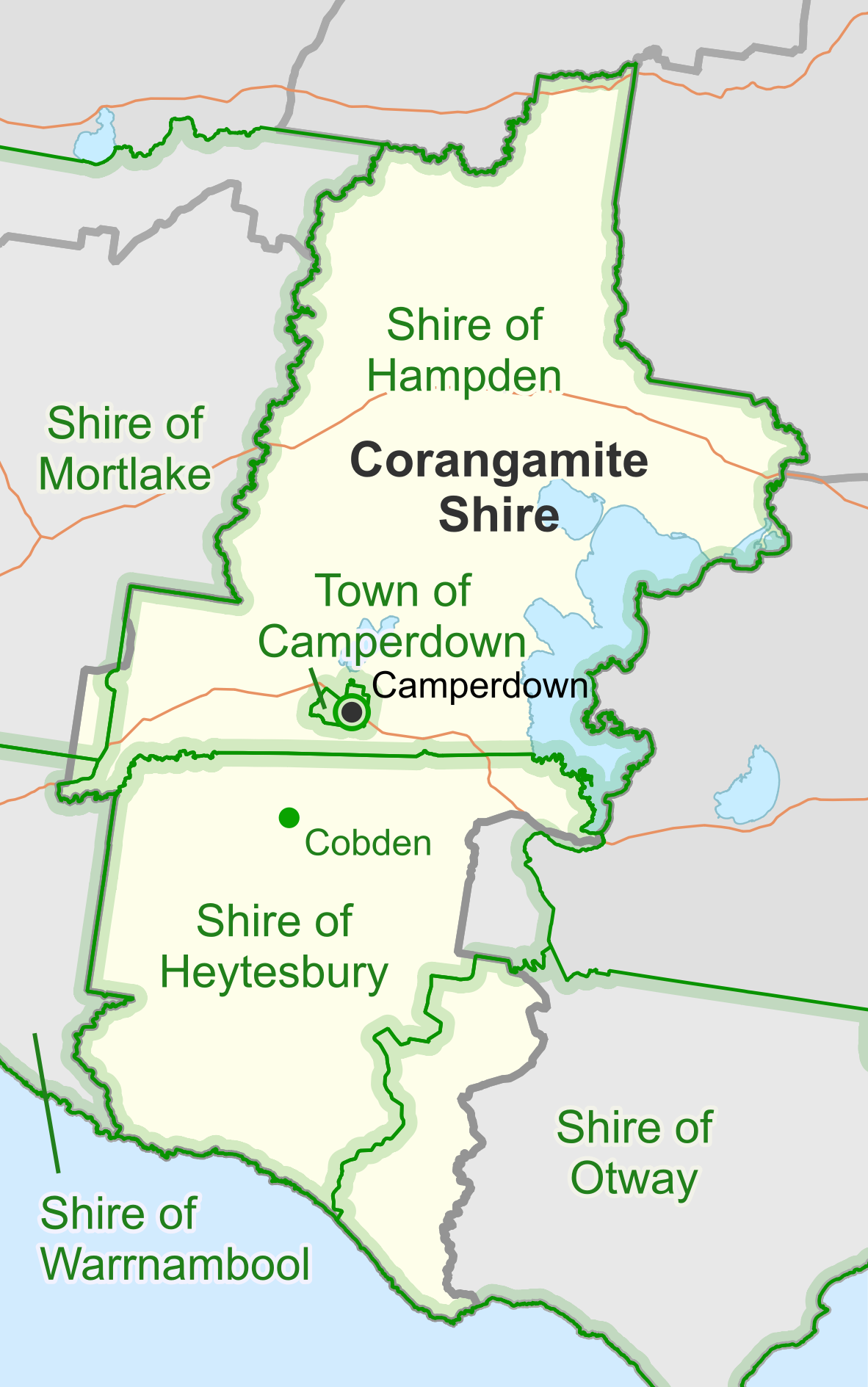
A map of Corangamite Shire showing the predecessor LGAs that overlapped the area before the 1994 local government amalgamations

== Council ==
=== Current composition ===
The council is composed of seven wards and seven councillors, with one councillor elected to represent each ward.

Ward	Party	Councillor	Notes
Lake Keilambete	Independent	Geraldine Conheady	
Gnotuk	Independent	Ruth Gstrein	
Leura	Independent	Laurie Hickey	
Cooriemungle	Independent	Jamie Vogels	
Mount Elephant	Independent	Nicholas Cole	
Tandarook	Independent	Joanne Beard	
Elingamite	Independent	Kate Makin	

=== Administration and governance ===
The Council meets at the Killara Centre in Camperdown while its main Council offices are located at 181 Manifold Street.

== Townships and localities ==
In the 2021 census, the shire had a population of 16,115, compared to 16,051 in the 2016 census.

Population
Locality	2016	2021
Ayrford^	44	39
Berrybank^	40	37
Bookaar	163	159
Boorcan	146	142
Bostocks Creek	83	85
Bradvale	59	46
Brucknell^	116	127
Bullaharre	17	19
Camperdown	3,369	3,354
Carlisle River^	135	168
Carpendeit^	134	115
Chapple Vale^	36	42
Chocolyn	67	61
Cobden	1,839	1,804
Cobrico	80	72
Cooriemungle	364	311
Cowleys Creek	37	34
Cressy^	175	176
Cundare North^	9	10
Curdies River	28	25
Curdievale^	124	125
Darlington^	107	84
Derrinallum	415	386
Dixie	131	148
Duverney	33	23
Ecklin South^	188	222
Elingamite	55	57
Elingamite North	78	118
Foxhow	19	31
Garvoc^	243	248
Gellibrand Lower^	13	19
Glenfyne	135	131
Glenormiston North^	56	63
Glenormiston South	108	123
Gnotuk	99	120
Heytesbury Lower	52	39
Jancourt	29	16
Jancourt East^	188	185
Kariah	94	94
Kennedys Creek	42	44
Koallah	29	28
Kolora^	142	188
Larralea	*	#
Leslie Manor	64	66
Lismore	420	472
Mingay	51	44
Mount Bute^	58	61
Naroghid	71	66
Newfield	69	59
Nirranda East^	14	12
Noorat^	333	318
Noorat East	20	17
Paaratte	31	36
Peterborough^	247	322
Pirron Yallock^	113	132
Pittong^	15	12
Pomborneit	62	73
Pomborneit East	25	42
Pomborneit North	71	48
Port Campbell	478	440
Princetown	241	236
Scotts Creek	248	214
Simpson^	569	583
Skibo	65	70
Skipton^	586	609
South Purrumbete	109	124
Stonyford^	51	65
Tandarook	19	46
Taroon^	22	25
Terang^	2,288	2,254
Tesbury	112	110
Timboon	1,202	1,250
Timboon West	54	57
Vite Vite	39	37
Vite Vite North	28	32
Waarre	15	0
Wattle Hill	6	11
Weerite	117	121
Werneth^	60	66

^ - Territory divided with another LGA
* - Not noted in 2016 Census
# - Not noted in 2021 Census

== See also ==
- List of localities in Victoria (Australia)
- List of places of worship in Corangamite Shire
