= Timboon =

- Town
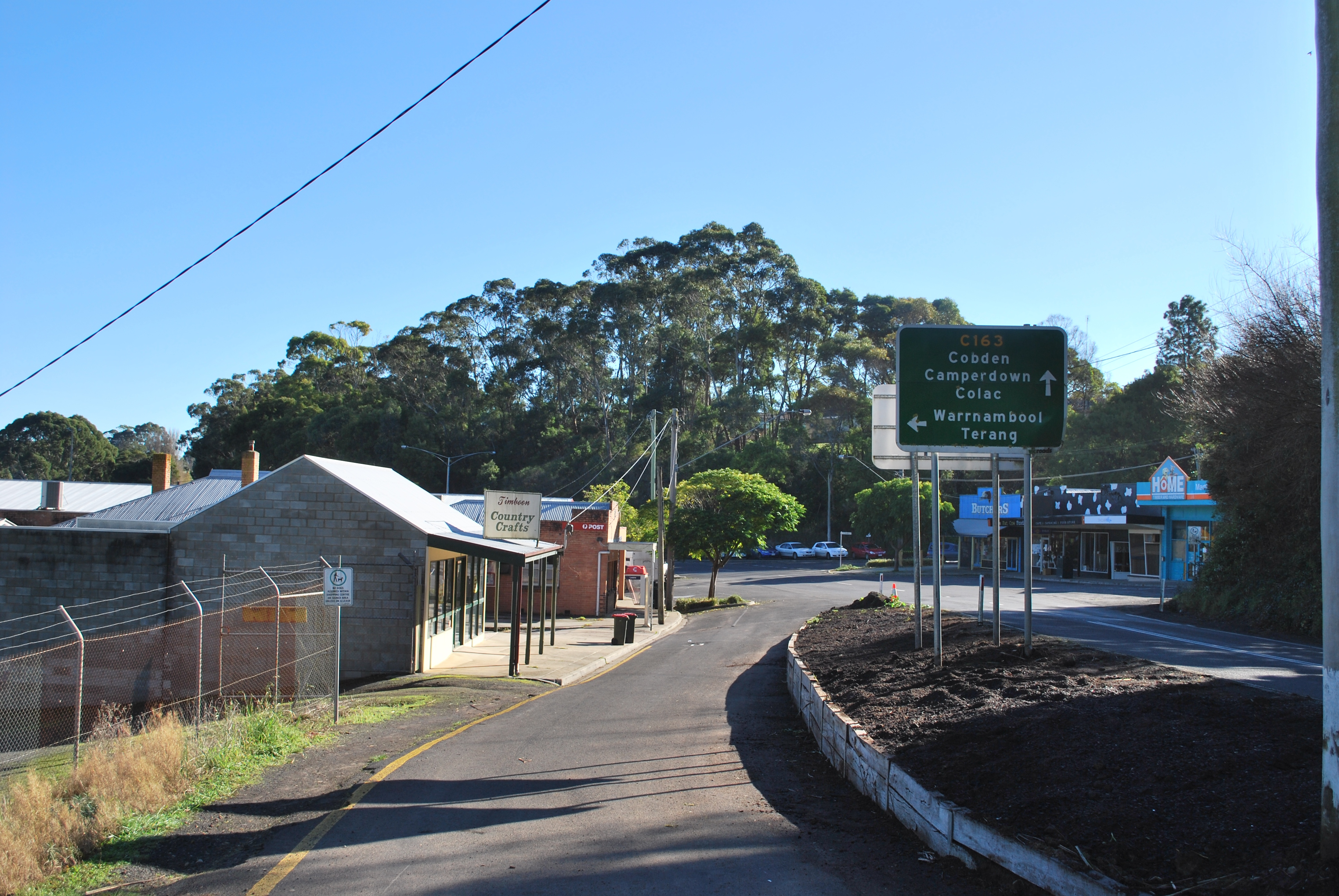
- Entering Timboon from the Port Campbell road

- Coordinates: 38°29′0″S 142°58′0″E
- Country: Australia
- State: Victoria
- LGA: Corangamite Shire
- Location: 213 km (132 mi) SW of Melbourne; 53 km (33 mi) E of Warrnambool; 17 km (11 mi) N of Port Campbell

Government
  - State electorate: Polwarth
  - Federal division: Wannon

Area
  - Total: 1.97 km^{2} (0.76 sq mi)

Population
  - Total: 1,250 (2021 census)
  - Density: 635/km^{2} (1,643/sq mi)
- Postcode: 3268

Timboon /tɪmˈbuːn, ˈtɪmbən/ is a town in the Western District of Victoria, Australia. The town is in the Shire of Corangamite local government area, located approximately 213 kilometres (132 mi) south-west of the state capital, Melbourne. In the 2021 census, Timboon had a population of 830 people.

The main industries within the region are dairying, forestry, and lemon and lime farming.

== History ==
Prior to the arrival of Europeans, the area was inhabited by people from the Girawurung Aboriginal language group. It is believed that the Timboon's name comes from the local Aboriginal word 'timboun' which was a word used to describe pieces of rock used to open mussels.

The first white man in the area was Daniel Curdie. In 1845 he followed the river that bears his name to its mouth at Peterborough. The river flowed through thick forest at the time. The first settlers to move into the area were the Callaways. They were English immigrants who selected land in the Heytesbury Forest in 1875. They had to clear the forest to the west and north of the present township. A small settlement on the banks of the Curdies River that never developed called Curdies River was the original destination for a proposed railway.

A more suitable site was chosen in 1877 on the banks of Powers Creek was known as “New Timboon”. "Old Timboon" was the site of the original Camperdown township. The town began to grow as new settlers were attracted to the area. The first school opened in 1883. By 1889 the township of “New Timboon” offered land for sale confident of the coming of the railway to the area. The town had a general store, butcher and blacksmiths by 1891. In 1892 the 3 year construction of the Timboon branch line was concluded.

The first major produce of the area was timber, the train would carry the timber out and return with all the provision a township would require. As the country opened up, dairy farming became popular, and the production of milk, cheese and butter are still central to the local economy. There is still substantial lemon and lime farming.

The Timboon railway line that opened in 1892 was closed in 1986. The railway line featured several trestle bridges including the now restored Timboon Trestle bridge. The Timboon to Camperdown rail trail now follows the old route taken by the railway. The local railway station that closed along with the railway and the building is now home to a distillery. The Post Office in the township opened on 7 March 1887. Two earlier offices named Timboon were opened near Camperdown, the first one operated from 1849 to 1852, the second after the town relocated, opening in 1853, was renamed Camperdown in 1854.

The Heytesbury Forest east of Timboon underwent clearing for additional dairy farms during 1928 to 1933, and later from 1956 to 1975 the Heytesbury Settlement Scheme released 43,000 hectares on which 378 farms were established. The Cobden butter and cheese factory opened a branch at Timboon in 1950. A hospital was opened in 1955, and a high school in 1960.

== Demographics ==
In the 2001 census, Timboon had a population of 787, 53.2% female and 46.8% male. 88.8% of people living in Timboon were born in Australia. The other top responses were England 3.3%, Netherlands 1.5%, New Zealand 1.0%, Iran 0.4% and Canada 0.4%. 95.8% of people spoke English at home; the next-most common languages were 0.6% Netherlandic and 0.4% Persian.

In the 2006 census, Timboon had a population of 871, 53.2% female and 46.8% male. The median age of the Timboon population was 42 years, 5 years above the national median of 37. 88.9% of people living in Timboon were born in Australia. The other top responses were England 3.3%, Netherlands 2.1%, New Zealand 0.7%, Philippines 0.6% and Northern Ireland 0.3%. 95.4% of people spoke English at home; the next-most common language was Dutch at 1.1%.

In the 2011 census, Timboon had a population of 743, 52.6% female and 47.4% male. The median age of the Timboon population was 43 years, 6 years above the national median of 37. 88.4% of people living in Timboon were born in Australia. The other top responses were New Zealand 2.6%, England 2.3%, Netherlands 1.6%, South Africa 0.9% and Samoa 0.5%. 94.8% of people spoke English at home; the next-most common languages were 0.9% Samoan, 0.4% Afrikaans, 0.4% Italian and 0.4% Indonesian.

In the 2016 census, Timboon had a population of 796, 50.7% female and 49.3% male. The median age of the Timboon population was 48 years, 10 years above the national median of 38. 87.1% of people living in Timboon were born in Australia. The other top responses were England 2.2%, New Zealand 1.7%, Netherlands 1.0%, Bulgaria 0.4% and the Philippines 0.4%. 92.2% of people spoke English at home; the next-most common languages were 0.5% Mandarin and 0.4% Bulgarian.

In the 2021 census, Timboon had a population of 830, 49.5% female and 50.5% male. The median age of the Timboon population was 50 years, 12 years above the national median of 38. 85.4% of people living in Timboon were born in Australia. The other top responses were England 3.0%, New Zealand 1.2%, Netherlands 0.7%, China (excludes SARs and Taiwan) 0.7% and the Philippines 0.6%. 89.6% of people spoke English at home; the next-most common languages were 0.5% Russian, 0.5% Mandarin and 0.4% Ukrainian.

== Amenities ==
Children from the district attend Timboon P-12 School, previously known as Timboon Consolidated School. During heavy winters, the road to the bridge floods over.

The town has a number of small businesses including an IGA Supermarket, Home Timber & Hardware store, post office, chemist, newsagent, clothing stores, a baker, hairdresser, a National Australia Bank branch, and a laundromat. There are also a few local farming-related businesses that provide the local farmers with their services.

There are two churches in Timboon located near the school. Another, the Anglican church, is on the corner of Barrett and Church streets on the other side of the town.

The former railway station goods shed was renovated and reopened in mid-2008 as a restaurant, which also houses a whisky distillery under the name Timboon Railway Shed Distillery. This put the station into use for the first time since being previously used as a Guide Hall. The former station site also marks one end of the Camperdown-Timboon Rail Trail.

=== Sports ===
The Timboon Demons are an Australian rules football and netball club, playing in the Warrnambool & District Football League. The club was created when Heytesbury Demons and Timboon Saints merged in late 2002.

Golfers play at the course of the Timboon Golf Club on Egan Street. Timboon has a park run that takes place every Saturday morning at 8 am. The Corangamite Lions soccer team based out of the Scott's Creek recreation reserve also draws from the area.

== Notable People from Timboon ==
- Paul Couch - VFL/AFL footballer for Geelong and 1989 Brownlow Medal winner.
- Des Ball - Special Professor in the Strategic and Defence Studies Centre.
