= Skipton, Victoria =

Skipton Woran
- Town
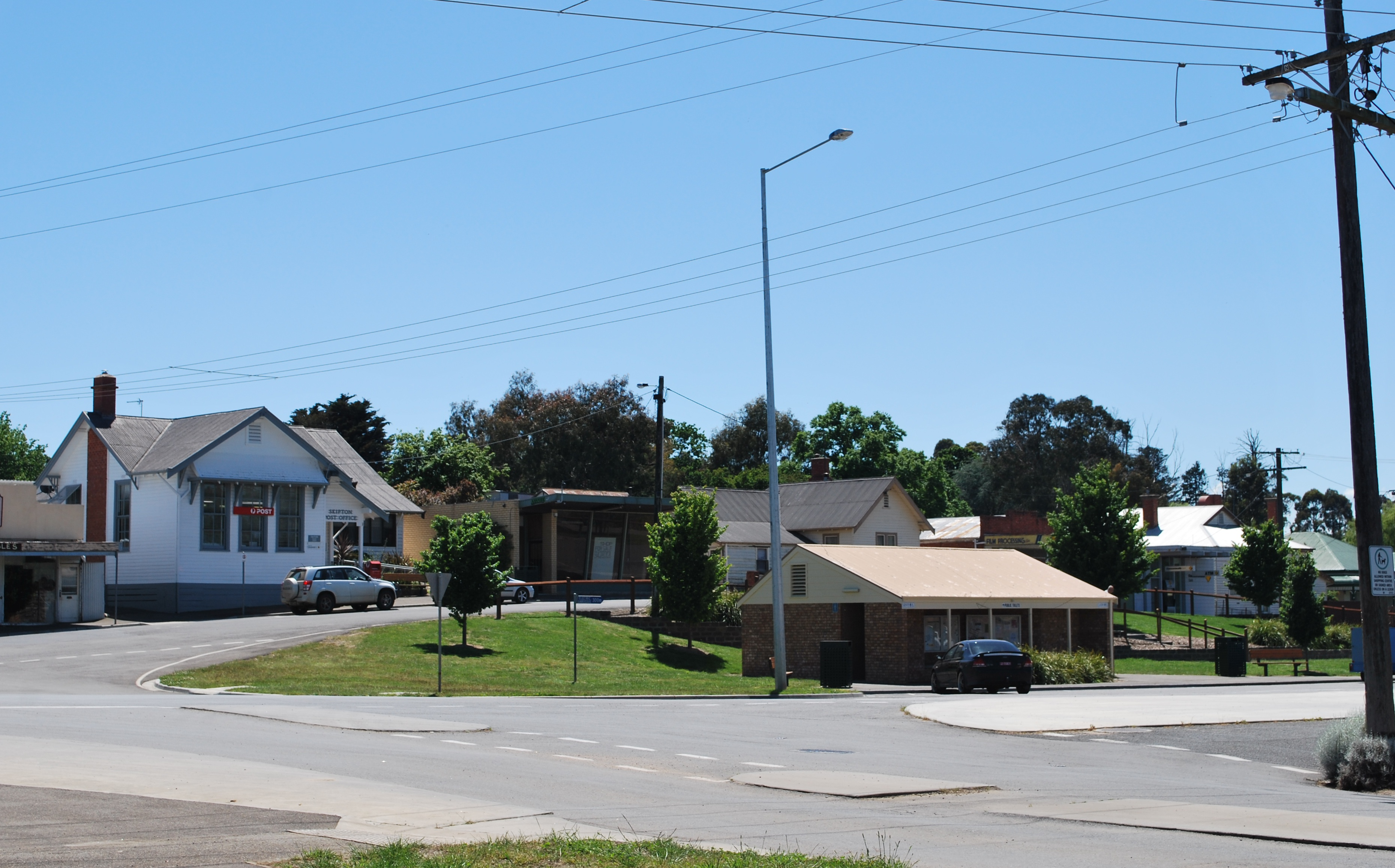
- Skipton

- Coordinates: 37°41′0″S 143°21′0″E
- Country: Australia
- State: Victoria
- LGA: Corangamite Shire
- Location: 166 km (103 mi) W of Melbourne; 52 km (32 mi) S of Ballarat; 127 km (79 mi) E of Hamilton; 128 km (80 mi) ENE of Warrnambool

Government
  - State electorate: Ripon
  - Federal division: Wannon
- Elevation: 279 m (915 ft)

Population
  - Total: 469 (UCL 2021)
- Postcode: 3361

Skipton (/skɪptən/) is a town in the Western District of Victoria, Australia. The town is situated on the Glenelg Highway 166 kilometres west of the state capital, Melbourne and 52 kilometres south west of the regional centre, Ballarat. Skipton is in the Shire of Corangamite LGA and is on the banks of Mount Emu Creek. At the 2016 census, Skipton had a population of 586, considerably less than the population of 927 at the 2011 census. Skipton is named after Skipton, in Yorkshire, England, and is known as "the home of the platypus". The Aboriginal name is given in colonial reports as Woran.

== History ==
Skipton was first established in 1839 as a pastoral run and a town site was surveyed in 1852. The town was settled some years later, with a local Post Office opening on 6 March 1858. The town held the first agricultural show in the Western District in 1859. Skipton once had a Magistrates' Court, but it closed on 1 January 1983.

St Andrew's Presbyterian Church was completed in 1872, replacing an earlier church near the cemetery.

== Culture ==
=== Economy ===
Fine wool is the main agricultural product of the Skipton area. Skipton Variety Market is held on every second Saturday of the month at the Mechanics Hall. A Rose Festival is held on the first Saturday after the running of the Melbourne Cup in November each year.

=== Sport and recreation ===
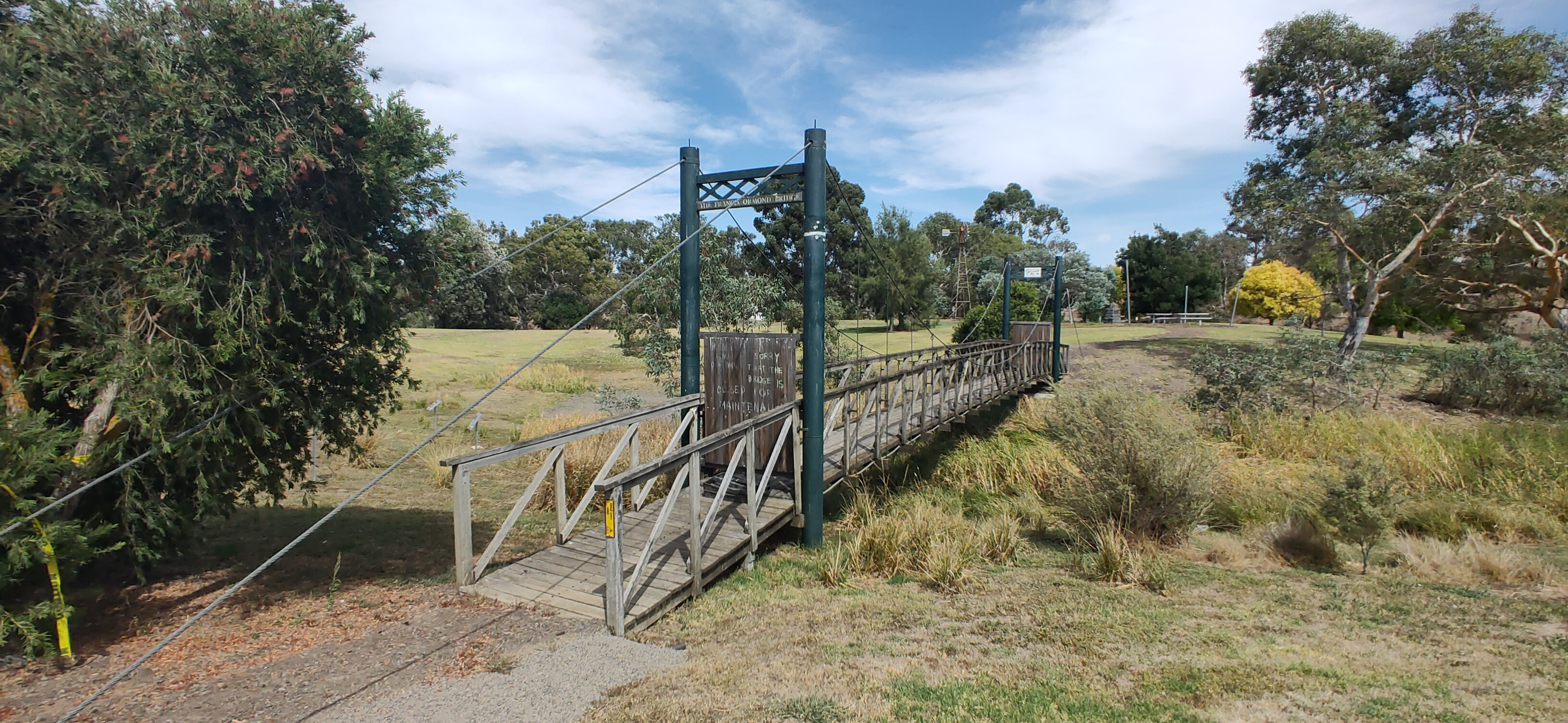
footbridge in Skipton, Victoria

A rail trail allows cyclists to ride between Skipton and Ballarat. Golfers play at the course of the Skipton Golf Club on Geelong-Skipton Road.

Skipton Football / Netball Club

Skipton has had a football club since 1873, when it was first established.

The club has competed in the Central Highlands Football League since 2011.

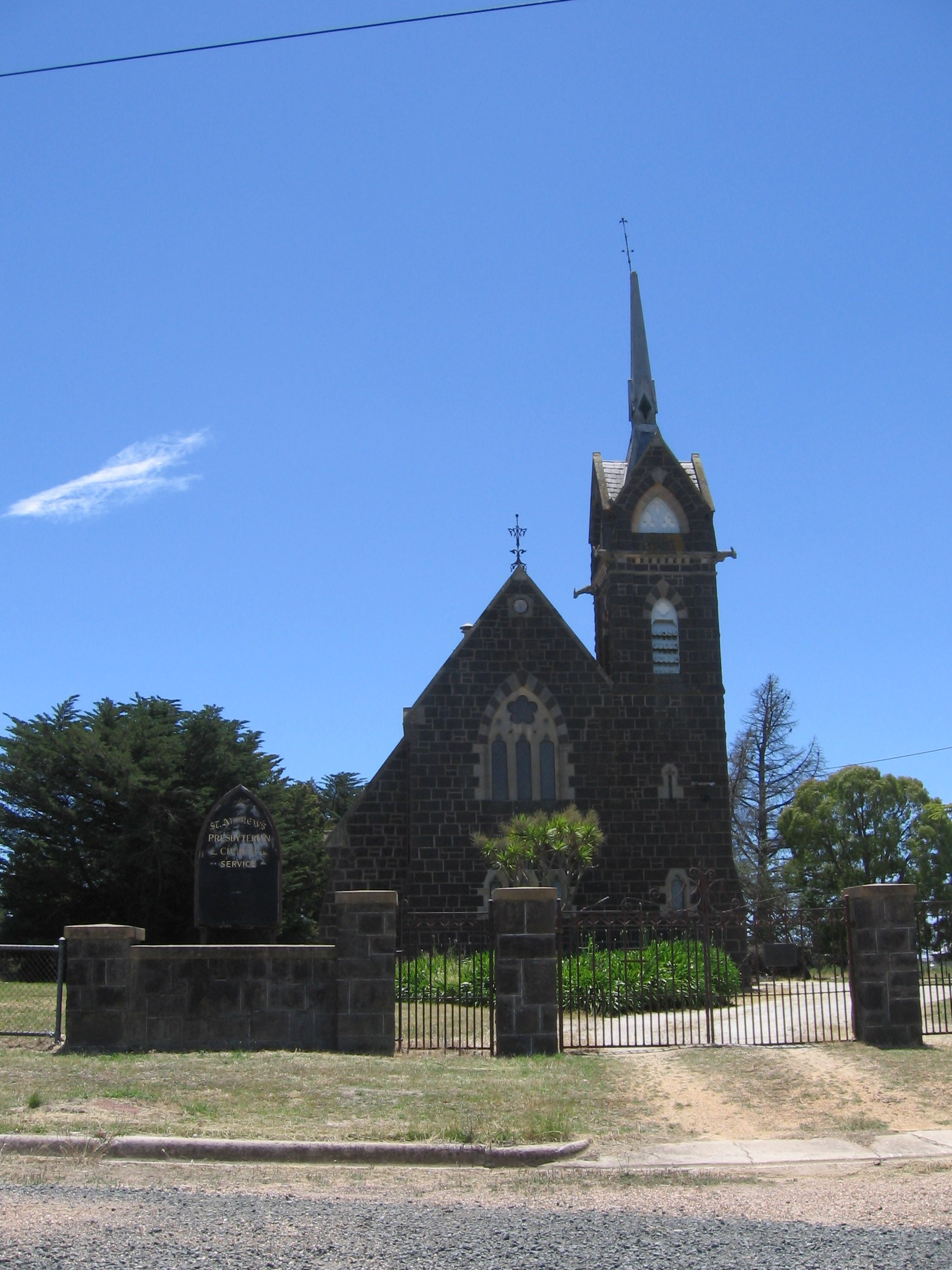
St Andrew's Presbyterian Church

== Notable people ==
- Henry Bolte, the longest serving Premier of Victoria, grew up in Skipton. There is a memorial for Henry Bolte located at the Skipton cemetery, where his parents are buried.
- Henry Kingsley, author and brother of Charles Kingsley, worked on a pastoral station near Skipton for a time in 1857.
- LKS Mackinnon, former chairman of the Victoria Racing Club.
- Silent movie star Claire Adams married the son of LKS Mackinnon, Scobie, and settled at Mooramong homestead near Skipton in 1937.
- Australian Test cricketer Alan Connolly was born in Skipton in 1939.
- The Academy Is... guitarist Michael Guy Chislett was born in Skipton.

== See also ==
- Banongill
- Carranballac Homestead
- Langi Willi
