= Cobden, Victoria =

Cobden
- Town
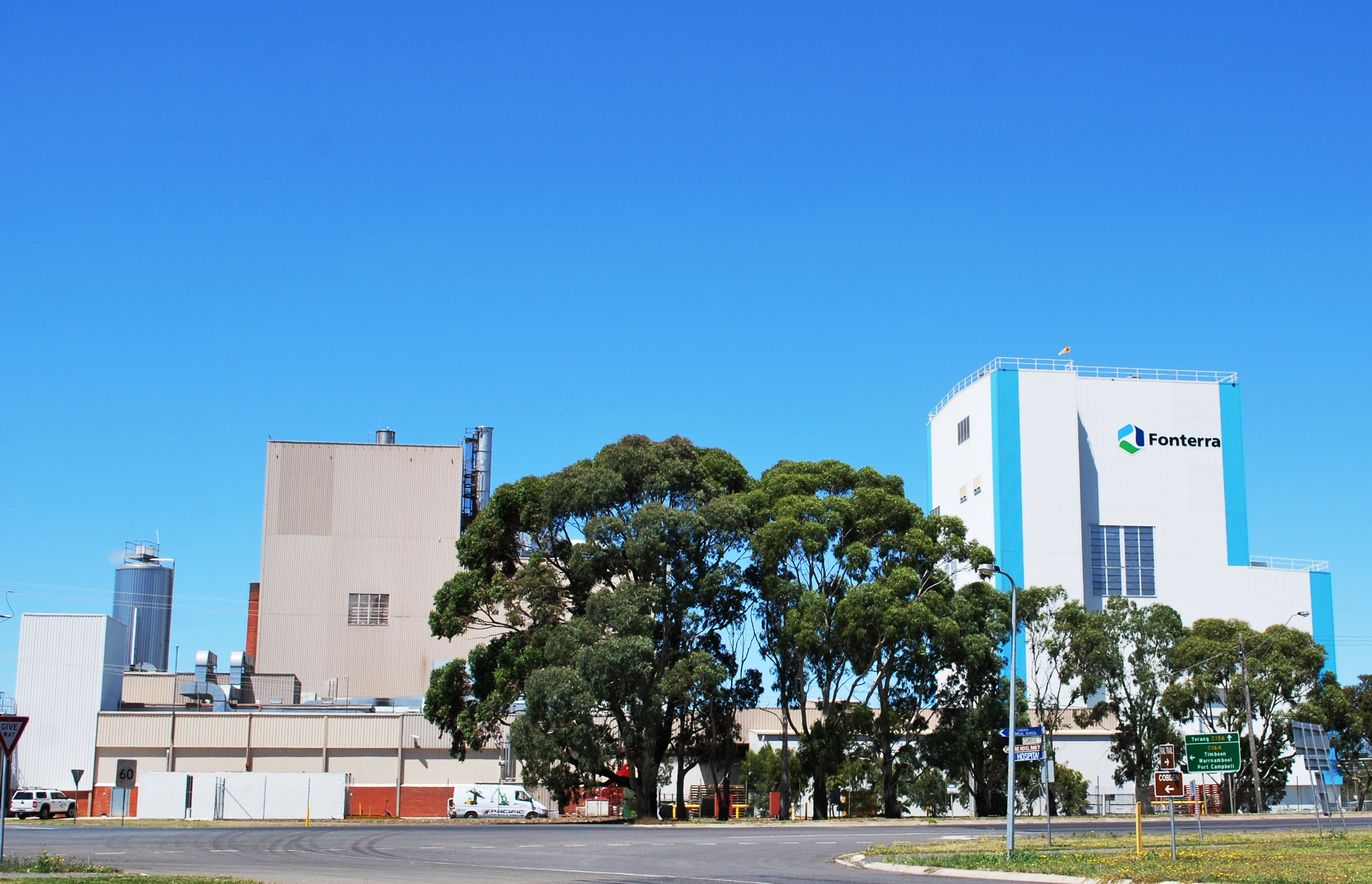
- Fonterra dairy plant at Cobden

- Coordinates: 38°20′0″S 143°04′0″E
- Country: Australia
- State: Victoria
- LGA: Corangamite Shire
- Location: 200 km (120 mi) SW of Melbourne; 50 km (31 mi) N of Port Campbell
- Established: 1840s

Government
  - State electorate: Polwarth
  - Federal division: Wannon

Population
  - Total: 1,839 (2016 census)
- Postcode: 3266

Cobden /ˈkɒbdən/ is a town located 200 kilometres southwest of Melbourne, Victoria, Australia named in honour of Richard Cobden. At the 2006 census, Cobden had a population of 1,813. At the 2001 census, Cobden had a population of 1,419.

== History ==
The Cobden area was settled by Europeans in the 1840s by Dr. Daniel Curdie, (1814–1884) a medical doctor from the Isle of Arran, Scotland, who was beloved by local Aboriginal warriors (who had settled there aeons before) for his habit of tending their wounds after tribal skirmishes. In 1840 he settled in the Heytesbury forest area on a small creek not far from where the present day Cobden lies. Dr. Curdie, so overcome by its beauty, christened the area Lovely Banks. When the town was surveyed in 1861 the area had to be renamed because there was already a place named Lovely Banks in west Geelong. It was decided to call the town Cobden after Richard Cobden (1804–65), an English Parliamentarian and advocate of free trade.

The Cobden Post Office was opened on 6 January 1867.

The Heytesbury Forest attracted logging companies and with them more settlers. Homes were built and stock set to graze on the newly established pasture. In April 1892 a railway was established from Camperdown thru Cobden to Timboon, a plan to extend the line to Port Campbell was never built, the train carried out timber and came back loaded with produce and provisions. The prosperity was not to last however and as the Heytesbury forest was reduced in size, most of it surviving in the Jancourt State Forest, The need for freight trains waned. The last train was in 1987. The line has since been removed, its place taken by a walking trail.

In 1888 Cobden opened the first cheese and butter factory in Victoria. Today the factory still operates, owned by Fonterra Co-operative Group Ltd, and houses the largest milk drying plant in Australia. Today Cobden and its surrounding area claim to be the "Dairy Capital" of the world, a claim based on the over 140,000 head of cattle in and around the area.

The Cobden Magistrates' Court closed on 1 November 1981, not having been visited by a Magistrate since 1976.

== Education ==
Children from the district attend Cobden Primary School or Cobden Technical School.

== Geography ==
Part of the reason for the rich soil that surrounds Cobden is its convenient location on the southern border of the Lakes and Craters Country, the fourth largest volcanic plain in the world. Though the volcanoes are dormant, the ash they once spewed has enriched the soil greatly.

== Community ==
The town has an Australian rules football and netball team playing in the Hampden Football League. The Cobden Bombers was a foundation club of the League and have won six premierships.

Golfers play at the Cobden Golf Club on Neylon Street.
