= Forrest, Victoria =

Forrest
- Town
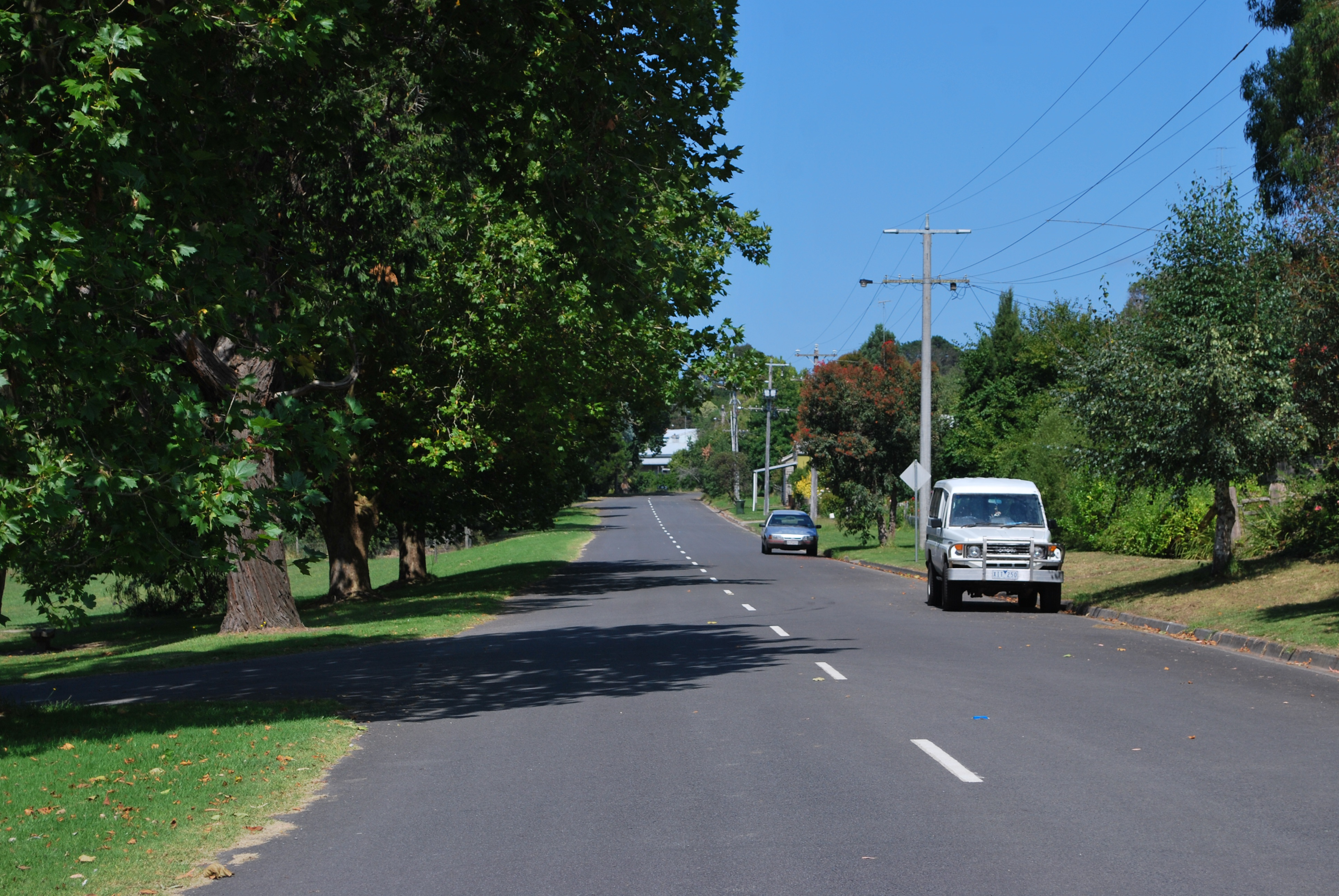
- Station Street in Forrest

- Coordinates: 38°31′0″S 143°43′0″E
- Country: Australia
- State: Victoria
- LGA: Colac Otway Shire
- Location: 158 km (98 mi) SW of Melbourne; 84 km (52 mi) W of Geelong; 27 km (17 mi) SE of Colac

Government
  - State electorate: Polwarth
  - Federal division: Wannon

Population
  - Total: 257 (2021 census)
- Postcode: 3236
Localities around Forrest
Kawarren	Gerangamete	Barwon Downs
Kawarren	Forrest	Barwon Downs
Barramunga	Barramunga	Barwon Downs

Forrest is a town in the Otway Ranges, Victoria, Australia. At the 2021 census, Forrest had a population of 257.

== History ==
The History of Forrest started more than 40,000 years ago. Forrest is at the northern end of the Otway Ranges. Historically, the Otway Ranges are the land of the Gadubanud people. The current boundaries of the Colac Otway Shire Council partially include land belonging to the tribes of the Gadubanud people and Gulidjan. Author Lawrence Niewójt (2009) attempted to reconstruct the cultural landscape created by the Gadubanud people prior to their disastrous encounter with Europeans in the late 1840s.

Their vast territory stretching from Painkalac Creek (near Aireys Inlet) in the east to the Gellibrand River that flows west of the mountains is over 100 kilometres and incorporates what is now Forrest. (Figure 1)

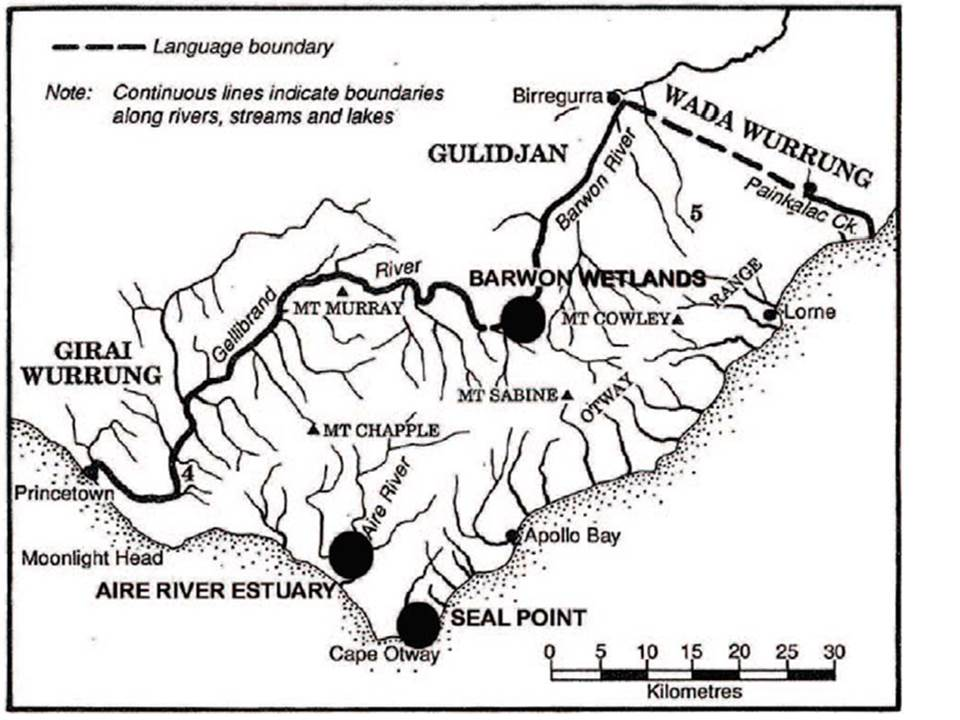
The traditional territory of the Gadubanud people and the approximate location of various clans

== European Settlement ==
The railway to the town was opened in 1891 and closed in 1957, as a branch line from Birregurra. It serviced the townships of Deans Marsh, Murroon, Barwon Downs, Yaugher and Forrest. At Forrest numerous tramways ran off into the nearby bush. These lines were used to bring the freshly cut timber to the rail head, and the associated sawmills of which there were four in Forrest and nearby Yaugher. All of these mills are now closed.

Originally called Yaugher, the name was changed to Forrest when the township was established. Forrest was named after Charles Lamond Forrest, the Colonial Government MLA representative for the district, who pushed for the rail link to be made. The railway station was opened as Yaugher on 5 June 1891, but renamed to Forrest on 21 September 1891. The Post Office also opened as Yaugher on 27 July 1891 and was also renamed Forrest 11 weeks later, on 15 October 1891.

Forrest Primary School opened on 24 November 1885, moved to a permanent site on 31 March 1906 and was extended in 1916 and 1961. A second school, Gellibrand Upper State School, operated from 31 May 1925 until 1933 "at the top end of Roadknight Creek Road".

The town football team was established in 1891 and competed in the Colac & District Football League until 2015, eventually folding after struggling to field netball and junior football teams due to lack of available players in the district.

== Today ==
Consisting of a general store, micro brewery, hotel, bike hire, guesthouse and a variety of accommodation rentals, Forrest is the gateway to the Otway Ranges. It is a destination for adventure tourists which is now the primary economic driver of the town. The two main drawcards for visiting tourists are the mountain bike trails and the platypus tour at Lake Elizabeth. The West Barwon river flows through the township and it is near the West Barwon reservoir, which services Geelong.

During the past few years the town has begun to grow again with an influx of people seeking more affordable blocks of land not that far away from the coastal resorts of Apollo Bay, Skenes Creek, Grey River, Kennett River and Lorne. These can be reached either by a pleasant drive on a sealed main road or by ex-timber blue metal roads. Advice should be sought before motoring on the backroads to Kennett River, Wye River and Grey River.

Fauna to be viewed on these drives include Australian king parrots, crimson rosellas, grey swamp wallabies, echidnas. Koalas have in the past been released into the Otways. The Smith Street Band recorded their third album Throw Me in the River in Forrest in July 2014.

== Mountain biking ==
After the cessation of logging in the Otways, the Government of Victoria made funds available for the creation of dedicated Mountain bike trails in the Yaugher area, in order to replace the logging industry. Mountain biking was seen as an addition to the already plentiful eco-tourism industry. Mountain biking now makes up a large portion of the economy in Forrest. The area now has over 70 kilometres (43.5 mi) of sign posted "single track". Further details can be found at the official website www.rideforrest.com.au

Forrest is home to the following annual Mountain Bike Event

- Otway Odyssey - 10, 30, 50k and 100k mountain bike event, plus gravel events also
