= Skenes Creek North =

- Suburb
- Coordinates: 38°41′03″S 143°43′02″E
- Country: Australia
- State: Victoria
- LGA: Colac Otway Shire
- Location: 83 km (52 mi) SW of Geelong; 146 km (91 mi) SW of Melbourne

Government
  - State electorate: Polwarth
  - Federal division: Wannon

Population
  - Total: 19 (SAL 2021)
- Postcode: 3233
Suburbs around Skenes Creek North
Tanybryn	Tanybryn	Tanybryn
Apollo Bay	Skenes Creek North	Wongarra
Skenes Creek	Skenes Creek	Wongarra

Skenes Creek North is a locality in the Shire of Colac Otway, Victoria, Australia. In the 2016 census, Skenes Creek North had a population of 16.

A telegraph/post office named "Biddles" opened around June 1920. It was renamed Skene's Creek North on 1 January 1938 and closed on 15 January 1960.
