= Wongarra =

- Town
- Coordinates: 38°40′28″S 143°47′10″E
- Country: Australia
- State: Victoria
- LGA: Colac Otway Shire
- Location: 44 km (27 mi) SE of Colac; 80 km (50 mi) SW of Geelong; 144 km (89 mi) SW of Melbourne

Government
  - State electorate: Polwarth
  - Federal division: Wannon

Population
  - Total: 47 (SAL 2021)
- Postcode: 3234
Localities around Wongarra
Mount Sabine	Kennett River	Kennett River
Tanybryn	Wongarra	Grey River
Skenes Creek North, Skenes Creek and Petticoat Creek	Sugarloaf and Bass Strait	Bass Strait

Wongarra is a locality in the Shire of Colac Otway, Victoria, Australia. In the 2016 census, Wongarra had a population of 37.

The Great Ocean Road runs along the coastline through Wongarra, with Sunnyside Road the only road running inland in the area. Much of the northern area of Wongarra is either state forest or lies within the Great Otway National Park. The locality contains scenic tourist destinations Cape Patton and the Carisbrook Falls.

A postal receiving office opened at Wongarra from 1 October 1912. Wongarra Post Office opened on 1 July 1927 and closed on 11 December 1971.

Wongarra State School opened in 1893 and closed in 1930. It operated at different times as a half-time school with the schools at Skenes Creek and Geach's Track.

The 3234 postcode, which includes Wongarra and Wye River, had the tenth-highest incomes of any in the state in 2010–11. It contains the four-star Whitecrest Resort, and the Points South holiday cottages, formerly run by ex-Tour de France cyclist Phil Anderson.

The well-known Otway Harvest truffle farm is located on Sunnyside Road, Wongarra. It was most recently sold in mid-2014 for over A$2,000,000. In 2012, it reportedly sold its truffles wholesale for a price of $2,500 per kilogram.

Surf Life Saving Australia rates the beaches along the Wongarra coastline as either highly or extremely dangerous for swimming, although they note that sections of them are popular for rock fishing. There are two surfing breaks in the area, known as "Boneyards" and "Juniors".

The former Carisbrook Mill site, located off Sunnyside Road, is listed on the Shire of Colac Otway Heritage Inventory.
