= Vin Lidgerwood =

Australian rules footballer, born 1916

Personal information
- Full name: Vincent Hamilton Lidgerwood
- Born: 22 July 1916; Forrest, Victoria
- Died: 8 February 1977 (aged 60); Colac, Victoria
- Height: 183 cm (6 ft 0 in)
- Weight: 86 kg (190 lb)

Playing career^{1}
Years	Club	Games (Goals)
1944	Geelong	1 (0)
- ^{1} Playing statistics correct to the end of 1944.

Vincent Hamilton Lidgerwood (22 July 1916 – 8 February 1977) was an Australian rules footballer who played with Geelong in the Victorian Football League (VFL).
