= Lake Elizabeth (Victoria) =

Natural lake near Forrest, Victoria, Australia

- Lake Elizabeth

- Location in Victoria
- Location: Otway Ranges, Victoria, Australia
- Coordinates: 38°33′9″S 143°45′24″E
- Type: Natural dam
- Primary inflows: Barwon River
- Primary outflows: Barwon River
- Basin countries: Australia
- First flooded: 1952
- Max. length: ~1 kilometre (0.62 mi)
- Surface area: 8.41 hectares (20.8 acres)
- Average depth: ~10 metres (33 ft)

Lake Elizabeth is a natural perched lake in the Otway Ranges of southwestern Victoria, Australia. It lies on the upper East Barwon River within the Great Otway National Park, 5 km southeast of the township of Forrest. The lake is known for its distinctive drowned tree trunks, rich forest surroundings, and geological significance as a landslide-formed body of water. It is a popular destination for bushwalking, camping, mountain biking, canoeing and wildlife observation, including sightings of the platypus. The lake formed when a landslide blocked the river in 1952. It is named after Queen Elizabeth II.

== Geography and access ==
Lake Elizabeth is located in a forested valley of the Otway Ranges and extends for about 1 kilometre along the East Barwon River. The lake is characterised by numerous dead tree trunks protruding from its waters, remnants of the original forest inundated when the lake formed. It is a perched lake, existing above the natural water table, created when a natural landslide dammed the East Barwon River. The surrounding catchment forms part of the upper Barwon River system, which ultimately drains into Bass Strait. The lake can be accessed by a moderate-level walking trail, which, to the nearest carpark, is 1.5 km return, or an hour. A loop trail also exists around the lake, which is 4 km return to the car park, and takes 2 hours.

== History ==
Forrest developed as a timber town from the early period of European settlement, particularly after 1945, when timber production expanded rapidly to meet the demands of post-war construction. At the time, the surrounding forests were administered by the Forests Commission Victoria, a statutory authority responsible for forest management. During this period, the officer-in-charge of the Forrest Forest District was forester Bill Meadows, who was 27 years old at the time of the lake's formation.

In mid-June 1952, an extended period of exceptionally heavy rainfall affected the Otway Ranges. Meadows and his assistant, Mark Stump, later recalled spending the long weekend indoors "playing endless games of Monopoly" while the rain continued unabated. Rainfall records show that on 17 and 18 June 1952, a total of approximately 40 inches (1,005 millimeters) of rain fell at Tanybryn, near the crest of the Otways.

During the same period, Forest Overseer Jack Hoult was informed by a farmer further down on the East Barwon River that, despite severe flooding on the nearby West Barwon River, the East Barwon remained unusually low. In response, Meadows, Hoult and Hoult's son John travelled by Land Rover along Kaanglang Road, which had recently been rebuilt by forestry staff. They discovered that a section of the road approximately 400 metres long had been completely destroyed by a massive landslide, exposing steep bedrock surfaces where the track had once been.

The landslide had deposited tens of thousands of tons of earth, rock and forest debris into the East Barwon River, effectively damming its flow. Water subsequently backed up behind the natural barrier, inundating the upstream valley and killing the standing forest. After a period of impoundment, the water overtopped the landslide dam, causing minor flooding downstream. Over time, a stable spillway formed, resulting in the permanent lake that exists today.

As the officer responsible for the district, Meadows received numerous inquiries from the Melbourne Sun newspaper following the lake's sudden appearance. When asked what the new body of water was called, he spontaneously replied "Lake Elizabeth," reportedly in reference to the recent accession of Queen Elizabeth II.

From the late twentieth century onwards, Lake Elizabeth and its surrounding catchment became the focus of conservation interest due to its geological rarity and environmental value. In the 1980s, studies recommended the protection of the upper East Barwon catchment, and the area was recognised for its national and geomorphological significance. Conservation groups later campaigned against logging in parts of the surrounding forest, citing the lake's scientific, ecological, and recreational importance.

Today, Lake Elizabeth lies within the Great Otway National Park, which was established in 2005 through the amalgamation of state forests and reserves. The lake has since become a popular tourist attraction.

== See also ==
- Barwon River
- Forrest, Victoria
- Otway Ranges
- Great Ocean Road
- Twelve Apostles
- Hopetoun Falls
