= Mount Sabine, Victoria =

Mount Sabine
- Coordinates: 38°38′02″S 143°44′34″E
- Country: Australia
- State: Victoria
- LGA: Colac Otway Shire
- Location: 36 km (22 mi) SE of Colac; 75 km (47 mi) SW of Geelong; 140 km (87 mi) SW of Melbourne

Government
  - State electorate: Polwarth
  - Federal division: Wannon

Population
  - Total: 0 (SAL 2016)
- Postcode: 3236
Localities around Mount Sabine
Barramunga	Barramunga	Kennett River
Tanybryn	Mount Sabine	Kennett River
Tanybryn	Tanybryn	Wongarra

Mount Sabine is a locality in the Shire of Colac Otway, Victoria, Australia. The small locality is located deep in the Otway Ranges, and is mostly densely forested.

== History ==
The first major track between Colac and Apollo Bay passed over Mount Sabine, and was marked on maps by 1864 at the latest. The Land Act 1869 opened the area up for selection, but only a limited number of selectors took up land, mostly along the Apollo Bay or nearby Beech Forest tracks. The track was rough; in 1880, travellers complained that the road was "almost impassable" and that they had "to wade up to their knees in mud and slush", and in 1889 a correspondent reported the track from Apollo Bay to Mount Sabine as involving "the most formidable climbing ever met with on a road in this country".

A timber industry had been established by the 1870s; the Otway Ranges were a Timber Reserve from 1873 to 1879, and a sawmill at Mount Sabine was reported in 1874 as having been operational for some time. The amount of selectors in the area increased in the 1880s, in large part due to a rumored future railway through the area; however, while railways were built into the Otway Ranges, extensions to the Mount Sabine area never occurred. There were high hopes for farming in the area, with the Colac Herald speculating in 1885 that Mount Sabine would "become converted into the most fertile of agricultural and pastoral countries". Some farmers did report limited success into the twentieth century, but in the long-term these hopes were also ill-fated.

Transport remained a major problem throughout the attempts to settle the Mount Sabine area. Expectations in the 1880s and 1890s that a railway line would be extended towards Mount Sabine did not eventuate, and a strong campaign for an extension of the Forrest railway line to Barramunga, just short of Mount Sabine, from the 1890s to the 1910s would also prove unsuccessful. In 1904, the Colac Herald reported that there was "not one yard of metalled or formed road" to Mount Sabine, and that residents had "to use the sleigh and pack saddle, and wade through fifteen miles of mud to get to a railway station". The main road to Apollo Bay through Mount Sabine would be eventually metalled in the late 1920s, after which time a Melbourne newspaper described the road as "splendid".

Mount Sabine had limited services besides the sawmilling and farming operations, with Barramunga becoming the village centre for the area instead. A boarding house providing "every comfort" with "first-class meals" was recommended by a Geelong Advertiser correspondent in 1886. A postal receiving office opened on 13 May 1907, was upgraded to a full post office on 1 July 1927 and closed on 13 January 1939 after the building was burnt down in a bushfire. A school opened on 28 September 1908 and operated half-time with Apollo Bay Road State School; its date of closure is unknown. A public hall was reported to be under construction in 1922, but was never referred to in newspapers again.

Mount Sabine was repeatedly affected by bushfires throughout its attempts at settlement: in 1886, one selector lost everything and many others had feared being burned to death; in 1908, two young children were severely burned, one of them fatally; in 1919, at least 100 houses were burned in the surrounding districts; and in 1939, a bushfire destroyed the Mount Sabine post office.

The attempts to farm both Mount Sabine and the surrounding area ultimately failed, with the remoteness of the area hindering development. Many of the areas cleared by the early settlers have reverted to scrub or regenerated as forest.

Sabine Falls, is located within Mount Sabine at the headwaters of Smythe Creek. A further, more isolated group of more than seven waterfalls in the area was discovered in 2003.
