= Petticoat Creek =

Petticoat Creek may refer to:

- Petticoat Creek (Canada), a stream in the cities of Pickering, Toronto and Markham in the Greater Toronto Area of Ontario, Canada
- Petticoat Creek, Victoria, a coastal locality in the Shire of Colac Otway, Victoria, Australia
