= Kennett River Beach =

Beach in Victoria, Australia

- Beach
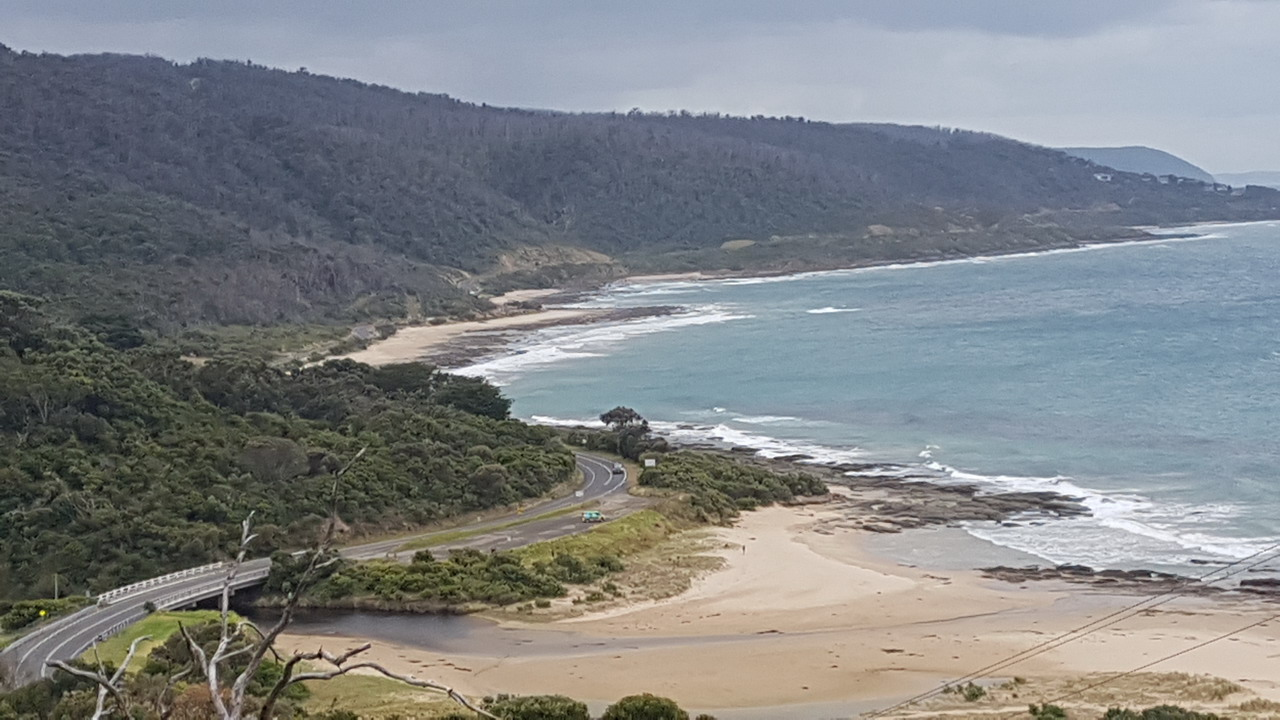
- Kennett River Beach
- Interactive map of Kennett River Beach
- Coordinates: 38°40′05″S 143°51′47″E
- Location: Kennett River, Victoria, Australia
- Water bodies: Bass Strait

Dimensions
  - Length: 0.2 kilometres (0.12 mi)
- Hazard rating: 7/10 (highly hazardous)
- Access: Great Ocean Road

Kennett River Beach is a small beach located at the town of Kennett River on the Great Ocean Road in Victoria, Australia. Situated at the mouth of the Kennet River, the beach is enclosed by rocky headlands and reefs and is backed by the Great Ocean Road and the town's foreshore. Despite its relatively small size, it is a popular destination for swimming, surfing, fishing and exploring rock pools, with seasonal patrols provided by the Kennett River Surf Life Saving Club.

== History ==
In 1939, seven years after the completion of the Great Ocean Road, a sawmill was established near the coastline at Kennett River. The mill operate for almost three decades before closing in 1967. Remnants of this industry remain visible today, including a deposit of black sawdust on the beach near Cassidy Drive.

== Description ==
Kennett River Beach is formed where the Kennet River enters the Southern Ocean through a broad valley. The beach extends for approximately 200 metres and faces east, with Point Hawdon projecting into the sea to the southeast and providing partial protection from ocean swells. Steep vegetated slopes around the valley, while sandstone rock platforms and extensive offshore reefs border both sides of the beach. The Great Ocean Road runs immediately behind the foreshore, with a caravan park beside it, and a car park and the Kennett River Surf Life Saving Club are situated between the road and the shoreline.

Wave conditions at Kennett River Beach are influenced by the river mouth, reefs and rocky headlands, with average wave heights of around 1.3 metres. These features create strong permanent rip currents near the rocks and reefs, making the beach hazardous whenever large swells are present. During calmer summer conditions, the central section of the beach provides relatively safer swimming under patrol, while the river mouth offers a more sheltered area that is popular with families. The Kennett River Surf Life Saving Club records an average of around 5 rescues each year.

Kennett River Beach is also recognised as one of the Surf Coast's most popular surfing locations. Different breaks form depending on swell conditions, with the Rivermouth break working in moderate surf, larger swells producing waves around Kennett Point, and the offshore Sawmill Reef breaking during the biggest conditions. Fishing is another popular activity, with access available from the river, river mouth, beach and surrounding rock platforms. Rock pools along the edges of the beach provide opportunities to observe marine life, while the beach is also well known as a scenic location for watching the sunrise.

== See also ==
- Thirteenth Beach
- Torquay Surf Beach
- Torquay Front Beach
- Jan Juc Beach
- Great Ocean Road
