= Jeffrey Adams =

Jeffrey or Geoffrey Adams may refer to:

- Jeff Adams (born 1970), Canadian Paralympian athlete
- Jeff Adams (American football) (born 1989), American football player
- Jeffrey Adams (mathematician) (born 1956), American mathematician at the University of Maryland
- Jeffrey S. Adams, American politician from Maine
- Geoffrey Adams (born 1957), British diplomat
- Geoffrey Adams (cricketer) (1909–1998), English cricketer
- Jeff Adams, character in The Amazing Mrs. Holliday
- Jeff Adams, candidate in the United States House of Representatives elections in Illinois, 2010
