= Kennet River (Victoria) =

Perennial river in Victoria, Australia

Kennet
- Location of the Kennet River mouth in Victoria
- Etymology: River Kennet, England

Location
- Country: Australia
- State: Victoria
- Region: South East Coastal Plain (IBRA), The Otways
- Local government area: Colac Otway Shire

Physical characteristics
- Source: Otway Ranges
  - location: below Muddy Saddle
  - coordinates: 38°46′9″S 143°35′20″E
  - elevation: 356 m (1,168 ft)
- Source confluence: West and East Branches of the Kennet River
- Mouth: Addis Bay, Bass Strait
  - location: Kennett River (town)
  - coordinates: 38°40′01″S 143°51′53″E
  - elevation: 0 m (0 ft)
- Length: 10 km (6.2 mi)

Basin features
- River system: Corangamite catchment
- National park: Port Campbell National Park

The Kennet River, now commonly spelt Kennett River, is a perennial river of the Corangamite catchment, in the Otways region of the Australian state of Victoria.

== Location and features ==
Formed by the confluence of the west and east branches of the river, the Kennet River rises in the Otway Ranges in southwest Victoria, below Muddy Saddle, and flows generally east by south through the Port Campbell National Park before reaching its river mouth and emptying into Addis Bay within Bass Strait, northeast of Cape Otway at the locality of Kennett River. From its highest point, the river descends 290 metres (950 ft) over its 10-kilometre (6.2 mi) course.

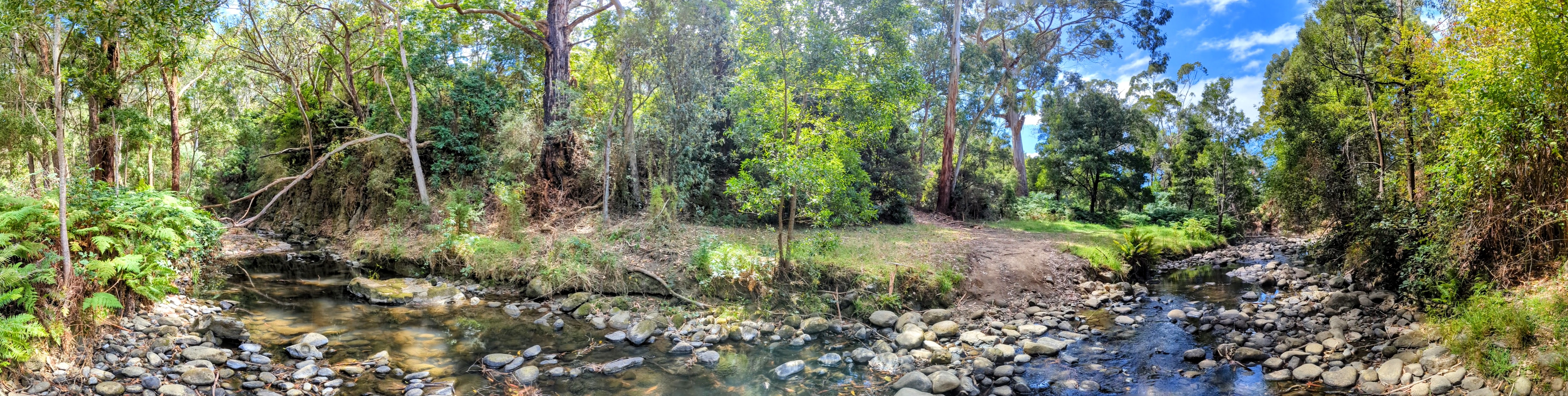
Along the Kennett River walk off the Great Ocean Road
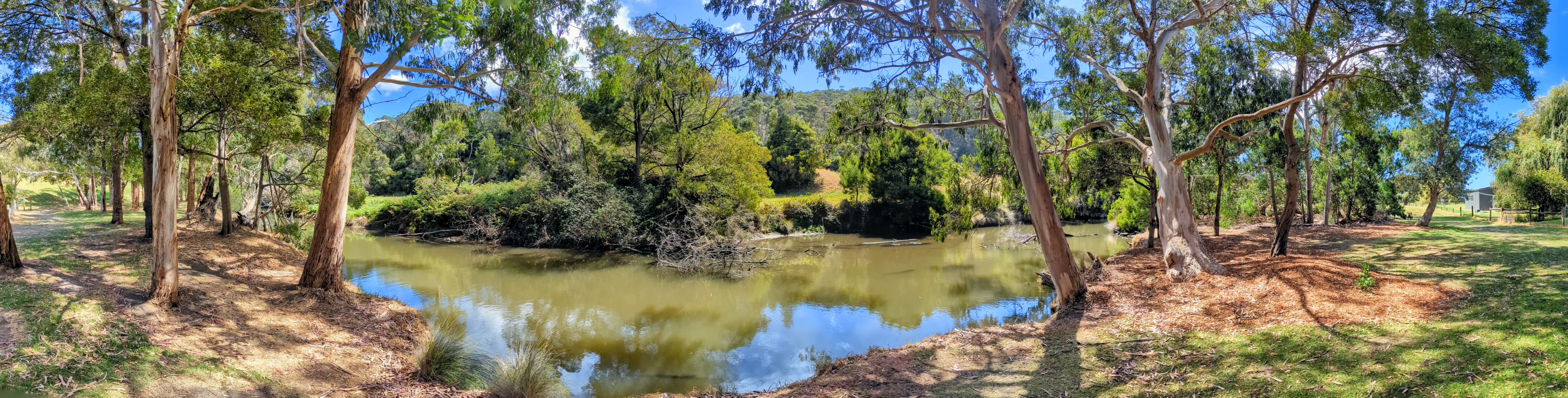
Kennett River walk, closer to the mouth

== Etymology ==
The river was named by surveyor George Smythe after the River Kennet in Berkshire, England.

== See also ==
- List of rivers of Australia § Victoria
