= Barramunga =

- Coordinates: 38°34′56″S 143°43′21″E
- Country: Australia
- State: Victoria
- LGA: Colac Otway Shire
- Location: 21 km (13 mi) N of Apollo Bay; 77 km (48 mi) SW of Geelong; 142 km (88 mi) SW of Melbourne

Government
  - State electorate: Polwarth
  - Federal division: Wannon

Population
  - Total: 11 (2021)
- Postcode: 3249
Localities around Barramunga
Gellibrand	Forrest	Barwon Downs
Beech Forest	Barramunga	Separation Creek; Wye River
Beech Forest	Tanybryn; Mount Sabine	Kennett River

Barramunga is a locality in the Shire of Colac Otway, Victoria, Australia. The small locality is located deep in the Otway Ranges, and is mostly forested. At the 2021 census, Barramunga had a population of 11.

== History ==
The locality largely developed from the 1880s due to the growth of the local timber industry, with the area first being opened for timber selection in 1884, though a successful dairying industry also developed for several decades.

Barramunga State School opened in 1886 and a post office opened on 14 February 1887. A general store and a hotel, the Junction Hotel, both operated by W. F. Danaher, opened around 1888. The hotel was a meeting-place for local activities and interest groups for many years. The Junction Hotel burned down in a bushfire, along with a neighbouring house, in February 1893, was rebuilt, and narrowly escaped being burnt down again in another bushfire in 1898. There were also Methodist and Anglican churches at Barramunga at one time.

There was a local campaign to extend the Forrest railway line to Barramunga from the 1880s, but it was ultimately unsuccessful.

The locality declined over the course of the twentieth century as both the timber and dairying industries declined. The hotel was delicensed in 1929, though it continued to provide accommodation to itinerant workers, now as "Junction House". The last sawmill at Barramunga itself burned down in a bushfire in 1939 and did not reopen.

A new public hall opened during the 1950s, following a post-World War II resurgence in the timber industry. However, the area declined again from the 1960s, as sawmills closed and farmland was resumed to protect water catchments. The school closed in 1974 and the hall fell into disuse thereafter. The former school, and later the hall as well, then became a school camp for Colac High School. The store and post office closed on 27 February 1981. The school camp closed in the 1990s, after which the former hall was sold into private ownership and the former school building removed.

There are two heritage sites in Barramunga listed on the Victorian Heritage Register, both related to the area's sawmilling past: the ruins of Henry's Mill No. 1 (1904-1927), the largest sawmill in the eastern Otways at the time, and Henry's Tramway Tunnel, reputedly the most intact tramline tunnel in Victoria.
