= Colac Herald =

Newspaper in Victoria, Australia

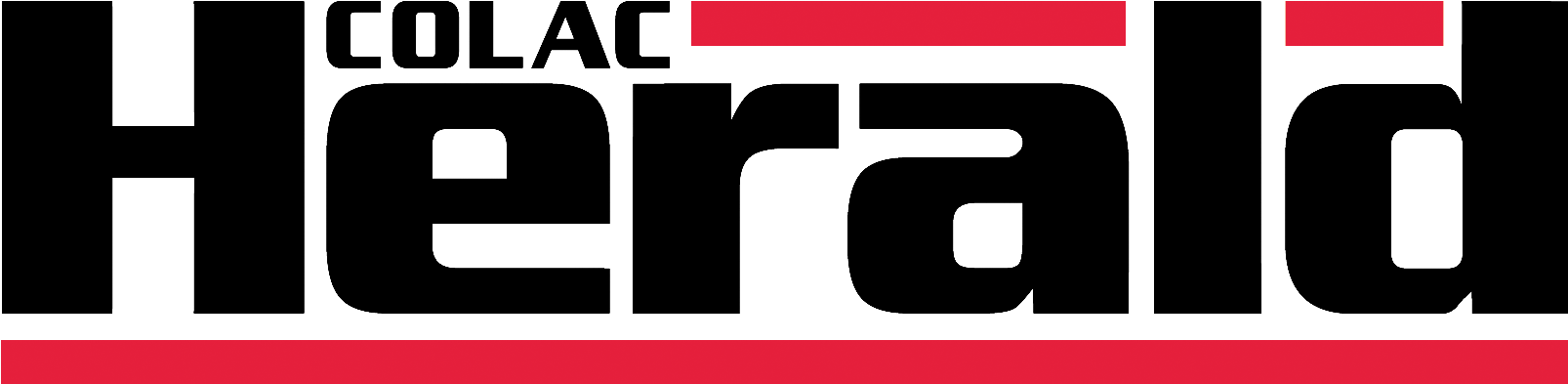

- Front page from 23 January 2026
- Type: Biweekly newspaper
- Format: Tabloid
- Owner: Greenstone Media Pty Ltd
- Editor: Naomi Newcombe
- Founded: 1866; 160 years ago
- Headquarters: 37–41 Bromfield Street, Colac, Victoria, Australia
- Website: http://www.colacherald.com.au/

Colac Herald is a newspaper servicing Colac, Victoria, Australia, and surrounding areas. It was first published in 1866. The newspaper is published two times a week, on Tuesdays and Fridays. Throughout its history, the newspaper has remained one of the few independent media outlets in Australia, maintaining a focus on local journalism. In March 2017, the Colac Herald was acquired by Greenstone Media Pty Ltd. Despite the change in ownership, the paper has continued to operate as a locally owned publication.

With a long-standing presence in the region, the Colac Herald continues to play a significant role in regional media, offering coverage of local events, issues, and sporting achievements, and serving as a platform for local advertising.

== History ==
=== 1866-1885 ===
Thomas Haslem established Colac's first newspaper The Observer in August 1866. After only two years of publication, residents expressed their dissatisfaction with its operation. Community members felt that a second newspaper should be created to fairly represent the commercial views and other interests of the district. The editor of the Observer, a Mr Nash, severed his connection with the original paper and formed a small company with other staff members to inaugurate the proposed new paper.

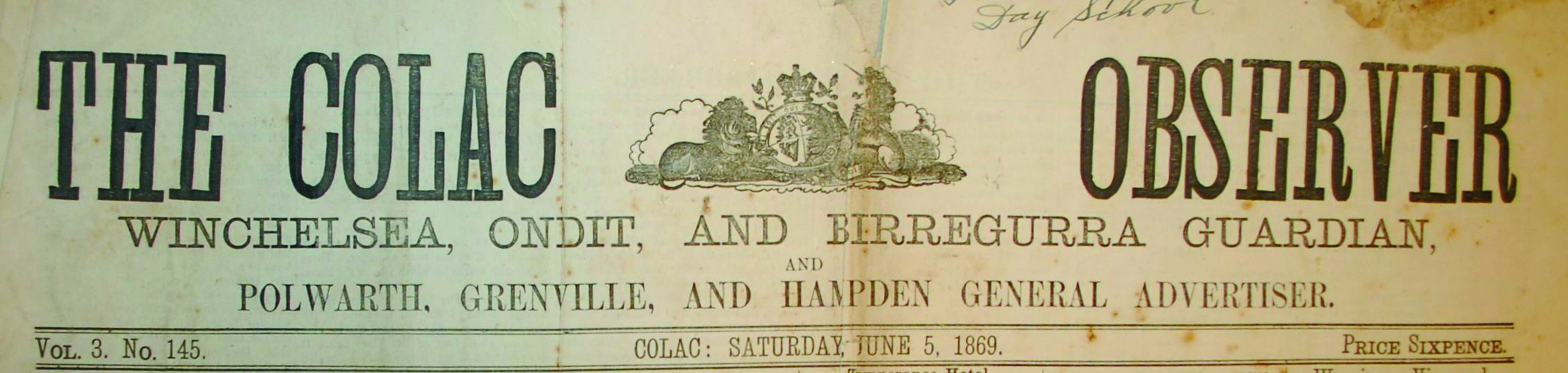
The Colac Observer masthead from 1869

The Colac Herald's first edition came out on October 26, 1869, with pages originally measuring 37.5 cm by 50 cm. The first office of the Colac Herald was a small wooden structure on the corner of Polwarth Street and Murray Street, but the business later moved to a building in Murray Street which is now the site of the Colac RSL. The Herald was published on Tuesdays and Fridays at 5pm and was delivered half an hour later within a one-mile radius of the office. After struggling with insufficient capital for the first three months, Mr Nash approached his brother-in-law John Woods for financial assistance.

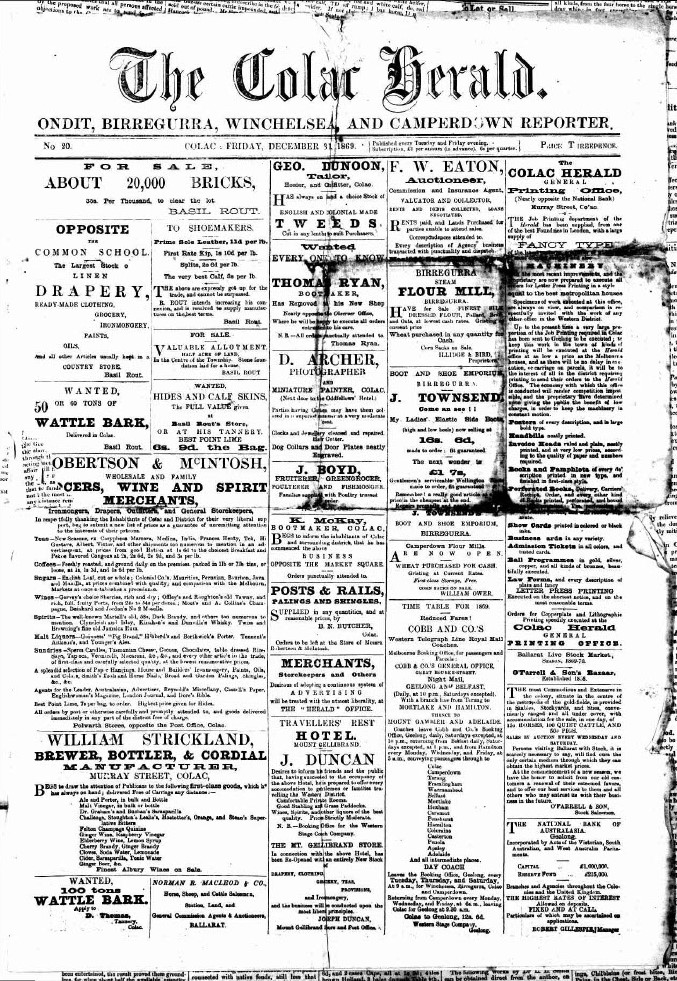
The Colac Herald front page from 31 Dec 1869

On February 1, 1870, an advertisement appeared in the Herald stating that a partnership had been entered into by Mr Nash and Mr Woods to enable the paper to continue publication. Mr Nash remained in the position as editor for a short time but then retired, leaving Mr Woods as the sole proprietor of the Colac Herald.

Robert Woods, a brother of John Woods, assumed the editorship and he became a partner in the firm. On October 27, 1874, five years after the establishment of the Colac Herald, Mr Woods bought the goodwill and copyright of The Observer and incorporated the two newspapers. Following the purchase of The Observer, the Herald changed to a morning bi-weekly publication.

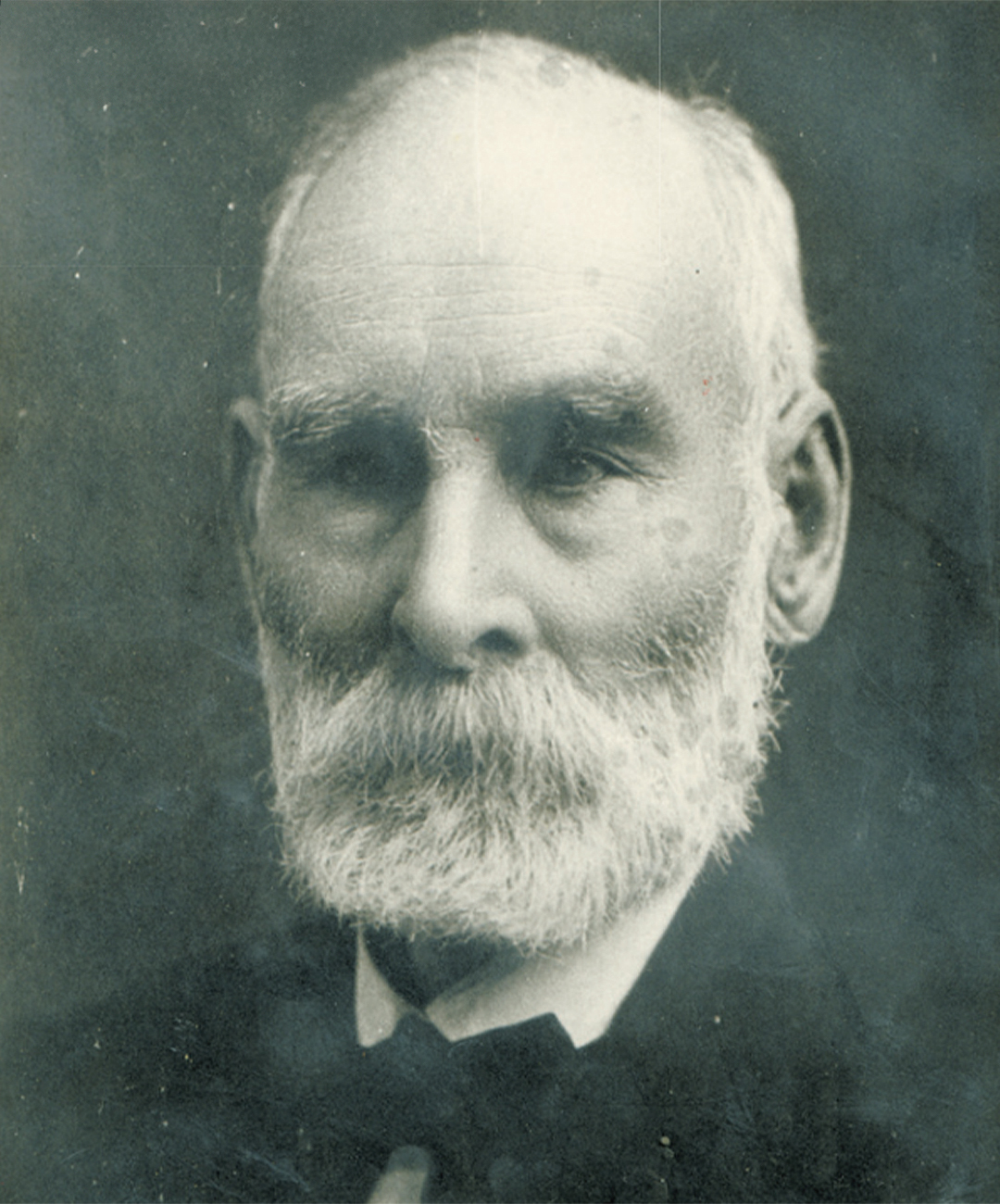
John Woods 1868 - 1928

At the same time as the purchase and incorporation, another paper The Times, a bi-weekly was established, printed and published by Robert Harris. The Times was also a bi-weekly and intense rivalry existed between the two newspapers. The Colac Herald increased to a tri-weekly from 1876, being published on Monday, Wednesday and Friday mornings.

A fire in 1885 destroyed the Colac Herald's offices and contents, causing several issues of the newspaper to be missed because of the great loss. The company moved into new offices in Queen Street, Colac where workers installed new equipment. The new equipment enabled the Colac Herald to be enlarged to broadsheet size.

=== 1886-1915 ===
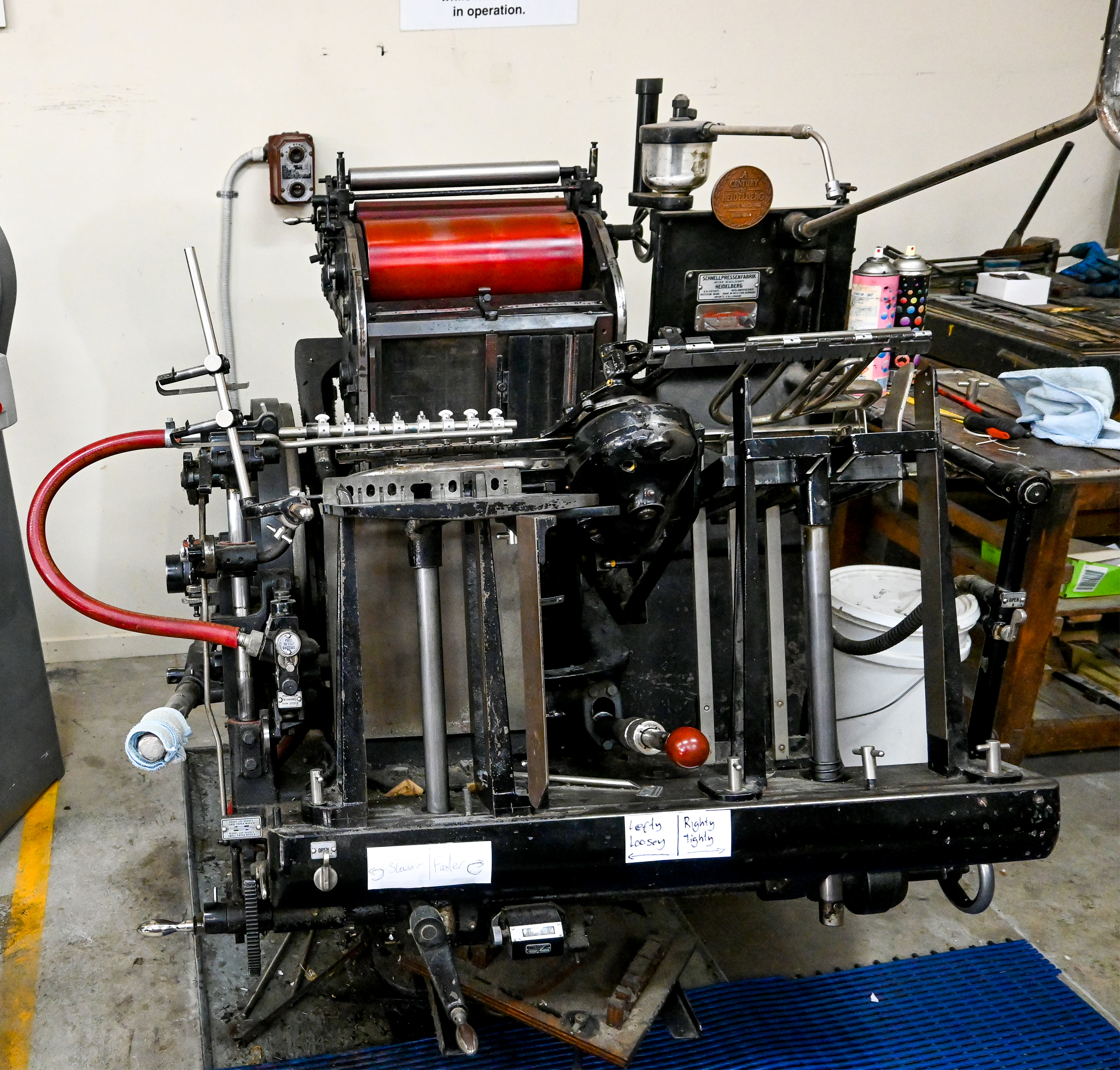
Heritage printing machine in Colac Herald's current offices

In 1887 Mr Woods introduced the first gas engine to the district and this made production of the paper less laborious. In 1899, brick offices were built opposite the Union Club Hotel and remained the new Colac Herald offices for 57 years.

Mr Woods introduced the first monotype machine to set letterpress which was later replaced with linotype machines.

About the turn of the century, the Colac Herald's editor conceived the idea of setting up a daily newspaper, the Colac Daily News, again providing Colac with three newspapers. He collaborated with Dr J. G. Wynne, Mr R.S. Murray and bank manager Mr R.G. Fincham and hoped that with daily publication he could outsell his rivals the Reformer and the Herald. His plans were not realised and financial problems over the three-year operation of the Colac Daily News led to its eventual closure.

=== 1916-1935 ===
In October 1916, an issue of the Colac Herald containing a First World War honour roll had to be reprinted because it had almost sold out before it hit the streets. It was one of the only country newspapers forced to produce a second edition because of demand.

In 1925 Mr Woods introduced a Norpress rotary press which enabled eight pages of the Herald to be printed on both sides, cut, folded and delivered in one operation.In 1928, John Woods retired as manager of the Colac Herald and business was carried out by family members as a proprietary company. Mr Woods died on March 18, 1929, at the age of 83 having been proprietor of the newspaper for 62 years.

=== 1936-1955 ===
Photographs began appearing on pages during the decade and illustrations began being used in advertisements from time to time.

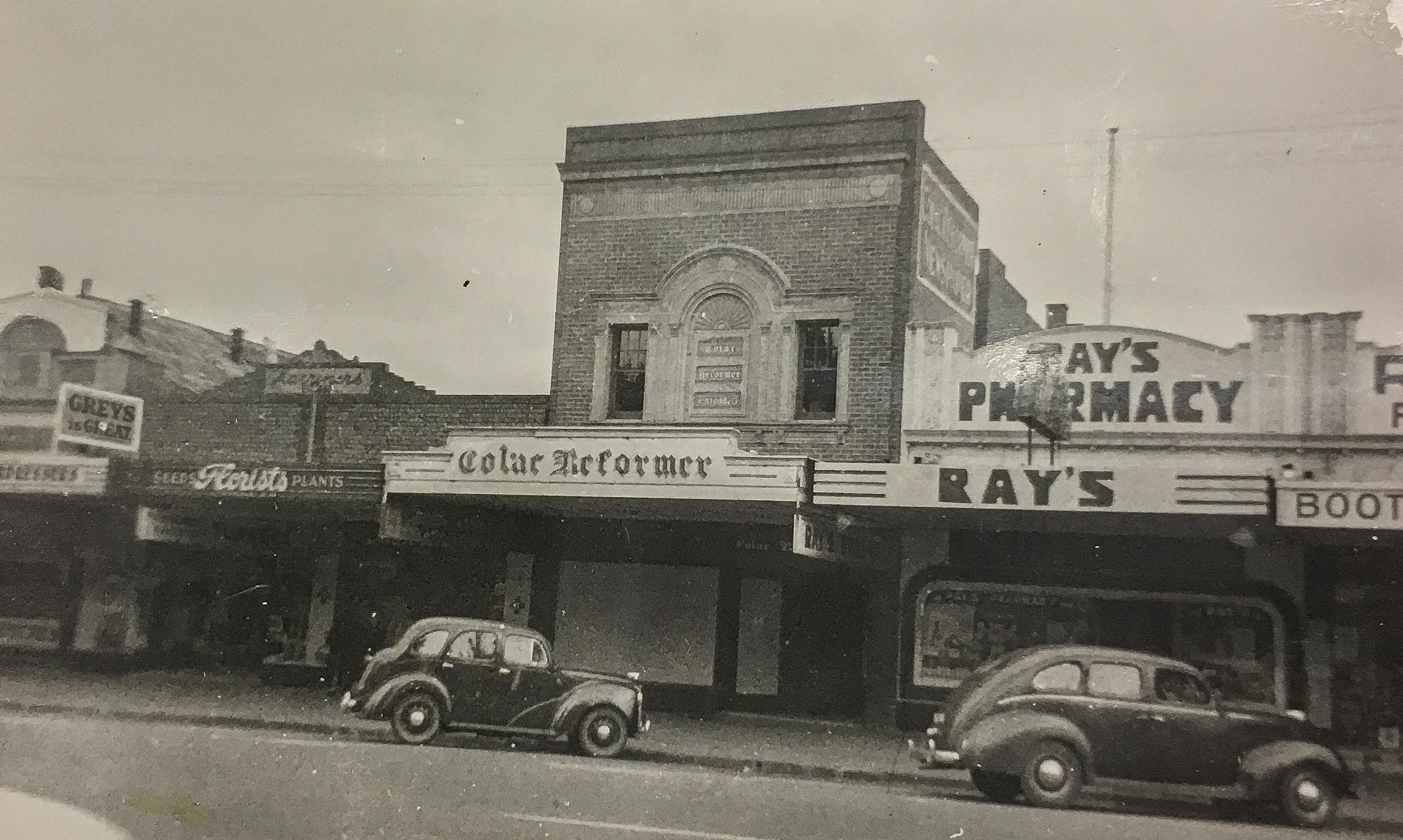
Colac Reformer building, 66 Murray St, Colac (currently Hulm's Bakery)

The Second World War and the monarchy featured in the paper regularly, although The Reformer concentrated more on “news from the front”. In 1948, former Colonel in the British Army Mr Geoffrey. C. Adams bought the Reformer from Mr G. S. Baxter. He then bought the Colac Herald in 1949 and ceased production of the Colac Reformer on September 29.

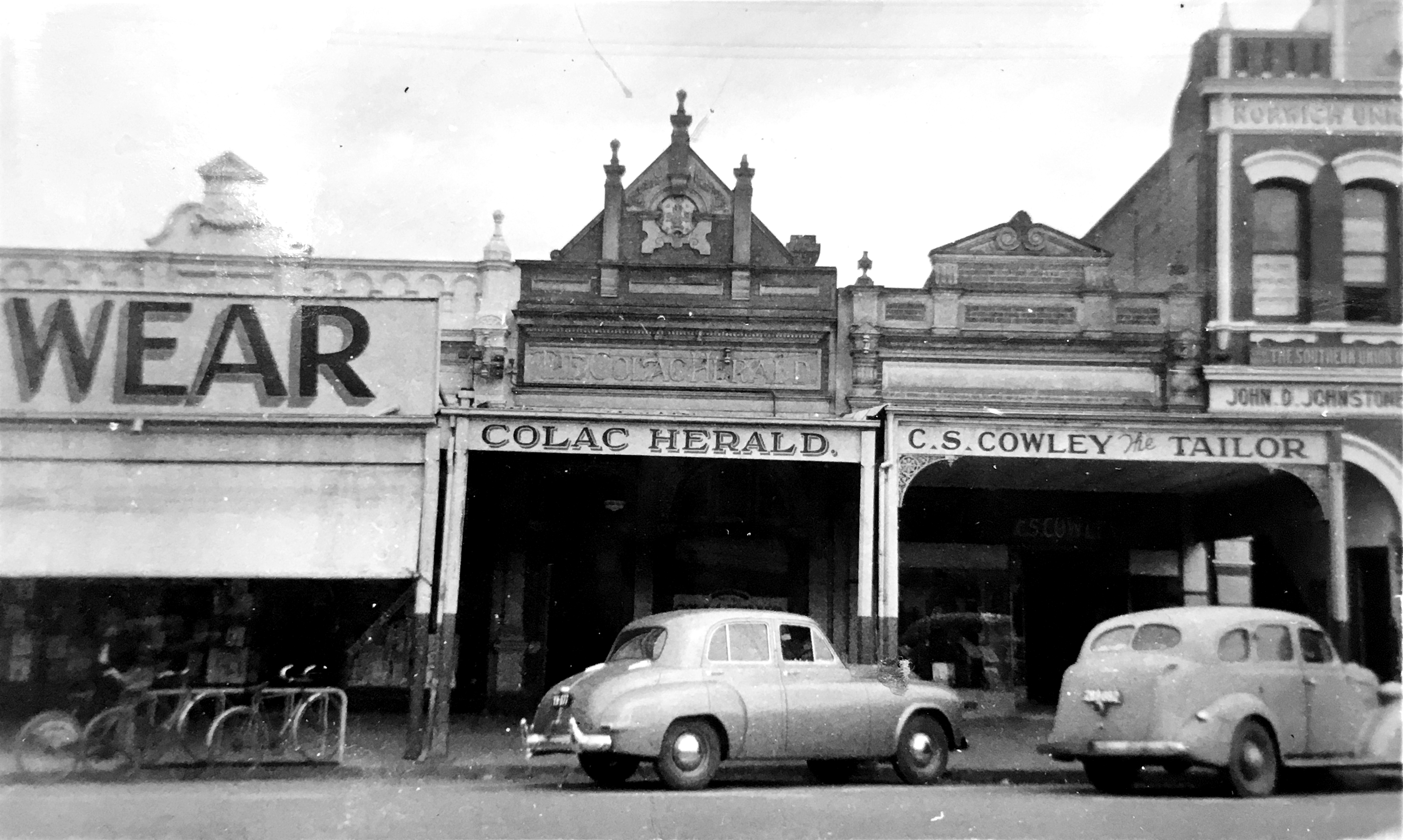
Colac Herald's previous building, 122 Murray St, Colac (currently Brandon's Bakery)

The amalgamation of the two newspapers left Colac with only one publication for the first time since the establishment of The Observer. In 1950, Colac resident Alf Deigan transferred from a clerical position with the Herald to the advertising department, which he managed until 1979. Towards the end of 1954, Mr Adams started negotiations regarding the purchase of land with a frontage to Gellibrand Street, Colac to build a new headquarters for the Herald. Architects for the new building were Mason and Weinstock of East Melbourne. McBean and Co. started digging the foundations on February 7, 1955.

=== 1956-1975 ===
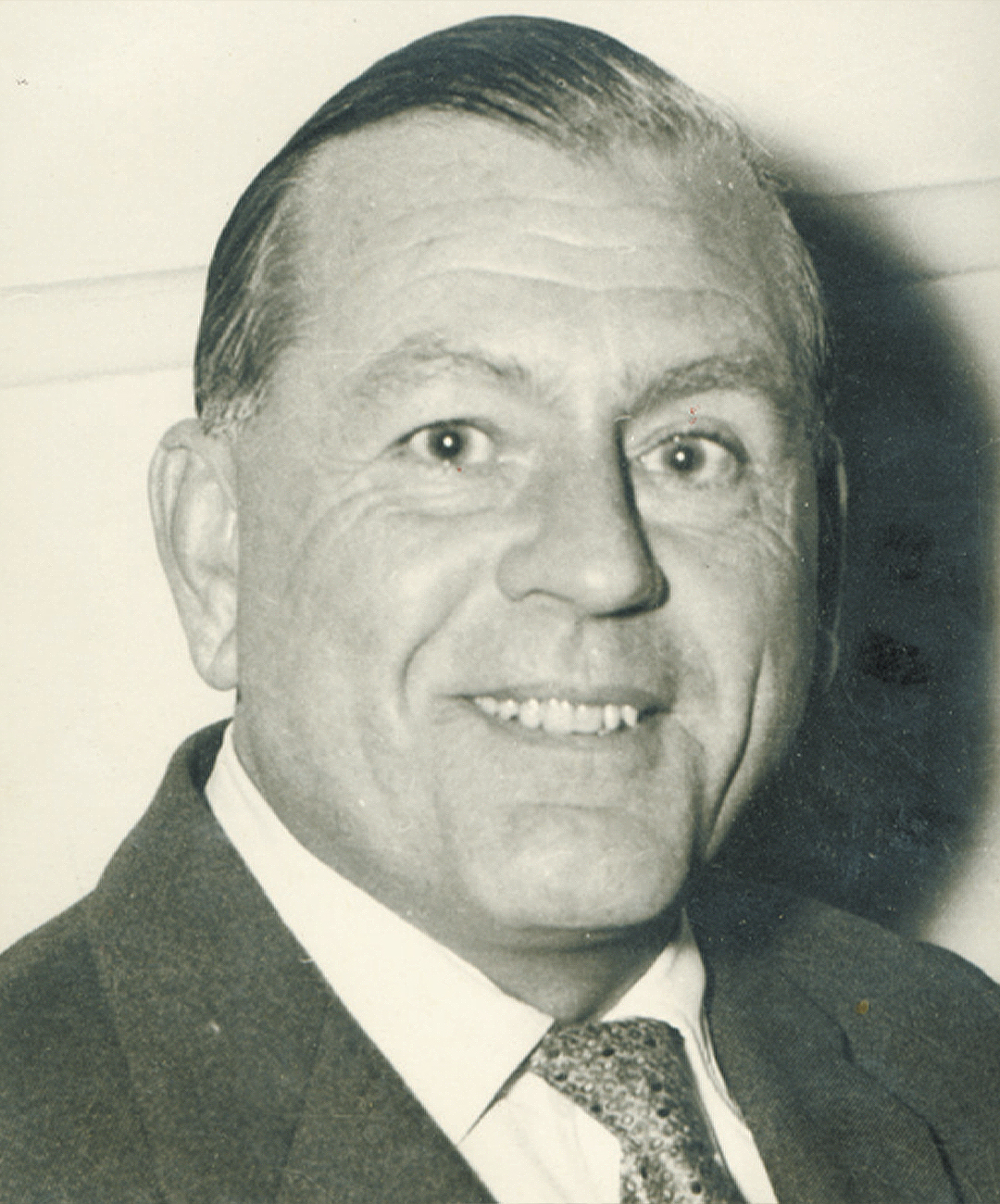
Geoffrey C. Adams 1949 - 1978

Mr Adams moved plant and machinery to a new spacious building on Gellibrand Street in March 1956. The Colac Herald was the first building on the allotment from Johnstone's Lane to Bromfield Street.

On April 20, 1956, the Colac Herald was first printed on the Cossar press, a reel-fed flatbed newspaper printing press. The business continued to expand and more machinery was purchased, creating the need for additional space. Three years after the initial construction, a further 1265 square feet in the floor space was added to the Bromfield Street frontage of the site, and used to accommodate the linotype plant and ancillary equipment. Six years later space again presented problems and another building measuring 3210 square feet was constructed on the Johnstone's Lane side of the building.

In 1958, Frank Williams was employed by Mr Adams to manage the Colac Herald, a position he held for 23 years. The Colac Herald celebrated its centenary in 1966 with the production of a special supplement and a $2000 donation from Mr Adams shared between the three Colac secondary schools and the Colac Youth Club.

=== 1976-1995 ===
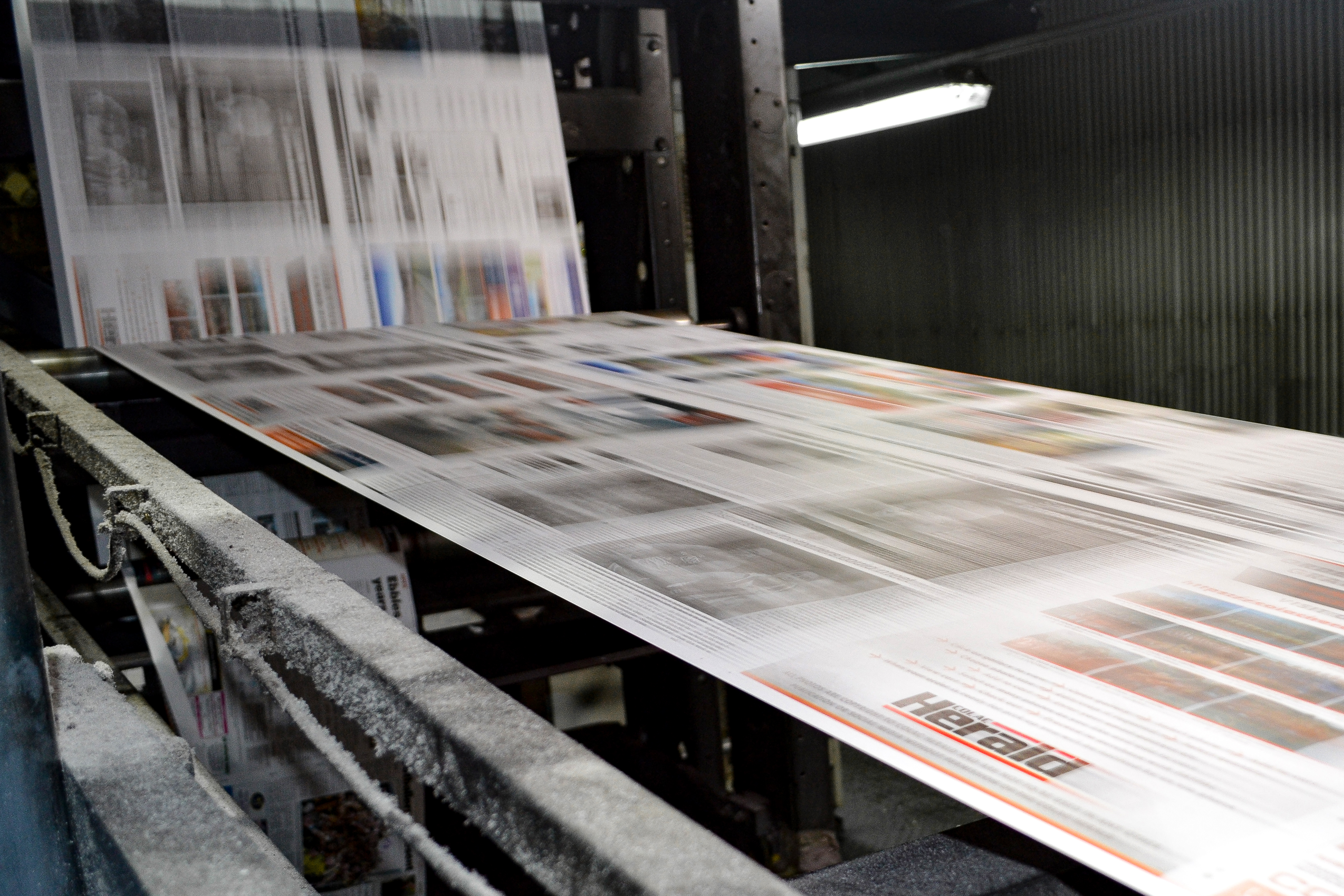
Colac Herald being printed at the Ballarat Rural Press

In 1978 G.C. Adams, who had become a life-member of both the Victorian Country Press Association and Australian Provincial Press, retired and sold the Colac Herald to its third owner, Mr Frank Gannon. Mr Gannon and his family had owned the Leongatha Star, with a long history of newspaper involvement.

Printing of the Colac Herald moved from Colac to Rural Press at Ballarat in August 1979. Mr Gannon personally took over the management of the Herald in 1981, following Mr Williams’ departure. Frank Gannon and his wife Mary continued to own and manage the Colac Herald. Colour printing arrived at the Colac Herald, with the paper's first full-colour front page in March 1994. Colour printing became more and more common in the Colac Herald throughout the 1990s.

=== 1996-2016 ===
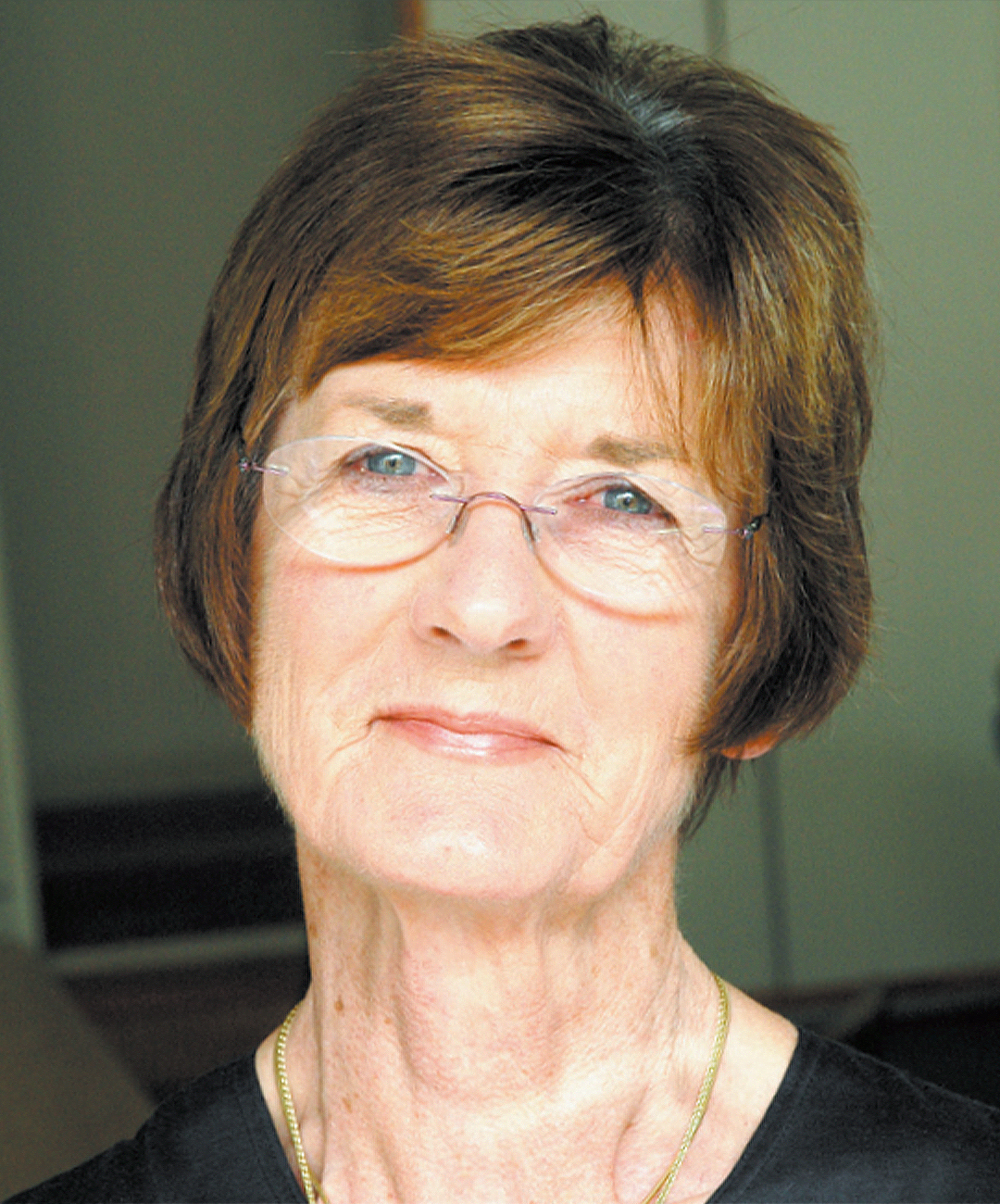
Mary Gannon 2003 - 2011

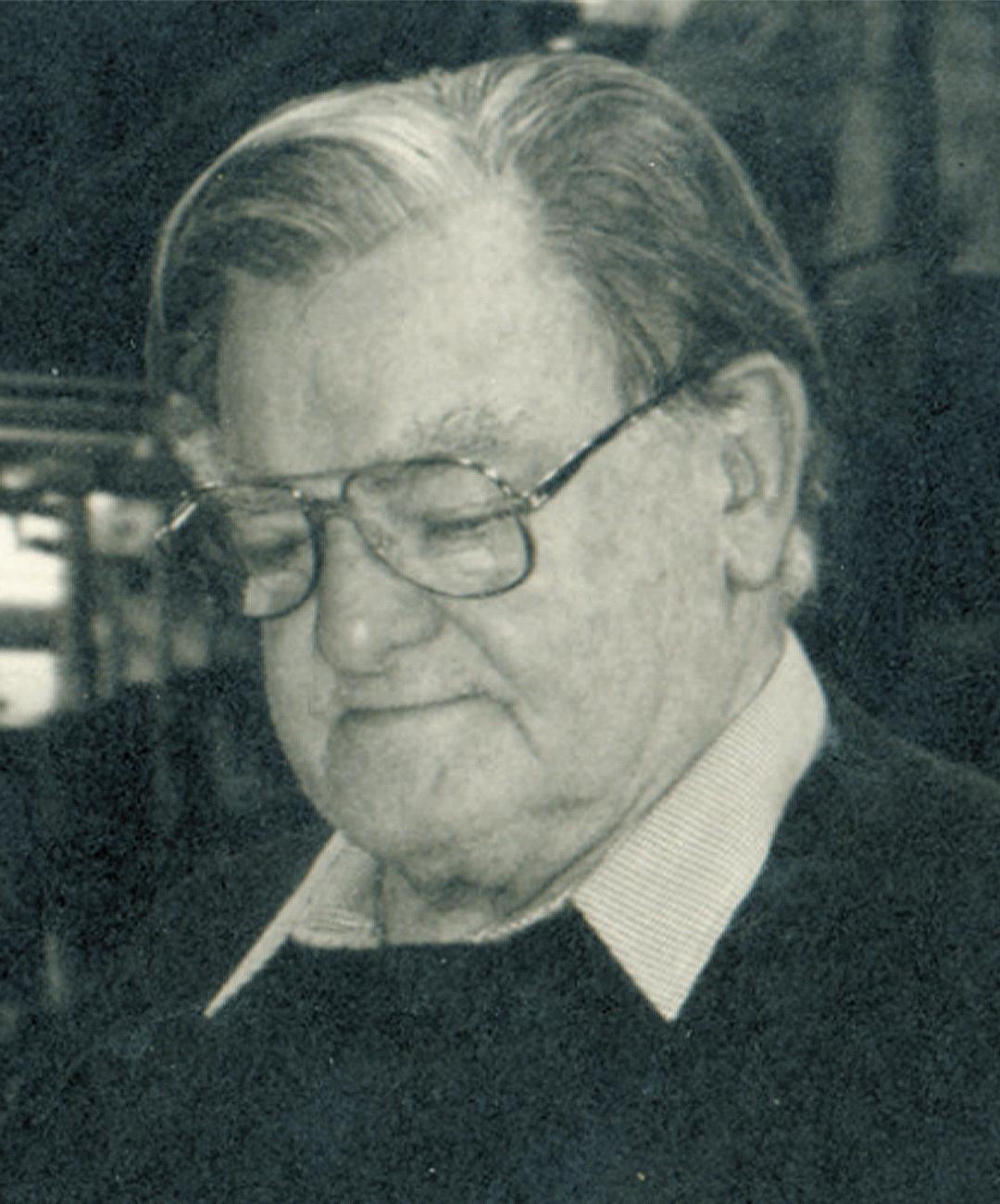
Francis V. Gannon 1978 - 2003

The Gannon family made the decision to transfer the Colac Herald from a broadsheet to the more compact tabloid size, which it remains at today. Steven O’Dowd became editor in 1995 and guided the paper during its transition from broadsheet to tabloid.

Proprietor Frank Gannon became a life member of the Victorian Country Press Association in 1999. He had previously served as the VCPA's chairman in 1972–73. The Herald opened new offices on Bromfield Street, Colac in 1999, consolidating journalists, designers and commercial printing in one building. Bruce Lawson became the Herald's editor in 2003.

Mr Frank Gannon died in January 2003, and his wife Mary Gannon became general manager of the newspaper, continuing the Gannon family's commitment to Colac and district. The Herald's proprietor Mary Gannon made history in 2007 when she became the first woman member of the Victorian Country Press Association's executive council since its establishment in 1910. The Gannon family marked 30 years of ownership of the Herald in 2008 with a special edition celebrating the newspaper's history.

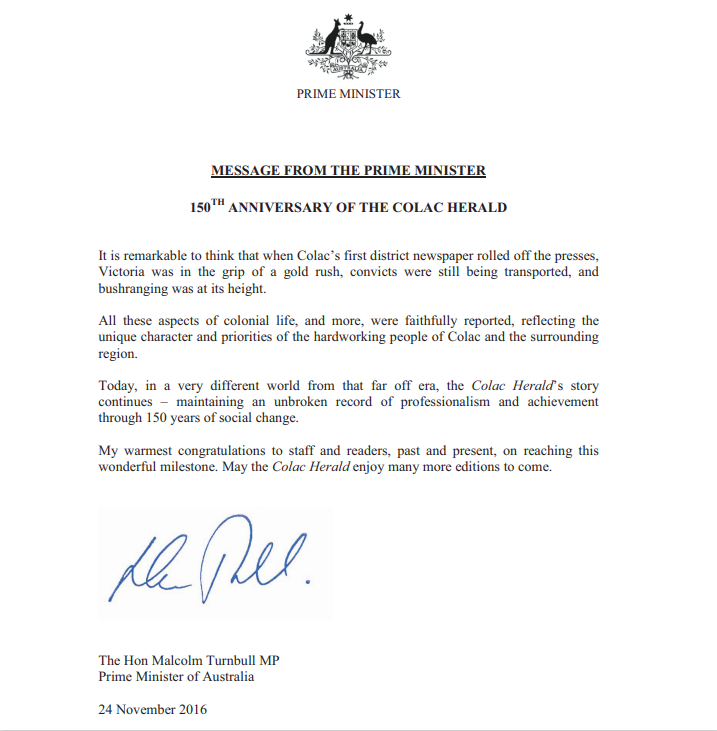
150th Anniversary letter from Prime Minister Malcolm Turnbull

Fairfax Media began publishing a weekly newspaper, the Colac and Corangamite Extra as direct competition to the Herald, but this paper ceased publication in 2009. Catalogues and flyers were inserted into the Colac Herald by hand by Colac Herald staff until the end of 2009. This service moved to Ballarat in 2010.

David McKenzie became editor in November 2010. Former editor Bruce Lawson served as general manager from 2011 until 2014. The Colac Herald underwent a redesign in 2011, with a new look for the masthead and a revamped website. The new design updated the look to a modern typeface while retaining the Herald's traditional colours and bold red lines.

Andrea Graham became general manager in 2014, with Jake Veale taking over as advertising manager, a role Andrea had filled for more than 20 years.

In 2016 the Colac Herald celebrated its 150th anniversary with a letter sent from the Australian Prime Minister at the time Malcolm Turnbull.

=== 2017-2026 ===
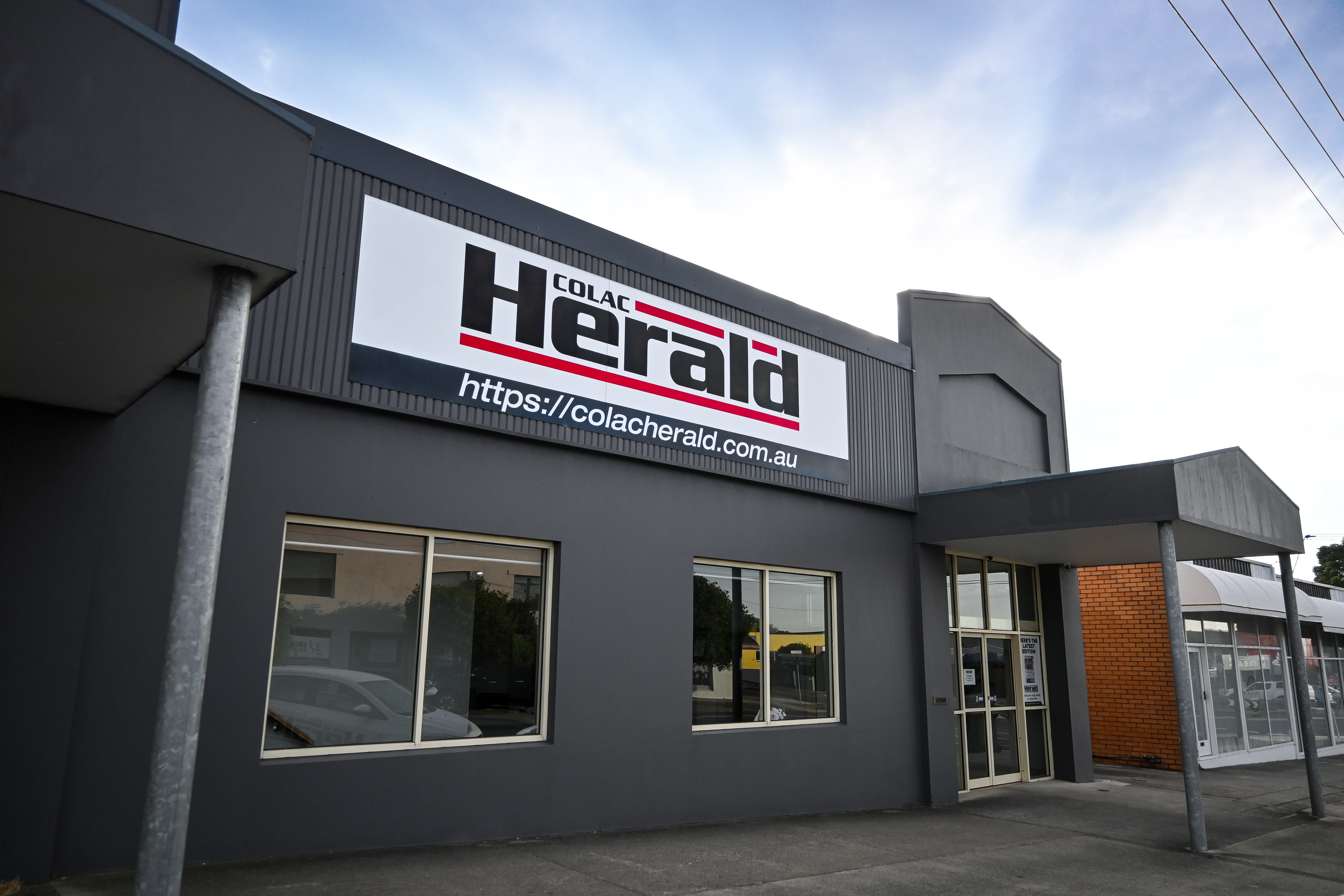
The current Colac Herald building

In March 2017, the Colac Herald was acquired by Greenstone Media Pty Ltd and Andrea Graham became the director and currently still holds that position.

In 2019 the Colac Herald's printing moved from the Ballarat Rural Press to the Latrobe Valley Express.

In 2020 with the effects of lockdown's caused from COVID-19, the Colac Herald was prompted to begin digitising their paper in the form of an online flipbook for users to access remotely on their website.

In 2023 Alison Martin took over David McKenzie's role as editor. Jacob Traynor would then take over in 2024 and Naomi Newcombe in 2026 who remains the Colac Herald's current editor.

In August 2026 the Colac Herald moved from tri-weekly newspaper editions to bi-weekly.

=== Masthead Evolution ===
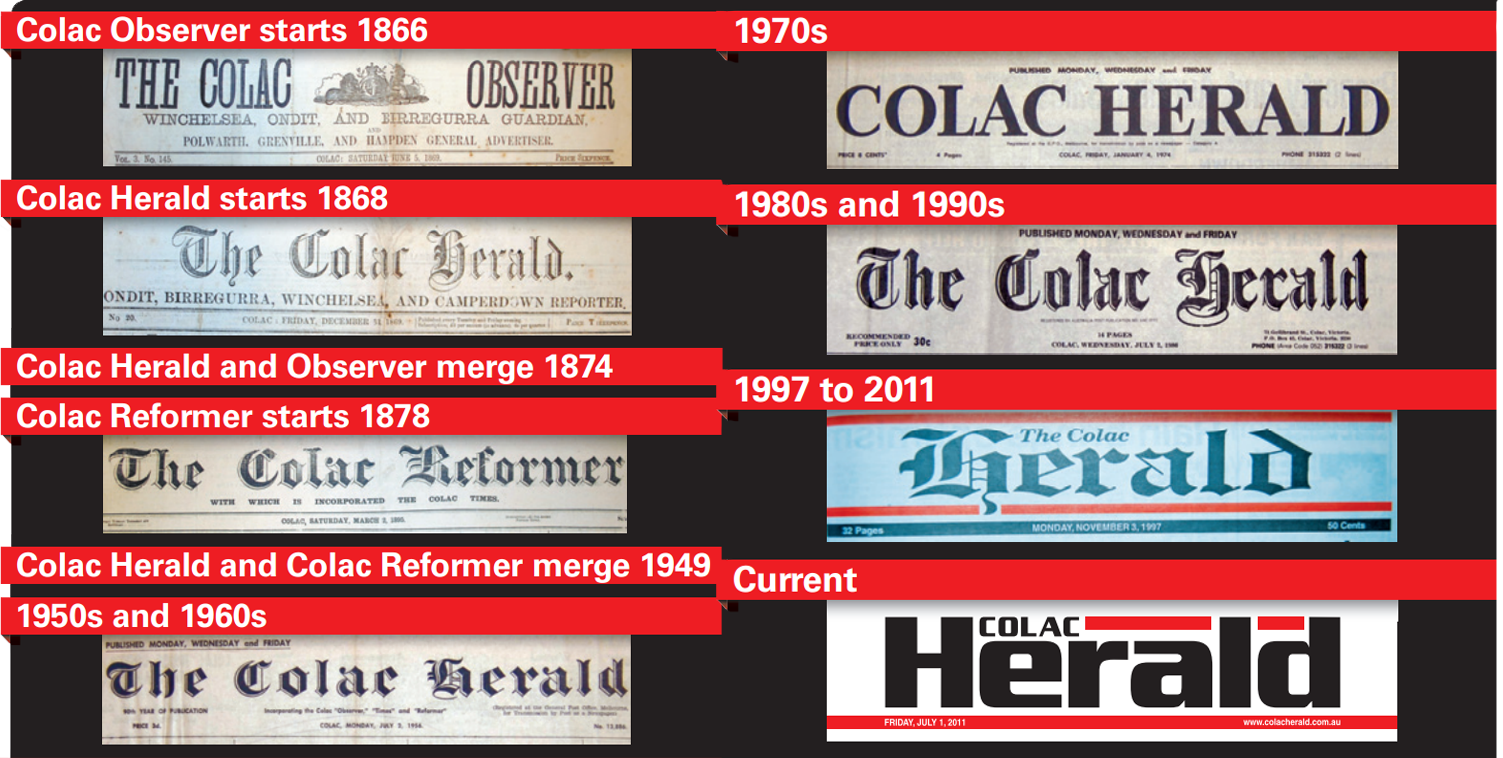

Over its history, the Colac Herald's masthead has undergone several design changes.

Originally featuring a gothic typeface in the 1860s, it transitioned to a simpler style in the 1970s. The most recent redesign occurred in 1997, incorporating red lines and a combination of traditional and modern typefaces.

A subsequent update retained the red lines while introducing a bolder, more contemporary aesthetic. According to production manager Aaron Lamanna, the redesign aimed to maintain the newspaper's established identity while presenting a modernised appearance.

== List of journalists ==
=== Current journalists ===
The below is a list of Colac Herald's current journalists.

| Name | Role | Starting year at Colac Herald |
|---|---|---|
| Naomi Newcombe | Editor, News reporter | 2022 |
| Hannah Toohey | News reporter | 2023 |
| Louis Darcy | Sport reporter | |
| Cooper Hayes | Sport reporter | 2024 |
| Ash Wyss | News reporter | 2026 |
| Molly Inglis | News reporter | 2026 |

== List of staff ==
=== Current working team ===
The below is a list of the Colac Herald's current working staff.

| Name | Role | Starting year at Colac Herald |
|---|---|---|
| Andrea Graham | Director | 1991 |
| Charlie Buchanan | Advertising coordinator | 2023 |
| Madison Old | Advertising coordinator | 2026 |
| Paige Hammond | Admin/Accounts | 2014 |
| Emma Menzies | Print coordinator | 2023 |
| Willem Bubica-Smith | Digital media officer | 2024 |
| Josh Keating | Graphic designer/Production | 2012 |
| Brent Martin | Graphic designer/Production | |
| Jackson Roache | Graphic designer/Production | |
| Clint Gibbs | Photographer/Production | 2025 |

== Features and operations ==
=== Newspaper sections ===
Within the Colac Herald's tri-weekly editions, regularly scheduled sections include:

- News – general local news and analysis
- Sport – general local sporting news, scores and updates
- Classifieds – local advertisements as well as deaths, births and funerals
- Rural Scene – all news relating to the local rural area
- Opinion – letters sent in from the public
- Mayoral Matters – a section for the Colac mayor to write in
- Kids' Corner – kids games and birthday competition with local prizes
- Real Estate – local properties for sale sometimes with an editorial
- Trades & Services – single page of local trades and services available
- Puzzle Page – single page including puzzles, trivia, astrology and comic strips

=== Features ===
Within the Colac Herald's tri-weekly editions, weekly alternating scheduled advertising features include:

- Live Love Local – highlights and promotes local businesses, services and community stories to celebrate and support the Colac Otway region.
- Charity – celebrates charity's across the Colac Otway region.
- Home & Garden – showcases local gardens and homes as well as environmental health, recommendations and upkeep.
- Tradies Talk – a space for Q & A's for local tradies of the area.
- Events & Entertainment – showcases all upcoming local community events.
- Mind, Body & Soul –showcases all health and medical related local businesses
- Next Gear – covers all things motor vehicles, including auto care, road safety and vehicle sales.
- Paddock to Plate – promotes the local meat businesses in the area.
- A Blast from the past – showcases the local businesses past history and advertisements.
- Careers – highlights local employment opportunities around the Colac Otway region which businesses have to offer.
- School Holidays – showcases fun family activities available as well as giveaways related to these activities.

=== Sport Series ===
==== Ahead of the Game ====
Ahead of the Game is a reoccurring segment of the Colac Herald that focuses on local sport around the district. It was originally produced as an individual and separate magazine that would be released at the beginning of the sporting year covering all local sport. In 2025 it was switched from magazine format and instead released as a feature within the Colac Herald's main publication.

==== Game On! ====
Game On! was produced as a weekly web series on the Colac Herald's YouTube channel during 2025, and was hosted by sport journalists Louis Darcy, Cooper Hayes and Jamie Beale.

The current Game On! YouTube series is a revival of a previous digital sport series called Sports Mash created by the Colac Herald that first aired on 6, Dec, 2011 under a separate YouTube channel.

== Awards ==
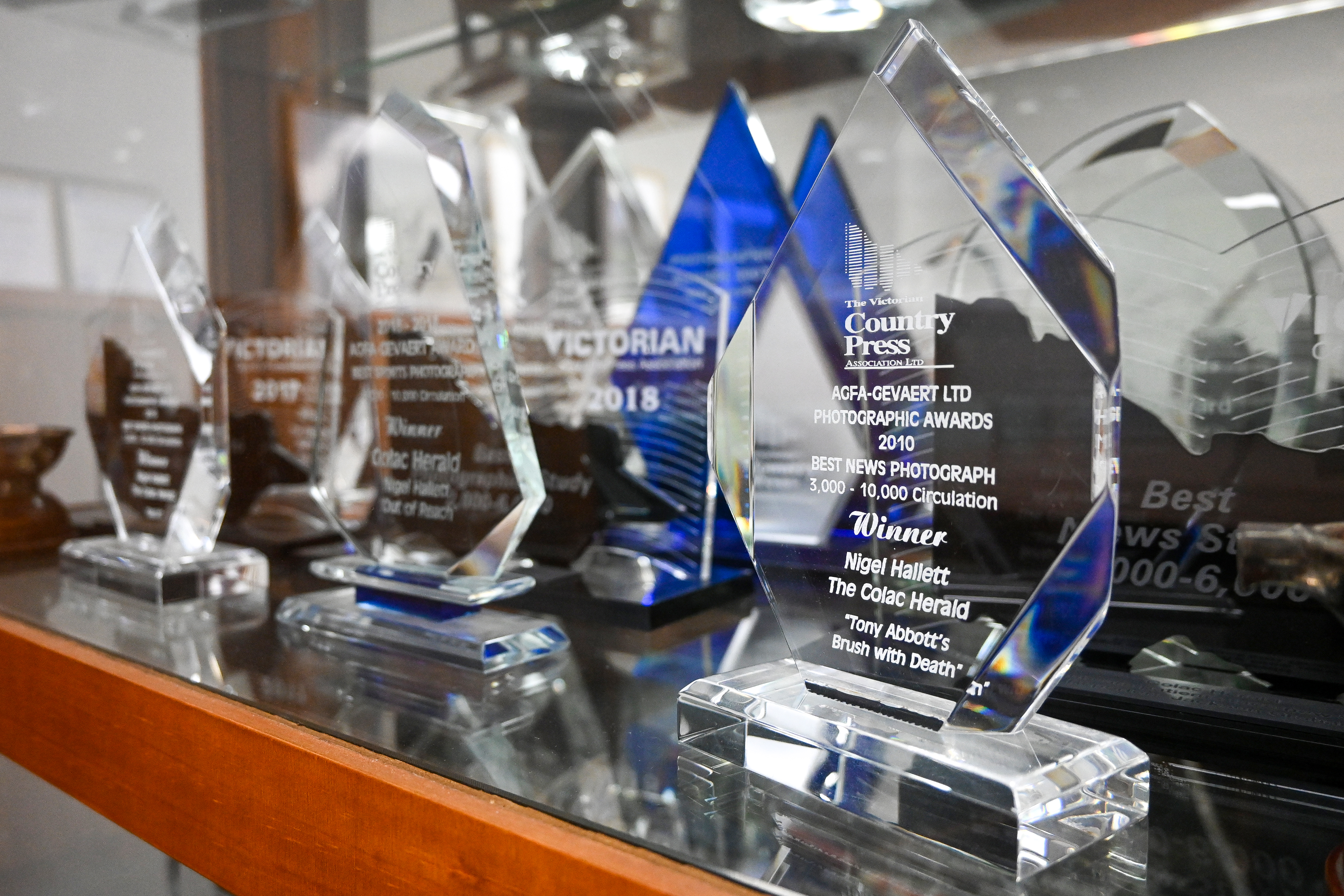
Some of the Colac Herald's Awards

The Colac Herald has received numerous accolades over the years. It has been recognised by the Victorian Country Press Association (VCPA), winning the Overall Newspaper Excellence Award in both 2018 and 2019. It has also received Paper Parley Advertising Awards in 2000 for Best Feature and Best Mono Advertisement.

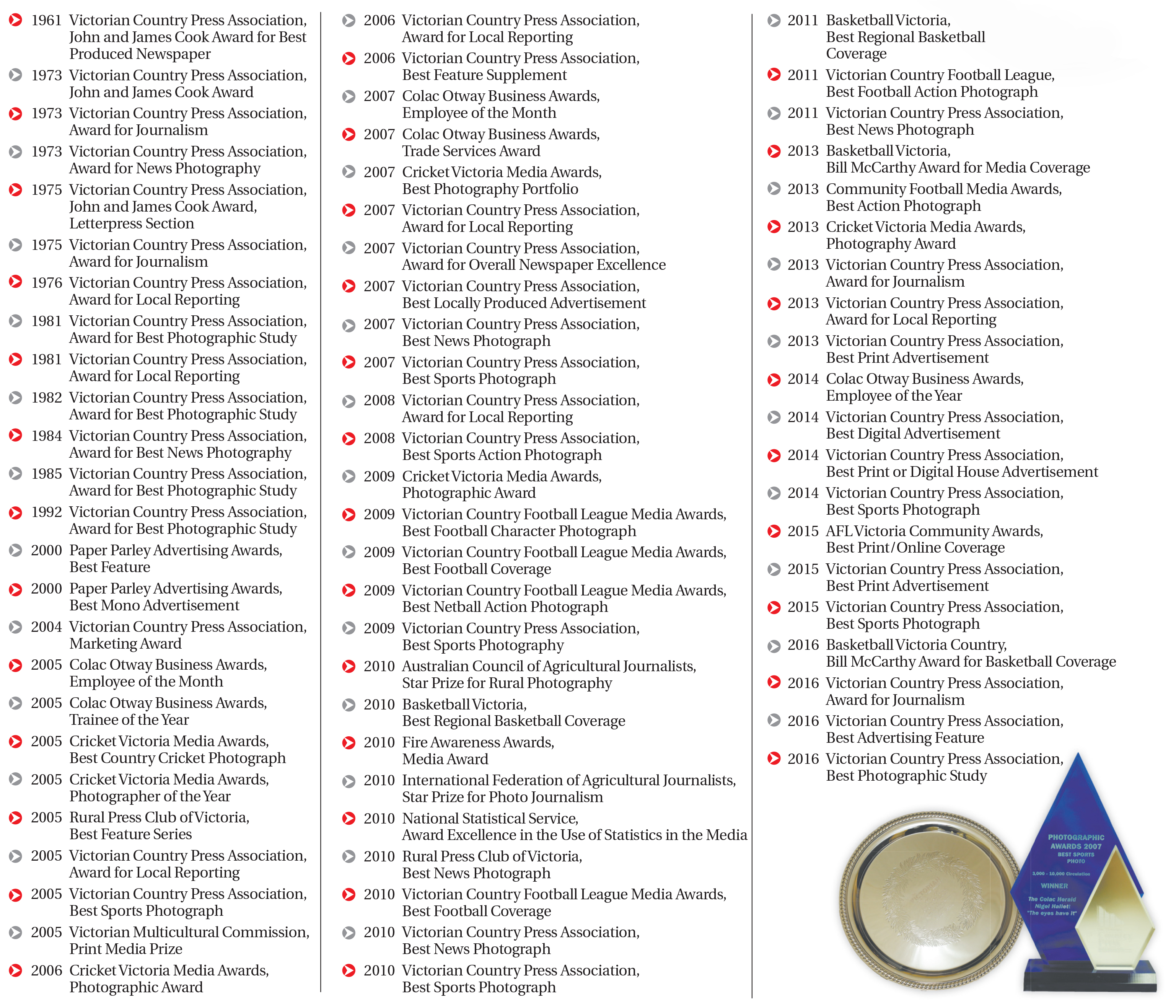
Colac Herald's awards honour roll

There has also been a wide range of cricket, football, netball and basketball awards for photography and news coverage.

In 2018, it also received awards for Best Photographic Study and Best News Story, along with several commendations in journalism, advertising, and photography.

An honour roll list of all the Colac Herald's awards up until 2016. This is taken from a page of the Herald's 2016 150th anniversary edition newspaper.
