= Otway Coast =

The Otway Coast comprises a popular beach and national park section of the Great Ocean Road on the south-eastern coast of Australia between the Victorian towns of Lorne and Apollo Bay. The townships on the Otway Coast are: Separation Creek, Wye River, Kennett River, Wongara and Sugarloaf.

== History ==
The Otway Coast region became a popular holiday destination from the city of Melbourne in Victoria after the returned servicemen from World War 1 built a spectacular stretch of road along some of the state's most precipitous cliffs. The townships of the Otway Coast were all settled in the late 1800s but only became popular as beach resorts when the Great Ocean Road was opened in 1932. They differ from the other townships along the coast in that they are smaller and less developed.

On 25 December 2015 a bushfire destroyed 18 homes in Separation Creek and at Wye River 98 homes were destroyed. There were no deaths at either town.

== Koala populations ==
The Otway Coast has one of the most successful wild koala populations in Australia with their numbers increasing every year due to the high percentage of available suitable vegetation like manna gum and blue gum.

== National parks ==
A significant area of the Otway Coast belongs to the Great Otway National Park with many walking tracks and waterfalls. The Park features the magnificent trees of the ancient rainforests, the drier forests of the inland slopes and the very diverse heathlands and woodlands along with spectacularly rugged coastline. During winter it has some of Victoria's most striking waterfalls.
