= Petticoat Creek, Victoria =

Petticoat Creek
- Town
- Coordinates: 38°42′49″S 143°43′55″E
- Country: Australia
- State: Victoria
- LGA: Colac Otway Shire
- Location: 7 km (4.3 mi) NE of Apollo Bay; 83 km (52 mi) SW of Geelong; 147 km (91 mi) SW of Melbourne

Government
  - State electorate: Polwarth
  - Federal division: Wannon

Population
  - Total: 0 (2016 census)
- Postcode: 3233
Localities around Petticoat Creek
Skenes Creek	Skenes Creek	Wongarra
Skenes Creek	Petticoat Creek	Wongarra
Bass Strait	Bass Strait	Bass Strait

Petticoat Creek is a locality in the Shire of Colac Otway, Victoria, Australia. In the 2011 census, the population of Petticoat Creek was too low to report separately; however in November 2014 the Victorian Electoral Commission recorded two enrolled voters in Petticoat Creek, living in two properties.

The locality reportedly derives its name from the family of a settler, Henry Mutlow Biddle, who had eight daughters who used to hang their petticoats to dry out by the creek that ran past their house.

The Great Ocean Road runs through the locality, and is the only road in the area. The beach at Petticoat Creek is dominated by a rock platform, but with enough sand behind it for sunbathing and picnicking. Surf Life Saving Australia states that the area is "a very hazardous section of coast" for swimming. They also state that the rock platforms can only be safely used for fishing at low tide.

The Kookaburra Cottages tourist accommodation is based at Petticoat Creek.
