= Grey River, Victoria =

Grey River
- Town
- Coordinates: 38°40′50″S 143°50′06″E
- Country: Australia
- State: Victoria
- LGA: Colac Otway Shire
- Location: 44 km (27 mi) SE of Colac; 74 km (46 mi) SW of Geelong; 138 km (86 mi) SW of Melbourne

Government
  - State electorate: Polwarth
  - Federal division: Wannon

Population
  - Total: 0 (2016 census)
- Postcode: 3234
Localities around Grey River
Wongarra	Wongarra	Kennett River
Wongarra	Grey River	Bass Strait
Wongarra	Wongarra	Bass Strait

Grey River is a locality in the Shire of Colac Otway, Victoria, Australia. It lies on the Great Ocean Road at the mouth of the Grey River, from which it derives its name.

Grey River Beach is located in the area, and contains car parking and picnic facilities. Surf Life Saving Australia notes that the beach "is often more boulder than sand" and "unsuitable for safe bathing, apart from in the protected tidal pools at high tide." The coastline in this area is commonly used for rock fishing.

In 1918, it was reported that the mouth of the Grey River would be renamed "Suvla Bay", among a number of other Great Ocean Road locations renamed after World War I battlefields. The name did not stick in common use and was never formally gazetted.

In December 2015, the locality was briefly evacuated due to the bushfires that severely damaged nearby Wye River and Separation Creek, and was subject to numerous bushfire warnings in the following days as serious fears were held that the fire, at the time still out of control, would burn in its direction.
