= Wye River Beach =

Beach in Victoria, Australia

Whites Beach
- Beach
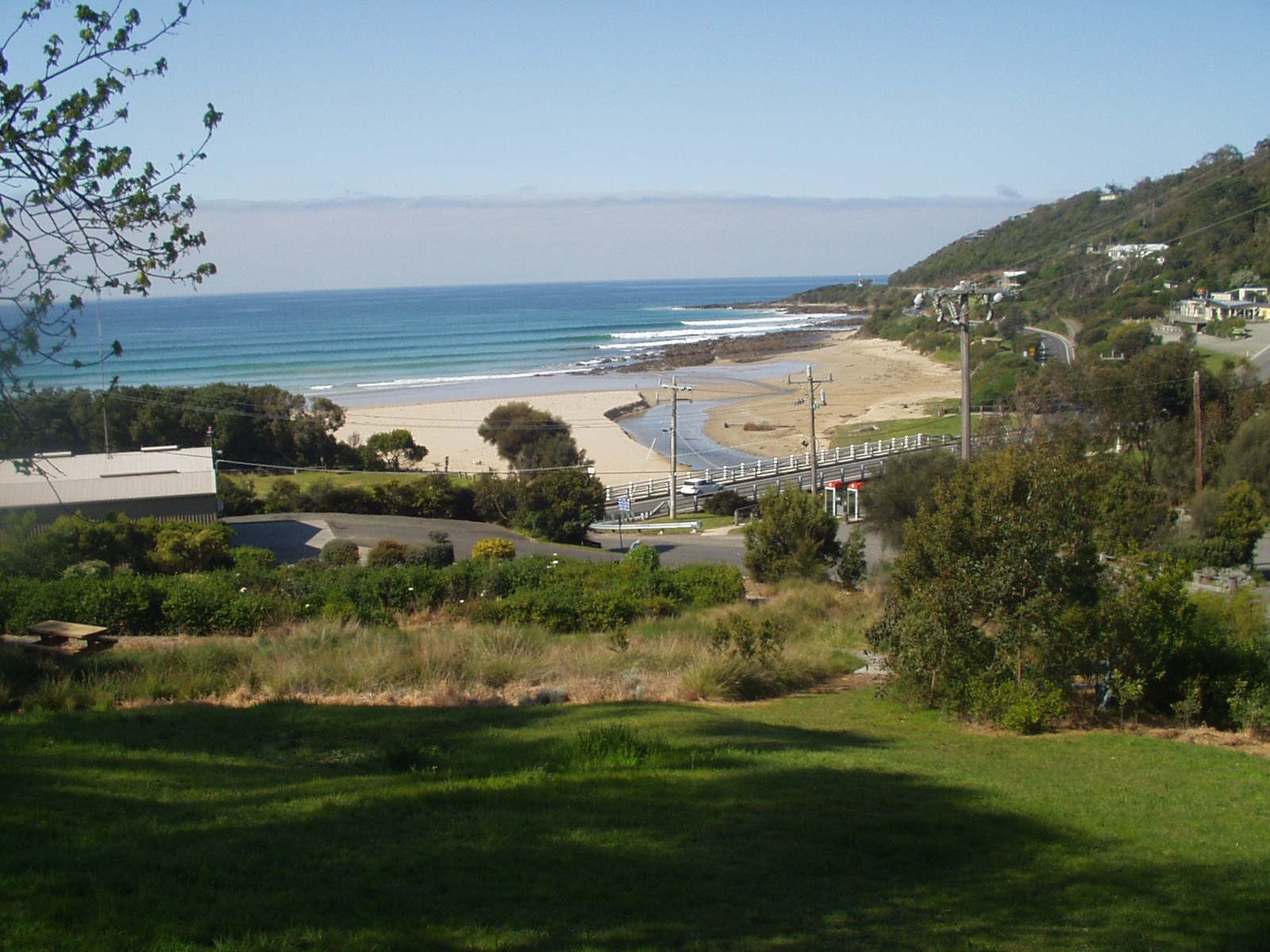
- Wye River Beach
- Interactive map of Whites Beach
- Coordinates: 38°38′05″S 143°53′31″E
- Location: Torquay, Victoria, Australia
- Water bodies: Bass Strait

Dimensions
  - Length: 0.2 kilometres (0.12 mi)
- Hazard rating: 7/10 (highly hazardous)
- Access: The Esplanade

Wye River Beach is a beach located at the township of Wye River on the Great Ocean Road in Victoria, Australia. Formed at the mouth of the Wye River, the beach extends for approximately 200 metres between rocky headlands and is backed by the township, the Great Ocean Road and a foreshore reserve. It is a popular destination for swimming, surfing and fishing, with seasonal patrols provided by the Wye River Surf Life Saving Club.

== History ==
Wye River remained relatively isolated until around 1900, when the Harrington brothers constructed the settlement's first jetty to support shipping and the local timber industry. The original structure proved too short and too shallow for practical use, prompting the construction of a second, larger jetty built across the nearby rock platform. The improved jetty enabled sawmilling operations to commence, although only remnants of the structure survive today.

Despite the new infrastructure, shipping at Wye River remained unreliable because vessels frequently had to wait extended periods for calm seas before they could safely load or unload cargo. The original sawmill ceased operating in 1912, and although new owners later revived the business, it permanently closed after financial difficulties in 1918.

A major flood in 1923 destroyed the tramway bridge spanning the Wye River, while a storm later washed away much of the jetty. Today, the remaining pier piles, rusted railway tracks and remnants of the former winching equipment provide evidence of the settlement's early maritime and timber industries.

In January 2026, severe flash flooding of the Wye River resulting in major damage to the caravan park and adjacent area, with cars, caravans and other debris floating out to sea.

== Description ==
Wye River Beach occupies the mouth of the Wye River, where sand deposited by the river forms a small beach enclosed by sandstone rock platforms and reefs at either end. The beach faces southeast and is bordered by steep valley slopes, with the Great Ocean Road, a caravan park and the Wye River Surf Life Saving Club situated immediately behind the foreshore.

The beach receives average wave heights of around 1.4 metres and contains a broad, gently sloping sandbar. Strong permanent rip currents occur adjacent to the rocky headlands, making the beach potentially hazardous for swimmers despite its relatively small size. Visitors are advised to remain between the patrol flags in the central section of the beach, where lifesavers operate during the summer season. The Wye River Surf Life Saving Club, established in 1958, averages around 26 rescues each year.

Wye River Beach is used for a range of recreational activities, including swimming, surfing, fishing and beach walking. The main beach offers gentler conditions that are suitable for less experienced surfers under smaller swells, while larger waves near the point provide more challenging conditions. The adjoining river mouth also provides calmer water for children, and visitors can explore rock pools and the remains of the historic jetty along the shoreline. Fishing is popular from the river, the beach and the surrounding rock platforms.

== See also ==
- Thirteenth Beach
- Torquay Surf Beach
- Torquay Front Beach
- Jan Juc Beach
- Great Ocean Road
