= Barwon Downs =

- Town
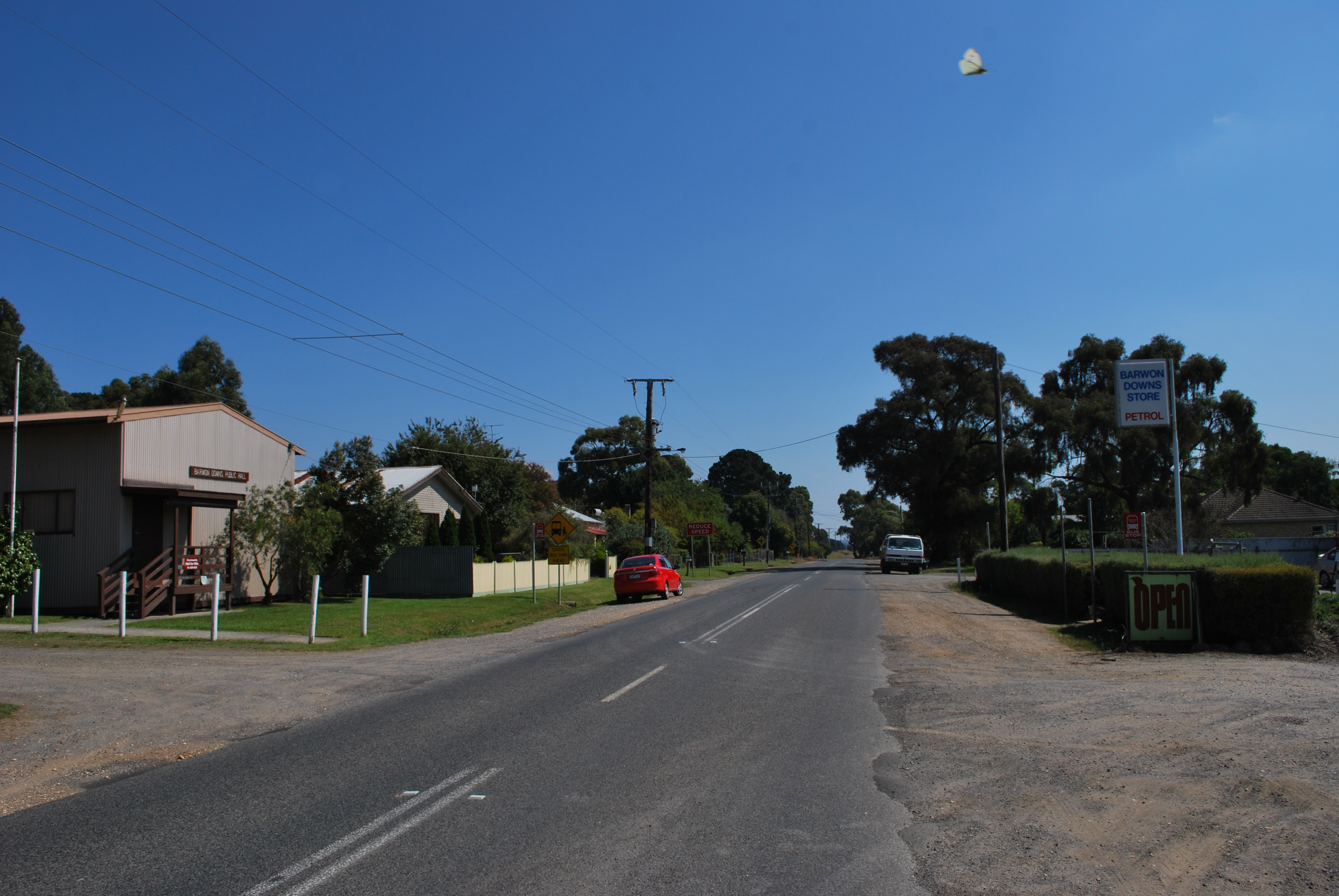
- The main street of Barwon Downs with the public hall on the left and the general store on the right (now closed)

- Coordinates: 38°28′0″S 143°45′0″E
- Country: Australia
- State: Victoria
- LGA: Colac Otway Shire
- Location: 151 km (94 mi) SW of Melbourne; 75 km (47 mi) SW of Geelong; 30 km (19 mi) SE of Colac

Government
  - State electorate: Polwarth
  - Federal division: Wannon

Population
  - Total: 136 (SAL 2021)
- Postcode: 3243
Localities around Barwon Downs
Gerangamete	Murroon	Pennyroyal
Forrest	Barwon Downs	Benwerrin; Lorne
Barramunga	Barramunga	Separation Creek

Barwon Downs is a town in Victoria, Australia. The town is located in the foothills of the Otway Ranges, 151 kilometres (94 mi) south west of the state capital, Melbourne. The township was proclaimed on 10 May 1910. In the 2016 census, Barwon Downs had a population of 131.

The main industries in the area are agriculture, forestry and tourism. The town has a church, tennis courts and public hall. Barwon Downs also has a local Country Fire Authority (CFA) with members from the local community. Since the 1990s an aquifer in the Barwon Downs area have been used as a supply of water for Geelong in periods of drought.

Barwon Downs Primary School opened on 11 July 1888, was rebuilt in 1911 and 1965 and closed on 31 December 1993. Barwon Downs Post Office opened on 24 September 1888 and closed on 29 November 1975.
