= Sugarloaf, Victoria =

Sugarloaf
- Town
- Coordinates: 38°41′24″S 143°47′49″E
- Country: Australia
- State: Victoria
- LGA: Colac Otway Shire
- Location: 44 km (27 mi) SE of Colac; 78 km (48 mi) SW of Geelong; 141 km (88 mi) SW of Melbourne

Government
  - State electorate: Polwarth
  - Federal division: Wannon

Population
  - Total: 20 (SAL 2021)
- Postcode: 3234
Localities around Sugarloaf
Wongarra	Wongarra	Wongarra
Wongarra	Sugarloaf	Wongarra
Bass Strait	Bass Strait	Bass Strait

Sugarloaf is a locality in the Shire of Colac Otway, Victoria, Australia. In the 2011 census, the population of Sugarloaf was too low to separately report; however in November 2014 the Victorian Electoral Commission recorded 10 enrolled voters in Sugarloaf, living in 9 properties.

The locality is centred on a 30m high sand dune along the Great Ocean Road, and derives its name from an observation that it looked like a sugarloaf. It sits at the mouth of the Sugarloaf Creek, and fronts onto a cove known locally as Onion Bay. Sugarloaf is completely surrounded on land by the larger locality of Wongarra.

A former Redemptionist Fathers monastery is located at Sugarloaf. After its closure, it operated as short-term accommodation for people living with mental illness through Mind Australia. The property was sold in 2012, and has since operated as the Seacroft holiday accommodation. The "Stephanie's at Onion Bay" holiday apartments are also located at Sugarloaf.
