= Tanybryn =

Coordinates: 38°39′30″S 143°42′50″E

- Suburb
- Country: Australia
- State: Victoria
- LGA: Colac Otway Shire

Government
  - State electorate: Polwarth
  - Federal division: Wannon

Population
  - Total: 15 (SAL 2021)
- Postcode: 3249
Suburbs around Tanybryn
Barramunga	Barramunga	Mount Sabine
Beech Forest	Tanybryn	Wongarra
Apollo Bay	Skenes Creek	Wongarra

Tanybryn is a locality in Victoria, Australia, situated in the Shire of Colac Otway. In the 2016 census, Tanybryn had a population of 19.

Tanybryn State School opened in 1929 and closed in 1954.

A postal receiving office opened at Tanybryn on 16 February 1915 and closed on 26 November 1920. A full post office then opened on 1 July 1936 and closed on 30 November 1970.
