= Geoffrey Adams (cricketer) =

English cricketer and newspaper director

Personal information
- Full name: Geoffrey Coker Arding Adams
- Born: 24 May 1909; Hampstead, London, England
- Died: 10 February 1998 (aged 88); Geelong, Victoria, Australia
- Batting: Right-handed
- Bowling: Right-arm medium-pace

Domestic team information
- Years: Team
- 1928–1930: Hampshire

Career statistics
Competition	First-class
Matches	18
Runs scored	421
Batting average	13.58
100s/50s	–/–
Top score	42
Balls bowled	283
Wickets	4
Bowling average	40.50
5 wickets in innings	–
10 wickets in match	–
Best bowling	1/0
Catches/stumpings	3/–
- Source: Cricinfo, 21 September 2009

Geoffrey Coker Arding Adams MBE (24 May 1909 — 10 February 1998) was an English first-class cricketer and newspaper proprietor.

The son of Hugh Geoffrey Coker Adams, he was born at Hampstead in May 1909. He was educated at Radley College, before matriculating to Pembroke College, Cambridge. Although a member of the Cambridge University Cricket Club, he did not feature for the first eleven. However, he did gain a blue playing rugby union for Cambridge University R.U.F.C. During his summer holiday from Cambridge, Adams played first-class cricket for Hampshire, making his debut against Worcestershire in the 1928 County Championship. Having played once in 1928, he made a further twelve appearances in 1929 and five in 1930. In eighteen first-class matches for Hampshire, Adams had modest success as a middle-order batsman. He scored 421 runs at an average of 13.58, with a highest score of 42.

Adams married Betty Clover in June 1935 at Whitegate, Cheshire. He later served in the Second World War with the British Army, being commissioned into the Royal Welch Fusiliers as a second lieutenant in March 1940. Following the war, he resigned his commission in January 1946 having reached the war substantive rank of major and was granted the honorary rank of lieutenant colonel. He followed in his fathers footsteps by emigrating to Australia, where he built a newspaper group in rural Victoria. He was instrumental in preserving papers concerning the 1932–33 Bodyline tour. For his services to publishing in Victoria, Adams was made an MBE in the 1969 Birthday Honours. He died at Geelong in February 1998.
