= Kennett River, Victoria =

Town in Victoria, Australia

Kennett River
- Town
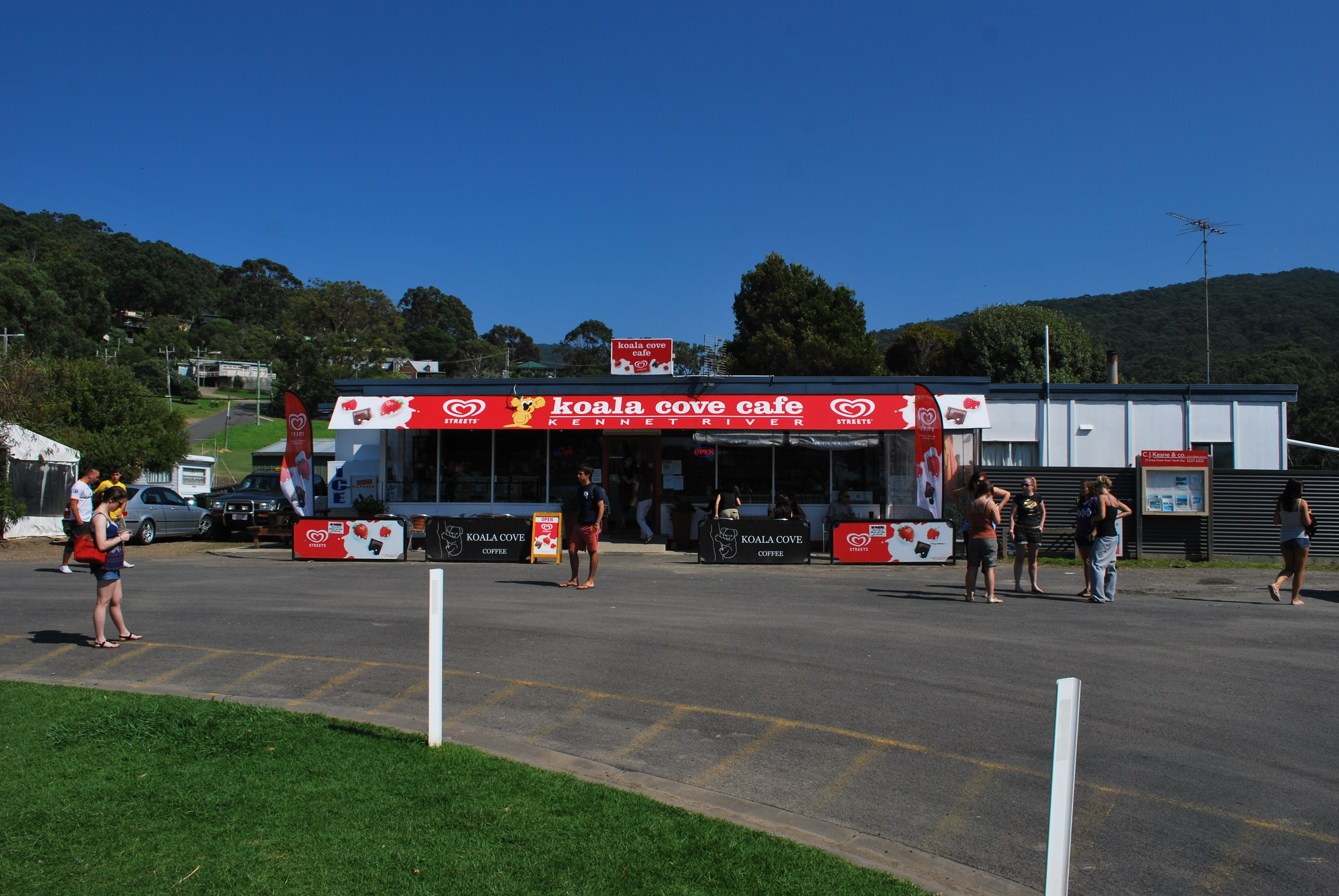
- Koala Cove Cafe

- Coordinates: 38°40′0″S 143°51′0″E
- Country: Australia
- State: Victoria
- LGA: Colac Otway Shire
- Location: 174 km (108 mi) SW of Melbourne; 100 km (62 mi) SW of Geelong; 44 km (27 mi) SE of Colac; 27 km (17 mi) SW of Lorne

Government
  - State electorate: Polwarth
  - Federal division: Wannon

Population
  - Total: 74 (2021 census)
- Postcode: 3234
Localities around Kennett River
Barramunga	Wye River	Wye River
Barramunga	Kennett River	Bass Strait
Mount Sabine	Wongarra	Grey River

Kennett River is a town in Colac Otway Shire, Victoria, Australia.

Situated 174 kilometres (108 mi) west of Melbourne, on the Otway Coast portion of the scenic Great Ocean Road, Kennett River is a popular tourist destination 27 kilometres (17 mi) from the resort town of Lorne, Victoria.

== History ==
The river running through the town was named by surveyor George Smythe after the River Kennet in Berkshire, England.

In 1882, Alex MacLennan and his cousins, the MacReas, were looking for an area suited to farming and fishing. MacLennan chose this site, which he named The Kennet. His cousins settled on the other side of the creek at a site named Wye River.

Kennett River Post Office opened on 15 December 1938 and closed in about 1984.

A sawmill was established in 1939 by Mr S. Armistead. The mill closed in 1967, but remants of the mill structure can be seen, and sawdust piles can still be seen on the beach.

== Tourism ==
The area is known for its beach, scenic coastal views, whale watching, the Great Otway National Park, and surfing. Although koala populations have declined across the country, Kennett River is still considered one of the best places in Australia to see them in the wild. The Victoria State Government has implemented plans in the Cape Otway area to manage the koala population and improve their health, though some of the actions taken have been controversial.

The area is also home to a variety of birds, including cockatoos, parrots, rosellas, owls, and kookaburras, and to glow-worms.

Kennett River has a Surf Lifesaving Club (SLSC) that was established in 1963.

== See also ==
- Kennett River Beach
