= Wye River, Victoria =

Wye River
- Town
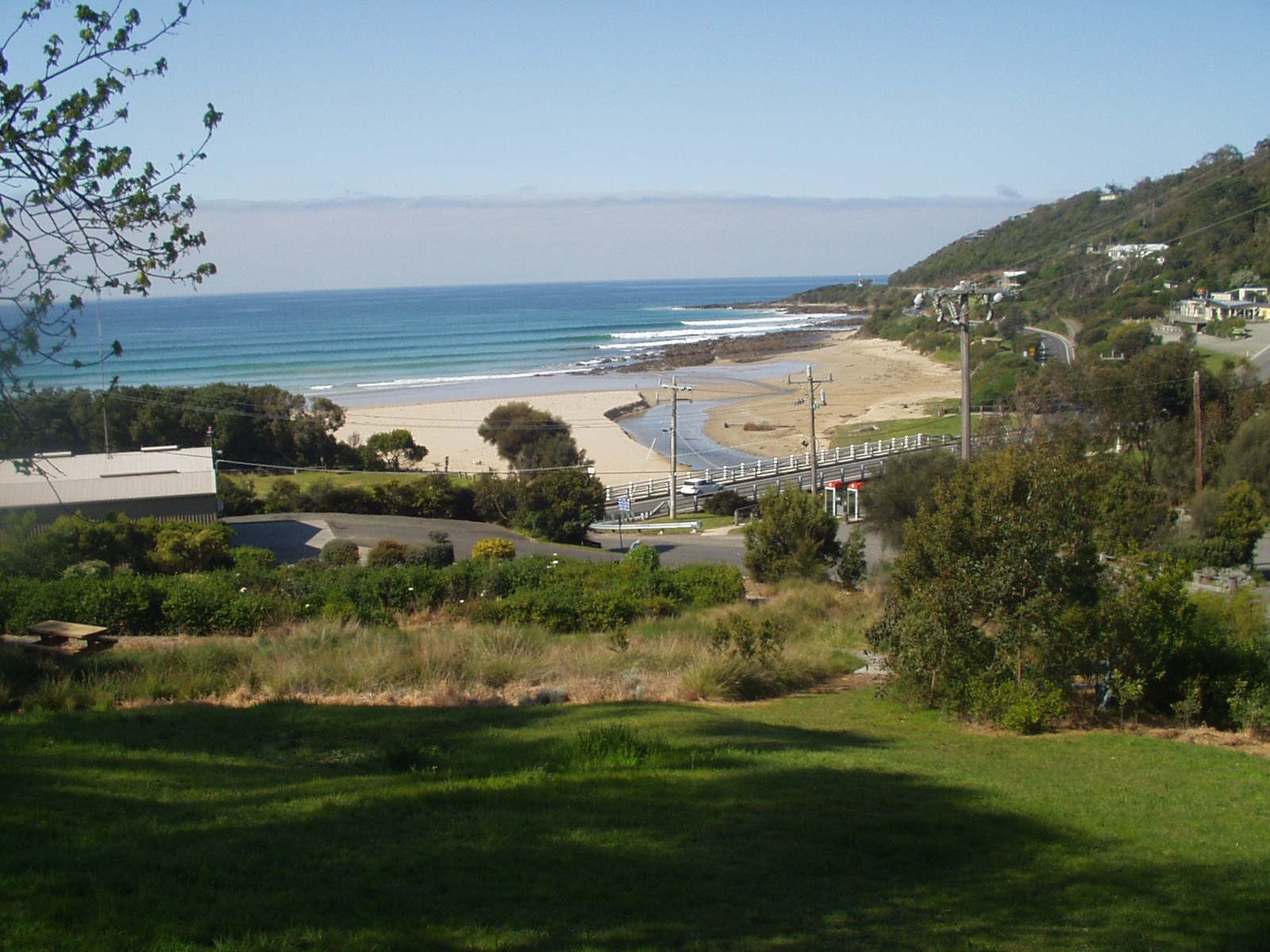
- Looking South over Wye River Township towards the beach

- Coordinates: 38°38′0″S 143°53′0″E
- Country: Australia
- State: Victoria
- LGA: Colac Otway Shire
- Location: 164 km (102 mi) SW of Melbourne; 89 km (55 mi) SW of Geelong; 22 km (14 mi) SW of Lorne

Government
  - State electorate: Polwarth
  - Federal division: Wannon

Population
  - Total: 67 (2021 census)
- Postcode: 3234
Localities around Wye River
Barramunga	Separation Creek	Separation Creek
Kennett River	Wye River	Bass Strait
Kennett River	Kennett River	Bass Strait

Wye River is a town in Victoria, Australia. It is also the name given to the waterway which flows through the town and into the sea. Situated 155 km to the west of Melbourne, on the Otway Coast, part of the scenic Great Ocean Road, the Wye River township is located about 15 km west of the resort town Lorne, Victoria. It became more feasible for Melburnians to holiday there after the section of the Great Ocean Road from Lorne to Apollo Bay was opened in 1932. At the 2016 census, Wye River had a permanent population of 66, although its holiday population is ten times that.

== History ==
Prior to European colonization, the area was inhabited for tens of thousands of years by the indigenous Gadubanud (Katabanut) people. The site was first occupied by European settlers in 1882. Brothers Alex and Donald Macrae, and their cousin Alex MacLennan, were looking for an area suited to farming and fishing, and settled near Separation Creek, establishing a farm which they named the Wye, after a river in Wales and Herefordshire. Alex MacLennan settled a little further west at a site he named the Kennet, later the settlement of Kennett River, after another British river.

Wye River Post Office opened on 19 January 1914, but some time before 1945 it was reduced to a telegraph office for a considerable period of time, mail being delivered from Lorne. A school was established in the local hall in 1920, but only lasted a year, after the closure of a sawmill resulted in a loss of population. The school was re-established in a converted residence in 1931, operated part-time with the Aireys Inlet school from 1935, and closed permanently in 1942.

On Christmas Day 2015, a bushfire destroyed at least 98 homes in the area. At nearby Separation Creek another 18 homes were destroyed. There were no deaths at either town.

As a consequence, the state government announced a $2,75m relief package and imposed strict new fire regulations to rebuild houses.

In January 2026 intense rainfall and flash flooding caused the caravan park to be inundated and many cars to be washed out to sea.

== Tourism ==
The area is known for scenic coastal views, beautiful beaches, Otway Forest walks, wildlife including koalas and birds as well as the Great Otway National Park. Active tourism opportunities include fishing and excellent surfing.

The official tourism organization representing Wye River is Otway Coast Tourism.

There are two caravan parks, the Seasonal Foreshore, located close to the main beach, and the BIG4 Wye River Holiday Pad.

There is one pub, the Wye Beach Hotel (formally known as "The Rookery Nook Hotel") and a general store Wye General which also contains the post office and a cafe.

In recent years, the numbers of southern right whales and humpback whales seen around the shores are increasing as the whale populations recover as well as other species such as bottlenose dolphins.

== Organizations ==
Wye River has a Country Fire Brigade and a Surf Life Saving Club. A cycling group called the Wye Riders ride bikes in the morning on the Great Ocean Road. They can often be seen afterwards at the general store having breakfast.

The Wye River Separation Creek Progress Association whose purpose is simply to "advance the welfare and protect the environment" of Wye River and Separation Creek. The association's volunteer committee of 12 meets every few months and hosts a public forum in January that is open to the entire community and the many related service organizations.

== Transport ==
Cars are the main form of transport to get to and from the town, via the Great Ocean Road. Within the town, most people walk between destinations. Wye River is serviced by the 101 V/Line coach that travels between Geelong Station and Apollo Bay in both directions.

== Media ==
A few seconds of the 2013 movie Blinder was filmed in Wye River. The scene features a car driving along the Great Ocean Road. The camera was positioned outside the local pub.

In season 1, episode 1 of Surviving Summer, a few seconds show a car driving over the bridge, with a sign which would usually say Wye River, it was replaced with "Shorehaven" In the shot you can see the store/cafe. Shortly after the camera view changes to a shot being taken from the beach, showing the same car driving across the bridge.

== Notable residents ==
- Zoe Daniel MP, former Member for Goldstein, Parliament of the Commonwealth of Australia
- The Hon Steve Bracks AC, politician (former Premier of Victoria)
- The Hon Norman Lacy, politician (former Minister for the Arts and Educational Services, Victoria)
- Mike Brady, musician
