= Skenes Creek =

- Suburb
- Coordinates: 38°43′00″S 143°42′30″E
- Country: Australia
- State: Victoria
- LGA: Shire of Colac Otway

Government
  - State electorate: Polwarth
  - Federal division: Wannon

Population
  - Total: 249 (2021 census)
- Postcode: 3233

Skenes Creek is a locality in Victoria, Australia, situated in the Shire of Colac Otway. In the 2021 census, Skenes Creek had a population of 249.

The area was named by surveyor George Smythe after his fellow surveyor, Alexander Skene, who became the Victorian Surveyor General in 1868.

Skene's Creek State School opened on 14 March 1887 and closed in December 1945, with the former school building then moved to the Apollo Bay Consolidated School.

Skene's Creek Post Office opened on 9 October 1890 and closed on 4 December 1891.

The Skenes Creek Bridge is currently undergoing works set to be completed in June 2026.
