= Western Victoria language =

Australian Aboriginal language

Western Victoria
- Eastern Central Murray
- Native to: Australia
- Region: Victoria
- Ethnicity: Wemba-Wemba, Nari-Nari, Barababaraba, Wergaia, Wotjobaluk, Marditjali, Jardwadjali
- Language family: Pama–Nyungan: Kulinic; Kulin; Western Victoria
- Dialects: Wemba Wemba; Barababaraba; Wergaia (incl. Wotjobaluk); Nari Nari; Ladji Ladji; Madhi Madhi; Wadi Wadi; ? Jardwadjali

Language codes
- ISO 639-3: Variously: rnr – Nari-Nari rbp – Barababaraba weg – Wergaia xwt – Wotjobaluk xww – Wemba-Wemba
- Glottolog: west2443

The Western Victoria language is an Australian Aboriginal language of the Kulin branch of the Pama–Nyungan family.

== Dialects ==
Jardwadjali (with dialects Jagwadjali, Nundadjali, Mardidjali) may be Western Victoria.
