= Latji Latji =

Indigenous Australian people of Victoria, Australia

The Latjilatji, sometimes spelt Latji Latji or Latje Latje are an Indigenous Australian people of the state of Victoria, Australia.

== Name ==
The ethnonym Latjilatji consists of a reduplication of the word for "no" (latja).

== Language ==
Latjilatji is a Western Central Murray language classified as a member of the Kulinic language branch of the Pama Nyungan language family. It is closely related to Matimati and Wadiwadi. A vocabulary of the tongue, compiled by E. M. Curr from informants interviewed at Kulkyne, was published in 1887. It is critically endangered, with 10 speakers being recorded in 2004.

== Country ==
The Latjilatji lands extended over some 3,500 square miles (9,100 km^{2}), ranging from Chalka Creek to Mildura on southern bank of Murray River, and stretching some 50 miles to its south. It encompassed Kulkyne, and ran south as far the vicinity of Murrayville and Pine Plains.

== Social organization ==
The Latjilatji are divided into two moieties, the Kailpara and Makwara, the former connected to the emu, the latter to the eagle-hawk. A child's descent was traced through the mother.

== History ==
The Ladji Ladji lived on the Murray River in the Mildura area. White settlement of that area occurred in 1845–7. The early explorer Edward Eyre mentioned them in his work (1845) under the name Boraipar and transcribed a number of words from their language. The smallpox that devastated the Latjilatji, as it did all the Murray riverine tribes (Tatitati, Jitajita, Nari-Nari, Barababaraba, Warkawarka, Watiwati, Wemba-Wemba) after initial contact with whites was established, was described by Peter Beveridge, writing of his impressions in the 1850s.

All the old men in these tribes shows distinct smallpox traces, In speaking of this scourge they say that it came with the waters, that is to say, it followed down the rivers in the flood season, laying its death clutch on every tribe in its prime until the whole country became perfectly decimated. During the early stages of its ravages the natives gave proper sepulture to its victims; but at last the death rate became so heavy, and naturally, the panic so great, burying the bodies was no longer attempted- the survivors merely moved their camps leaving the sick behind to die, unattended, and the dead to fester in the sun, or as food for wild dogs and carrion birds, until in a short time the whole atmosphere became tainted with the odour arising from the decomposing bodies...When the bright torrid summer displaced the moister spring, after devastating these tribes, gradually died out, leaving but a sorry remnant of the aborigines behind, to mourn the depopulation of the land, and many, many moons waxed and waned before the fell destroyer's foul presence was even partially forgotten. To this day the old men who bear such patent traces of the loathed distemper speak shudderingly and with so much genuine horror as it is impossible for any other evil to elicit from them their inherent stolidity'.

The death of John Mack in 1918 was reported as that of the "last blackfellow" of the "Murray River tribes" and specifically of the original people of Mildura, which was on Latjilatji lands. His precise tribal affiliation has not been established however. Mack's aboriginal name was, according to Ronald and Catherine Berndt, who interviewed his first wife, the Jarildekald woman Pinkie Karpeny in 1891, was Djelwara/Telwara, (born 1842 and he was said to have hailed, east of Mildura, from Laitjum, near Culcairn station in Kalkine territory, in New South Wales. From the Berndts's classificatory Kukabrak perspective that would be Munpul clan territory and Mack would have been a Walkandiwoni. James Matthew, who knew him and corresponded with his son, Albert, variously has him as born in Jarijari lands, or in the Wimmera (Note: "It would appear from Albert's letter that Mack was originally a member of the Mallee Gandeet-or blacks that dwelt on the Wimmera rivers and lakes, as contrasted with the Mille Gundeet, or tribes lining the banks of the Murray, who were fierce and domineering." (Matthew 1917, p. 13)) and taken as a child to the Mildura Murray area as a child, where he underwent initiation.

== Alternative names ==
- Baluk-mernen ("people of the sandhills") an exonym for them used by the Wotjobaluk
- Banju-bunan
- Boraipar
- Laitche
- Laitchi-Laitehi
- Latjoo-Latjoo
- Latyu-latyu, Latyoo-Latyoo, Litchoo-Litchoo, Laitci-laitci, Laci-Laci, Laitu-Laitu, Laitu
- Leitchi-Leitchi
- Litchy-Litchy
- Lutchye-Lutchye
- Sitchy Sitchy (a misreading )
- Walkandwani (the term used by tribes to their west to designate them)
- Wortongi (variant: Woortongi, meaning "man")

Source: Tindale 1974

== Some words ==
- manul (type of bony fish, also name of a totem)

== Sources ==
- "Australian Indigenous Languages Database - Ladji Ladji". AustLang.
- Berndt, Ronald Murray; Berndt, Catherine Helen; Stanton, John E. (1993). A World that was: The Yaraldi of the Murray River and the Lakes, South Australia. University of British Columbia UBC Press. p. 220. ISBN 978-0-774-80478-3 – via Internet Archive.
- Beveridge, Peter (1883). "Of the aborigines inhabiting the great lacustrine and Riverine depression of the Lower Murray". Journal and Proceedings of the Royal Society of New South Wales. 17. Melbourne: 19–74 – via BHL.
- Brown, A. R. (July–December 1918). "Notes on the social organization of Australian tribes". The Journal of the Royal Anthropological Institute of Great Britain and Ireland. 48: 222–253. doi:10.2307/2843422. JSTOR 2843422.
- Matthew, James (1 September 1917). Aboriginal Dialects. Mildura Cultivator – via Trove.
- Matthew, James (20 January 1918a). John Mack, Aborigine. Mildura Cultivator – via Trove.
- Matthew, James (19 June 1918b). John Mack- Our Very Last Blackfellow. Mildura Cultivator – via Trove.
- Tindale, Norman Barnett (1974). "Latjilatji (VIC)". Aboriginal Tribes of Australia: Their Terrain, Environmental Controls, Distribution, Limits, and Proper Names. Australian National University Press. ISBN 978-0-708-10741-6.
