= Dadi Dadi =

Australian Aboriginal people from the Murray River area of Victoria

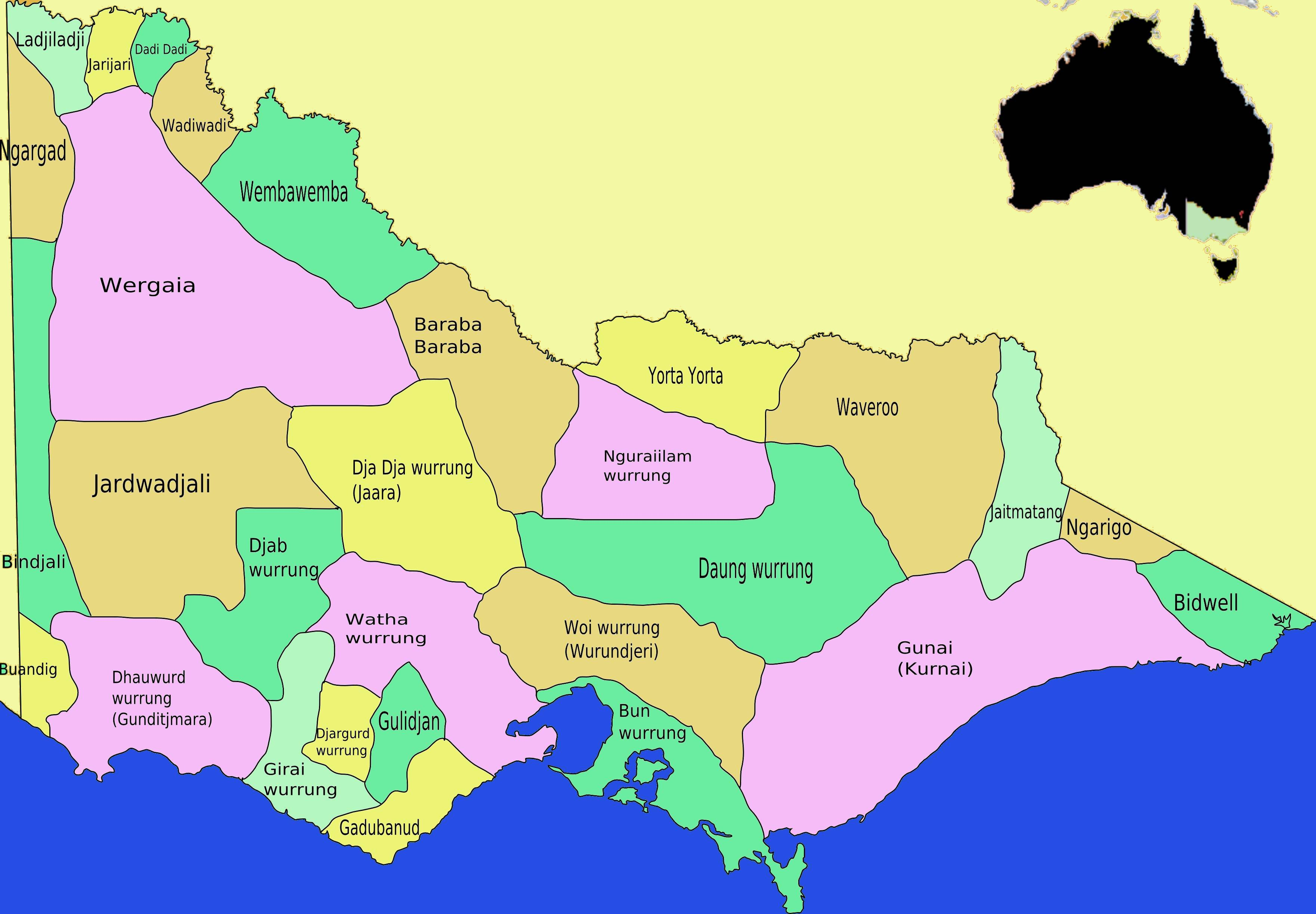
Victoria Aboriginal tribes

The Dadi Dadi or Tatitati are an Australian Aboriginal people whose traditional lands are located along the southern banks of the Murray River in Victoria, Australia.

== Language ==
The Dadi Dadi language is a nearly extinct member of the Lower Murray languages, which form a branch of the Pama-Nyungan language family. During the 1960s and 1970s samples of the language were recorded by Luise Hercus. The language is related to Yita Yita. Most of the tribal names of this group (Nari-Nari, Barababaraba, Latjilatji, Warkawarka, Watiwati, Wemba-Wemba) are formed by a reduplication of the word for "no" in their respective languages, the word "tati" bearing that sense.

== Country ==
The Dadi Dadi lands, according to Norman Tindale, extended over 2,300 square kilometres (900 mi^{2}), covering the area from Euston to 24 kilometres (15 mi) above the Murrumbidgee junction. Though mainly concentrated on the southern bank of the Murray River, they also ranged as far north as Benanee. As part of the Murray–Darling basin, the area's history of human habitation goes back some 27,000-36,000 years.

== Social organization ==
The Dadi Dadi, much like the Latjilatji, were divided into two moieties, the Kailpara and Makwara, with descent from the mother's side.

== History of contact ==
Smallpox and other introduced diseases had already ravaged the Murray Valley Aboriginal population before the actual establishment of colonial "runs" or pastoral properties in the region. Charles Sturt in 1830 described a particularly dire state of ill-health, ascribing it to leprosy. During colonial times bodies were removed from five Aboriginal burial sites by George Murray Black, along the New South Wales side of the Murray River and are now part of the Murray Black Collection. The repatriation of these bodies is now being sought by tribal groups.

== Alternative names ==
- Darty-Darty
- Nimp-mam-wern (lit. 'light lip')
- Tataty, Tatatha, Tat(h)i, Ta-ta-thi, Tar-tarthee, Ta-tathi, Taa-tatty
- Tunggut

Source: Tindale 1974

== Some words ==
- bet (father)
- malol (wife)
- met (father's father)
- mim (father's mother)
- paka (mother's mother)
- tamburay (frilled lizard)
- ŋak (mother)
- ŋatai (mother's father)

Source: Brown 1918, p. 250

== Sources ==
- "AIATSIS map of Indigenous Australia". AIATSIS.
- Balme, J.; Hope, J. (1990). "Radiocarbon Dates from Midden Sites in the Lower Darling River Area of Western New South Wales". Archaeology in Oceania. 25 (3): 85–101. doi:10.1002/j.1834-4453.1990.tb00239.x. JSTOR 40386883.
- Beveridge, Peter (1883). "Of the aborigines inhabiting the great lacustrine and Riverine depression of the Lower Murray". Journal and Proceedings of the Royal Society of New South Wales. 17. Melbourne: 19–74.
- Brown, A. R. (July–December 1918). "Notes on the social organization of Australian tribes". The Journal of the Royal Anthropological Institute of Great Britain and Ireland. 48: 222–253. doi:10.2307/2843422. JSTOR 2843422.
- Cameron, A. L. P. (1885). "Notes on Some Tribes of New South Wales". The Journal of the Anthropological Institute of Great Britain and Ireland. 14. Royal Anthropological Institute of Great Britain and Ireland: 344–370. doi:10.2307/2841627. JSTOR 2841627.
- "Endangered local languages come to life through linguist's work with community" (PDF). Resource Network for Linguistic Diversity. 5 May 2015.
- Hercus, Luise (1989). "Three Linguistic Studies from Far South-Western NSW" (PDF). Aboriginal History. 13 (1): 45–62.
- Prince, Jordi Rivera (2015). Can the Repatriation of the Murray Black Collection be Considered an Apology? Colonial Institutional Culpability in the Indigenous Australian Fight for Decolonization. In Situ. pp. 9–13. Archived from the original on 26 November 2016.
- Radcliffe-Brown, A. R. (July 1930). "The Social Organization of Australian Tribes. Part II". Oceania. 1 (2): 206–246. doi:10.1002/j.1834-4461.1930.tb01645.x. JSTOR 40327321.
- Ryan, Edward (2014). "Water for country, words for water: Indigenous placenames of north-west Victoria and south-west New South Wales" (PDF). In Clark, Ian D.; Hercus, Luise; Kostanski, Laura (eds.). Indigenous and Minority Placenames: Australian and International Perspectives. Australian National University Press. pp. 293–304. ISBN 978-1-925-02162-2.
- Sturt, Charles (2011). Two Expeditions Into the Interior of Southern Australia, During the Years 1828, 1829, 1830, and 1831: With Observations on the Soil, Climate, and General Resources of the Colony of New South Wales. Vol. 2. Cambridge University Press. ISBN 978-1-108-03886-7.
- Tindale, Norman Barnett (1974). "Tatitati (VIC)". Aboriginal Tribes of Australia: Their Terrain, Environmental Controls, Distribution, Limits, and Proper Names. Australian National University Press. ISBN 978-0-708-10741-6. Archived from the original on 8 April 2017.
- Webb, Stephen (2009). Palaeopathology of Aboriginal Australians: Health and Disease Across a Hunter-Gatherer Continent. Cambridge University Press. ISBN 978-0-521-11049-5.
