= Jarijari =

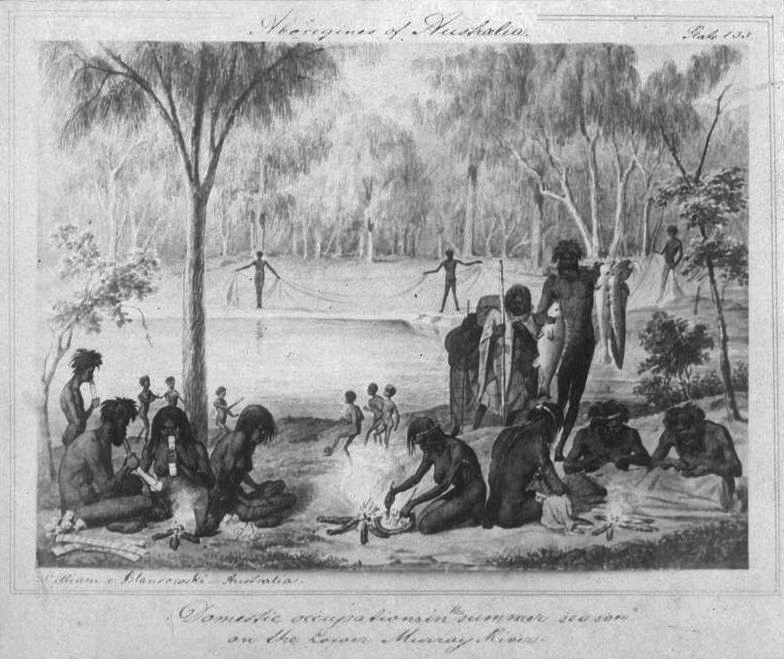
Gustav Mützel's 1862 depiction of domestic scene at Mondellimin (Merbein) from the Blandowski expedition in 1857

The Jarijari (also known as Nyeri Nyeri) are an Aboriginal Australian people whose traditional territory is in the Mallee region of Victoria.

== Name ==
Jari/nyeri was the tribe's word for "no", it being customary for the Murray tribes of this area to be identified by the negative used in their respective languages.

== Language ==
The Jarijari language has been classified as belonging to the Lower Murray Areal Group, together with Kureinji, and to be similar to that spoken by the Watiwati, but reports are contradictory and may not be speaking of the same people.

Some words:

- Yaturr (Murray cod)
- Barnta (trout cod)

== Country ==
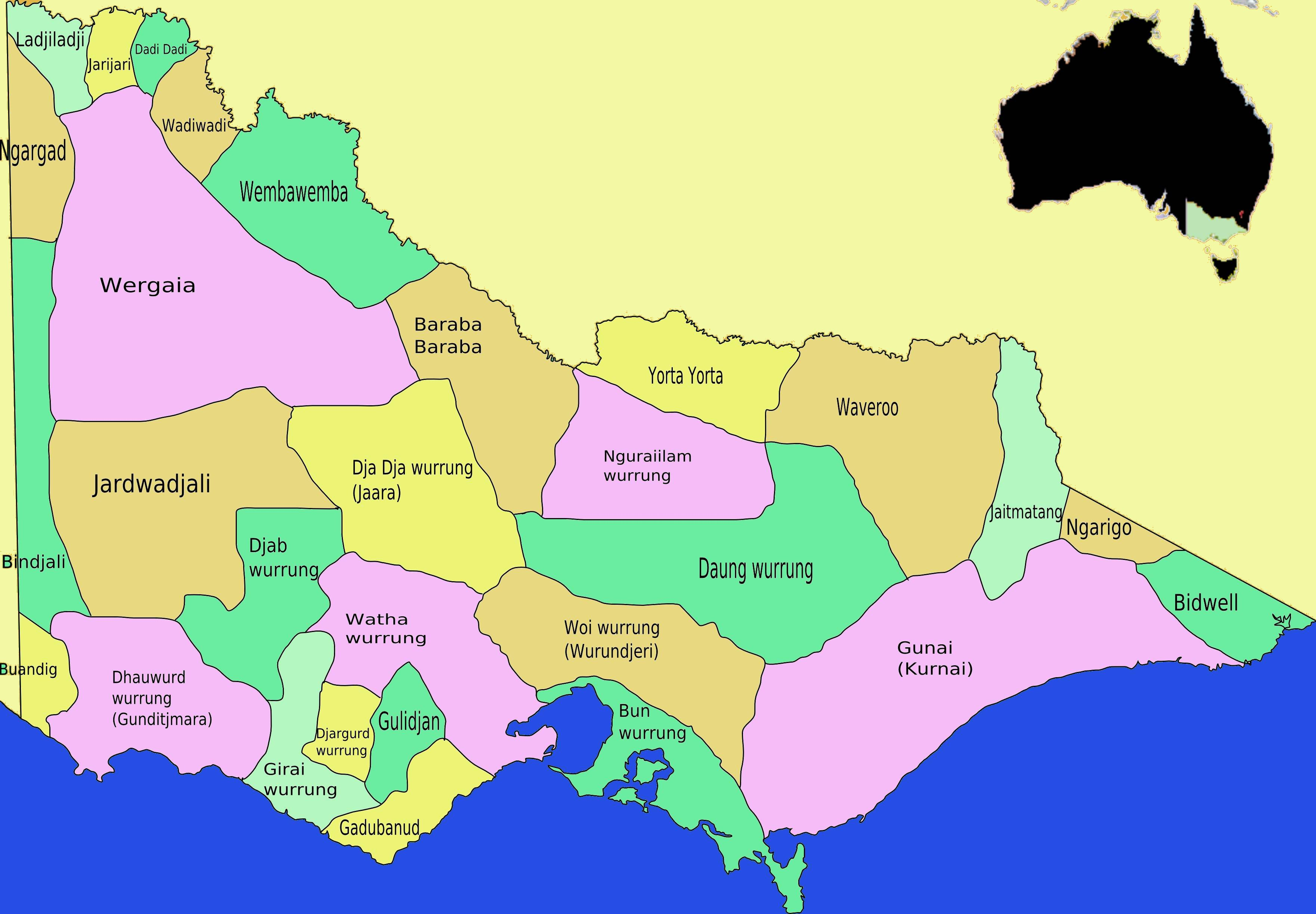
Map including Jarijari territory (in yellow) at the north west

According to Norman Tindale, the Jarijari tribal lands covered around 1,900 square miles (4,900 km^{2}) on the western bank of the Murray River, from above Chalka Creek to Annuello in the Mallee. Their southern frontier ran sound along Hopetoun Lake Korong and Pine Plains. The northern frontier bordered on Red Cliffs.

Neighbouring tribes were the Wergaia to the south, the Latjilatji to the west and the Dadi Dadi to the east.

== Meeting with Blandowski Expedition in Merbein ==
The Blandowski Expedition (1856–1857) was one of the first documented European encounters with the people. Blandowski described the Yarree as his "good friends". Notably one of William Blandowski's 1857 illustrations depicted traditional Jari Jari recreation. Peter Beveridge, in his 1883 account "The Aborigines of Victoria and Riverina" recorded some of the tribe's dreamtime beliefs, associated with these Murray tribes of which the Jarijari were one.

Blandowski ended his account with a general statement on the recent state of these Murray riverine tribes:

On the whole I have but to make the most deplorable statements concerning our natives. Extermination proceeds so rapidly, that the regions of the Lower Murray are already depopulated, and a quietude reigns there which saddens the traveller who visited those districts a few years ago.

== Traditional riverine diet ==
The classification of species by Blandowski was flawed, in that he made several species out of distinct life phases in just a few. (Note: Humphries writes:He was certainly overly enthusiastic in his naming of the four life history stages of silver perch as different species (although he placed them all in the genus Cernua, and mentioned that they were difficult to distinguish from each other). But because the aborigines had different names for them, because they occupy different habitats during each stage, and even professional fish systematists have commonly made the same mistake with other species, this offence is certainly pardonable.' (Humphries 2003, p. 164)) At least three were reclassified and renamed under a different taxonomy: flathead gudgeon, the Jarijari collundera: Australian smelt (Retropinna semoni) and Murray hardyhead (Craterocephalus fluviatilis).

- Tandan or dew-/jewfish, in Jarijari called kenaru, was considered a great delicacy, and its consumption by young men was forbidden.
- Bony bream (Nematalosa erebi). Blandowski who was the first to identify it scientifically, called this Megalope Caillentassart, - manur in Jarijari. This was a tribal staple throughout June–July, except for women, for whom it was taboo, since it was thought to have aphrodisiacal properties, given its nourishing adiposity. It was also a grave marker, positioned in a way that pointed in the direction of the presumed murderer.
- Silver perch known as baggack. Blandowski used Thomas Mitchell 's nomenclature and referred to it as Cernua Bidyana.
- Cernua Eadesii, native aname buruitjall (Note: However Humphries glosses this too as a 'silver perch'. It was named after Richard Eades (1809–1867), a physician at Melbourne Hospital and one of the cofounders of the Philosophical Institute.' (Humphries 2003, p. 161))
- Cernua Nicholsonia, or in Jarijari karpa
- Cernua Ifflaensis, or bipe purritjall
- Cernua Wilkiensis, or in Jarijari mallupit. A billabong species.
- Kohna Mackennce, or kohn
- Turruitja Achenson, or turrultje. Both a Murray and billabong species.
- Jerrina Dobreensis, or jorrin. Mainly fished from billabongs.
- Poko. Only the Jarijari term was given for this species of nigh transparent, greenish spotted trout, which however was not specific to the Murray, but also found in the Yarra River.
- Uteranka Irvingi or uterank. Also a Yarra fish, not unknown to the Murray, though rare there. Preyed on largely by other fish.
- Oristes Macquariensis, or yaturr. This was a major staple of the Jarijari, even in winter where it would be hunted at night by firelight when the flooding led the cod to 'sleep' in the nooks of logs along the bank. In summer, the Jarijari would dive to the bottom of the Murray to spear it.
- Gristes Peelil, or barnta
- Collundera Miitteriana, in Jarijari collundera. A billabong fish.
- Loetj, a billabong fish, no longer than 2 inches.
- Rurrina Macadamia, or koerin/kurrin, a bluish-green billabong fish that mostly preyed on crayfish.
- Brosmius Bleasdalii, or paltk, a billabong fish, but found also in the Yarra.
- Cernua Nicholsonia, or karpa

== Alternative names ==
- Jere jere
- Nyerri-nyerri
- Yairy-yairy
- Yari-yari
- Yariki-luk (exonym applied to the Jarijari by the Wotjobaluk)
- Yarree Yarree, Yarre-yarre, Yerri-yerri, Yerre-yerre, Yerry-yerry

Source: Tindale 1974, p. 205

== Sources ==
- "AIATSIS map of Indigenous Australia". AIATSIS.
- Allen, Harry (2006). "Authorship and ownership in Blandowski's Australien in 142 Photographischen Abbildungen" (PDF). Australasian Historical Archaeology. 24: 31–37.
- Beveridge, Peter (1865) [First published 1861]. "A few notes on the dialects, habits, customs and mythology of the Lower Murray aborigines". Transactions of the Royal Society of Victoria. 6. Melbourne: 14–24.
- Beveridge, Peter (1883). "Of the aborigines inhabiting the great lacustrine and Riverine depression of the Lower Murray". Journal and Proceedings of the Royal Society of New South Wales. 17. Melbourne: 19–74.
- Blandowski, W. von (1858). "Recent discoveries in natural history on the Lower Murray". Transactions of the Philosophical Society of Victoria. 2. Melbourne: 124–137.
- Blandowski, W. von (1862). Australien in 142 photographischen Abbildungen nach zehnjährigen Erfahrungen (PDF). Gleiwicz: Gustav Neumann.
- Clark, Ian D. (1996). A Report to the Victorian Aboriginal Corporation For Languages. Victorian Aboriginal Corporation.
- Dixon, R. M. W. (2002). Australian Languages: Their Nature and Development. Cambridge University Press. ISBN 978-0-521-47378-1.
- Howitt, Alfred William (1904). The native tribes of south-east Australia (PDF). Macmillan.
- Humphries, Paul (December 2003). "Blandowski misses out: ichthyological etiquette in 19th-century Australia". Endeavour. 27 (4): 160–165. doi:10.1016/j.endeavour.2003.08.006. PMID 14652039.
- Smyth, Robert Brough (1878). The Aborigines of Victoria: with notes relating to the habits of the natives of other parts of Australia and Tasmania (PDF). Vol. 1. Melbourne: J. Ferres, gov't printer.
- Tindale, Norman Barnett (1974). "Jarijari (VIC)". Aboriginal Tribes of Australia: Their Terrain, Environmental Controls, Distribution, Limits, and Proper Names. Australian National University Press. ISBN 978-0-708-10741-6. Archived from the original on 2 July 2017.
- Trueman, Will T. (2011). True Tales of the Trout Cod: River Histories of the Murray-Darling Basin (PDF). Murray-Darling Basin Authority. ISBN 978-1-921914-66-9. Archived from the original (PDF) on 17 February 2017.
