= Bindjali language =

Extinct Australian Indigenous language

Bindjali
- Bodaruwitj
- Potaruwutj
- Native to: Australia
- Region: South Australia
- Ethnicity: Bodaruwitj
- Era: last attested 1973
- Language family: Pama–Nyungan: Kulinic; Kulin; Bindjali

Language codes
- ISO 639-3: None (mis)
- Glottolog: None
- AIATSIS: S15

The Bindjali language, also called Bodaruwitj, (Note: R. H. Mathews identified a Tyattyalla language, now written Djadjala, spoken between the Werringen and Albacutya lakes and provided some grammatical and vocabulary notes. Norman Tindale regarded Tyattyalla as a heteronym both for the Wotjobaluk and the Bodaruwitj. The Wotjobaluk ranged over into Tatiara country, which is usually taken to be Bodaruwitj country. (Tindale 1974, p. 208)) is an extinct language spoken in the state of South Australia by the Bodaruwitj. The name Yaran specifically refers to the variety spoken around the Padthaway district. William Haynes, an earlier resident of the area, provided E.M.Curr with two distinct vocabularies of the area, which he designated as that of the Tatiara. Norman Tindale compiled a word-list relying on information supplied to him by Milerum, whose mother Lakwunami was a Potaruwutj from the Keilira region. R.M: Dixon managed to elicit a vocabulary of Bindjali from a Bordertown informant, Bertie Pinkie, as late as 1973. In his classification, Polinjunga, one of the alternative names for the Bodaruwitj, or a clan name of the same, is listed as a dialect of the Bungandidj-Kuurn Kopan Noot subgroup of the Kulinic languages.
