= Mathi Mathi =

Mathi Mathi may be:

- The Muthi Muthi people
- The Madhi Madhi language
