= Nari-Nari language =

Extinct Australian Aboriginal language

Nari Nari
- Nari-Nari language (New South Wales)
- Region: New South Wales
- Ethnicity: Nari-Nari people
- Extinct: early 20th century, with the death of Angus Myers
- Language family: Pama–Nyungan: Kulinic; Kulin; Wemba-Wemba?; Nari Nari

Language codes
- ISO 639-3: rnr
- Glottolog: nari1241
- AIATSIS: D9
- ELP: Nari Nari

Nari Nari is an extinct Indigenous Australian language that was spoken in New South Wales. The last person who could speak Nari Nari was Angus Myers, a Jitajita man. It was last recorded in 1967, but date of extinction is unknown.

It may have been a dialect of Wemba Wemba.

== Etymology ==
The language's name follows the reduplicating pattern of many Aboriginal language names: nari translates to "no".

== Revival ==
As of 2020, the Nari Nari dialect is one of 20 languages prioritised as part of the Priority Languages Support Project being undertaken by First Languages Australia and funded by the Department of Communications and the Arts. The project aims to "identify and document critically-endangered languages—those languages for which little or no documentation exists, where no recordings have previously been made, but where there are living speakers".
