= Watiwati =

Indigenous Australian Aboriginal people

The Watiwati are an Aboriginal Australian people traditionally living on both sides of the Murray River, from Victoria to New South Wales.

== Language ==
They spoke Wadi Wadi, and their ethnonym, also transcribed Watiwati, is formed by a reduplication of the word for "no" (wati). It is classified as belonging to the Kulin branch of the Pama-Nyungan language family. Some words are conserved in an oral account of a Watiwati man's epic voyage, before the arrival of white settlement.

== Country ==
The Watiwati's lands enclosed some 2,000 square miles (5,200 km^{2}) of territory north and south of the Murray River and Swan Hill. It reached northwards towards Moolpa, N.S.W. To the west its boundary lay at Piangil in Victoria. To the east were the related Wemba-Wemba, north east the Nari-Nari, north northwest the Muthi Muthi, and to their west the Dadi Dadi.

== Social structure ==
The Watiwati were formed of several clans, one horde called the Dacournditch was located in the area between Tyntynder and Swan Hill.

== Mythology ==
According to A. L. P. Cameron, the Watiwati believed that the first inhabitants of the earth, all endowed with a capacity for metamorphosis into other animal species, were called Bukumurri, who were changed into ordinary men by Thathapuli, the dreamtime creator spirit. Fire had been the exclusive possession of Pandowinda, the cod fish. After a while, Pandowinda passed the secret of fire-making to the rakali water rat, Kerambin, on condition that the latter would cook for him. Other Bukumurri were deeply disgruntled at the arrangement, and convened a meeting, presided over by the native bat, Rakur to work out how to steal the secret. The task was delegated to the hawk Keridka, who twice dispatched strong winds to make spread the fire being used by Pandowinda and his offkick, Kerambin. On each occasion, his attempt failed. A third attempt, with a powerful whirlwind succeeding, despite prodigious efforts to snuff them out, succeeded, and a wildfire burnt out over the forests to create the plains of the Riverina. While the others rejoiced that the fire was now accessible, only Rakur went about, clearing the fire from some trees, and spiriting ashes in the clefts to keep the flame, as the others mocked his efforts. When a rainstorm doused the conflagration he made them realize the folly of their ridicule, and he taught them to rub sticks together and coax the flames out of the concealed embers.

The Watiwatis believed that after you die, your body wanders about in a dazed state, confused by its new surroundings. Bumbling along a path, it comes to a fork, one track coveted with hindrances, being overgrown with brambles, the other offering an easier prospect. The good man's soul would choose the harder track, knowing the unencumbered route would be rife with perils. Some way on, it comes upon two women, one haggishly ugly, the other young and enticing. The old woman warns him not to be cajoled by the charms of the young woman. Further on, it encounters a chasm, brimming with flames, and the soul springs over it as the flames recede. It comes upon a rope drawn across the path by two women who endeavour to trip him up. Once this obstacle is negotiated, it arrives among the blessed, but even there the trial is not ended, as it was endure a period of probation with a special diet, and subjected to testing challenges. Lastly, it is placed at a spot where fleet emus race past, and given a spear, and told to spear one if he is to finally meet the maker. In Wati lore, shooting stars are the traces of spears thrown by souls as they try to hit the emus and, if successful, encounter their high being, Thathapuli.

== Alternative names ==
- Biangil (the name for Piangil)
- Dacournditch
- Wathiwathi, Wattewatte, Wotti-wotti
- Withaija
- Woani (= "man")
- Wohdi Wohdi
- Woonyi

Source: Tindale 1974, p. 208

== Sources ==
- "AIATSIS map of Indigenous Australia". AIATSIS.
- Beveridge, Peter (1865) [First published 1861]. "A few notes on the dialects, habits, customs and mythology of the Lower Murray aborigines". Transactions of the Royal Society of Victoria. 6. Melbourne: 19–74 – via BHL.
- Cameron, A. L. P. (22 April 1903). "Traditions and folklore of the aborigines of New South Wales". Science of Man. 6 (3). National Library of Australia: 46–48.
- Hercus, Luise (1989). "Three Linguistic Studies from Far South-Western NSW" (PDF). Aboriginal History. 13 (1): 45–62.
- Morey, Stephen (23 March 2019). "The journey of a Wati Wati man". La Trobe University.
- Tindale, Norman Barnett (1974). "Watiwati (VIC)". Aboriginal Tribes of Australia: Their Terrain, Environmental Controls, Distribution, Limits, and Proper Names. Australian National University Press. ISBN 978-0-708-10741-6.
