= Muthi Muthi =

Indigenous Australian people

Muthi muthi people
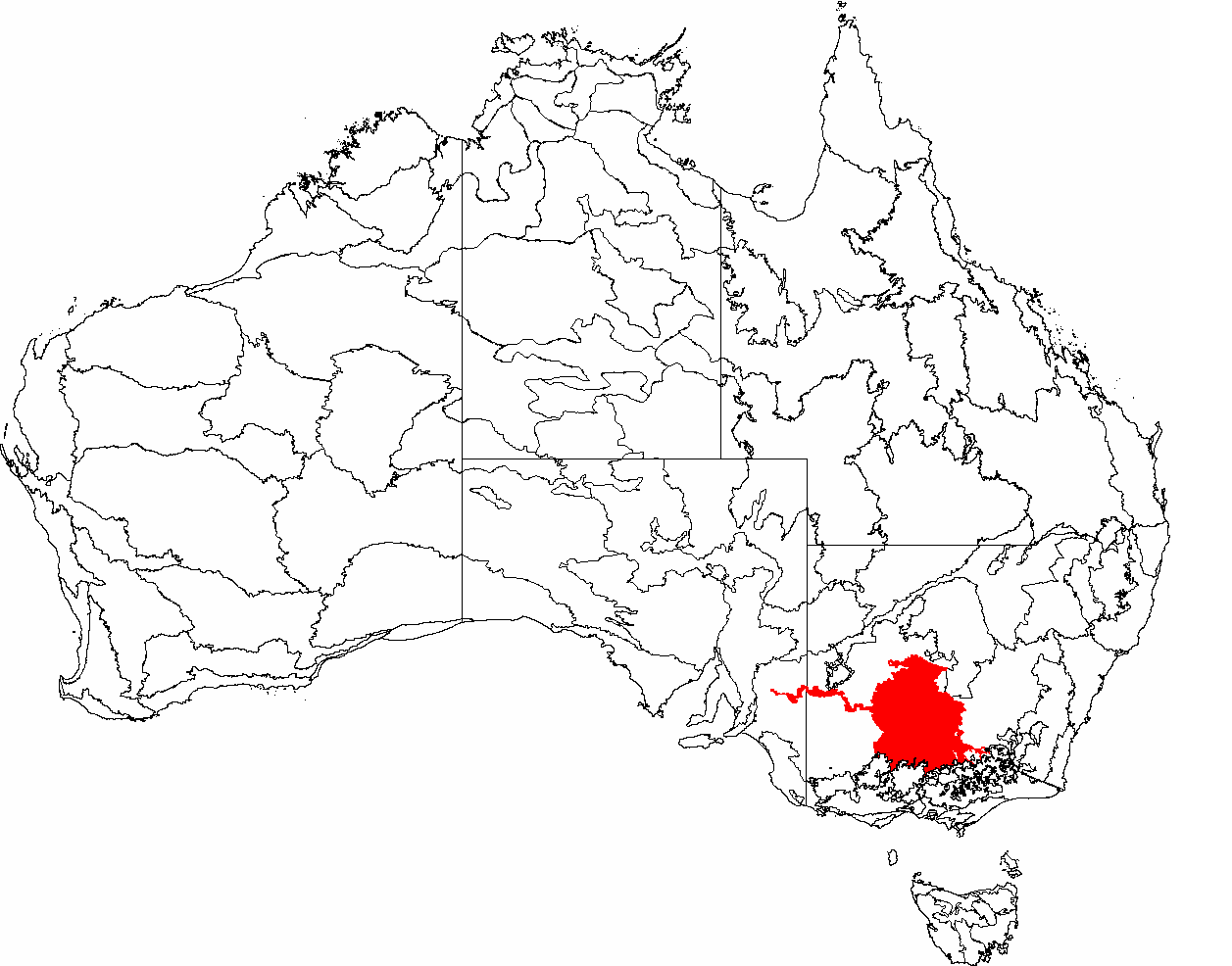
- Riverina bioregion

Hierarchy
- Language family: Pama–Nyungan
- Language branch: Kulin
- Language group: Western

Area
- Location: Northern Riverina and Far West regions of New South Wales
- Coordinates: 33°30′S 145°30′E
- Rivers: Edward River; Lachlan River; Murray River; Murrumbidgee River; Wakool River
- Lakes: Lake Victoria; Reedy Lake; Willandra Lakes
- Urban areas: Balranald; Pooncarie; Menindee

Notable individuals
- Kutcha Edwards; Mungo Man; Mungo Lady; Ballandella and Tourandury; Whitepeeper

The Muthi Muthi people are an indigenous Australian people whose traditional lands are located in the Northern Riverina and Far West regions of New South Wales.

The Muthi Muthi are the traditional owners of Nimmie Caira and the Lowbidgee and share custodial rights for Lake Mungo, Mungo Man and Mungo Lady with the neighbouring Paakantji and Ngiyampaa groups.

== Language ==
The Mati Mati spoke Madhi Madhi, a Kulinic language, and, according to Barry Blake, one of a subgroup, the Mathi languages, of which Matdhi Madhi is the best known. The subgroup includes the related Watiwati Letjiletji languages. What is distinctive about it compared to the languages spoken by most contiguous peoples is that it lacks monosyllabic nouns.

== Country ==
The Muthi Muthi lands stretched over an estimated 2,200 sq. m. (5,700 square kilometres (2,200 mi^{2}).), taking in the Murrumbidgee River in the area of Balranald, with their southwestern boundary on the Murray River. Their western extension ran cloise by to Lake Benanee. Their northern reaches lay to the west of Carrawatha]. Modern towns encompassed by their territory are Booligal, Oxley, Maude, Homebush, Clare, Kyalite, Tooleybuc, Koraleigh and Euston.

Running clockwise, their neighbours were the Parrintyi to the north, the YitaYita northeast, the Nari-Nari to the east, the Wati Wati on their southern flank, the Dadi Dadi on their southwestern frontier, and the Kureinji to their west.

Archaeological investigation has confirmed a tribal boundary in this location as this is the last known location of Muthi Muthi burial mounds.

== Alternative names ==
- Bakiin
- Madi-madi
- Mataua
- Matimati
- Matthee-matthee
- Moorta Moorta
- Muti muti
- Mutte Mutte
- Mutti Mutti

Source: Mathews 1898, p. 68; Tindale 1974, p. 197

== Native title ==
In 1997 a claim for native title was made for an area in the south of New South Wales.

== Notable people ==
- Kutcha Edwards, a musician
- Mungo Man and Mungo Lady
- Ballandella and Tourandury
- Whitepeeper

== Some words ==
- lénghi (camp)
- wanápi (fire)
- wuthúngi (man)

Source: Hercus 1989, p. 46

== Sources ==
- "Applications - New South Wales" (PDF). Native Title Newsletter. No. 6/97. April 1998.
- Blake, Barry J. (2011). The Mathi Group of Languages. Pacific Linguistics. ISBN 978-0-858-83635-8.
- Hercus, Luise (1989). "Three Linguistic Studies from Far South-Western NSW" (PDF). Aboriginal History. 13 (1): 45–62.
- Mathews, R. H. (1898). "Initiation ceremonies of Australian tribes: Appendix, Nguttan initiation ceremony". Proceedings of the American Philosophical Society. 37: 54–73.
- "The Three Tribal Groups". Mungo National Park.
- Tindale, Norman Barnett (1974). "Muthimuthi". Aboriginal Tribes of Australia: Their Terrain, Environmental Controls, Distribution, Limits, and Proper Names. Australian National University Press. ISBN 978-0-708-10741-6.
