= Djadjawurrung language =

Kulin language spoken in Australia

Djadjawurrung
- Region: Victoria
- Ethnicity: Dja Dja Wurrung people
- Extinct: (date missing)
- Language family: Pama–Nyungan: Kulinic; Kulin; Wemba-Wemba; Djadjawurrung

Language codes
- ISO 639-3: dja
- Glottolog: None
- AIATSIS: S31.1
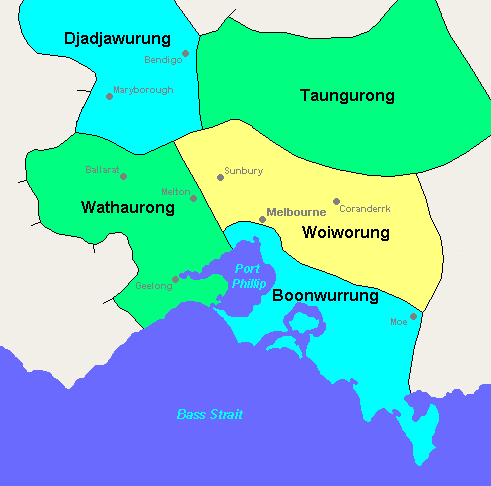
- The five Kulin nations. Djadjawurrung is in the northwest in blue.

- Location of Djadjawurrung Country in Victoria

Djadjawurrung (also Jaara, Ngurai-illam-wurrung) is an Aboriginal Australian language spoken by the Dja Dja Wurrung people of the Kulin nation of central Victoria. Djadjawurrung was spoken by 16 clans around Murchison, the central highlands region, east to Tylden, west to the Pyrenees, north to Boort and south to the Great Dividing Range. It is now extinct.

== Phonology ==
=== Consonants ===
	Labial	Alveolar	Retroflex	Palatal	Velar
Stop	⟨p⟩ p	⟨t⟩ t	⟨rt⟩ ʈ	⟨tj⟩, ⟨yt⟩ c (Note: The spellings ⟨ny⟩ and ⟨ly⟩ are spelled as ⟨yn⟩ and ⟨yl⟩ in syllable-final position, ⟨tj⟩ can also be spelled ⟨yt⟩ if it is an unreleased stop (it is simply spelt as ⟨tj⟩ released).)	⟨k⟩ k
Nasal	⟨m⟩ m	⟨n⟩ n	⟨rn⟩ ɳ	⟨ny⟩, ⟨yn⟩ ɲ	⟨ng⟩ ŋ
Lateral		⟨l⟩ l	⟨rl⟩ ɭ	⟨ly⟩, ⟨yl⟩ ʎ	
Rhotic		⟨rr⟩ r	⟨r⟩ ɽ (Note: The retroflex rhotic may be an approximant [ɻ], or a flap [ɽ].)		
Approximant	⟨w⟩ w			⟨y⟩ j	

=== Vowels ===
There are four vowels noted: /i e a u/. They may also be phonetically written as [i ɛ~e a ʊ~u].
