= Maude, New South Wales =

Maude
- Town
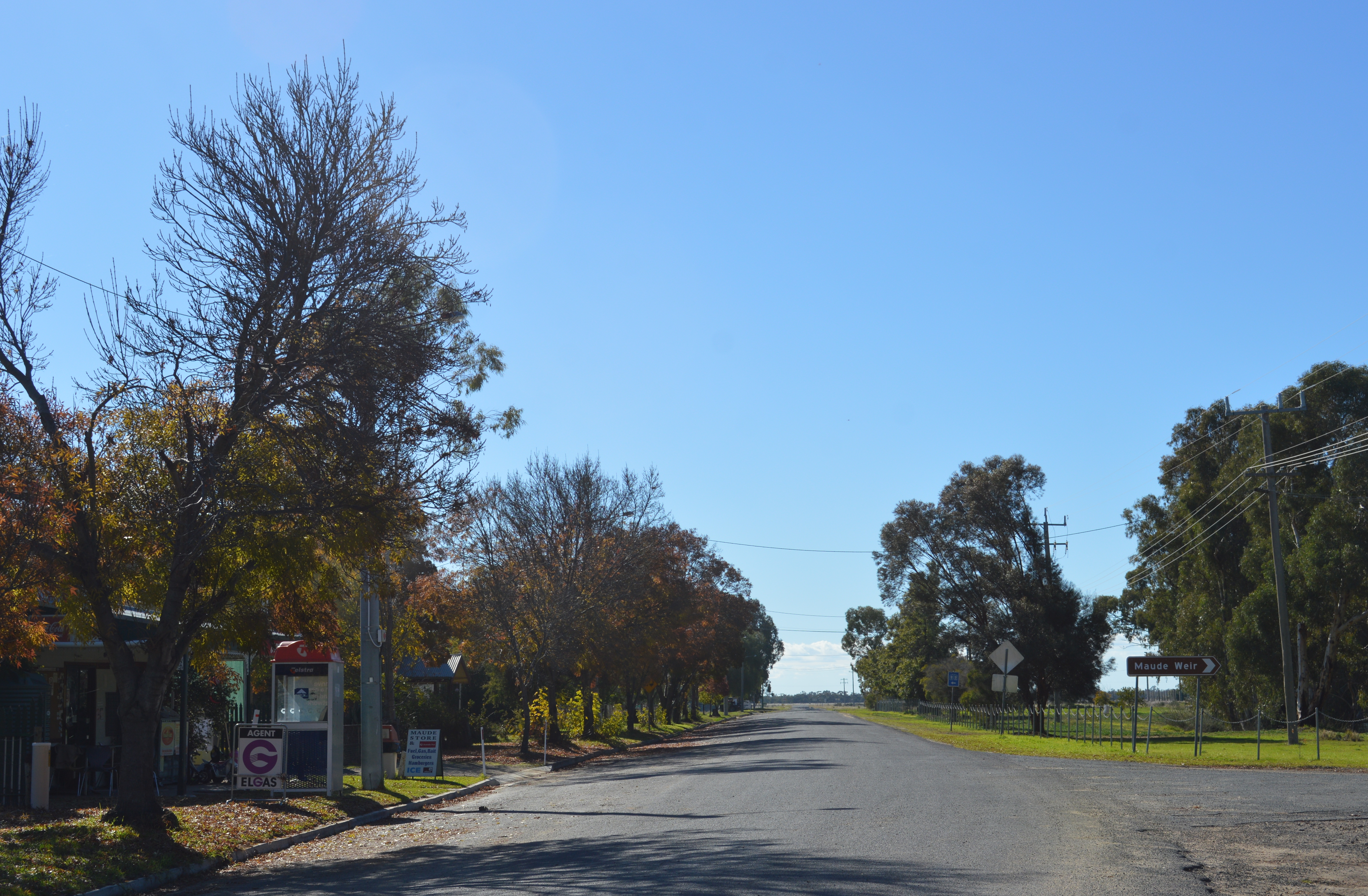
- Yang Yang St, the main street of Maude

- Coordinates: 34°27′0″S 144°18′0″E
- Country: Australia
- State: New South Wales
- LGA: Hay Shire
- Location: 55 km (34 mi) from Hay
- Established: 1861

Government
  - State electorate: Murray
  - Federal division: Farrer

Population
  - Total: 161 (2006 census)
- Postcode: 2711
- County: Waradgery

Maude is a village on the north bank of the Murrumbidgee River in New South Wales, Australia. It is in between Hay and Balranald in Hay Shire. It is 55 kilometres downstream from Hay and 25 kilometres upstream from the junction of the Lachlan River with the Murrumbidgee. At the 2006 census, it had a population of 161. It consists of a general store, hotel, post office and caravan park. It is surrounded by market gardens supplied with water from Maude Weir, a popular spot for anglers looking for yellow belly, redfin and Murray cod.

== History ==
Maude marks the traditional boundary between the Muthi Muthi and Nari Nari Aboriginal tribes.

=== "Pin Pan Pa" reserve ===
The surveyor F. P. McCabe, under instructions from the Colonial Secretary, surveyed a number of reserves on the lower Murrumbidgee River in about 1849. The reserves were finally gazetted in October 1852. They included the "Pin Pan Pa" reserve of 7.5 square miles (19 km^{2}), described as being "situated on cattle runs, occupied by Phelps and Darchey", just over a mile downstream from "the hut at Pin-pan-pa". The reserve was taken from Phelps and Chadwick's "Pimpampa" and Thomas D'Archy's "Budgee Budgee" runs. During the 1850s the Pimpampa Reserve was used as a crossing place for stock and drays. Being close to the Lachlan–Murrumbidgee junction the crossing-place was probably used by those who were unwilling to leave the river frontages during hot and dry conditions. Feldtmann (1976) states that a hotel was built at the locality by the late 1850s; if true, it was certainly not licensed and was probably just a bush shanty serving a passing trade and workers on local pastoral runs.

=== A township established ===
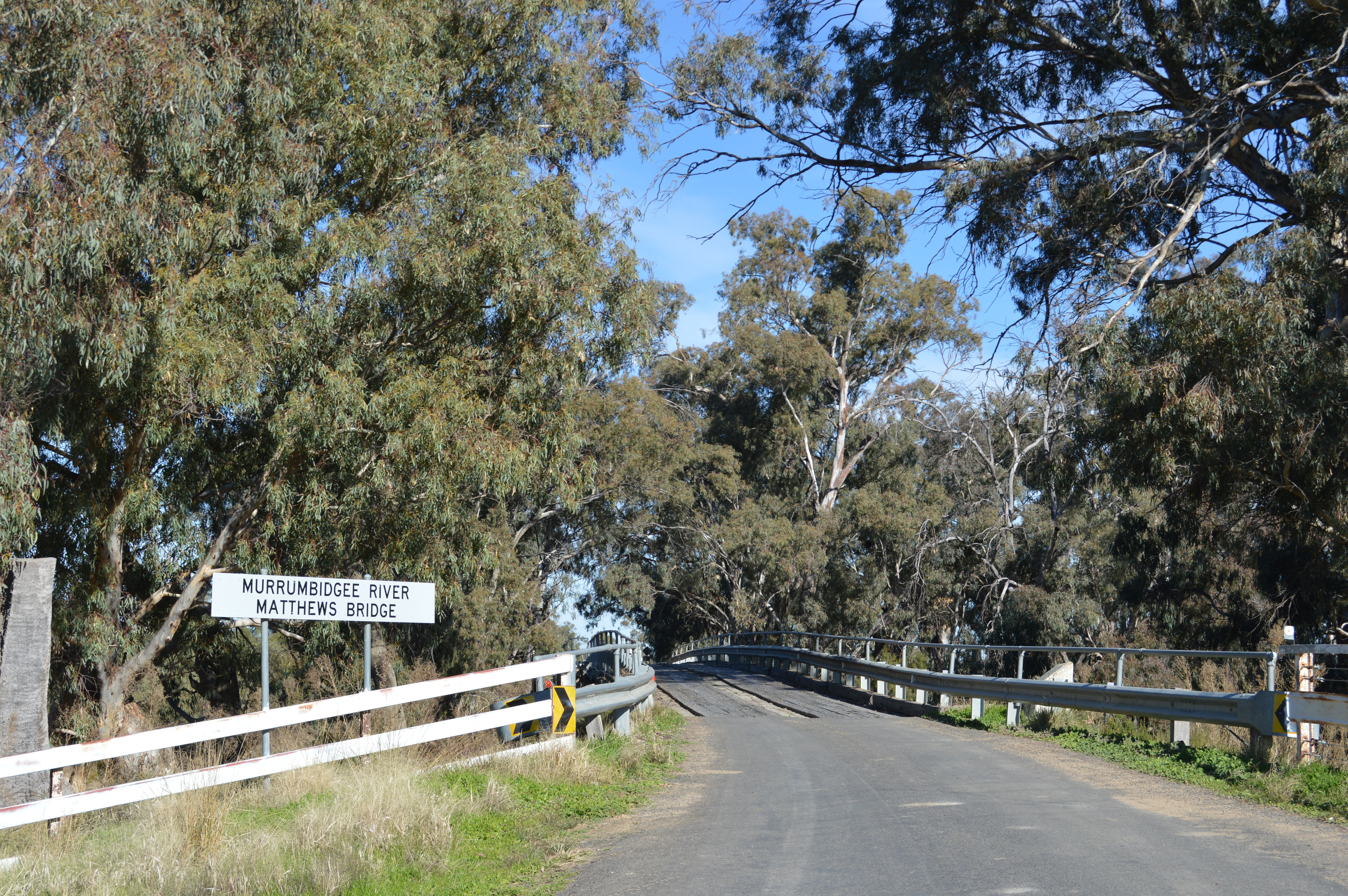
Matthews Bridge over the Murrumbidgee

In the early 1860s the surveyors Adams and Twynam laid out a township on the Pimpampa Reserve. The name "Pimpaympa" was submitted, but it was not approved by the Executive Council; instead they chose the name of "Maude".

In April 1861 it was reported that "the Government have recently laid out a new township named Maude, at Pimpampa, on the Lower Murrumbidgee". However the writer expressed doubts about the viability of the new settlement: "It is ... very improbable that many buildings will ever be erected on the spot, as during a flood, or even when the river is very high, the spot can hardly be approached on account of the deep creeks which encircle it on both sides of the river". During the past year the locality had been isolated by high waters for about six months, "and no one approached it unless obliged to do so by urgent necessity".

In late October 1861 the steamer Albury towed "a large punt" to the new township. The punt was being re-located from Deniliquin and belonged to Frank Johns and his partner William Platt. Johns and his family had moved to Maude and began to operate the punt at the locality soon after its arrival.

Frank Johns was a carpenter by trade and began to erect a hotel at Maude in conjunction with his working punt. The hotel was completed in November 1862. Johns applied to the Bench of Magistrates at Hay for a publican's licence, but the application was opposed by the local squatter and magistrate, Thomas D’Archy, because "there were no police at Maude". After the delay of a month, however, the licence for the Maude Punt Hotel was granted on the promise of police protection being provided within three months (although by the end of 1863 there was still no permanent police presence at Maude).

In late 1862 it was reported that a store was to be erected at Maude and that "a numerously signed petition" had been forwarded to the Minister of Lands "requesting that some land may be at once put up for sale at Maude, as some parties are desirous of settling there". The writer was somewhat puzzled by this: in addition to the locality being "sometimes encircled with flooded ground" he claimed that the "amount of traffic passing is very small indeed, and there is no immediate prospect of any increase". The correspondent concluded: "There however seems to be no reason why the Government should not offer some land for sale at Maude, and so afford persons an opportunity of settling down there and making their fortunes if they can".

A post-office was established at Maude on 1 May 1863. The first post-master was probably Henry Prendergast, who, in conjunction with his son John had established a store at the township. In October 1863 Maude was designated as a place for the holding of Courts of Petty Sessions. By the end of the year the New South Wales Government had still not organised a land-sale at the township, despite frequent requests to this end by residents. The correspondent to the Sydney Morning Herald commented that "the whole place exists on sufferance, the owners of the buildings being in unauthorised occupation of Crown land".

In February 1864 Frank Johns transferred his licence for the Maude Punt Hotel to Patrick Prendergast (another of son of Henry). The Prendergasts built several stores at Maude, including a wool store. Wool from surrounding pastoral runs was loaded onto steamers at Maude for transportation (by that stage most often to Echuca). By 1865 John Prendergast was the post-master at Maude. Henry Prendergast died in January 1867 and the business was carried on by his son John.

Land at Maude was eventually offered for sale on 27 December 1865 (over four years after the township was first laid out and "after many of the original applicants [to buy land] had left the district").

=== 1866-1900 ===
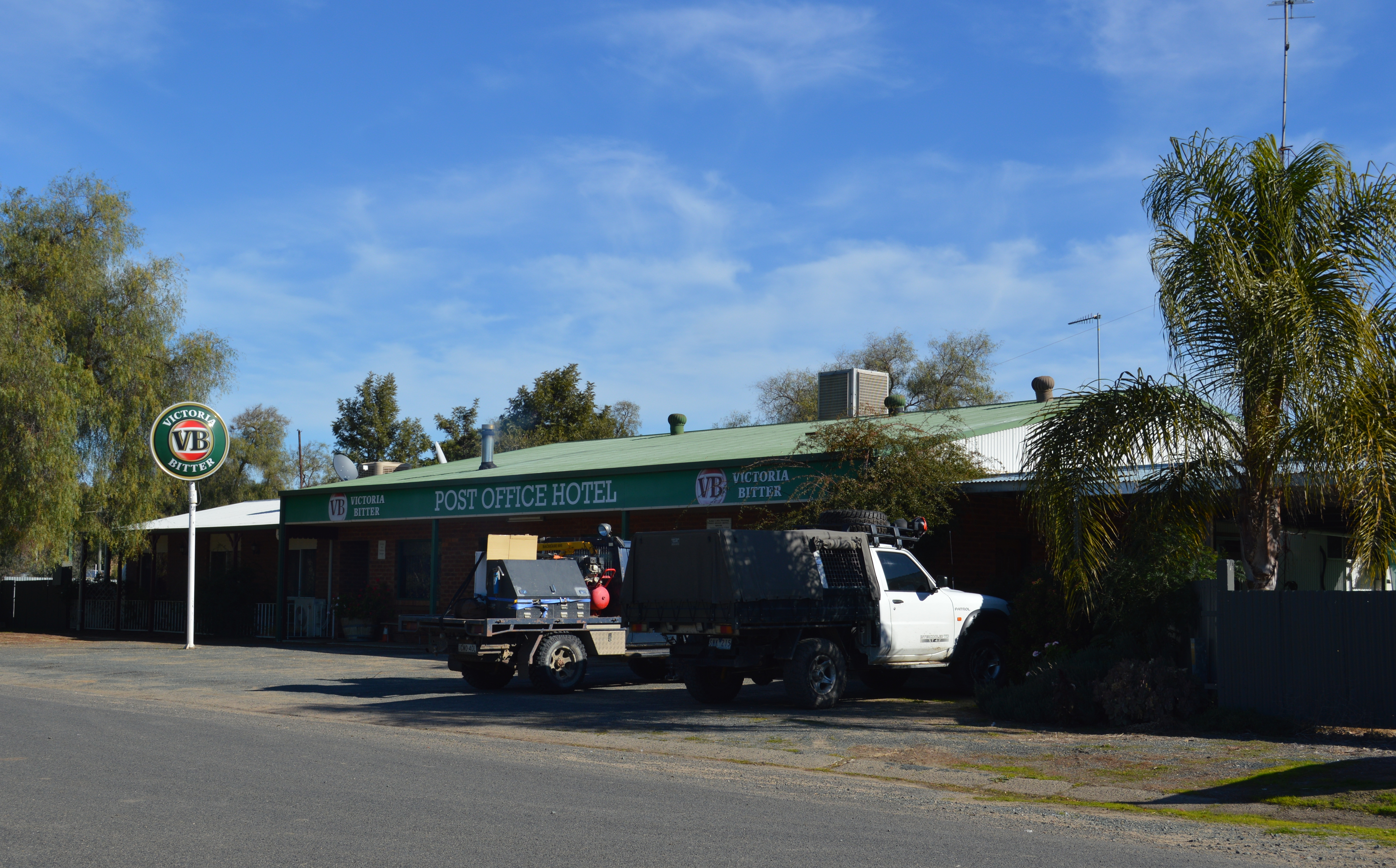
Post Office Hotel

From 1 July 1868 Daniel Murphy replaced Patrick Prendergast as the licensee of the Maude Punt Hotel. During the same year a second hotel opened at Maude – the Post Office Hotel – with Patrick Prendergast as the first publican. The Maude Punt Hotel had ceased trading by about the early 1870s, leaving the Post Office Hotel as the only hotel at Maude.

A visitor to Maude in early 1879 described "the little township of Maude" as situated "on the river bank", consisting of "four habitations, among which are a hotel and store, both kept by Mr. [Daniel] Murphy, and a police station, where a solitary trooper dreams his life away, praying, doubtless, for the Kellys to come and end his dreary lot". He added that "there is a punt crossing the river here, and a good-sized wool store, both in the hands of the almost solitary resident of the city, D. Murphy". The writer pointed out "that considerable traffic occurs through this place across the river, but great inconvenience is experienced after any heavy rains, owing to the billabong by which the township is surrounded becoming too deep to cross".

A visitor to the township in about May 1881 remarked that Maude was "chiefly remarkable for its pigs", adding that "one sees them scattered up and down the prospect as far as the eye can reach, and in any variety". The writer made these additional observations: "Maude (from what fair creature the place has taken its name, I can’t say) boasts a store, a pub., post office, a police barracks, a punt over the river, and a talking cockatoo".

=== Maude Weir ===
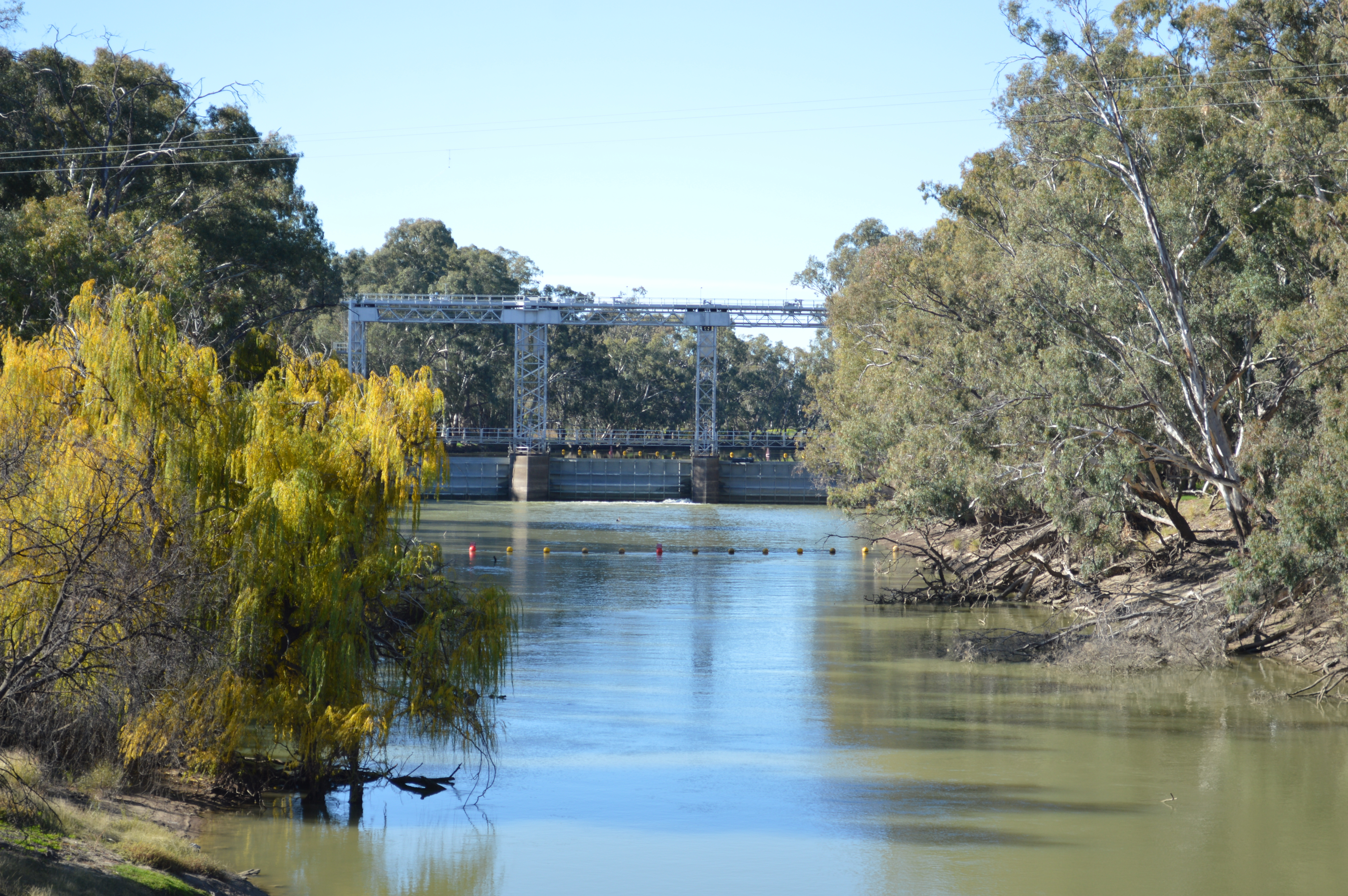
Maude Weir

During 1939–40 a weir was erected on the river at Maude by the Murrumbidgee Irrigation Authority. Its purpose was to divert water onto the lower bidgee flood plain, and to compensate landholders for the lack of natural floods after Burrinjuck Dam was built.

=== Later developments ===
In 1976 the village of Maude consisted of "about five houses". Public facilities in the town were the Post Office Hotel (usually known as 'the Maude Pub’), a school, recreation oval, service station, tennis courts and a bridge over the Murrumbidgee.

In 2020 work began on the replacement of the Matthews Bridge with a new concrete bridge.

=== Hells Gate ===
Hells Gate is a beef cattle feedlot of 13,000 hectares (50 mi^{2}) on the north side of the Sturt Highway in the Maude region. The property, of which 1,000 hectares (2,500 acres) is under irrigation, has been in the Paterson family since the 1960s.
