= Drual languages =

Group of Kulinic languages

Drual
- Geographic distribution: Victoria
- Linguistic classification: Pama–Nyungan: Kulinic; Drual
- Subdivisions: Bungandidj; Dhauwurd Wurrung

Language codes
- Glottolog: warr1256

Drual is a small group of indigenous Australian languages of the Kulinic family. The two languages are:

- Drual
  - Bungandidj (Buwandik)
  - Kuurn Kopan Noot

Warrnambool shares some features with Bungandidj, and is grouped within the Gunditjmara language.
