= Colac language =

Extinct Australian Aboriginal language

Gulidjan
- Kolakngat
- Region: Victoria
- Ethnicity: Gulidjan, ?Gadubanud
- Extinct: after 1839
- Language family: Pama–Nyungan: Kulinic; Gulidjan

Language codes
- ISO 639-3: None (mis)
- Glottolog: cola1237
- AIATSIS: S30
- ELP: Kolakngat
- Location of Gulidjan Country in Victoria

Colac (Kolacgnat, Kolakngat), also known as Gulidjan (Coligan, Kolijon, Kolitjon), is an extinct Aboriginal Australian language of the Gulidjan people of the state of Victoria, Australia. There is very limited data available on the language, but linguists have suggested that it is a mixed language, containing elements of neighbouring languages. No speakers have been recorded since 1975, so it is considered an extinct language.

== Name ==
Earliest sources refer to the language as Gulidjan, although James Dawson favoured Kolakgnat, which means 'belonging to sand'. In the Pik Wurrung dialect of the Warrnambool language, 'sand' is kulak, and in Wadawurrung and certain dialects of the Western Victoria language, it is kurrak. The name "Gulidjan" was considered by Barry Blake, Ian Clark, and Julie Reid to refer to the people and not the language.

== History ==
By 1858, only 19 Gulidjan survived. As of 1912, that number had dwindled to six.

=== Documentation ===
The language is first attested in 1839. Though much of the detail and vocabulary has been lost, there is sufficient to confirm that it constituted a separate language. About 100 words have survived.

== Classification ==
Some analysis suggests it may be a mixed language or creole language having something in common with each of the neighbouring languages.

== Phonology ==
=== Consonants ===
Blake, Clark, and Reid assume the Colac consonant inventory is as follows:

	Labial	Dental	Alveolar	Retroflex	Palatal	Velar
Stop	p/b	d̪/t̪	t/d	ʈ/ɖ	c/ɟ	k/g
Nasal	m	n̪	n	ɳ	ɲ	ŋ
Lateral		(l̪)	l	(ɭ)	(ʎ)	
Rhotic			ɾ~r	ɽ		
Semivowel					j	w

=== Vowels ===
It is indeterminable if Colac has a three- or six-vowel system. Long vowels may or may not be phonemic.

== Morphology ==
=== Pronouns ===
Very little of the grammar of the Colac language has survived, but some pronouns are attested:

	NOM	GEN
I	ngathuit	ngathangit
we two	ngathula	ngathangula
first person	ngathangorrok	ngathangangorrok
first person [inclusive?]	ngathunginak	
