= Bodaruwitj =

Indigenous Australian group

The Bodaruwitj, also rendered Bedaruwidj or Potaruwutj, and referred to in some early sources as the Tatiara, are an Aboriginal Australian people from the southeast of the state of South Australia. David Horton believed they were the group his sources referred to as the Bindjali people. Austlang refers to Bindjali / Bodaruwitj as alternative names for the same language.

== Name ==
Potaruwutj is an autonym, meaning in their language, "wandering" (-wutj is a suffix meaning "man"), referring to their continuous shifting of their campsites throughout the mallee scrubland.

== Country ==
Relying on two informants, Clarence Long (Milerum) and Alf Watson, Tindale estimated that the Potaruwutj's lands covered 3,000 square miles (7,800 km^{2}), extending westwards from Naracoorte down to within the third inland dune range of the Coorong area, some 10 miles from the coastline. The northern reaches touched Tatiara. It included Bordertown, Wirrega, and Keith.

Ecologically, Potaruwutj territory was less fertile and suffered from lower rainfall than neighbouring areas. The Ngarkat foraged to their north, with the Potaruwutj also present south of the main belt of mallee where the Ngarkat predominated. Like the Tanganekald and Jarildekald, the Potaruwutj marked out their territory with stones or cairns. The Potaruwutj clans, following a usage shared by these two tribes, named the major features of their territory by a name that referred to a distinctive characteristic of the zone, suffixed with a word like -injeri (belonging to) or -orn (an abbreviation of the word for "man"] attached to denote the area possessed. The suffix -injeri had the meaning of "belonging to" while -orn is said to be a contraction of korn meaning man or person,

== Social organisation ==
According to William Haynes, writing about the Tatiara in 1887, their numbers were thought to have amounted to some 500 at the beginning of white settlement, but only scattered remnants of the several distinct groups had survived within a few decades, and knowledge of them is fragmentary. At least five clans are known to have constituted the Potaruwutj group:

- Coolucooluk (horde name)
- Wirigirek (to the north. Cf. the toponym Wirrega, a place name)
- Tatiara (toponym)
- Polinjunga
- Kangarabalak

They practised neither circumcision nor ritual avulsion of the front teeth.

== History of contact ==
According to material gathered by Ronald and Catherine Berndt, as large number of Tatiara were killed at Piwingang near Tailem Bend after the former in a raid on a Ngarrindjeri camp. The affected group had too few warriors to retaliate and went south to organise a retaliatory hunt among several different groups. The large band of warriors managed to track the Tatiara down at Piwingang and only few survived the onslaught. Notwithstanding traditions that the Tatiara and Yaraldi did not intermarry, records indicate that intermarriage did take place between them and the Yaraldi Piltindjeri clan.

A Scottish businessman and immigrant, Robert Lawson, established a pastoral station on Bodaruwitj territory near Padthaway, and in later reports called the Indigenous people of that district the Coolucooluck, but also Padthaway. He defined these Coolucooluck as denizens of the area between Salt Creek, Galt's Station and Padthaway.

== Culture ==
The Bodaruwitj (Tatiara) men had a repute among other tribes, including the Yaraldi, for being well-endowed and having strong sexual appetites, just as native outsiders attributed to their women large labia majora. Some of this is reflected in a number of recorded songs.

The pelekaw song form is one in southeastern South Australia that makes a defiant accusation in the expectation it will be challenged. One notable case concerned the rules of exogamous exchange regarding women. A dispute with the Coorong lagoon Tanganekeld, whom the Potaruwutj called Tenggi, arose when the Tatiara Wepulprap clan of the Potaruwutj suspected the women they gave to the former were maltreated and subject to the sorcery of lethal bone-pointing. The reality was one of resentment over a perceived break-down in one-on-one exchanges arising from women being sent to the wrong, rather than the right, clan they were contracted to marry into.

A Potaruwutj big man with a repute for powerful magic, Dongaganinj, (Note: "Dongaganinj was a man who practised magic. He had a wooden bull-roarer or mimikur that he kept suspended in a katal or ' talking tree,' that is, one in which the branches chafed together and supplied him with information of events in other places. When Dongaganinj spoke a man's name to the mimikur in the talking tree, that person would become ill and might die. " (Tindale 1974, p. 35))) composed a pelekaw refrain which articulated these feelings of grievance.

We call the Tenggi people women chasers
They are mating throughout the tribe
We call the Tenggi people women chasers
They are all chasing and mating.

The neighbouring Meintangk, who sided with the Tanganekeld, on hearing this rude insinuation, composed a slanderous weritjinj variant on the pelekaw song which both slandered the Potaruwutj and challenged them to battle at the traditional combat grounds at Nunukapul (Telauri Flat) near Marcollat station. (Note: This toponym anglifies the native term Matkalat. (Tindale 1974, p. 35)) This song, chanted while men danced imitating their enemies coupling with dogs, rang:

Big man Dongaganinj makes his own rules
About the woman Manggeartkur (Note: Manggeartkur belonged to the Potaruwutj Kangarabalak clan (Tindale 1974, p. 35))
Dongaganinj helps himself
Frightens Manggeartkur to come to him
M! m! wi! wo! (Note: "Their lewdly enunciated 'm! m!' were expressions of derision. When they shouted 'wi!' they shook their bodies fiercely and then shouted 'wo!' In effect this meant 'Send her back where she came from; let the dogs have her!'." (Tindale 1974, p. 35))

A resolutive battle was arranged, and seven warriors were left dead on the Nunukapul field.

The Tanganekeld then took up the challenges, and composed a song:

The Tatiara people we hear
Have erect penises and swollen testicles
Our women are tired of carrying them
Hei! ja!
Weritjamini has an erect penis and big testes
His women carry them for him
Bad woman Manggeartkur lies for any man
We men will not sleep with her
Weritjamini and all the stupid (deun) spirits (powoqko) are bad marriage makers

Weritjamini was another influential Potaruwutj headman, associated with Dongaganinj. In this region's lore, the spirit, powoqko, was, on death, believed to travel northwest and cross over the sea to dwell on the island of Karta, and the implications of the original language were so abusive that the two groups would not intermarry for another two generations.

== Alternative names ==
- Bindjali
- Bunyalli
- Cangarabaluk
- Coolucooluk
- Dadiera
- Djadjala
- Jaran (language name)
- Kangarabalak (of the Tanganekald, kangara meant "east"+balak, "people.")
- Padthaway tribe
- Polenjunga
- Polinjunga
- Potangola
- Potaruwutj/Potaruwutji
- Tatiara (toponym) (Note: Known by the Ngarrindjeri as the Merkani according to George Taplin. (Berndt, Berndt & Stanton 1993, p. 21))
- Tattayarra, Tatiarra
- Tyattyalla
- Tyatyalli
- Tyedduwurrung
- Tyeddyuwurru
- Wepulprap (an exonym meaning "southern people" in Tanganekald)
- Wereka
- Wereka-tyalli
- Werekarait
- Wergaia
- Wimmera
- Wirigirek (a northern horde; Wirrega, a place name)
- Wirrega
- Woychibirik
- Wra-gar-ite (see Marditjali)
- Yaran

== Some words ==
- kadleira eared Otaria seal
- kal/kaal tame dog.
- maranipo/wrakan Red wattlebird
- mingka wedge-tailed eagle. (Note: word for a bird whose cry portended death or evil, and one perhaps borrowed into modern Ngarrindjeri to refer to a muldarpi bird in their lore bearing the same symbolic function, though their death bird was the southern stone-curlew. (Bell 1998, pp. 312ff., 316)) (Note: "Belief in the mingka spirit being extended beyond the Lower Murray area. The Aboriginal name for the mingka (minkar) was said to be a Potaruwutj language term from the south-east of South Australia, and to be the equivalent of merambi from the Tangani language of the Coorong. The Potaruwutj believed that the mingka was a 'being, sinister, who may assume form of totem animal' and 'is an evil being, warns about death or trouble'. The spirit being was recorded as being able to assume the form of various ngaitji (totemic 'friends') such as an eagle, dog or hawk. In these forms, the mingka carried the spirits of sinister people, connected to their owners by nunggi or kortui described as 'like a spider web.' Men could kill these beings and the sorcerer owners of the attending spirits with a 'sacred club'. Ngarrindjeri said that the mingka was connected to the kowuk bird, which they described as a Tawny frogmouth (Podargus strigoides). Berndt suggested that the mingka in the Lower Lakes was an owl." (Clarke 2018b, p. 22))
- pirit Noisy miner.
- teriterit willy wagtail.
- tuwul white-backed magpie (Gymnorhina tibicen)
- weirintj (whale). This Bodaruwitj term lies behind the indigenous term for the area of Rivoli Bay, namely Weirintjam/Wilitjam.
- wereka (no) (Note: In William Haynes's vocabularies of the Tatiara, two words for "no" are given, one being wawrek, the other allanya. (Haynes 1887, pp. 457, 459))
- wilkra wild dog (Note: Tindale speculated on the prehistorical indications potentially resident in the etymological link between the word for "native dog", whose introduction into Australia can be periodized archaeologically, and the word for fur seal; "Is the word for seal derived from the word for wild dog and coined when the Potaruwutj arrived near the shore of South Australia in post-dog-arrival time, or was the word for dog coined by an old established people confronted with a strange new animal that reminded them of the fur seal?" (Tindale 1974, p. 119))
- wutj (man)

== Sources ==
- Bell, Diane (1998). Ngarrindjeri Wurruwarrin: A World that Is, Was, and Will be. Spinifex Press. p. 316. ISBN 978-1-875-55971-8.
- Berndt, Ronald Murray; Berndt, Catherine Helen; Stanton, John E. (1993). A World that was: The Yaraldi of the Murray River and the Lakes, South Australia. UBC Press. ISBN 978-0-774-80478-3.
- "Bindjali/Bodaruwitj". AIATSIS. 26 July 2019.
- Clarke, Philip A. (2015). "The Aboriginal ethnobotany of the South East of South Australia region. Part 1: seasonal life and material culture" (PDF). Transactions of the Royal Society of South Australia. 139 (2): 216–246. Bibcode:2015TRSAu.139..216C. doi:10.1080/03721426.2015.1073415. S2CID 83873364.
- Clarke, Philip A. (2018a). "Animal food". In Cahir, Fred; Clark, Ian; Clarke, Philip (eds.). Aboriginal Biocultural Knowledge in South-eastern Australia: Perspectives of Early Colonists. Csiro Publishing. pp. 73–93. ISBN 978-1-486-30612-1.
- Clarke, Philip A. (2018b). "Terrestrial spirit beings". In Cahir, Fred; Clark, Ian; Clarke, Philip (eds.). Aboriginal Biocultural Knowledge in South-eastern Australia: Perspectives of Early Colonists. Csiro Publishing. pp. 19–34. ISBN 978-1-486-30612-1.
- Condon, H. T. (1955). "Aboriginal bird names - South Australia, Pt.2" (PDF). Royal Society of New South Wales - Journal and Proceedings. 21 (8): 91–8.
- Dixon, Robert M. W. (2004) [First published 2002]. Australian Languages: Their Nature and Development. Vol. 1. Cambridge University Press. ISBN 978-0-521-47378-1.
- Gale, Mary-Ann; Sparrow, Syd (2010). "Bringing the language home: the Ngarrindjeri dictionary project". In Hobson, John Robert (ed.). Re-awakening Languages: Theory and Practice in the Revitalisation of Australia's Indigenous Languages. Sydney University Press. pp. 387–401. ISBN 978-1-920-89955-4.
- Goodall, W. (1887). "Hopkins River" (PDF). In Curr, Edward Micklethwaite (ed.). The Australian Race: Its Origins, Language, Customs, Places of Landing and The Routes by which it spread Itself over that continent. Vol. 3. Melbourne: J. Ferres. pp. 494–495.
- Goodall, W.; Curr, E.M. (1887). "Languages of Western Victoria" (PDF). In Curr, Edward Micklethwaite (ed.). The Australian Race: Its Origins, Language, Customs, Places of Landing and The Routes by which it spread Itself over that continent. Vol. 3. Melbourne: J. Ferres. pp. 469–495.
- Haynes, William (1887). "The Tatiara Country" (PDF). In Curr, Edward Micklethwaite (ed.). The Australian Race: Its Origins, Language, Customs, Places of Landing and The Routes by which it spread Itself over that continent. Vol. 3. Melbourne: J. Ferres. pp. 456–459.
- Howitt, Alfred William (1904). The native tribes of south-east Australia (PDF). Macmillan.
- Lawson, Robert (1879). "The Padthaway tribe" (PDF). In Taplin, George (ed.). Folklore, manners, customs and languages of the South Australian aborigines. Adelaide: E Spiller, Acting Government Printer. pp. 58–59.
- Mathews, Robert Hamilton (1902). "The Aboriginal languages of Victoria" (PDF). Royal Society of New South Wales - Journal and Proceedings. 36: 71–106. doi:10.5962/p.359381. S2CID 259291856.
- Mathews, Robert Hamilton (1903). "Native languages of Victoria". American Anthropologist. 5 (2): 380–382. JSTOR 659067.
- Monaghan, Paul (2009). "Aboriginal names of places in southern South Australiaʹ Placenames in the Norman B. Tindale collection of papers". In Koch, Harold; Hercus, Luise (eds.). Aboriginal Placenames: Naming and re-naming the Australian landscape. Vol. 19. Australian National University Press. pp. 225–250. ISBN 978-1-921-66609-4. JSTOR j.ctt24h9tz.16.
- "S15: Bindjali / Bodaruwitj". AIATSIS Collection: AUSTLANG. AIATSIS. 26 July 2019.
- Tindale, Norman Barnett (1974). "Potaruwutj (SA)". Aboriginal Tribes of Australia: Their Terrain, Environmental Controls, Distribution, Limits, and Proper Names. Australian National University Press. ISBN 978-0-708-10741-6.
