= Mardidjali =

Aboriginal Australian people

The Marditjali were an Indigenous Australian people, a small tribe distinct from the Jaadwa, whose lands extended from the state of Victoria to South Australia.

== Name ==
Marditjali may not be the term used by the tribe itself, but an exonym applied to them by tribes to their west. Since the ethnonym is composed of two words marti ("abrupt/difficult to understand") and tjale (speech) from Western languages indicating their language was hard to grasp.

== Language ==
The Marditjali name for their language is unknown, but it was called Wintjabarap, designating the Wintjintanga horde by tribes to their west.

== Country ==
Marditjali ranged over a traditional land encompassing around 2,000 square miles (5,200 km^{2}) from. Naracoorte in South Australia to the Victorian Wimmera area of Goroke and west of Mount Arapiles; They ranged as far south as Struan, Apsley, and Edenhope. Their northern boundaries were around Bangham, Kaniva, and Servicetown.

Marditjali tribal areas were characterized by swampy zones encircled by imposing country was characterized by large red gum forests The frontier with the Bungandidj (Buandik) around Edenhope was marked by a brusque change in tree type, as red gums yielded to scrub gums. Their western boundaries with the Meintangk on the Naracoorte Range are likewise ecologically defined by the rising terraces of wooded lime sand dunes.

== Social organisation ==
The Marditjali were divided into several camps

- Witjintanga

== Alternative names ==
- Worangarait ([wora] = plain country, [ngara] = to exist in-name applied by Bunganditj)
- Worangarit, Wragarait
- Wintjabarap (language name)
- Lake Wallace tribe
- Keribial-barap
- Witjintanga
- Wichintunga

== Some words ==
- bangg (man)

== Sources ==
- Tindale, Norman Barnett (1974). "Marditjali (VIC)". Aboriginal Tribes of Australia: Their Terrain, Environmental Controls, Distribution, Limits, and Proper Names. Australian National University Press. ISBN 978-0-708-10741-6.
