= Woiwurrung–Taungurung language =

Pama–Nyungan language spoken in Australia

Woiwurrung–Taungurung
- Melbourne, Woiwurrung
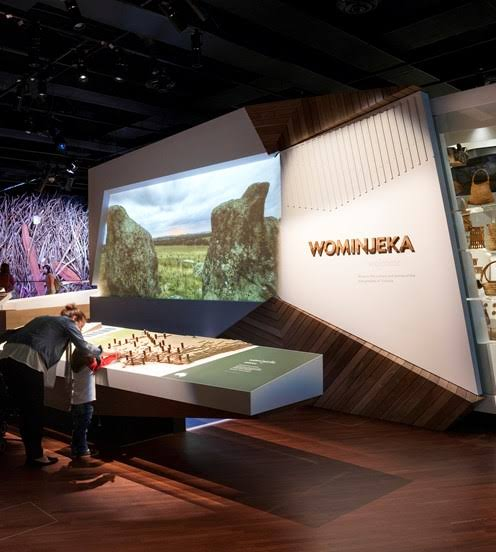
- Wominjeka 'welcome' at the entrance of Bunjilaka Aboriginal Cultural Centre, within Melbourne Museum
- Native to: Australia
- Region: Victoria
- Ethnicity: Woiwurrung, Wurundjeri, Taungurung, Boonwurrung, ?Ngurelban, etc.
- Extinct: by 2004
- Language family: Pama–Nyungan: Kulinic; Kulin; Woiwurrung–Taungurung
- Dialects: Woiwurrung; Taungurung; Boonwurrung; Ngurai-illamwurrung?

Language codes
- ISO 639-3: Either: wyi – Woiwurrung dgw – Daungwurrung
- Glottolog: woiw1237
- AIATSIS: S36, S37
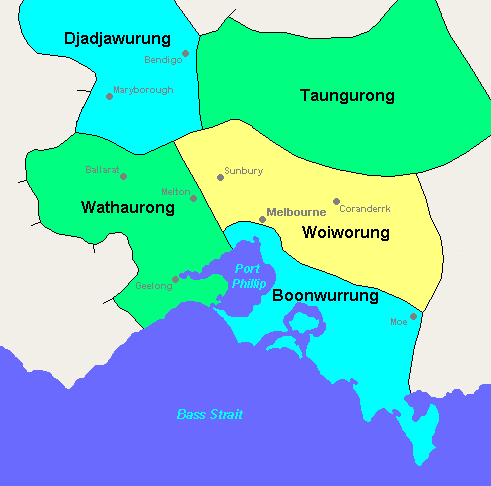
- The five Kulin nations. Woiwurrung proper is in yellow, Taungurung is in the northeast in green, Boonwurrung is in the southeast in cyan.

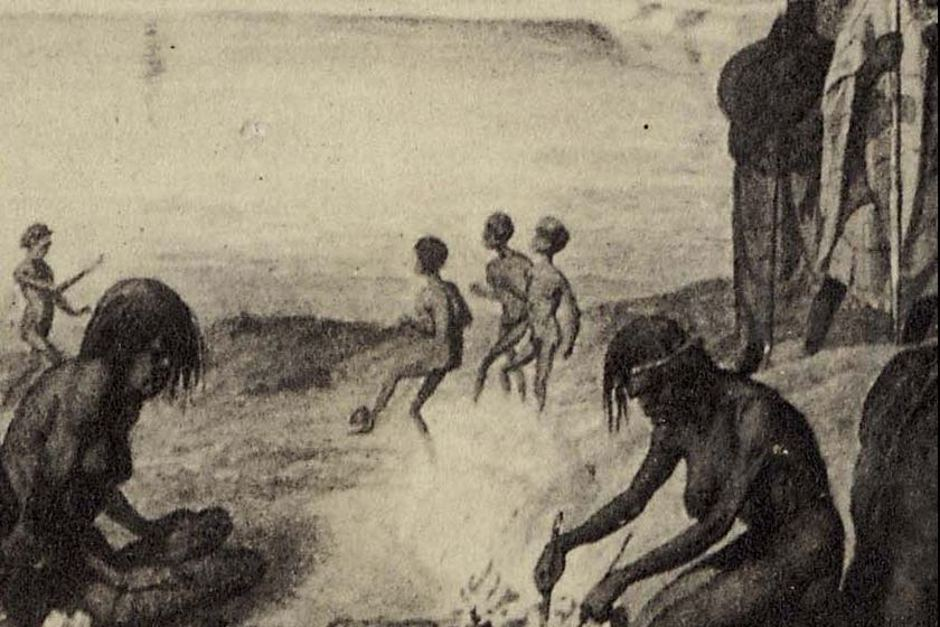
Marn grook football, played by speakers of Woiwurrung from the Wurundjeri clan, c. 1857

Woiwurrung, Taungurung and Boonwurrung are Aboriginal languages of the Kulin nation of Central Victoria. Woiwurrung was spoken by the Woiwurrung and related peoples in the Yarra River basin, Taungurung by the Taungurung people north of the Great Dividing Range in the Goulburn River Valley around Mansfield, Benalla and Heathcote, and Boonwurrung by the six clans which comprised the Boonwurrung people along the coast from the Werribee River, across the Mornington Peninsula, Western Port Bay to Wilsons Promontory. They are often portrayed as distinct languages, but they were mutually intelligible. Ngurai-illamwurrung (Ngurraiillam) may have been a clan name, a dialect, or a closely related language.

== Phonology ==
=== Consonants ===
The following is the Woiwurrung dialect:

	Peripheral		Laminal		Apical	
	Bilabial	Velar	Palatal	Dental	Alveolar	Retroflex
Plosive	b/p	ɡ/k	ɟ/c	d̪/t̪	d/t	ɖ/ʈ
Nasal	m	ŋ	ɲ	n̪	n	ɳ
Lateral					l	ɭ
Rhotic					r	ɽ
Glide	w		j			

It is not clear if the two rhotics are trill and flap, or tap and approximant.

=== Vowels ===
The exact qualities of vowels in Woiwurrung are unclear, due to conflicting transcription in early written accounts. Blake describes Woiwurrung as having at least three vowels, though mentions that there could be as many as six, much like Hercus' descriptions of Wemba Wemba. Hercus describes Woiwurrung as having five vowels, though noting that the vowel /o/ was potentially quite limited in use. Both describe an amount of allophonic variation within each vowel.

Vowels according to Blake
	Front	Central	Back
Close	i		u
Mid	(ɛ)		
Open		a	

Vowels according to Hercus
	Front	Central	Back
Close	i		u
Mid	ɛ		(o)
Open		a	

==== Allophonic variation ====
Woiwurrung appears to have had a number of consistent allophonic variations in vowel sounds, particularly those following /w/ or when next to a laminal consonant. /a/ seems to have been pronounced closer to /æ/ when next to a laminal consonant and /ɒ/ when following /w/.

== Pronouns ==
In the case of the Woiwurrung pronouns, the stem seems to be the standard ngali 'you and I', but the front was suffixed to wa-, so wa+ngal combines to form wangal below. In Kulin languages there is no grammatical gender.

Person	Singular			Dual			Plural		
Person	Woi.	IPA	Eng.	Woi.	IPA	Eng.	Woi.	IPA	Eng.
1st Inc.				Wangal	[wa.ŋal]	We two (you)	Wanganyin	[wa.ŋa.ɲin]	We (& you)
1st Exc.	Wan	[wan]	I	Wangan	[wa.ŋan]	We two (not you)	Wanganyinyu	[wa.ŋa.ɲi.ɲu]	We (not you)
2nd	Warr	[war]	You	Wabul	[wa.bul]	You two	Wat gurrabil Wat gurrabilla Wat balak Wat wurdundhu	[wat ɡu.ra.bil] [wat ɡu.ra.bil.la] [wat ba.lak] [wat wu.ɖun.d̪u]	You
3rd	Munyi	[mu.ɲi]	He/She/It	Munyi gurrabil	[mu.ɲi ɡu.ra.bil]	Those two	Malu gurrabila	[ma.lu ɡu.ra.bi.la]	They

== Vocabulary ==
- biik = land, country
- boorondara = shade, darkness, night (origin of the name of the City of Boroondara)
- nyilum biik = poor soil / hard land (origin of the name of Nillumbik Shire)
- wominjeka = hello / welcome (womin = come, je [dji] = asking to come, ka = purpose)
- yabber = to talk (this word, with the same meaning, has made its way into informal English)
- yarra = flowing, (also means "hair"). It is thought to have been mistakenly given to the Yarra River (referred to as Birrarrung in the Woiwurrung language) by an early settler who asked a boy what it was called, who was confused and answered "it is flowing".

=== Number and sign system ===
A numbering system was used when Wurundjeri clans sent out messengers to advise neighbouring clans of upcoming events, such as a ceremony, corroboree, a challenge to fight or Marn grook ball game. Messengers carried a message stick with markings to indicate the number and type of people involved and a prop to indicate the type of event, such as a ball for a Marn grook event. The location of meeting was spoken, but neighbouring clans might not use the same language, so a sign language was used to indicate the number of days in the future when the people should assemble. The number was indicated by pointing to a location on the body from 1 to 16. After 16, at the top of the head, the count follows the equivalent locations across the other side of the body.

Numeral	Spoken number	Sign of the number	Literal meaning
1	bubupi-muningya	little finger	child of the hand
2	bulato-ravel	third finger	little larger
3	bulato	middle finger	larger
4	urnung-meluk	forefinger	urnung means a direction, meluk means a large grub found in some eucalypti
5	babungyi-muningya	thumb	the mother of the hand
6	krauel	wrist-joint	
7	ngurumbul	the divergence of the radial tendons	a fork
8	jeraubil	the swelling of the radial muscles	
9	thambur	the inside of the elbow-joint	a round place
10	berbert	biceps	the ringtail possum and also the name of the armlet made from the pelt of that animal, worn on the bicep during festive occasions
11	wulung	shoulder-joint	
12	krakerap	the collar-bone	the place where the bag hangs by its band
13	gurnbert	the neck	reed necklace, or place where the reed necklace is worn
14	kurnagor	the lobe of the ear	the point or end of a hill, or of a spur or ridge
15	ngarabul	the side of the skull	a range or the ridge of a hill
16	bundial	top of the head	the cutting-place, the place where the mourner cuts himself with some sharp instrument, from budagra meaning to cut
17+	From the top of the head, the count follows the equivalent locations across the other side of the body. 17 is the other side of the skull.		

== See also ==
- Kulin nation
- Wurundjeri
