= Mildura Cultivator =

Former newspaper in Victoria, Australia

The Mildura Cultivator (1888–1920) was a weekly newspaper, the second newspaper to be published in Mildura, Victoria.

== History ==
It was first published on Thursday 19 May 1888, as the official organ of Chaffey Brothers, founders of the irrigation settlement. The paper later went to bi-weekly, published on Wednesdays and Saturdays.

The Mildura Cultivator, Merbein Irrigationist and Mildura Telegraph were amalgamated in 1920 to be replaced by the Sunraysia Daily, whose managing editor was Harry J. Stephens, well known as "Uncle Wiseman" of the Farmer and Settler. The last edition was published on 29 September 1920.

== Personalities ==
(Samuel) Gifford Hall (1864–1952), who wrote as "Steele Blayde", was a noted horticulture and features writer, whose first article for the Cultivator was published on 24 August 1912.
