= Barababaraba dialect =

Extinct Pama–Nyungan language of Australia

Barababaraba
- Baraparapa
- Region: Victoria, New South Wales
- Ethnicity: Barapa Barapa
- Extinct: by 2016
- Language family: Pama–Nyungan: Kulinic; Kulin; Wemba–Wemba; Barababaraba
- Dialects: Barababaraba; Burabura

Language codes
- ISO 639-3: rbp
- Glottolog: bara1404
- AIATSIS: D5
- ELP: Barababaraba
- Location of Barababaraba Country in Victoria and New South Wales

Barababaraba (Baraba-Baraba), or Baraparapa, is an extinct Indigenous Australian language once spoken along the southern tributaries of the Murrumbidgee River, Victoria and New South Wales. It was a dialect of Wemba–Wemba.
