= Wadi Wadi dialect =

Extinct Australian Aboriginal language

Wadi-Wadi
- Native to: Australia
- Region: Victoria, New South Wales
- Ethnicity: Wadi Wadi, Weki Weki?
- Native speakers: nearly extinct
- Language family: Pama–Nyungan: Kulinic; Kulin; Wemba-Wemba; Madhi–Ladji–Wadi; Wadi-Wadi
- Dialects: Piangil

Language codes
- ISO 639-3: xwd
- Glottolog: wadi1260
- AIATSIS: D4
- ELP: Wadi-Wadi
- Location of Wadi Wadi Country in Victoria and New South Wales

Wadi-Wadi is an extinct Indigenous Australian language once spoken in Victoria and New South Wales.

Clark suggests that Jari Jari is a closely related language, but this name may refer to other languages.

== Phonology ==
=== Consonants ===
	Labial	Velar	Dental	Palatal	Alveolar	Retroflex
Plosive	p	k	t̪	c	t	ʈ
Nasal	m	ŋ	n̪	ɲ	n	ɳ
Rhotic					ɾ~r	ɻ
Lateral					l	
Approximant	w			j		

=== Vowels ===
	Front	Central	Back
High	i		u
Mid	e		
Low		a	

Vowels are heard as [ɪ, ɛ~ə, ɐ, ʊ] when in lax positions.
