= Kulin languages =

Pama–Nyungan language group of Australia

Kulin
- Geographic distribution: Victoria
- Ethnicity: Kulin
- Linguistic classification: Pama–Nyungan: Kulinic; Kulin
- Subdivisions: Woiwurrung–Taungurung–Bunurong; Wadawurrung; Djadjawurrung †; Bindjali †; Wemba Wemba †; Djabwurrung; Western Central Murray

Language codes
- Glottolog: nucl1335
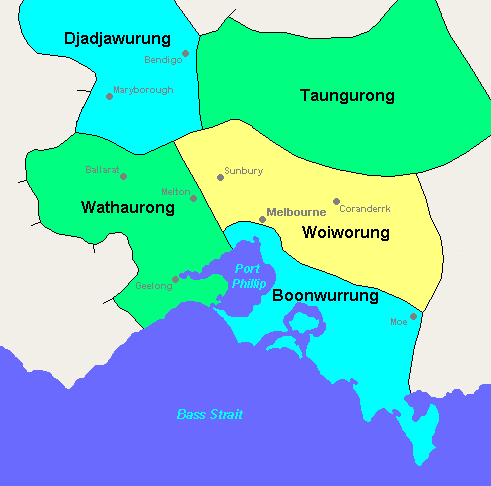
- The five Kulin nations

The Kulin languages are a group of closely related languages of the Kulin people, part of the Kulinic branch of Pama–Nyungan.

== Languages ==
- Woiwurrung (Woy-wur-rung): spoken from Mount Baw Baw in the east to Mount Macedon, Sunbury and Gisborne in the west. The Wurrundjeri-willam were a clan who occupied the Yarra River and its tributaries. Referred to initially by Europeans as the Yarra Yarra tribe. Other Woiwurrung clans include the Marin-Bulluk, Kurung-Jang-Bulluk, Wurundjeri-Balluk, Balluk-willam. Wurundjeri is now the common term for descendants of all the Woiwurrung clans.
- Bunurong (Bun-wurrung): spoken by six clans along the coast from the Werribee River, across the Mornington Peninsula, Western Port Bay to Wilsons Promontory. Referred to by Europeans as the Western Port or Port Philip tribe. The Yalukit-willam clan occupied the thin coastal strip from Werribee, to Williamstown. Bunurong is now the common term for all the people of this language group.
- Taungurung (Tung-ger-rung): spoken north of the Great Dividing Range in the Goulburn River Valley around Mansfield, Benalla and Heathcote. Referred to by Europeans as the Goulburn River tribe. Taungurung is now the common term for all the people of this language group.
- Wathaurong (Wadha-wurrung): spoken by 15 clans south of the Werribee River and the Bellarine Peninsula to Streatham. Referred to by Europeans as the Barrabool people. The escaped convict, William Buckley lived with this community for 32 years, between 1803 and 1835, before being found by John Batman on 6 July 1835.
- Dja Dja Wurrung (Jar-Jar-wur-rung: spoken by the 16 clans of the Jaara or Dja Dja Wurrung people around Bendigo, the central highlands region, east to Kyneton, west to the Pyrenees, north to Boort and south to the Great Dividing Range. Referred to by Europeans as the Loddon Aborigines.

Kulin, or perhaps Kulinic:

- Western Central Murray: Madhi-Madhi (Muthimuthi), Ledji-Ledji, and Wadi-Wadi share 80% of vocabulary, suggesting they might have formed a group.
- Eastern Central Murray: Wemba Wemba (Baraba-Baraba, Nari-Nari)
- Tjapwurrung (Jab-wurrung, Djabwarrung) as a distinct language is included by Bowern (2011), who excludes Taungurung and Baraba-Baraba.
- Bindjali, the language of the Bodaruwitj (Bedaruwidj, Potaruwutj, Tatiara) people in south-eastern South Australia, is classified as a Kulinic language by Austlang.

== Classification ==
Dixon (2002) accepts the Kulin languages as a family, and sees them as forming three languages:

- Kulin
  - Wuy-wurrung
    - Wuy-wurrung dialect
    - Bun-wurrung dialect
    - Dhagung-wurrung dialect (the first three entries above)
  - Wadha-wurrung (Wuddyawurru, Witouro)
  - Wemba Wemba
    - Jaja-wurrung dialect
    - Madhi-Madhi dialect
    - Ladji-Ladji dialect
    - Wadi-Wadi dialect
    - Nari-Nari dialect
    - Wemba Wemba dialect
    - Baraba-Baraba dialect
    - Wergaya dialect
    - Djadjala dialect
    - Wutjabulak dialect
    - Martijali dialect
    - Buibatyalli dialect
    - Nundatyalli dialect
    - Jab-wurrung dialect
    - Pirt-Koopen-Noot dialect
