= Latji-Latji dialect =

Australian Aboriginal language

Ladji Ladji
- Ledji-Ledji
- Native to: Australia
- Region: New South Wales, Victoria
- Ethnicity: Latjilatji
- Native speakers: 10 (2005)
- Language family: Pama–Nyungan: Kulinic; Wemba-Wemba; Madhi–Ladji–Wadi; Ladji Ladji

Language codes
- ISO 639-3: llj
- Glottolog: ladj1234
- AIATSIS: S23
- ELP: Ladji Ladji
- Location of Latji Latji Country in Victoria

Ladji Ladji (Ledji-Ledji) is a moribund Australian Aboriginal language once widely spoken in New South Wales and Victoria by the Latjilatji (or Ladji Ladji) people.

Ladji Ladji is part of the Kulin branch of the Pama–Nyungan family of languages, which were spoken by the majority of Aboriginal Australians before Australia's colonisation by the British Empire.
