= Warkawarka =

Australian aboriginal group

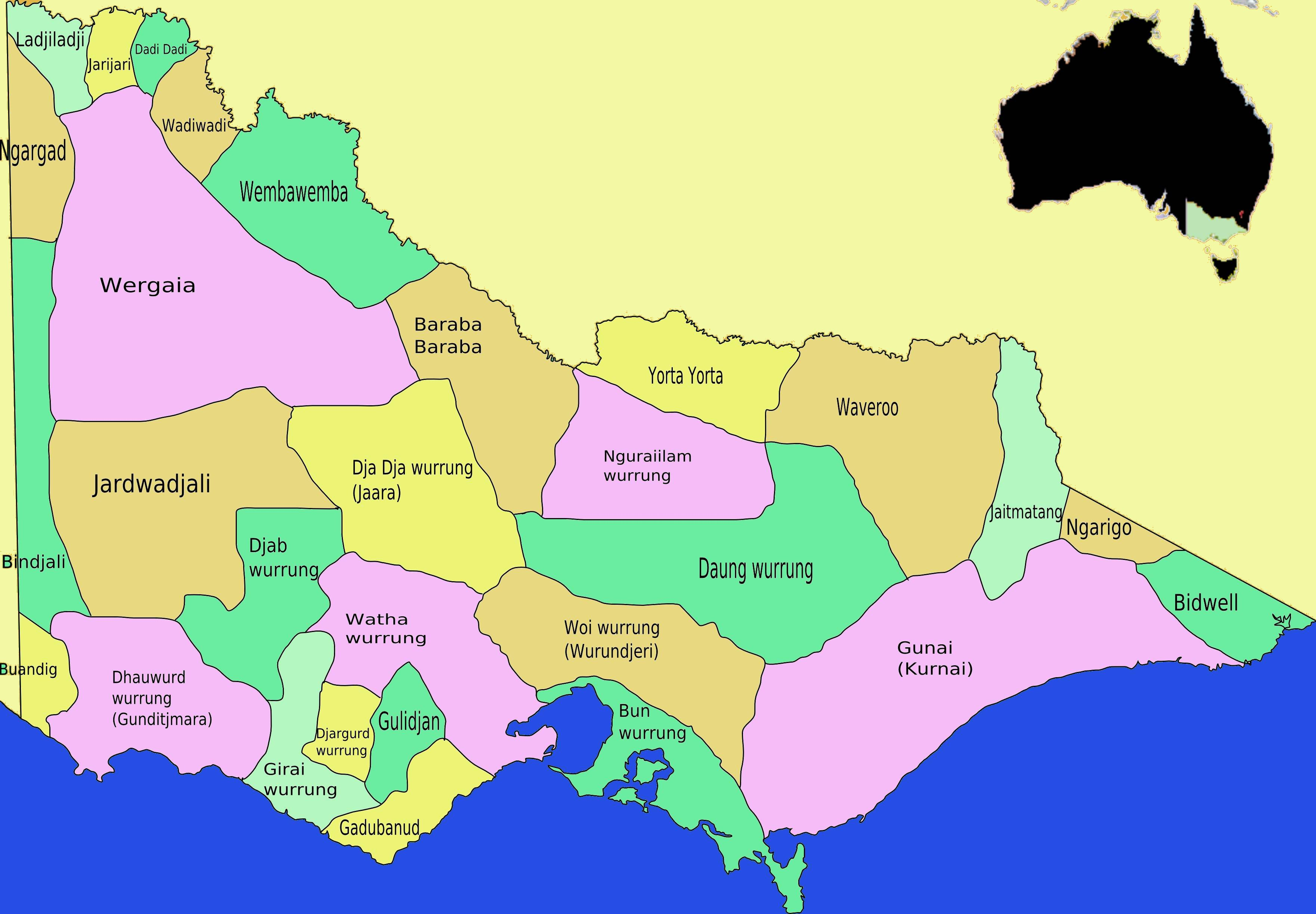
Victoria Aboriginal tribes

The Warkawarka, also called Weki Weki, were an Australian Aboriginal group whose traditional lands are located in Victoria, Australia. Controversy exists as to whether they were an independent tribe or rather consisted of a subgroup of the Wergaia, the latter view being shared by both Robert M. W. Dixon and Luise Hercus.

== Name ==
The ethnonym seems to derive from their word for "no" (warki=warka), though the name itself, warkawarka or wargawarga may be a variant of the ethnonym for the Wergaia.

== Country ==
The Warkawarka tribal lands extended over approximately 2,000 square miles (5,200 km^{2}), from Tyrrell Creek and Lake Tyrrell, southwards to Warracknabeal and Birchip. Their western boundary lay along Hopetoun, and they also ranged over the Morton Plains.

== Alternative names ==
- Booroung, Boorong
- Mirdiragoort
- Waikywaiky
- Weki-weki
- Wengenmarongeitch
- Werkawerka
- Wirtu, Wirtoo

== Some words ==
- wirtu (man)

== Sources ==
- Beveridge, Peter (1865) [First published 1861]. "A few notes on the dialects, habits, customs and mythology of the Lower Murray aborigines". Transactions of the Royal Society of Victoria. 6. Melbourne: 14–24.
- Beveridge, Peter (1883). "Of the aborigines inhabiting the great lacustrine and Riverine depression of the Lower Murray". Journal and Proceedings of the Royal Society of New South Wales. 17. Melbourne: 19–74.
- Clark, Ian (1995). Scars in the Landscape: A Register of Massacre Sites in Western Victoria, 1803-1859. Aboriginal Studies Press. ISBN 978-0-855-75595-9.
- Clark, Ian D. (1998). "That's My Country Belonging to Me": Aboriginal Land Tenure and Dispossession in Nineteenth Century Western Victoria. Melbourne: Heritage Matters. ISBN 978-1-876-40406-2.
- Howitt, Alfred William (1904). The native tribes of south-east Australia (PDF). Macmillan.
- Mathews, R. H. (January 1898). "Initiation ceremonies of Australian tribes.Appendix Nguttan initiation ceremony". Proceedings of the American Philosophical Society. 37 (157). Melbourne: 54–73. JSTOR 983694.
- Smyth, Robert Brough (1878). The Aborigines of Victoria: with notes relating to the habits of the natives of other parts of Australia and Tasmania (PDF). Vol. 1. Melbourne: J. Ferres, gov't printer.
- Stanbridge, William Edward (1858). "On the Astronomy and Mythology of the Aborigines of Victoria" (PDF). Transactions Philosophical Institute Victoria. 2: 137–140.
- Tindale, Norman Barnett (1974). "Warkawarka (VIC)". Aboriginal Tribes of Australia: Their Terrain, Environmental Controls, Distribution, Limits, and Proper Names. Australian National University Press.
