= Nari-Nari =

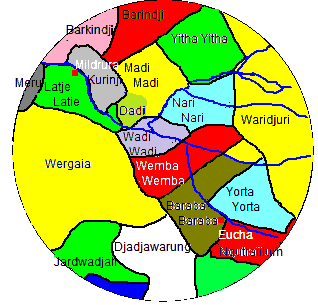
Country of the Nari-Nari

The Nari-Nari are an Indigenous Australian group in the Riverina region of New South Wales, Australia. The Nari-Nari are believed by historians to have formed in the Balranald area on the lower Murrumbidgee River, from the amalgamation of a number of groups in neighbouring areas such as the Wiradjuri and the Watiwati. The Nari-Nari share a western border with the Muthi Muthi tribe.

== Language ==
Nari Nari, a dialect of Wemba Wemba, is as of 2020 part of a language revival project. The word nari corresponds to the English word "no".

== Country ==
Nari-Nari country consists of some 14,000 square kilometres (5,500 sq mi) of land. The western border lay on the southern bank of the Lachlan River, from Booligal, to just above Balranald. From here, running eastwards it followed the line of the Murrumbidgee River to Hay; south to about Booroorban. The Wemba-Wemba tribal frontier formed its southern border, while the Barababaraba lay on its southeastern flank. To their northwest were the Jitajita.

Today the Nari-Nari people are represented by the Nari-Nari Tribal Council, formed in 2000. The council has, through the Indigenous Land Corporation, purchased two stations west of Hay to ensure the continued protection of the sites.

== Sources ==
- "Aboriginal heritage - the Nari-Nari tribe". Make Hay Shine!. Hay Tourism & Development. Archived from the original on 6 October 2007.
- Hercus, Luise (1989). "Three Linguistic Studies from Far South-Western NSW" (PDF). Aboriginal History. 13 (1): 45–62.
- Tindale, Norman Barnett (1974). "Narinari (NSW)". Aboriginal Tribes of Australia: Their Terrain, Environmental Controls, Distribution, Limits, and Proper Names. Australian National University Press. ISBN 978-0-708-10741-6.
