= Madhi Madhi dialect =

Australian Aboriginal language

Madhi-Madhi
- Native to: Australia
- Region: New South Wales
- Ethnicity: Madhi Madhi
- Extinct: late 20th century, with the death of Jack Long
- Revival
- Language family: Pama–Nyungan: Kulinic; Madhi–Ladji–Wadi; Madhi-Madhi

Language codes
- ISO 639-3: dmd
- Glottolog: madh1244
- AIATSIS: D8
- ELP: Mathi-Mathi

Madhi-Madhi, also known as Muthimuthi or Madi Madi, is an Indigenous Australian language spoken by the Muthi Muthi Aboriginal people of south-west New South Wales. It is also known as Madhi Madhi, Madi Madi, Bakiin, Mataua, Matimati, Matthee matthee, Moorta Moorta, Mudhi Mudhi, Muthimuthi, Muti muti, Muttee Muttee, Madimadi, Mutte Mutte, or Madi madi.

Luise Hercus published in 1989 a substantial amount of Madhi Madhi language data recorded from Jack Long, whom she described as "the last Madimadi man" and the last speaker of the language.

== Phonology ==
=== Consonants ===
	Labial	Velar	Dental	Palatal	Alveolar	Retroflex
Plosive	p	k	t̪	(c)	t	ʈ
Nasal	m	ŋ	n̪	(ɲ)	n	ɳ
Rhotic					ɾ	
Lateral			l̪		l	ɭ
Approximant	w			j		

/t̪, n̪/ are heard as palatal [c, ɲ] when before front vowels.

Voicing among stops /p, k, t̪~c, t, ʈ/ as [b, ɡ, d̪~ɟ, d, ɖ] may also be heard in syllable-initial positions or when following nasal sounds.

/t̪/ can be lenited as [θ] when in intervocalic positions, and as [ð] in post-nasal, word-medial position.

=== Vowels ===
	Front	Central	Back
High	i		u
Mid	e		
Low		a	

Vowels are heard as [ɪ, ɛ~ə, ɐ, ʊ] when in lax positions.
