= Barababaraba =

Aboriginal Australian people

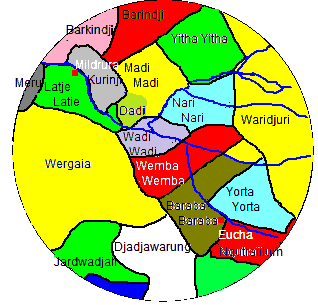
Traditional lands of the Barababaraba

The Barababaraba people (also spelt Barapabarapa) are an indigenous Australian people whose territory covered parts of southern New South Wales and northern Victoria. They had close connections with the Wemba Wemba.

Barababaraba have extensive shared country with their traditional neighbours, the Wemba Wemba and Yorta Yorta, covering what is now Deniliquin, the Kow Swamp and Perrricoota/Koondrook.

The Barababaraba form part of the North-West Nations Aboriginal Cultural Heritage Group, and undertake significant cultural heritage and Natural Resource Management work in the area.

== Language ==
R. H. Mathews wrote an early sketch of the grammar of the Barababaraba language, and stated that one dialect at least existed, spoken on the Murray River near Swan Hill.

== Country ==
Barababaraba territory, which covered areas in what are now the states of New South Wales and Victoria, is estimated to have been some 9,300 square kilometres (3,600 sq mi) of land, southern tributaries of the Murrumbidgee River from above Hay down to Kerang. One early source also has them, perhaps a distinct horde, present in Moulamein. (Note: R. H. Mathews recorded some of their language from Informants in Moulamein (Mathews 1904, p. 291).) It included Cohuna, Gunbower, Brassi, Conargo, and the land south of Carrathool. Deniliquin Their neighbours to the north west were the Wemba Wemba, the Wergaia frontier was directly to the west, the Yorta Yorta boundaries ran north and south to their east. The Dja Dja Wurrung lay to the south.

== Social organization ==
The Barababaraba hordes had a moiety (kin ship) society divided into two phratries, each comprising two sections. The rules of marriage and affiliation are as follows. (Note: The terms, save for one and consonantal doubling are almost identical to those given for the Gamilaraay system by Alfred William Howitt in 1884 (Palmer & Howitt 1884, p. 341))

Phratry A:

- (a) a Murri man marries an Ippatha woman. Their sons are Umbi, daughters Butha.
- (b) a Kubbi man marries a Butha woman. Their sons are Ippai, daughters Ippatha.

Phratry B

- (a) An Ippai man marries a Matha woman. Their sons are Kubbi, daughters Kubbitha.
- (b) An Umbi man marries a Kubbitha woman. Their sons are Murri, daughters Matha. (Note: Exceptions exist, with a Murri marrying a Butha, or Kubbi an Ippatha. Strictly speaking, this diagram would imply a brother's child can marry his sister's child, but this is rigorously forbidden. A brother's child's offspring may marry a sister's child's offspring (Mathews 1904, p. 294).)

In terms of initiation ceremonies, the Barababaraba rites were essentially the same as those prevailing among the Wiradjuri.

== Lifestyle ==
The Barababaraba were one of the Murray River Wongal-chewing groups: wangul bulrushes were chewed both for the tuberous pith and for the fibrous cortex which was torn away to obtain the latter. The fibre was conserved to make strings for fashioning nets and bags.

== History ==
A mortar in Barababaraba territory, at Koondrook Perricoota Forest near Barbers Creek, was recovered in 2012 and an analysis led to the suggestion that it might have been employed to grind gypsum, used by more northerly tribes in funerals, but here perhaps for obtaining a corroboree body paint.

== Alternative names ==
- Barapa Barapa, Barapabarapa
- Birraba-birraba, Burreba-burreba
- Boorabirraba
- Booraboora
- Boort (toponym)
- Bureba, Burabura
- Burrabura-ba, Baraba-baraba, Barraba-barraba, Bareber Bareber
- Burrappa, Burrapper, Burapper, Barappu
- Karraba (typo)
- Perrepa Perrepa

== Some words ==
- bangga (a boy)
- barapa (no)
- dyelli-dyellic (yesterday)
- gillaty (today)
- kurregurk (a girl)
- lêurk (a woman)
- ngungni (yes)
- perbur (tomorrow)
- wutthu (a man)

Source: Mathews 1904, pp. 291, 293

== Sources ==
- "AIATSIS map of Indigenous Australia". AIATSIS. 14 May 2024.
- Barwick, Diane E. (1984). McBryde, Isabel (ed.). "Mapping the past: an atlas of Victorian clans 1835-1904". Aboriginal History. 8 (2): 100–131. JSTOR 24045800.
- Beveridge, Peter (1883). "Of the aborigines inhabiting the great lacustrine and Riverine depression of the Lower Murray". Journal and Proceedings of the Royal Society of New South Wales. 17. Melbourne: 19–74. doi:10.5962/p.358946 – via BHL.
- Gott, Beth (April 1982). "Ecology of Root Use by the Aborigines of Southern Australia". Archaeology in Oceania. 17 (1). Melbourne: 59–67. doi:10.1002/j.1834-4453.1982.tb00039.x. JSTOR 40386580.
- Mathews, R. H. (1904). "The Wiradyuri and Other Languages of New South Wales". The Journal of the Anthropological Institute of Great Britain and Ireland. 34: 284–305. doi:10.2307/2843103. JSTOR 2843103.
- Palmer, Edward; Howitt, A. W. (1884). "Notes on Some Australian Tribes". Journal of the Anthropological Institute of Great Britain and Ireland. 13: 276–347. doi:10.2307/2841896. JSTOR 2841896.
- Pardoe, Colin (April 2012). "Burials from Barber Overflow, Koondrook State Forest, NSW". The Joint Indigenous Group. pp. 1–13.
- Pardoe, Colin (2013a). A Mortar from Perricoota State Forest. pp. 1–10.
- Pardoe, Colin (April 2013b). "Burials through the ages among the Barapa Barapa". The Joint Indigenous Group. pp. 1–5.
- Tindale, Norman Barnett (1974). "Baraparapa (NSW)". Aboriginal Tribes of Australia: Their Terrain, Environmental Controls, Distribution, Limits, and Proper Names. Australian National University Press. ISBN 978-0-708-10741-6.
- Weir, Jessica K; Ross, Steven L; Crew, David R J; Crew, Jeanette L (2013). Cultural water and the Edward/Kolety and Wakool river system (PDF). AIATSIS. ISBN 978-1-922-10206-5.
