= Ian D. Clark (historian) =

Australian historian

- Born: 1958 (age 67–68)
- Occupation: Professor of tourism
- Known for: Research on Victorian Aboriginal History and Toponymy

Ian D. Clark (born 1958) is an academic historian and Toponymist whose primary work has focused on Victorian Aboriginal history, aboriginal toponymy and the frontier conflict between Indigenous Australians and immigrant settlers during the European settlement of Victoria, Australia.

== Education and career ==
Studied Bachelor of Theology at the Melbourne College of Divinity, then a Bachelor of Arts (Hons) and Diploma of Education at Monash University. He completed his PhD in western Victorian Aboriginal historical geography at Monash University in 1992.

His academic posts have included working as a tutor / lecturer in geography, lecturer in tourism at Monash University, and as a research fellow in history from 1993–1995 at the Australian Institute of Aboriginal and Torres Strait Islander Studies. Since 2000 he has worked in the School of Business at the University of Ballarat first as a senior lecturer in Tourism and now occupies the position of Professor in Tourism.

He has worked extensively in the Victorian tourism industry with a focus on developing indigenous tourism material and facilities. For a time he was the manager of the Brambuk Aboriginal Cultural Centre in Halls Gap, Gariwerd. He has also worked as senior researcher in the Koori Tourism Unit of the former Victorian Tourism Commission from 1989–1991.

In 2005 he was chair of the Victorian State Committee of the Australian National Placenames Survey.

== Historical research ==
He has written extensively on Victorian Aboriginal history including editing the journals of George Augustus Robinson. He worked with The Victorian Aboriginal Corporation for Languages and in 2002 published the Dictionary of Aboriginal Placenames of Victoria and several related regional placename publications. He was one of the organisers of the second Trends in Toponymy conference in Ballarat in 2007, and is researching a book on Aboriginal toponymy for the ANU E-Press series.

Other important published research includes work on massacre sites in Western Victoria in the 1995 publication Scars in the landscape : a register of massacre sites in Western Victoria 1803–1859. The interaction between the Wurundjeri people and the early settlement of Melbourne was told in the 2004 book – A bend in the Yarra : a history of the Merri Creek Protectorate Station and Merri Creek Aboriginal School 1841–1851, which Clark co-authored with Toby Heydon.

Clark has also written on the Aboriginal presence on the Ballarat goldfields in the 1850s noting that while there is no evidence for any direct involvement of Aboriginal people in the events of the Eureka Rebellion in 1854, aboriginal people may be relevant to the Eureka story through the event taking place on Wathaurong aboriginal land. The early policing of the Goldfield was done by the Native Police Corps, and oral history that Aboriginal people looked after some of the children of the Eureka miners after the military storming of the Eureka Stockade and subsequent massacre of miners.

== Major works ==
- Scars in the landscape : a register of massacre sites in Western Victoria 1803–1859 (1995), AIATSIS, ISBN 0-85575-281-5
- A bend in the Yarra : a history of the Merri Creek Protectorate Station and Merri Creek Aboriginal School 1841–1851 / Ian D. Clark and Toby Heydon. Aboriginal Studies Press, 2004. ISBN 0-85575-469-9
- The Port Phillip journals of George Augustus Robinson : 8 March – 7 April 1842 and 18 March – 29 April 1843 / edited and with an introduction by Ian D. Clark. Robinson, George Augustus, 1791–1866. Published Melbourne: Department of Geography, Monash University, 1988. ISBN 0-909685-38-X
- Sharing history : a sense for all Australians of a shared ownership of their history, Council for Aboriginal Reconciliation. Published: Canberra : Australian Government Publishing Service, c1994. ISBN 0-644-32846-0 Online version
- Dictionary of Aboriginal placenames of Victoria / Ian D. Clark, Toby Heydon. Published: Melbourne : Victorian Aboriginal Corporation for Languages, 2002. ISBN 0-9579360-2-8
- The journals of George Augustus Robinson, chief protector, Port Phillip Aboriginal Protectorate / Ian D. Clark, editor 2nd edition Published: Melbourne, Vic. : Heritage Matters, 2000. ISBN 1-876404-15-9
- The Yalukit-willam : the first people of the City of Hobsons Bay, Published: Hobsons Bay City Council, 2001. ISBN 0-646-41669-3
- Aboriginal languages and clans : an historical atlas of western and central Victoria, 1800–1900, Published: Melbourne, Vic. : Dept. of Geography and Environmental Science, Monash University, c1990. ISBN 0-909685-41-X
- Place names and land tenure : windows into Aboriginal landscapes : essays in Victorian Aboriginal history / Ian D. Clark. Published: Ballarat, Vic., Ballarat Heritage Services, c2003. ISBN 978-1876404079

Note: this is a list of major published writings, not a full list of research or publications.
