= Wemba Wemba dialect =

Extinct Australian Aboriginal language

Wemba-Wemba
- Region: Victoria
- Ethnicity: Wemba-Wemba
- Extinct: (date missing)
- Language family: Pama–Nyungan: Kulinic; Kulin; Western Victoria; Wemba-Wemba

Language codes
- ISO 639-3: xww
- Glottolog: wemb1241
- AIATSIS: D1
- ELP: Wemba-Wemba
- Location of Wemba Wemba Country in Victoria and New South Wales

Wemba Wemba is an extinct Aboriginal Australian language that was spoken by the Wemba-Wemba people along the Murray River and its tributaries in north-western Victoria and south-central New South Wales.

== Classification ==
Wemba Wemba is a Kulin language, of the Pama-Nyungan family.

=== Dialects ===
Barababaraba was a dialect of Wemba Wemba. Nari Nari may have also been a dialect.

== Etymology ==
The language's name follows the reduplicating pattern of many Aboriginal language names: wemba translates to "no".

== Phonology ==
=== Consonants ===
	Labial	Dental	Alveolar	Palatal	Retroflex	Velar
Stop	p	t̪	t	c	ʈ	k
Nasal	m		n	ɲ	ɳ	ŋ
Lateral			l		ɭ	
Rhotic			r		ɽ	
Approximant	w			j		

=== Vowels ===
	Front	Central	Back
Close	ɪ, i		ʊ, u
Mid	ɛ, e	ə	ɔ, o
Open		a	

Voiced consonant sounds only occur within prenasalized stops. Prenasal consonants include: /mb/ /nd/ /ndy/ /ng/ and /rnd/. In phonetic form they are pronounced as [mb] [nd] [ɲɟ] [ŋɡ] and [ɳɖ].

== Vocabulary ==
Below is a basic vocabulary list from Blake (1981).

English	Wemba-Wemba
man	beng
woman	lerg
mother	guinggurin
father	mam
head	murreng
eye	mir
nose	ganyug
ear	wirimbula
mouth	dyarb
tongue	dyaling
tooth	lia
hand	manye
breast	gurm
stomach	bili
urine	gir
faeces	guni
thigh	gareburdug
foot	dyine
bone	merderug
blood	gurg
dog	wilgar
snake	gurnwil
kangaroo	gure (grey), bara (red)
possum	wile
fish	yauwirr
spider	wirimbeliny
mosquito	liri
emu	dyurung-wil
eaglehawk	banggel
crow	wa
sun	nyaui
star	durd
stone	la
water	gaden
camp	lar
fire	wanab
smoke	burd
meat	benggug
stand	dyerriga
sit	nyengga
see	nyaga
go	yangga
get	garga
hit	daga (barrangguna 'kill')
I	yandang
you	ngin
one	gebin
two	buledya

== Influence on English ==
At least four botanical terms in Australian English are thought to have been introduced into local speech from Wemba-Wemba:

- dilanj = nitre bush/dillon
- lerep = lerp/honeydew or lerp manna
- gambang = bulrush/cumbungi
- mali = mallee
- The word yabby, a type of crayfish, comes from Wemba-Wemba.
