= Kulinic languages =

Pama–Nyungan language branch of Australia

Kulinic
- Kulin–Bunganditj
- Geographic distribution: Victoria (Australia)
- Linguistic classification: Pama–Nyungan: Southeastern; Victorian; Kulin–Bunganditj; Kulinic
- Subdivisions: Kulin; Kolakngat; Drual

Language codes
- Glottolog: kuli1256
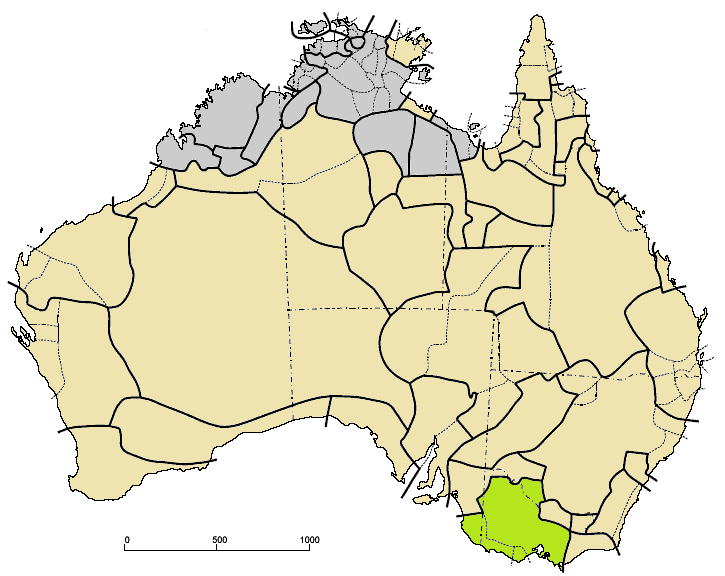
- Kulinic languages (green) among other Pama–Nyungan (tan). Along the coast, the three groups are (west to east) Drual, Kolakngat, Kulin.

The Kulinic languages form a branch of the Pama–Nyungan family in Victoria (Australia). They are:

- Kulin (3+, e.g. Woiwurrung)
- Kolakngat
- Drual (2)

Warrnambool is Kulinic and may be Drual, but is too poorly attested to be certain. Glottolog now classes both Warrnambool and those languages sometimes classed as Drual in a family, calling it "Warrnambool-Bunganditj", and Kolakngat as in the Kulin family. Gadubanud was a dialect of either Warrnambool or Kolakngat. Several poorly attested interior Kulinic languages, such as Wemba-Wemba, are listed in the Kulin article.

The three branches of Kulinic are not close; Dixon treats them as three separate families.

== Bibliography ==
- Dixon, R. M. W. 2002. Australian Languages: Their Nature and Development. Cambridge University Press
