= Girai wurrung =

Aboriginal Australian people of present-day western Victoria

Girai Wurrung
Regions with significant populations

Languages
- Girai Wurrung, English

Religion
- Australian Aboriginal mythology, Christianity

Related ethnic groups
- Gulidjan, Djargurd Wurrung, Djab Wurrung and Wada wurrung see List of Indigenous Australian group names

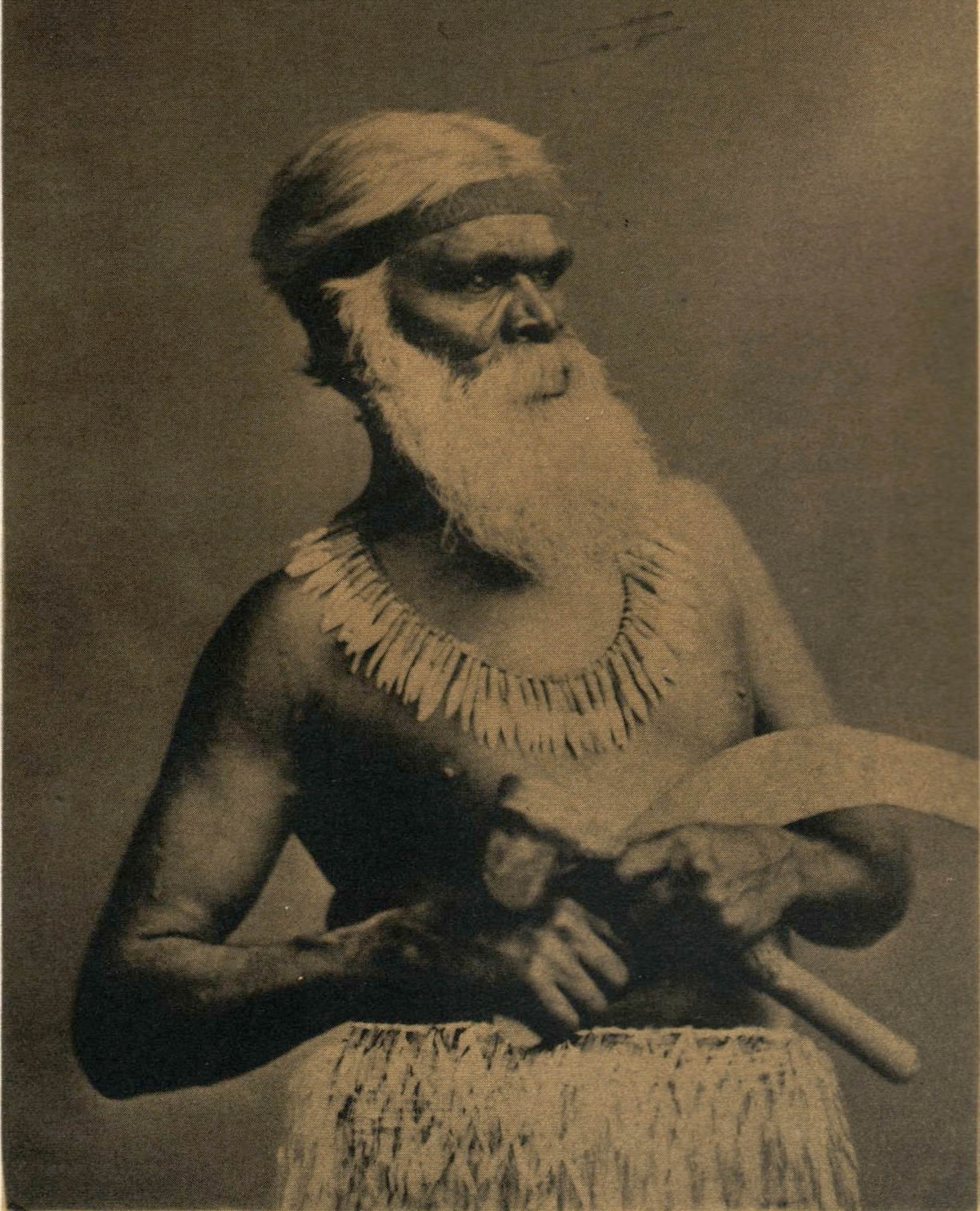
Kaarwin Kuunawarn (hissing swan) was the clan-head of the Gunaward gundidj clan of the Girai Wurrung of Lake Connewarren, west of Mortlake.

The Girai wurrung, also spelt Kirrae Wuurong and Kirrae Whurrung, are an Aboriginal Australian people who traditionally occupied the territory between Mount Emu Creek and the Hopkins River up to Mount Hamilton, and the Western Otways from the Gellibrand River to the Hopkins River, in what is now the state of Victoria. The historian Ian D. Clark has reclassified much of the material regarding them in Norman Tindale's compendium under the Djargurd Wurrung, a term reflecting the assumed pre-eminence of one of their clans, the Jacoort/Djargurd.

== Language ==
The Giray language (Girai wurrung meaning literally "blood lip language") spoke a dialect of Dhauwurd Wurrung language ("the Warrnambool language"), which belongs to the Kulinic branch of the Pama-Nyungan language family. James Dawson and his daughter Isabella took down extensive vocabulary lists of it and related dialects. A dictionary of the language was compiled in the 1990s.

== Country ==
The Girai lands comprised 1,900 square miles (4,900 km^{2}) of territory from Warrnambool and Hopkins River down to the coast at Princetown. The northern boundary was at Lake Bolac and Darlington. To the east their land extended beyond Camperdown. The tribes on their borders were, to the north, the Djab wurrung and Wathaurong, to their west were the Dhauwurd wurrung and the Djargurd Wurrung. On their eastern flank were the Gulidjan and Gadubanud.

== History ==
The first European to visit Girai territory was the explorer Edward Eyre. As pastoralists began to penetrate their region and take up squatting runs for their livestock, the Giray responded by waging a frontier guerilla war to hinder the expropriations. An Aboriginal reserve was established at Framlington in Girai wurrung territory bordering the Gunditjmara (Dhauwurd wurrung) people.

== Clan system ==
The Girai wurrung people had 21 clans, differing slightly in dialect, with a patriarchal hierarchy and a matrilineally based descent system based on the gabadj (Black Cockatoo) and guragidj (White Cockatoo) moieties.

No	Clan name	Approximate location
1	Baradh gundidj	mouth of Curdies River
2	Badadgil gundidj	Allandale station
3	Burug gundidj	Mount Shadwell
4	Duram gundidj	Tooram station
5	Flat Topped Hill clan	Flat Topped Hill
6	Garar gundidj	north of Mount Warrnambool
7	Garngigung gundidj	Ecklin swamp and keayang swamp
8	Gilambidj gundidj	Lake Keilambete
9	Gilidmurar gundidj	Framlingham
10	Gulag gundidj	Kona Warren and Merrang stations on the Hopkins River
11	Gular gundidj	southwest of Lake Keilambete
12	Gun gundidj	Yaloak swamp
13	Gunawurd gundidj	Lake Connewarren
14	Gunindarar	The Sisters
15	Ngalug barar balug	midway between Mount Shadwell and Lake Bolac
16	Mount Noorat clan	Mount Noorat and Pejark marsh
17	Ngaragurd gundidj	Port Campbell bay
18	Purteet chowel gundidj	southeast of Lake Bolac, including Mount Hamilton
19	Lake Terang clan	Lake Terang
20	Warnambul gundidj	Mount Warrnambool
21	Yelingamadj gundidj	Lake Elingamite

Norman Tindale said they were grouped into 12 "hordes" (kin groups), which he lists as follows:

- Bolaga/ Bolagher (group at Lake Bolac)
- Dantgurt
- Manmait
- Elingamait
- Barrath
- Warnambu (Pertobe)
- Jarcoort (believed to be a group at that place). Known as the Tampirr gundidj.
- Colongulac
- Tooram
- Narragoort
- Coonawanee

The clans gathered with the Djab wurrung, Dhauwurd wurrung and Wada wurrung peoples to harvest eels at Lake Bolac. They also met at Mirraewuae swamp near Hexham to hunt emus and other game and to conduct business.

== History ==
On first sighting a European ship off the coast, the Giray took it for a monster from the deep called Koorung in their traditional law, and fled the area. European settlement of the area began in 1838 and in the early 1840s the Girai wurrung engaged in a sustained guerilla war with the encroaching pastoralists. Dispossession from their land led to starvation and the theft of sheep resulted in murderous reprisals. In early 1839, Frederick Taylor, the manager at George McKillop and James Smith's station at Glenormiston, on being informed that around 50 members of the Jarcoort clan were camped in a gully at Mount Emu creek (the site was known as Tampirr), not far from Camperdown. Taylor rounded up a squatter vigilante band and virtually wiped out the whole group, men, women and children. Ian D. Clark states the estimated deaths at 35–40. A few survived, one woman called Bareetch Chuumeen, managed to swim to safety across Lake Bullen with her child on her shoulders. The place thereafter was called 'Murdering Gully.' places this within Djargurd wurrung country.

Assistant Aboriginal Protector Charles Sievwright was successful in bringing charges against G.S. Bolden for killing 2 Gunawurd gundidj people on 27 October 1841, but Supreme Court Judge Willis acquitted Bolden in December 1841 of the charges and spoke of the right of squatter licencees to turn anyone off their property. This decision was made despite the conditional nature of the squatter's licence by the Government to allow for Aboriginal access for hunting and traditional use.

During 1841 Assistant Protector CW Sievwright set up headquarters at two locations: Lake Keilambete and Lake Terang, but these were only temporary and Sievwright was ordered by Robinson to move to Mount Rouse in February 1842.

When Framlingham Aboriginal Reserve was occupied in 1865 near Warrnambool many of the surviving members of the Girai wurrung joined the reserve along with surviving Djargurd wurrung who were forcibly relocated and Gunditjmara from Warrnambool. Gunditjmara from Portland and Lake Condah refused to settle at Framlingham, leading to the establishment of Lake Condah reserve in 1869.

The historian Ian Clark asserts that from 1868 the history of the Girai wurrung becomes the history of Framlingham.

== Alternative names ==
- Bolaga/ Bolagher (apparently the name for the group at Lake Bolac)
- Colongulac tribe (a clan group)
- Dantgurt, Dautgart, Tantgort, Targurt, Dyargurt
- Jarcoort (may refer to the group located at Jancourt)
- Kirawirung, Kirraewuurong
- Konoug-willam (typo?)
- Manmait
- Mount Shadwell tribe
- Ngutuk, meaning "you"
- Ngutung
- Warn tallin (western tribal exonym for them meaning "rough language")

Source: Tindale 1974, p. 205

== Sources ==
- Black, Maggie (2016). Up Came a Squatter: Niel Black of Glenormiston, 1839–1880. NewSouth. pp. 169–175. ISBN 978-1-742-24252-1.
- Blake, Barry J. (2011). Dialects of Western Kulin, Western Victoria Yartwatjali, Tjapwurrung, Djadjawurrung (PDF). La Trobe University. Archived from the original (PDF) on 20 December 2016.
- Clark, Ian D. (1995). Scars in the Landscape: a register of massacre sites in western Victoria, 1803–1859 (PDF). AIATSIS. pp. 169–175. ISBN 0-85575-281-5.
- Dixon, Robert M. W. (2002). Australian Languages: Their Nature and Development. Vol. 1. Cambridge University Press. ISBN 978-0-521-47378-1.
- Krishna-Pillay, Sharnthi (1996). A Dictionary of Keerraywoorroong and Related Dialects. Gunditjmara Aboriginal Cooperative. ISBN 978-0-646-28933-5.
- Tindale, Norman Barnett (1974). "Kirrae (VIC)". Aboriginal Tribes of Australia: Their Terrain, Environmental Controls, Distribution, Limits, and Proper Names. Australian National University Press. ISBN 978-0-708-10741-6. Archived from the original on 1 May 2017.
