= Djargurd Wurrong =

Aboriginal Australian people of Victoria

Regions with significant populations

Languages
- Djargurd Wurrong, English

Religion
- Australian Aboriginal mythology

Related ethnic groups
- Girai wurrung, Gunditjmara, Gulidjan, Djab wurrung and Wada wurrung see List of Aboriginal Australian group names

The Djargurd Wurrong (also spelt Djargurd Wurrung) are Aboriginal Australian people of the Western district of the State of Victoria, and traditionally occupied the territory between Mount Emu Creek and Lake Corangamite.

== Language ==
The Djargurd Wurrung people spoke the Djargurd Wurrung dialect of the Dhauwurd Wurrung language.

== Country ==
The classification of the Groups on this territory has been subject to controversy. Norman Tindale, referring to the same area, and clans, called them the Kirrae, whose lands he stated comprised in his estimate around 1,900 square miles (4,900 km^{2}) of territory from Warrnambool and the Hopkins River down to the coast at Princetown with the northerly reaches at Lake Bolac and Darlington, and extending easterly beyond Camperdown. The historian Ian Clark states that Tindale "failed to acknowledge the existence" of the Djargurd wurrung, while locating them in the same area. The Djagurd wurrung territory was bordered by the Wada wurrung in the north, the Dhauwurd wurrung to the west, the Girai wurrung to their south, and the Gulidjan in the east.

== History ==
The traditional lands of the Djargurd Wurrung and Gulidjan, including the Western District Lakes, now a Ramsar site, have been used by the indigenous peoples for thousands of years. There are many archaeological sites registered that include fish traps, surface scatters, middens and burial sites.

At the time of European settlement in the 1830s and 1840s the Djargurd suffered from massacres by European settlers in the Australian frontier wars, and also from attacks by the neighbouring Wada wurrung tribe. Dispossession from their land led to starvation and their theft of sheep resulted in murderous reprisals. In 1839 one clan, the Tarnbeere gundidj, was massacred by Frederick Taylor and others in a site that came to be known as Murdering Gully.

When the Aboriginal reserve was established in 1865 at Framlingham, near Warrnambool, many of the surviving members of the Djargurd wurrung were forcibly relocated. However, a number of elders refused to abandon their traditional country and stayed eking out a meagre living on the edge of towns like Camperdown. They were assisted by people such as James Dawson, a Scotsman, who acted as guardian and supported them with his own money.

In 1883 Wombeetch Puuyuun (also known as Camperdown George) died at the age of 43 and was buried in a bog outside the bounds of Camperdown Cemetery. On Dawson's return from a trip to Scotland he was shocked at where his friend had been buried and personally reburied Wombeetch in Camperdown Cemetery. He appealed for money to raise a monument, but with little public support, primarily funded the monument himself. The 7-metre (23 ft) obelisk was erected as a memorial to Wombeetch Puuyuun and the Aboriginal people of the district, and has been described as still inspiring today.

== Clan system ==
The Djargurd wurrung people had 12 clans under a matrilineal system with a descent system based on the Gabadj (black cockatoo) and Grugidj (white cockatoo) moieties. The clans intermarried with Gulidjan, Girai wurring, Djab wurrung and Wada wurrung peoples. The twelve clans are as follows:

No	Clan name	Approximate location
1	Barumbidj gundidj	Lake Purrumbete
2	Djargurd balug	Western bank of Lake corargamite
3	Koenghegulluc	Lake Colongulac and east of Mount Myrtoon
4	Korrungow werroke gundidj	Lake bookar and the cloven hills
5	Leehoorah gundidj	Mount Leura and Lakes Bullen-merri and Gnotuk
6	Mullungkil gundidj	south of Lake Purrumbete, including Mount Porndon
7	Netcunde	Cobrico Swamp, lake cobrico and Ewen hill
8	Tarnbeere gundidj	eastern bank of Mount Emu Creek
9	Teerinyillum gundidj	Mount Elephant
10	Uropine gundidj	Darlington
11	Wane gundidj colac	near Lake Elingamite
12	Worong gundidj	east of Lake Elingamite

== Sources ==
- Black, Maggie (2016). Up Came a Squatter: Niel Black of Glenormiston, 1839–1880. NewSouth. pp. 169–175. ISBN 978-1-742-24252-1.
- Broome, Richard (2005). Aboriginal Victorians: A History Since 1800. Allen & Unwin. ISBN 978-1-74114-569-4.
- Bulbeck, Chilla (1991). "Aborigines, memorials and the history of the frontier". Australian Historical Studies. 24 (96): 168–178. doi:10.1080/10314619108595878.
- Clark, Ian D. (1995). Scars in the Landscape: a register of massacre sites in western Victoria, 1803–1859 (PDF). AIATSIS. pp. 103–118. ISBN 0-85575-281-5.
- Dawson, James (1881). Australian Aborigines: The Languages and Customs of Several Tribes of Aborigines in the Western District of Victoria, Australia (PDF). Melbourne: George Robertson.
- Hale, J.; Butcher, R (2011). Ecological Character Description for the Western District Lakes Ramsar site (PDF). Canberra: Department of Sustainability, Environment, Water, Population and Communities.
- Tindale, Norman Barnett (1974). "Kirrae (VIC)". Aboriginal Tribes of Australia: Their Terrain, Environmental Controls, Distribution, Limits, and Proper Names. Australian National University Press. ISBN 978-0-708-10741-6.
