= Gulidjan =

Aboriginal Australian people of the Lake Colac region in Victoria

The Gulidjan people (perhaps originally Kolidjon, (Note: "There are also a number of spellings such as Colijon, Koligian, Colijan, Kolijin and Koladgin. These suggest a form Gulidjan (alternatively transcribed with an initial k and/or with o as the vowel of the first syllable). The vowel a tends to be pronounced as æ or ε following a palatal such as dj and this probably accounts for the spellings that suggest i in the final syllable." (Blake, Clark & Reid 2001, p. 155))), also known as the Kolakngat, or Colac tribe, are an Aboriginal Australian tribe whose traditional lands cover the Lake Colac region of the state of Victoria, Australia. They occupied the grasslands, woodlands, volcanic plains and lakes region east of Lake Corangamite, west of the Barwon River and north of the Otway Ranges. Their territory bordered the Wathaurong to the north, Djargurd Wurrung to the west, Girai Wurrung to the south-west, and Gadubanud to the south-east.

== Language ==
The Gulidjan language was first identified in 1839, although much of the detail and vocabulary has been lost, there is sufficient to confirm that it constituted a separate language. About 100 words of the Gulidjan language have survived. Some analysis suggests it may be a mixed language or creole language having something in common with each of the neighboring languages. The word Colac/Kokak derives from the Gulidjan word kulak (sand) and the suffix -gnat. The ethnonym was analysed by James Dawson, who transcribed it as Kolakgnat, to mean 'belonging to sand'.

Roughly 200 words and the translated text of the Lord's Prayer survive from the Gulidjan language.

== Country ==
The Gulidjan resided throughout some 900 square miles (2,300 km^{2}) near Lake Colac and Lake Corangamite, reaching down into harsh terrain towards Cape Otway. The inland boundary of their domain lay south of Cressy.

== History ==
The Gulidjan people were hit hard by the European colonisation of their land shortly after the foundation of Melbourne. For three years, the Gulidjan actively resisted invasion by driving off livestock and raiding stations. Such raids brought retaliation by parties of colonisers with violent clashes ensuing. According to Jan Critchett's study, an estimated 300-350 Aboriginal people were murdered in the 14 years from 1834 to 1848, during the colonial invasion of the Western District. The disappearance and presumed deaths of Joseph Gellibrand and George Hesse in 1837, whose fate remains a mystery to this day, were blamed on the Gulidjan. Retribution was meted out by a colonising party accompanied, by some Wathaurong people, and several Gulidjan people were killed. Historian Ian Clark reports on three documented attacks in 1839-1840 resulting in Aboriginal deaths. (Note: Arthur Lloyd and a certain Taylor shot a G man dead in 1839; William Roadknight shot another dead in July of that same year; whites killed another in 1840. (Clark 1995, pp. 138–139)) More often, squatters destroyed campsites and took implements as revenge. By 1839, the Gulidjan were unable to live traditionally on their lands and began to take jobs on European stations.

In 1839, the Reverend Francis Tuckfield, from the Wesleyan Mission Society, established a mission station, called Buntingdale, at Birregurra, in Gulidjan territory . Housing was only provided if tribal families renounced polygamy. Early conflicts between the Gulidjan and Wathaurong peoples at the mission persuaded the missionaries to concentrate on one language group - the Gulidjan - in 1842. Within three years the mission saw one tribe have its numbers halved, and the impact on the Colac tribe was said to be more drastic. The Gulidjan successfully resisted his attempts at cultural genocide through the indoctrination of Christian values and a sedentary lifestyle, and the mission was closed in 1848. At that point, they took refuge at Alexander Dennis's Tardwarncourt station.

Coloniser Hugh Murray, who first claimed the area in September 1837, asserted in 1853 that the local Gulidjan tribe was small, numbering between 35 and 40. (Note: "The Colac tribe of natives was not numerous when we came here – men, women and children not numbering more than 35 or 40." (Murray 1898, p. 5)) By 1850, 43 males and 35 females were counted to be alive. With the influx of people searching for gold during the 1850s Victorian gold rush, and the continuation of genocidal policies, only 19 Gulidjan were left by 1858. Causes of the decline were identified in 1862 as starvation due to European occupation of the best-grassed areas of their lands, European diseases such as chicken pox, measles and influenza, association with convicts, and heightened tribal enmity. However, it is widely acknowledged that Australian historical accounts minimise the impact of genocidal practices on Aboriginal populations, and instead emphasise causes of population decline that have only indirect associations with the behaviour of colonisers, such as disease, or that blame Aboriginal communities for their own decline, such as due to violence.

In the 1860s, a small reserve, Karngun, was established for the Gulidjan people on the Barwon River at Winchelsea, and was maintained until 1875. A house was built for them on the present Colac hospital site, but they preferred living in their traditional mia-mias. In 1872, 16 hectares of land were reserved at Elliminyt, south of Colac, for the Gulidjan, with a brick house erected on the site, but the Gulidjan preferred to use the house as a windbreak. Richard Sharp and Jim Crow, both Gulidjan people, established working leases on the site, and their families continued to hold their respective lots until 1948, when the land was sold by the Victorian Lands Department. Descendants of those families continue to live in the local area.

== Society ==
The Gulidjan are a matrilineal society who intermarried with the Djab Wurrung, Djargurd Wurrung and Wada wurrung. Each person belonged to a moiety of gabadj (Black Cockatoo) or grugidj (White Cockatoo).

At interregional corroborees, where upwards of 20 tribes each having its own language or dialect, would gather, Gulidjan was one of four languages spoken, the other three being Tjapwurrung, Kuurn Kopan Noot and Wiitya whuurong, a dialect of Wathawurrung.

=== Clans ===
Before European settlement, 4 separate clans existed

No	Clan name	Approximate location
1	Beeac Clan	Lake Beeac
2	Birregurra Clan	Birregurra
3	Guraldjin balug	'Ingleby' station, on the Barwon River
4	Gulidjan Balug	Vicinity of Lake Colac

== Alternative names ==
- Kolidjon
- Kolac-gnat??
- Kulidyan
- Lolijon
- Colijon, Koligon (g = dj): Coligan
- Loli(f)on (f is a misprint)
- Colac-conedeet (horde name)
- Karakoi, Karakoo
- Bungilearney Colagiens
- Kolakngat

== Some words ==
- purterrong (child)
- tharrong (man)
- part-part (moon)
- birri (breast)
- mama (father)

== Sources ==
- Blake, Barry; Clark, Ian D.; Reid, Julie (2001) [First published 1998]. "The Colac language". In Blake, Barry (ed.). Wathawurrung and the Colac Language of Southern Victoria (PDF). Vol. 147. Research School of Pacific and Asian Studies. pp. 155–177. ISBN 0-85883-498-7.
- Chapman, Nan (1966). Historic Homes of Western Victoria: Stories of Prominent Pioneering Families of Western Victoria and of their Stately and Gracious Homes, Today Irreplaceable Symbols of a Wilderness Tamed. Colac Herald.
- Clark, Ian D. (1995). Scars in the Landscape: a register of massacre sites in western Victoria, 1803–1859 (PDF). AIATSIS. pp. 135–139. ISBN 0-85575-281-5.
- Clark, Ian D. (2014). "Multiple Aboriginal placenames in western and central Victoria". In Clark, Ian D.; Hercus, Luise; Kostanski, Laura (eds.). Indigenous and Minority Placenames: Australian and International Perspectives. Australian National University Press. pp. 169–175. ISBN 978-0-85575-281-1. JSTOR j.ctt13www5z.16.
- Critchett, Jan (1990) [First published 1988]. A 'distant field of murder': Western District frontiers, 1834–1848. Melbourne University Press. ISBN 978-0-522-84389-7.
- Dawson, James (1881). Australian Aborigines: The Languages and Customs of Several Tribes of Aborigines in the Western District of Victoria, Australia (PDF). Melbourne: George Robertson.
- Dixon, Robert M. W. (2011). The Languages of Australia. Cambridge University Press. ISBN 978-1-108-01785-5.
- Hebb, Isaac (1970) [First published 1888]. History of Colac and District. Hawthorn Press.
- Le Griffon, Heather (2006). Campfires at the Cross: An Account of the Bunting Dale Aboriginal Mission 1839-1951 at Birregurra, Near Colac, Victoria: with a Biography of Francis Tuckfield. Australian Scholarly Publishing. ISBN 978-1-740-97112-6.
- Mitchell, Jessie (2007). "Corrupt desires and the wages of sin: indigenous people, missionaries and male sexuality, 1830–1850". In Macfarlane, Ingereth; Hannah, Mark (eds.). Transgressions: Critical Australian Indigenous Histories. Australian National University Press. pp. 229–249. ISBN 978-1-921-31343-1.
- Murray, Hugh (1898). "Letter No.2, 18 August 1853" (PDF). In Bride, Thomas Francis (ed.). Letters from Victorian Pioneers. Melbourne: Robert S Brain Government Printer. pp. 4–5.
- Tindale, Norman Barnett (1974). "Kolakngat (VIC)". Aboriginal Tribes of Australia: Their Terrain, Environmental Controls, Distribution, Limits, and Proper Names. Australian National University Press. ISBN 978-0-708-10741-6.
