= Framlingham, Victoria =

Framlingham
- Suburb
- Coordinates: 38°14′0″S 142°42′0″E
- Country: Australia
- State: Victoria
- City: Warrnambool
- LGA: Shire of Moyne
- Location: 233 km (145 mi) SW of Melbourne; 12 km (7.5 mi) E of Panmure; 18 km (11 mi) W of Terang

Government
  - State electorate: Polwarth
  - Federal division: Wannon

Population
  - Total: 158 (2016)
- Postcode: 3265

Framlingham is a locality situated by the Hopkins River in the Western District of Victoria, Australia, about 20 kilometres (12 mi) north-east of the coastal city of Warrnambool. In the 2016 census, the township had a population of 158.

The town lies within the traditional lands of the Girai wurrung (Kirrae Wuurong) people. In the decades following European settlement in the 1840s, a general store, post office, hotel, school and Presbyterian church were established in Framlingham, as increasing numbers of graziers and dairy farmers settled the area. The Framlingham Aboriginal Reserve was established by the Board for the Protection of Aborigines between Purnim and the township of Framlingham in 1861, upon the request of an Anglican mission. It was located beside the Hopkins River, not far from the boundary with the Gunditjmara people. After various attempts at closure, the reserve operated until 1916, albeit with the land reduced in size. Much of the Aboriginal community continued to live there until the present time. Some of the land that was originally part of the reserve became Framlingham Forest, which is now part of the Framlingham Forest Indigenous Protected Area (IPA).

== History ==
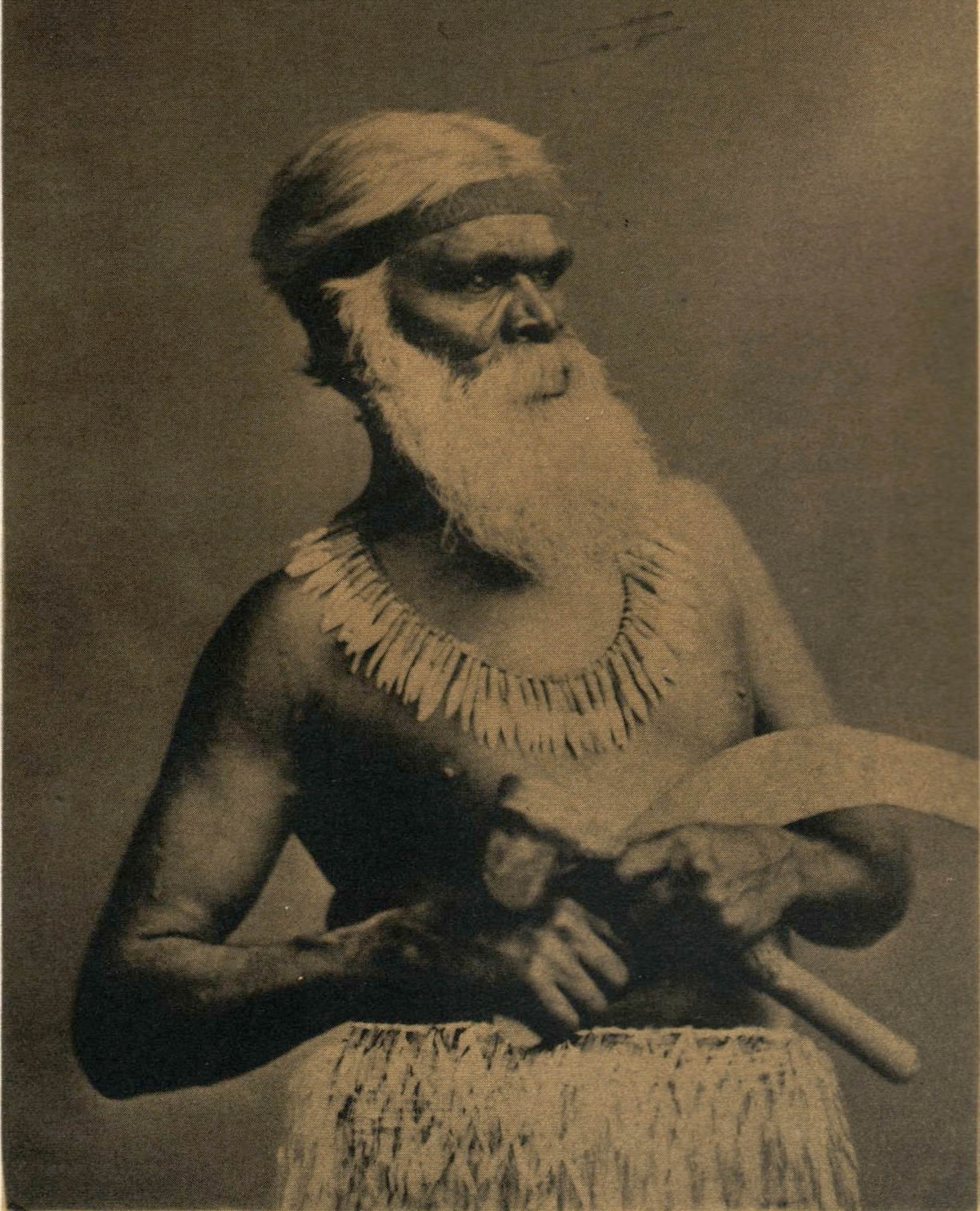
Kaawirn Kuunawarn (Hissing Swan), also known as King David, Chief of the Kirrae Wuurong, who lived in Framlingham from 1865 until his death in 1889.

=== 1840s: White settlement ===
European settlement began around 1840, the village beginning with the establishment of the Brefnay Hotel in about 1848. A store opened within the next decade, and a Presbyterian church in 1870. A great deal of land was cleared of trees to establish dairy farms and other forms of agriculture.

=== 1861: Aboriginal reserve established ===
The Church of England in Warrnambool obtained 1,416 hectares (3,500 acres) of land for an Aboriginal mission station to "ameliorate the present wretched conditions of the Aborigines", and requested establishment of an Aboriginal reserve in the area. The Victorian Board for the Protection of Aborigines created Framlingham Aboriginal Reserve in response. The reserve was occupied in 1865 by many of the surviving members of the Kirrae Wuurong clans, who originally inhabited the area between Mount Emu Creek and the Hopkins River, and much of whose language was recorded by a Scottish squatter, James Dawson. Members of the Djargurd Wurrung from the Camperdown area and Gunditjmara people from Warrnambool were also relocated to Framlingham, but Gunditjmara from Portland and Lake Condah refused to settle here due to tension with the other clans, leading to the establishment of the Lake Condah reserve in 1869. The Aboriginal Australian leader Collin Hood lived here with his wife Nora Hood beginning in 1865.

In 1867 the reserve was closed by the Central Board appointed by the Government of Victoria and attempts were made to relocate the residents to Lake Condah Mission but in September 1868 the Kirrae Wuurong won the re-establishment of the reserve. Residents of Warrnambool campaigned from 1877 to 1890 to close the reserve and turn it into an experimental agricultural farm, and in 1894 the reserve was reduced to 222 hectares (2.22 km^{2}) and the majority of the land given to the Council of Agricultural Education. However, the agricultural farm plans never eventuated, with this land becoming the Framlingham Forest. In 1889 the Board attempted to close the reserve again, but it finally agreed to reserve 500 acres (200 ha)} for Aboriginal use.

In 1916 the Government of Victoria decided to concentrate Aboriginal Victorians at Lake Tyers Mission in Gippsland. The reserve was eventually closed but some residents were allowed to remain, with the community being granted ownership in 1971 of the 237 hectares (2.37 km^{2}) they held at that time. In the 1930s, public concern over the conditions led the government to build extra housing and a school, and to provide rations.

When the reserve was established, it was declared to be 3,500 acres (14 km^{2}) in area, although its actual size may have been closer to 4,400 acres (18 km^{2}). As parts of the reserve were sold to private landowners, its size diminished, until only the 586 acres (2.37 km^{2}) remained when it was closed in 1971. Some of this land was also set aside as a State Forest.

=== 1970-1987: Land rights ===
In 1957 the Board for the Protection of Aborigines was abolished, and in 1970 the Aboriginal Lands Act 1970 was passed by the Parliament of Victoria. Under the provisions of that Act, ownership of Framlingham was handed over to a trust held by Aboriginal residents of the site, Framlingham Aboriginal Trust, on 1 July 1971. Along with Lake Tyers, in the eastern Gippsland region of the state, Framlingham was the last reserve to close in Victoria.

In 1976 the Framlingham community began a campaign to regain rights to the Framlingham Forest, that had been excised from the original 1861 reserve in 1894. In April 1979 the community blockaded the road to the forest picnic ground. The Victorian Government proposed allowing Aboriginal management of the forest in 1980 but maintained that it would continue as crown land. The proposal was rejected by the community, who resumed the blockade.

In 1987, the Victorian Labor government under John Cain attempted to grant some of the Framlingham State Forest to the trust as inalienable title, but the legislation was blocked by the Liberal Party opposition in the Legislative Council. However, the federal Labor government under Bob Hawke intervened, passing the Aboriginal Land (Lake Condah and Framlingham Forest) Act 1987, which gave 1,130 acres (4.6 km^{2}) of the Framlingham forest to the Framlingham trust. Although the title is essentially inalienable, in that it can only be transferred to another Indigenous land trust, the Framlingham trust has no rights to prevent mining on the land, unlike trusts or communities holding native title. The Kirrae Whurrong Aboriginal Corporation was established under the Aboriginal Lands Act 1970 to hold in trust "the land of the Framlingham Forest and Reserve returned to the Aboriginal community".

=== 1983: Ash Wednesday ===
On 16 February 1983, one of the Ash Wednesday fires started here and swept through the district killing nine people, destroying many homes, farm buildings and livestock. The cause was believed to be poorly maintained power lines.

=== 2009: Framlingham Forest IPA ===
In 2009, an Indigenous Protected Area was dedicated, known as the Framlingham Forest IPA, covering 1,130 hectares (2,800 acres) of native forests. It is the largest remnant of native forest containing the stringybark and manna gum savannah in the area. The Framlingham Aboriginal Trust manages the land.

== Traditional ownership ==
The formally recognised traditional owners for the area in which Framlingham sits are groups within the Eastern Maar peoples, who are represented by the Eastern Maar Aboriginal Corporation (EMAC).

== Post offices ==
Framlingham post office nearby opened on 1 March 1859 and closed in 1975. A Framlingham East post office was also open from 1925 until 1945.

== Description ==
In the 2016 census, the township had a population of 158.

The town has a hall and a public reserve with tennis court and barbecue facilities. The fire station was opened in 2015. The school, established in 1872, was closed in 1993.

== Notable citizens ==
- Archie Roach, iconic singer, songwriter and musician, resided in Framlingham in his early years before forced removal of Roach and his siblings by government agencies, as described in his 1990 debut single, 'Took the Children Away'
- Reg Saunders, famous Aboriginal soldier, born in Framlingham in 1920
- Paul McGinness, founder of Qantas, born in Framlingham in 1896
- Jamarra Ugle-Hagan, AFL football player for the Western Bulldogs, number 1 national draft pick for 2020 AFL draft

== See also ==
- Girai Wurrung
- Gunditjmara
- Royal Commission on the Aborigines (1877)
