= Murdering Gully massacre =

Massacre in Victoria, Australia

Coordinates: 38°15′05″S 142°58′04″E

Date	mid-1839
Location	Gully on Mount Emu Creek, Strathdownie station later Glenormiston Station, where a small stream adjoins from Merida Station, near Camperdown
Result	European victory, a massacre

Belligerents
Frederick Taylor, James Hamilton, Broomfield and employees	Tarnbeere Gundidj clan of the Djargurd Wurrung

Commanders and leaders
Frederick Taylor	Unknown

Strength
about 10	52

Casualties and losses
None	35 to 40 killed

Murdering Gully, formerly known as Puuroyup to the Djargurd Wurrung people, is the site of an 1839 massacre of 35–40 people of the Tarnbeere Gundidj clan of the Djargurd Wurrung in the Camperdown district of Victoria, Australia. It is a gully on Mount Emu Creek, where a small stream adjoins from Merida Station.

Of particular note for this massacre is the extent of oral history, and first hand accounts of the incident and detail in settler diaries, records of Wesleyan missionaries, and Aboriginal Protectorate records. Following the massacre there was popular disapproval and censure of the leading perpetrator, Frederick Taylor, so that Taylor's River was renamed Mount Emu Creek. The massacre effectively destroyed the Tarnbeere Gundidj clan.

== Cause ==
The massacre was undertaken by Frederick Taylor and others in retaliation for some sheep being killed by two unidentified Aboriginal people, as reported by one of Taylor's shepherds. As Aboriginal clans were pushed from their lands, their traditional food of kangaroo and emu became scarce, forcing them to kill sheep to fend off starvation. A common resistance tactic against the European invasion and dispossession was an economic war to drive sheep off and to kill sheep for food. However, George Robinson, the Chief Protector of Aborigines, in a letter to Assistant Protector Charles Sievwright on 11 July 1839, questions Taylor's allegation saying:

What proof is there of the Blacks having killed the sheep? The shepherd said so. Might not the shepherd have done it himself and after keeping the hindquarters for his own use have given the forequarters to the natives ... If this is the only charge Mr Taylor can allege against the aboriginal natives it certainly amounts to very little. In point of law it proved it is an offence, but who in the name of common humanity I would ask would think of injuring those already too much injured people, and for such a trifle.

== Massacre ==
Frederick Taylor, the manager at Glenormiston station, with associates James Hamilton and Bloomfield led a group of several shepherds in their employ and attacked a sleeping Aboriginal camp, firing upon and killing men, women and children. The bodies were dumped in the waterhole and later burnt, according to some accounts. Several Aboriginal people were able to escape and later told their accounts to Assistant Protector Sievwright, and Wesleyan missionaries Benjamin Hurst and Francis Tuckfield.

Taylor had formerly been implicated in the killing of Woolmudgin from the Wathaurong people on 17 October 1836, and had fled to Van Diemen's Land to avoid interview and possible prosecution in that case.

In a deposition by Edward Williamson, overseer to the Wesleyan Buntingdale Mission establishment at Birregurra, outlines the events of the massacre as reported to him by Wore-gu-i-moni:

...The party advanced in an extended line upon the natives, Mr Taylor was in the centre of the line, the shepherds were on each side of him, they advanced shouting and immediately fired upon the natives who were asleep. They succeeded in killing all they could see, amounting to thirty five (35). I was particular in ascertaining the exact number and they (the natives) gave me the same number over and over again. The slaughtered consisted of men, women and children. The above named native was one of the party attacked and succeeded in hiding himself among the long grass and thus escaped. The whites immediately threw the bodies into a waterhole, and left the spot leaving the bodies there.

Charles Sievwright collected another witness statement from Wan-geg-a-mon relating to the murder of his wife and child in the massacre:

...about six moons ago, I with my lubra and child (male) were encamped with thirty others Aboriginal natives, men, women and children, upon the Bor-rang-yallock, when Mr Taylor and many poor men (shepherds) came towards our miam-miams with guns, Mr Taylor was on horseback, they came up in an extended line Mr Taylor in the centre they advanced quick and immediately fired upon the natives, I ran to the other side of the river and lay down behind a tree among the grass, they killed more than thirty men women and children, my lubra and child were among the dead, the white people threw them into the water and soon left the place, the water was much stained with blood, I saw the dead body of my lubra but did not see my child. I remained for two days near the spot. Two days after the murder Yi-yi-ran (Mr Andreson) and Mr Watson came and saw the bodies and seemed sorry and said to Mr Taylor why did you kill so many lubras and children. Yi-yi-ran, Charles Courtney, James Ramslie and James Hamilton, burned the bodies, and made fires. Mr Taylor, Mr Andreson and Mr Watson came on horseback two days after with a sack and took away part of the bones not consumed.

Oral history collected by James Dawson in 1881, told of Bareetch Chuurneen (alias Queen Fanny the chieftess of the clan) escaping with a child. She was pursued to Wuurna Weewheetch on the west side of Lake Bullen Merri. With the child on her back she swam across the lake to finally escape her pursuers.

== Aftermath ==
Glenormiston station was purchased by Niel Black in 1840, who wrote in his journal:

The blacks have been very troublesome on it [Glenormiston] and I believe they have been cruelly dealt with. The late superintendent [Taylor] ran off from a fear that he would be apprehended and tried for murdering the natives. The poor creatures are terror stricken and will be easily managed. ... It is the opinion of Blackie [the station overseer] that about 35 – 40 natives have been despatched on this establishment and that there is only two men left alive of the tribe. He is certain we will never be troubled with any of them on this run.

Black maintained the dispossession and native terror engendered by the massacre by driving Djargurd Wurrung people from his run, pulling down any bark shelters he found and leaving gunpowder to show as a warning sign.

Taylor, fearing prosecution for the massacre, in late 1839 or early 1840 fled to the obscurity of India for a few years. He returned to Victoria and in June 1844 was managing a station on the Mitchell River near Lindenow. When Taylor applied to take up his own run in Gippsland, the Commissioner of Crown Lands, Charles Tyers, refused to grant any land citing Taylor's treatment of Aborigine people in the Western District. Taylor appealed to Governor Charles La Trobe requesting:

a copy of these grave charges that are recorded against me that I may have an opportunity of showing Mr Tyers and the Government that I am innocent of any improper treatment of the aboriginal natives of this district.

La Trobe reviewed the case over subsequent months, including the evidence collected by Charles Sievwright and forwarded by Chief Protector of Aborigines George Robinson, and upheld Tyer's decision. Despite this decision Taylor became a joint licence holder of Lindenow with the Loughnans in 1845. In March 1846 La Trobe informed the Colonial Secretary that all charges against Taylor had "ended in satisfactory disproval".

For the next 13 years Taylor continued to hold licences for land in Gippsland along the Mitchell and Tambo rivers, around Lake Victoria and Lake King, and at Swan Reach, where he continued with a campaign of dispossession of the Gunai people.

== See also ==
- List of massacres in Australia
- List of massacres of Indigenous Australians
