= GJM =

GJM or gjm may refer to:

- Gorkha Janmukti Morcha, a registered unrecognized political party in Gorkhaland, India
- gjm, the ISO 639-3 code for Gunditjmara language, Victoria, Australia
