= Camperdown Post Office =

- Location within Victoria
- 38.2317°S 143.1465°E
- Location: 190 Manifold Street, Camperdown, Victoria, Australia

History
- Built: 1863 with alterations in 1880s and 1909

Site notes
- Architect(s): John James Clark (1863 original); John Hudson Marsden (1880s alterations); Horace John Mackennal (1909 additions, attributed)

Commonwealth Heritage List
- Official name: Camperdown Post Office
- Type: Listed place (Historic)
- Designated: 8 November 2011
- Reference no.: 106130

Camperdown Post Office is a heritage-listed post office at 190 Manifold Street, Camperdown, Victoria, Australia. It was initially designed by John James Clark and built by Richard Pimblett in 1863. Alterations in 1880, 1882 and 1887 were designed by John Hudson Marsden and built by McCrae & Fullarton. Further 1909 alterations were possibly designed by Horace Mackennal under the aegis of John Smith Murdoch and were built by Alex J. Laurie. It was added to the Australian Commonwealth Heritage List on 8 November 2011.

== History ==
The first post office was established at the Lake Timboon settlement, north of the present site of Camperdown, in 1849. By 1853, when the new settlement at Mount Leura had been established, colonist John Wells carried out postal business from his premises in Camperdown. By 1856 a Post Office Savings Bank had been opened in Camperdown.

The construction of Camperdown Post and Telegraph Office in 1863 was prompted by the arrival of the telegraph line the previous year and resulted in the replacement of the earlier structure on the site. The design was originally prepared for a brick post office building at Rutherglen by John James Clark for the Public Works Department the same year (since demolished). The new post office was a single-storey building, constructed from locally quarried basalt by local builder, Richard Pimblett, at a cost of £1594. It underwent unknown repairs in 1866.

Due to the inadequacy of the building, various additions and alterations were undertaken by builders McCrae & Fullarton in 1880, 1882 and 1887, designed by PWD architect John Hudson Marsden who also designed the Old Geelong Post Office (1889–91). The 1880 repairs, additions and alterations included construction of a new telegraph writing and dispatching room by incorporating former writing room into main telegraph office, and the relocation of letter and newspaper boxes to each side of the delivery window. The 1882 additions and alterations included a new entrance from Church Street and a new room created within the existing verandah recess on Church Street, while the building underwent further repairs and painting in 1887. The 1888 works included stone additions, presumably frontal additions at southeast corner of building comprising the demolition of existing verandah and porch and construction of a new public lobby, a large post office, and receivers and paymaster room for telegraph office, as well as a new delivery window between the new lobby and post office. Further repairs and painting took place in 1890 and 1894. The stonework was removed from the delivery window to create an arch and open counter to the lobby in 1901–02. A new doorway between the original kitchen and bedroom and the construction of rear kitchen wing including kitchen, pantry, lobby and underground also took place prior to 1909.

During the early 1900s a number of public meetings were held to discuss further alterations to the post office, with the Camperdown Chronicle describing the building as "a depressing spectacle and a sorry sort of housing for what may be termed the nerve centre of the commercial life of the district – the whole thing is unsightly, unhealthy and inadequate". As a result, an inquiry and report were undertaken by the Post Master and Inspector General of Works who ordered extensive additions and alterations. The Federal Public Works Department set aside £1600 for the transformation of the post office, and these works began in 1908 by builder Alex J Laurie, expanding the availability of postal and telegraph facilities. The 1909 works included extensive additions and alterations generally along the southern and eastern sides of the building, including demolition of the majority of the 1880s additions (with the exception of the projecting bay to Church Street); construction of a double-height corner bay for the public space and counter area with mail room behind; arcaded verandah to new post office facing Church Street; addition at southwest corner of building to enlarge private sitting room; construction of new verandah to protect new private entrance from Manifold Street (conversion of original window to door); rear kitchen wing added to provide new pantry and bathroom. By the completion of the additions, the original bluestone dressings had been overpainted to match the new detailing.

The construction of a second-storey addition over the northeast corner of the building c. 1940 involved installation of internal stair in the former rear lobby. Works at that time included demolition of former kitchen wing and construction of toilet at northwest corner of former residence and a bicycle shed constructed in the western side yard.

In c. 1960s, a steel-framed fire escape stair was constructed on northern side of building and the 1909 mail room windows were altered to provide a delivery door; a red brick store and amenities building was constructed to the north of the post office building; the original moulded "telegraph Office" signage over the southern lunette window was replaced with wrought iron "Camperdown" signage; the picket fence was removed; the southern verandah floor was replaced with concrete; the window at northeast corner of mail room converted to door; the post office box room was created in part of the mail room which included installation of door in northern wall; and an acoustic tile ceiling was installed in the public space. A new automated telephone exchange opened on an adjoining site to the north in 1968.

In c. 1990s, Australia Post livery was updated including new signage; the door at northeast corner of mail room converted to window; a cast iron pillarbox installed in front of entrance; additional noticeboards were installed in front verandah; a non-original door in north wall of post office box room infilled with bluestone; conservation works on bluestone including repointing; the post office counter was relocated further north increasing retail shop floor area; general interior refurbishment was undertaken; downpipes and guttering renewed; two public telephone booths installed in northeast corner of site; and Cyclone wire fence constructed across southern boundary.

== Description ==
Camperdown Post Office is at 190 Manifold Street, Camperdown, comprising the whole of Lot 2 LP219632.

The irregularly-shaped cranked site is a prominent location in the centre of the main commercial and retail precinct, directly opposite Camperdown's landmark clock tower. Vehicular access to the concreted rear yard is via gates on Church Street, flanked to the north by a non-original brick store and to the south by the post office. At the western end of the driveway is a free-standing timber-framed bicycle shed and the site area to the west of the main building provides a landscaped outlook to the former quarters.

The original single-storey bluestone building was constructed on an L-shaped plan to address both Manifold and Church streets, however, the majority of the principal south and east elevations have been ensconced by the 1880s and 1909 additions. As such, the Camperdown Post Office is effectively an asymmetrical conglomeration of pavilions and bays of various forms, united by the common use of rock-faced bluestone. The 1860s building is apparent behind the Manifold Street verandah in the form of a pair of round-arched windows (though the former gable end was replaced with a bellcast roof form extending over the verandah). With the exception of the southernmost bay, the western elevation is unchanged from its original form and fabric, presenting as a domestically scaled quarters wing. The eastern Church Street elevation is distinguished by a gable-ended projecting wing, dating from the 1880s with coupled round-arched windows and diamond gable vent.

The 1909 work effectively deepened the floor plan in both directions to the street and superimposed a Federation Freestyle character to the Victorian building. The southeast corner of the building is double-height in form, marking the entrance and main public space. This element is distinguished by a tripartite lunette with multi-paned timber-framed sashes set within a moulded timber aedicule and rendered arch and bays of fenestration at highlight level, also with multi-paned sashes. The building is accessed via a segmental arched arcade to the street terminated by a corner entrance porch with "ox bow" motif to the pediment and ashlar pilasters surmounted by ball finials. The northern end of the verandah provides access to the 1880s telegraph office, since converted to a post office box room.

The northeast corner of the building is marked by a large second-floor addition dating from the 1940s. The structure continues the general architectural language and detail of the building, albeit in a simplified manner.

Internally, the planning now reflects four distinct zones within the building being the public space and post office, flanked on two sides by the mail room and offices. This is distinct from the former quarters wing along the western side of the building and the later first-floor meeting room.

=== Condition and integrity ===
Externally, the Camperdown Post Office presents an amalgam of various periods of development, the most dramatic of which culminated in the extensive reworking of the original building in 1909. While this was again altered in 1940, the 1909 form, conception, materials and detail is remarkably clear, despite the efforts to blend with the original. In this regard, the building is far from externally intact to its 1863 form, yet the ongoing alterations reflect the development of postal and telegraph requirements of a prosperous district. The building appears to be very well maintained and the exterior condition is good by virtue of apparent conservation works to the stonework and regular painting and roof works.

While the original design intent is largely legible throughout the residential wing of the building, collective alterations and additions have almost completely obscured the 1863 post and telegraph office planning. Saying this, the current internal form demonstrates clearly the 1909 planning and reworking of the building. The integrity of the original fabric and details has been diminished in most cases by cumulative and extensive refurbishment of finishes. The condition of the disused first floor API room is poor.

== Heritage listing ==
The Camperdown Post Office, constructed in 1863 and with major works of 1909, is significant as one of the oldest remaining established postal and telecommunications buildings within Victoria. Its construction parallels the establishment of the telegraph line to Camperdown in late 1862, itself a result of a rapidly increasing local population and influential district. The incorporation of post and telegraph facilities into the one building at Camperdown preceded a significant phase in post office design which was heralded by the amalgamation of the previously separate departments in 1870. The alterations and additions, particularly in 1909, reflect the increasing postal and telegraph needs of the affluent and developing district. The post office is also one of the earliest public buildings in Camperdown, being erected within ten years of settlement in response to the rapid development of the district from 1853. It is located within the principal public and commercial buildings precinct in the township and with its neighbours and memorial elements such as those in the flanking Clocktower precinct, demonstrates the early and ongoing prosperity of the area.

Camperdown Post Office is an uncommon example of a Federation-era Freestyle Arts and Crafts grafting and reworking of a mid-Victorian Italianate public building, with a high degree of external intactness from these key periods. Camperdown Post Office is also a rare surviving example from a very small group of post offices with quarters constructed during the early 1860s in Victoria which has remained in continuous postal operation. It is further distinguished by the comparatively early, and uncommon, integration of telegraph facilities within the same building. Stylistically, the reworked building is an unusual and distinctive graft of Victorian Italianate and Federation Free Style examples, further distinguished by the atypical use of bluestone rather than brick.

Centrally located on a prominent intersection in Manifold Street the distinctive post office building is a landmark element within the main government and commercial precinct of Camperdown, and makes a major contribution to the historic streetscape and flanking Clocktower precinct. Camperdown Post Office is an excellent small scale, albeit amalgam, of the stonemason's craftsmanship. The application of bluestone as a valued construction material for the subsequent phases of development of the building gives unity to the otherwise eclectic composition. Camperdown Post Office has had a very long and strong association with the community which it has served for 144 years. It has an enduring quality as a prominent component of the town's historic streetscape.

The curtilage includes the title block/allotment of the property.

The significant components of Camperdown Post Office include the evolved post office building and former quarters wing comprising fabric dating from 1863 through 1909. The second storey addition over the north-east corner of the building, constructed in c. 1940, is complementary to the original building and is of contributory significance.
