= Frederick Taylor (colonist) =

Frederick Taylor (25 December 1810 - 14 February 1872) was an English mass murderer, colonial property manager and agricultural capitalist in the Victoria region of Australia. He is best known as the main perpetrator of the Murdering Gully massacre which occurred in 1839 along Mount Emu Creek near Mount Noorat. This massacre resulted in the deaths of about 40 men, women and children of the Tarnbeere gundidj clan of the Djargurd Wurrung people. Taylor was also involved in other shooting deaths of Aboriginal people near Geelong and Lake Colac. After moving to Gippsland, he was involved in the frontier conflict there with the Gunai people. Despite his responsibility for the killings being well known and well documented, Taylor was never convicted and enjoyed high esteem in British colonial society until his death in 1872.

== Early years and Arrival in Australia ==
Frederick Taylor was born on 25 December 1810 in England. He came to the Port Phillip region in Australia in March 1836 and not long after was overseer at Charles Swanston's Indented Head station. He seems to have had strong connections with notable British people in India such as Captain Swanston and George McKillop.

== Murder of Woolmudgin ==
In October 1836, a head clansman of the Wathaurung named Woolmudgin (or Curacoine) came to Indented Head. Taylor mistakenly identified Woolmudgin as a person wanted for an armed attack. He tied Woolmudgin to a tree and placed a shepherd named John Whitehead as sentry while he went to notify the authorities. Whitehead later shot Woolmudgin and dumped his body in the Barwon River. Whitehead was arrested and Taylor was placed on a £50 bond as a witness. At the subsequent trial, Taylor failed to appear and Whitehead was acquitted. Captain William Lonsdale wrote that he thought Taylor "entertained a strong suspicion that he had given strong encouragement to the prisoner [Whitehead] to commit the murder". Taylor then avoided any further legal scrutiny by fleeing to Van Diemen's Land.

== Lake Colac shooting ==
Frederick Taylor returned to the mainland in 1839 and appeared to have briefly been a licensed squatter in the Port Fairy region. There is a record of Taylor in association with another man named Arthur Lloyd shooting an Aboriginal man dead at Lake Colac in 1839.

== Murdering Gully Massacre ==
Also in 1839, Taylor was appointed manager of George McKillop's and James Smith's Strathdownie station. In that year, having heard of an encampment of Tarnbeere gundidj and other people at a place called Puuroyuup within the station, Taylor went out to remove and punish them. While the Djargurd Wurrung people were asleep, Taylor with the aid of a number of shepherds and workers on horseback, formed a cordon around them and then fired at them indiscriminately. Somewhere between 35 and 40 men, women and children were killed. The bodies were thrown into waterholes, but were later removed and burnt due to survivors bringing attention to the scene by endeavouring to recover the corpses of their relatives from the waterholes.

Some of the survivors included Larkikok, Woreguimoni, Karn, Benadug and Bareetch Chuurneen. Many of these people went to the nearby Buntingdale Wesleyan mission to seek refuge and report the crime. With interest from authorities mounting, Taylor again fled the colony, this time absconding onto an American whaling vessel that was moored in Portland Bay and sailing to India. Taylor was tried in absentia by Crown Prosecutor James Croke and although Taylor's role was of a "very suspicious nature" he was acquitted due to evidence from Aboriginal people being inadmissible.

The massacre occurred on Taylor's Creek which was named after Frederick Taylor. It is notable that due to the killings, the creek was renamed Mount Emu Creek and the station itself was given a new title in 1840 of Glenormiston by its new owner Niel Black.

== South Asia ==
Taylor spent the next few years in India and Ceylon, consolidating with contacts in the British Army and East India Company with a view to return to Australia and set up new squatting interests. These people were Richard Sterling Jones, John Davison Smith, John Michael Loughnan and Henry Nicholas Loughnan. The Loughnans became particularly close to Taylor. J.M. Loughnan was a Captain in the 10th Bengal Cavalry, Fort Adjutant at Fort William in Calcutta and aide-de-camp to Governor General Lord Auckland. After attaining enough influence and organisation, Taylor prepared to return to Australia, choosing the newly occupied Gippsland region to establish himself as a squatter.

== Gippsland ==
In early 1842, Taylor arrived in the Monaro region of New South Wales with Richard Sterling Jones, William O'Dell Raymond and H.N. Loughnan with their flocks of sheep ready to overland into plains of Gippsland. Later that year they had established stations on Gunai land near modern-day Bairnsdale with Indian derived names such as Lindenow and Lucknow. Over the next fifteen years, Taylor was either overseer or license holder of a number of pastoral stations in that region including Deighton, Emu Vale, Swan Reach, Avon/Molly Plains and Lindenow. He was also assignee of Glencoe station. There were a number of massacres of Gunai people in this time period that involved groups of settlers shooting down Gunai people, but it is not clear if Frederick Taylor was directly associated. There are three incidents though where Gunai people took revenge on shepherds employed by Taylor.

The first was in 1842, where a shepherd was killed on Taylor's Lindenow station; the second was in 1844 were two shepherds were killed on the same property; and the third was in 1847 on the Deighton holding where Gunai people were rushing the shepherds' huts. The first two occurred when there was minimal police presence in the region and therefore it was up to the squatters to enforce control. Records of punishment given out by Taylor are absent but given his background it is unlikely that punitive missions were not organised. The third incident was marked by Sergeant McLelland of the Native Police being called out to the station. On his return to the Green Hills police barracks near Boisdale he dispersed "20 blacks away".

While in Gippsland, Taylor also advocated for the importation of coolie labour from India. In 1844 he endeavoured to bring some Indian coolie labourers over the Snowy Mountains and into Gippsland. They deserted en masse however due to Taylor treating them harshly. Taylor's reputation was again catching up with him, as the local Crown Commissioner, Captain Tyers, banned him from holding a pastoral license in 1844. However, due to pressure from his patrons in the Loughnan brothers, Taylor's ban was overturned in 1846.

From this point on, Frederick Taylor no longer received any trouble from his past. In fact, to all intents and purposes, he became a successful and respected colonist. He became rich trading cattle and other livestock products out of Port Albert, wrote letters petitioning the Superintendent and advised other squatters on sheep washing innovations.

== Castlemaine ==
By the mid 1850s, Taylor gradually removed his interests from Gippsland to the Mount Alexander goldfields area around modern day Castlemaine. Taylor's Paddock near Yapeen is named after him. His reputation in British colonial society apparently being so clean by this stage that he actually became a magistrate at Strathloddon and appeared as an expert witness at Legislative Council enquiries into mining and port related investigations. In 1858, Taylor was able to subdivide and sell much of his property around Castlemaine to gold miners.

== Elsternwick ==
In 1864, Frederick Taylor finally sold out of all his pastoral interests and moved to Melbourne. He dissolved his association with the Loughnans and was paid out an astonishing amount of £22,361. In 1868 he bought the prestigious Alfred Louis Smith designed Bonally house and acreage in Elsternwick. This property was five acres fronting onto Port Phillip with an exquisite ornamental garden. The house still exists as the Bonleigh residence on Bonleigh Avenue in Brighton and was recently valued at $6.5 million.

== Death and legacy ==
Taylor died on 14 January 1872 at the Bonally mansion. His obituary claims he was "an old and respected colonist". Taylor's total asset worth at his demise was £23,105. He never married and did not have an heir. In his will he left Bonally to his associate H.N. Loughnan, who moved into the residence and lived there until 1877. Frederick Taylor is buried at St Kilda cemetery with an impressive headstone.
