= Mount Leura =

Mountain in Victoria, Australia

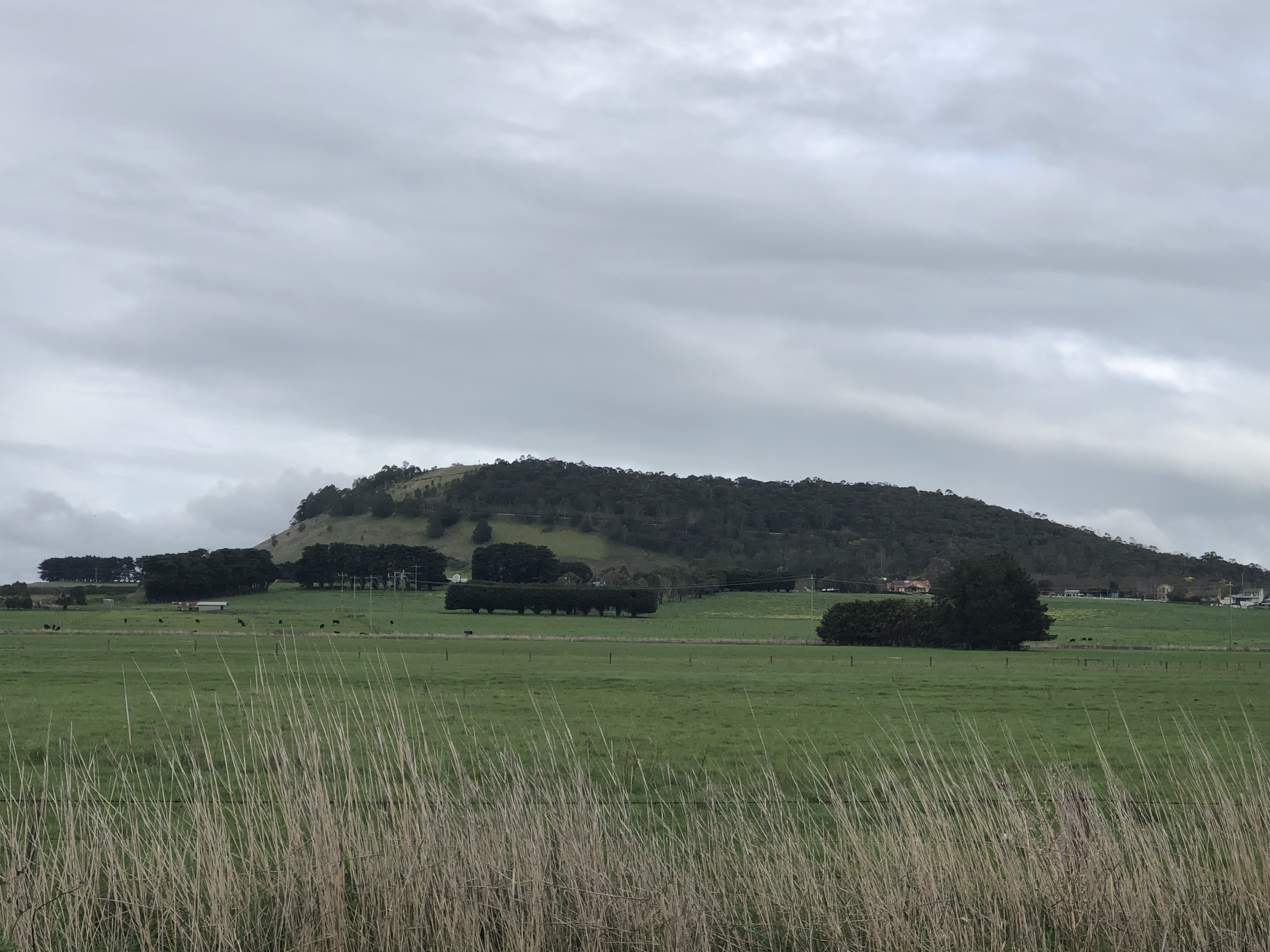
- Mount Leura, viewed from Wiridgil Road

Highest point
- Prominence: 130 m (430 ft)
- Coordinates: 38°14′44″S 143°09′29″E

Geography
- Location within Victoria
- Location: Camperdown

Geology
- Volcanic field: Newer Volcanics Province
- Last eruption: Between 5000 and 20,000 years ago

Mount Leura is a 313-metre scoria cone surrounding a dry crater 100 m deep and is the central and most obvious component of a larger volcanic complex southeast of the town of Camperdown located in western Victoria, Australia, 194 kilometres (121 mi) south west of the state capital, Melbourne. The inactive volcano is thought to have last erupted between 5,000 and 20,000 years ago. The name means "big nose" in the local Aboriginal dialect.

== Leura Maar ==
Mount Leura, together with nearby Mount Sugarloaf, forms part of a large extinct volcanic complex known as the "Leura Maar". The complex includes a broad shallow maar crater measuring 2.5 km by 1.7 km surrounded by a low tuff ring, inside which are the secondary eruption points of Mount Leura and several smaller unnamed mounds and cones of scoria. These may represent eruptions along a north–south fissure. The walls of the cone are alternating layers of tuff and scoria with numerous blocks and volcanic bombs. Mount Sugarloaf is a perfect conical mound on the southwestern flank of Mount Leura and represents a final stage of activity of the Leura volcano, when a small vent ejected a large volume of lava fragments in a short time, without a change in the direction of the eruption column. This produced a steep, symmetrical, conical mound of volcanic ash, scoria and larger blocks and bombs.

== Mining ==
Numerous quarries operated within the "Leura Maar". Quarries also provide significant exposures of bedding in tuff and scoria and many xenoliths are obtained from these. The scoria at Mount Leura is notable for the inclusions of high temperature megacrusts and xenoliths (fragments of the lower crust and mantle of the earth) which occur here in unusually high concentrations. Most of the quarries now are closed and some are used for dumping landfill.

== Tourism ==
The volcano lies within the "Lakes and Craters" region, an access road was built in 1932. It allows vehicles the size of buses to access the lookout on top of Mount Leura. On a clear day you can see the Grampians and Mount Buninyong to the north, Mount Porndon to the east and Lavers Hill to the south. To the immediate west are the deep volcanic crater lakes Bullen-Merri and Gnotuk while to the east is the crater Lake Purrumbete popular for its trout and Chinook salmon fishing.

== Hillclimb ==
Mount Leura has hosted the Australian Hillclimb Championship twice, 1985 and 1997. The access road to the summit is closed for the competition. The Australian Hillclimb Championship has been sanctioned by the Confederation of Australian Motor Sport since 1954. Prior to this it was sanctioned by the Australian Automobile Association, with two events having national championship status in 1949.

== See also ==
- List of mountains in Australia § Victoria
- List of volcanoes in Australia
