= St Paul's Anglican Church, Camperdown =

Anglican church in Camperdown, Victoria, Australia

- St Paul's Church of England Church
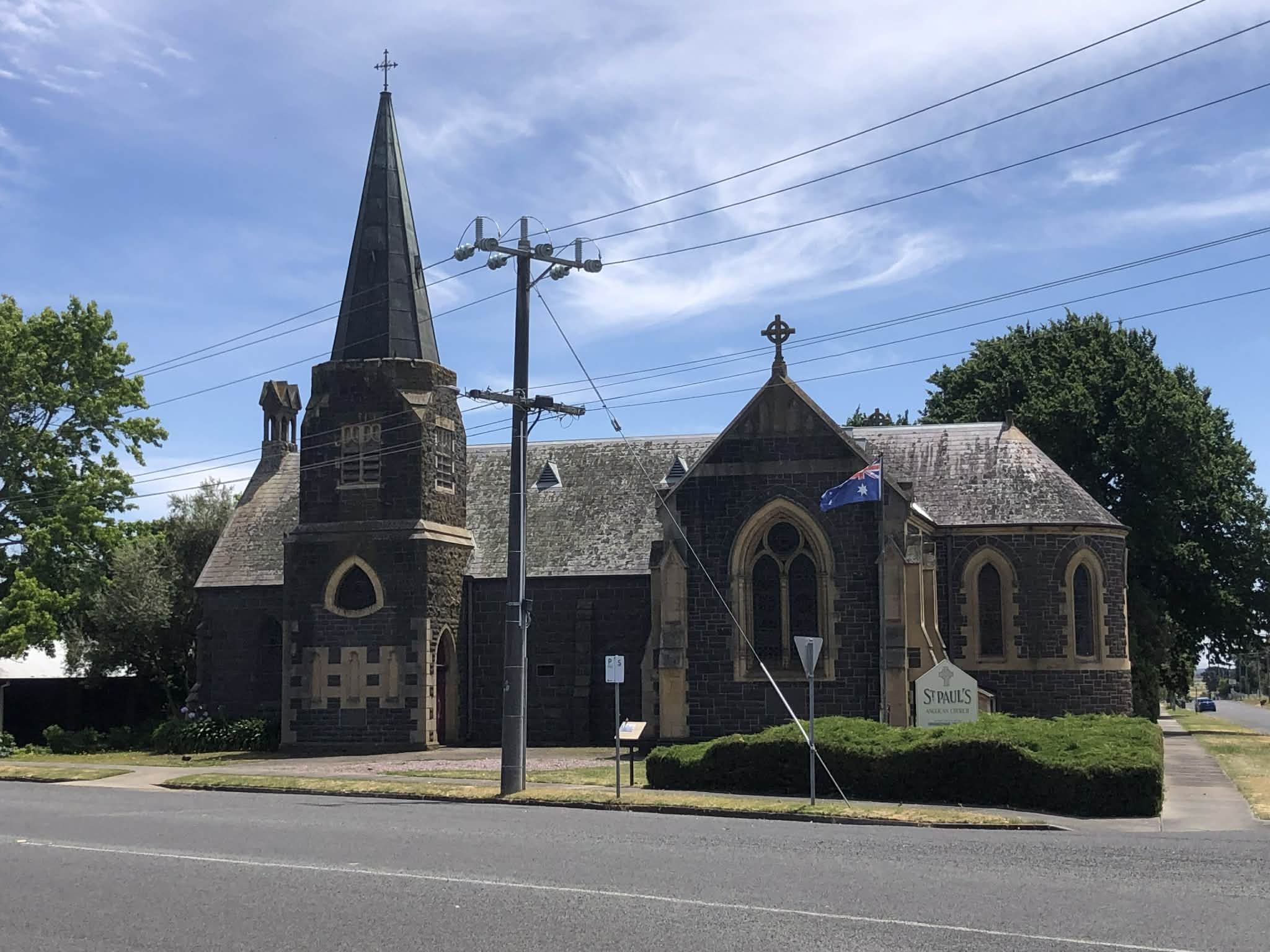
- St Paul's Anglican Church, January 2026
- St Paul's Anglican Church, Camperdown
- 38°13′49″S 143°08′48″E
- Location: Corner of Church and Fergusson Streets, Camperdown, Victoria
- Country: Australia
- Denomination: Anglican Church of Australia

History
- Status: Active

Architecture
- Architect: Michael McCabe
- Style: Gothic Revival
- Years built: 1864-1865 (later additions)
- Completed: 1865

Administration
- Province: Victoria
- Diocese: Ballarat

St Paul's Anglican Church is a historic Anglican church located on the corner of Church and Fergusson Streets in Camperdown, Victoria, Australia. It serves as the principal place of worship for the local Anglican congregation within the Parish of Camperdown and Holy Apostles in the Anglican Diocese of Ballarat. Constructed primarily of bluestone, the church reflects successive phases of Gothic Revival ecclesiastical architecture from the mid-19th to mid-20th and contains a notable pipe organ and stained glass windows.

== History ==
Anglican worship in Camperdown commenced prior to the construction of a permanent church building, with early services held in the local Temperance Hall. Land and support for a dedicated church were provided by prominent local pastoralists, notably members of the Manifold family.

The foundation stone for St Paul's Anglican Church was laid in April 1864, and the church was opened in February 1865. It initially consisted of a simple rectangular nave built of bluestone in an Early English Gothic style, with a side porch, vestry, and a double bellcote over the west gable. Construction was carried out by the local contractor Richard Pimblett, with stonework undertaken by G. Buckley, at a reported cost of approximately £2,100. An adjacent vicarage was erected at the same time. In 1894, a lady chapel was created.

The church's pipe organ was constructed by Fincham and Hobday and installed in 1895, reportedly using material previously prepared for another instrument. The organ has undergone several rebuilds and refurbishments, including significant work undertaken by George Fincham & Sons in 1962, and remains in use for worship and concerts.

A square tower and spire were added in 1957, funded by the Manifold family. Supporting parish buildings, including the parish hall and Sunday school, were constructed in 1896-1897, with a Church of England grammar school occupying the hall from 1904 to 1923.

In August 1966, Dutch Australian stained glass artist Jean Orval was approached for the creation of memorial window for parishioners Canon and W. E. Moorhouse, who were killed in a car accident. The initial design of the stained glass window was not approved as it was deemed that the colouring of the sketches and the final window could not be differentiated. On 12 April 1967, Reverend Arthur Rutter made an order for one of Jean's designs, and placed a cartoon version of the design in the window in order to gain feedback from the congregation. On 4 September a vestry meeting determined that the design was suitable, and on Sunday 19 November, the window was installed, complete with a dedication ceremony.
