= Mount Porndon =

Mountain in Australia

Coordinates: 38°19′S 143°17′E

Mount Porndon is a 278-metre-high (912 ft) Stratovolcano located 13 kilometres southeast of Camperdown in western Victoria, Australia.

Mount Porndon is on private land. There is a fire tower on the summit as well as several radio communications facilities. It is a composite volcano of scoria resting on lava disc and tuff. The area around Mount Porndon is known as the stony rises. Early settlers used the abundance of rock to build extensive stone fences in the surrounding area.

== Description ==
Mount Porndon is the central higher part of a volcanic complex including lava flows, tuff deposits and scoria cones and craters. The site covers a broad area including the major elements of volcanic sequence. Some basalt lava flows extend from Mount Porndon forming rough stony rises, some of which reach Lake Corangamite. The younger of these flows formed an irregular lava disc roughly 3 km in diameter with a distinct and almost continuous perimeter in places forming a rocky wall 10 to 15 meters high. The stony rise flows have been dated at 300,000 years.

Overlying the lava disc is a thin layer of tuff. The main hills and cones were built from scoria eruptions which succeeded the phreatomagmatic stage after depleted groundwater. Small lava flows from some vents beneath the scoria are the last eruptive activity. The central cone of Mount Porndon has a crater 15 m deep and open to the west.
