= Wayne Linton =

Australian psychotherapist and former Australian rules footballer

Personal information
- Full name: Wayne Linton
- Born: 21 October 1955 (age 71)
- Original team: Camperdown
- Height: 180 cm (5 ft 11 in)
- Weight: 76 kg (168 lb)
- Position: Wing

Playing career^{1}
Years	Club	Games (Goals)
1974–78	Fitzroy	65 (17)
- ^{1} Playing statistics correct to the end of 1978.

Wayne Linton (born 21 October 1955) is an Australian psychotherapist, leadership coach, and speaker known for his one-on-one executive coaching and transformative programs for individuals from all walks of life. He is also a former Australian rules footballer who played with Fitzroy in the Victorian Football League (VFL).

== Occupation(s) ==
- Psychotherapist
- Author

== Website ==
www.waynelinton.com

www.awarenesscode.com

www.beyondincredible.com

www.acglobaltc.com

== Education ==
Bachelor Degree of Science

Diploma of Psychotherapy

Diploma of Hypnotherapy

Diploma of Education

== Career ==
Linton taught at the secondary school level for twenty years, with a focus on teaching Psychology in the last eight years. He transitioned into private psychotherapy practice in his early 40s. In his early 60s, he collaborated with Steve Tappin, CEO of Beyond Unity.

In 2017, Linton was the Master Practitioner at the Global Women of Inspiration event in Maui, Hawaii. Attendees included female global CEOs from the UK, USA, and China, including Maggie Chen, Secretary General of the China Entrepreneur Club.

Linton has since presented in China, the USA, Europe, Asia, and Australia, offering one-on-one coaching to global CEOs and helping organizations reshape leadership structures to achieve performance gains.

== Football Playing Career ==
1974–1978: 65 games, 17 goals

Playing position: Wing

== Publications ==
Linton, Wayne; Tappin, Steve (2021). The Awareness Code. Bloomsbury Publishing. ISBN 978-1-472-99207-9

== Programs and Initiatives ==
Beyond Incredible Group Program (BIG): A global group coaching and transformation initiative
