= Mount Emu Creek =

Mount Emu (Tarnpirr)
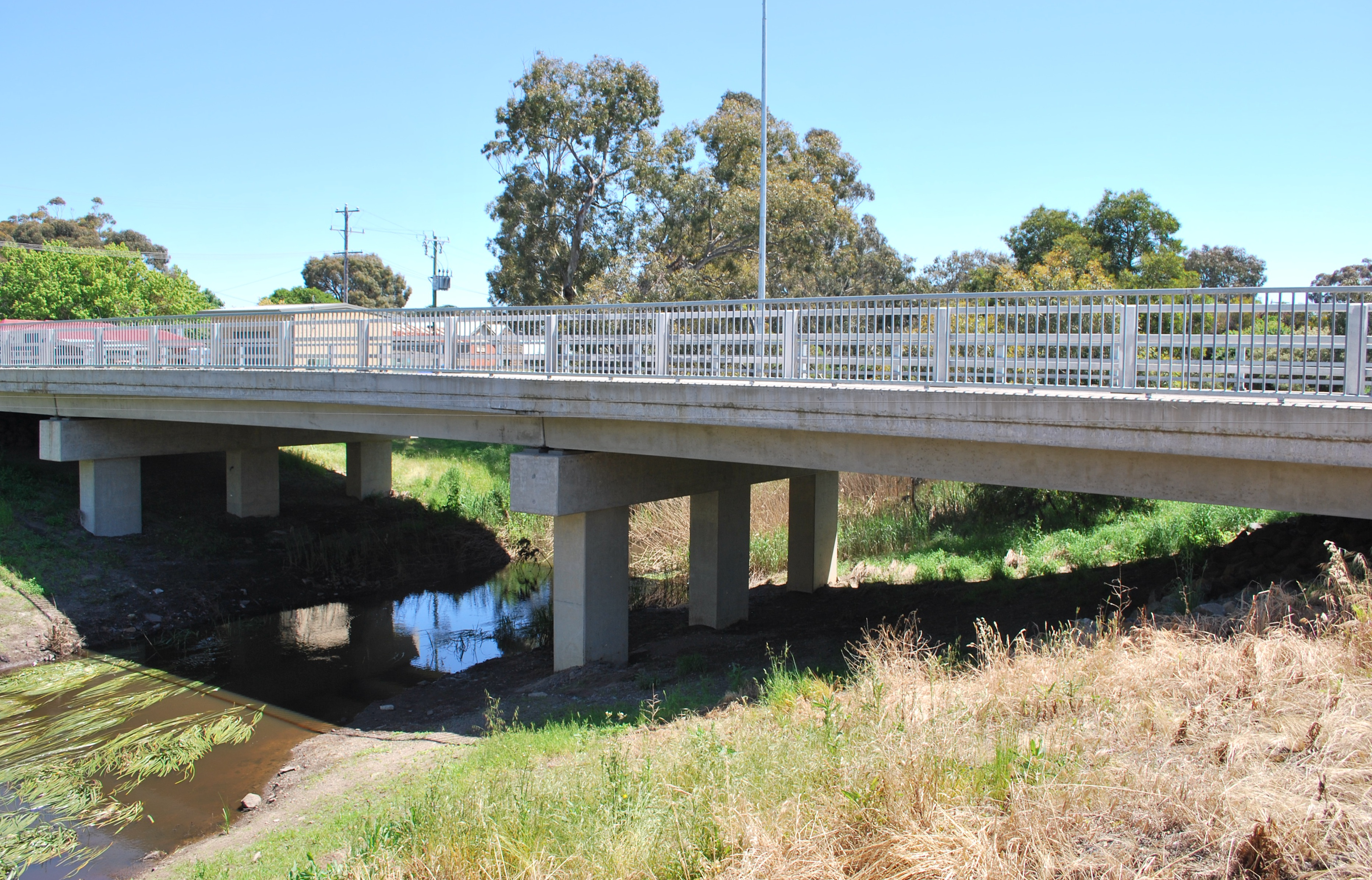
- The Mount Emu Creek flowing under a bridge that carries the Glenelg Highway, near Skipton.

- Location of the Mount Emu Creek mouth in Victoria

Location
- Country: Australia
- State: Victoria
- Region: Victorian Midlands, Naracoorte Coastal Plain (IBRA), Western District
- Local government areas: Pyrenees, Ararat, Moyne
- Towns: Beaufort, Skipton, Darlington, Terang, Panmure

Physical characteristics
- Source
  - location: north of Trawalla
  - coordinates: 37°20′27″S 143°31′48″E
  - elevation: 405 m (1,329 ft)
- Mouth: confluence with Hopkins River
  - location: near Cudgee, northeast of Warrnambool
  - coordinates: 38°19′36″S 142°38′22″E
  - elevation: 28 m (92 ft)
- Length: 250 km (160 mi)

Basin features
- River system: Glenelg Hopkins catchment
- Tributaries
  - left: Spring Hill Creek, Baillie Creek, Blind Creek, Elingamite Creek
  - right: Trawalla Creek, Broken Creek (Victoria)

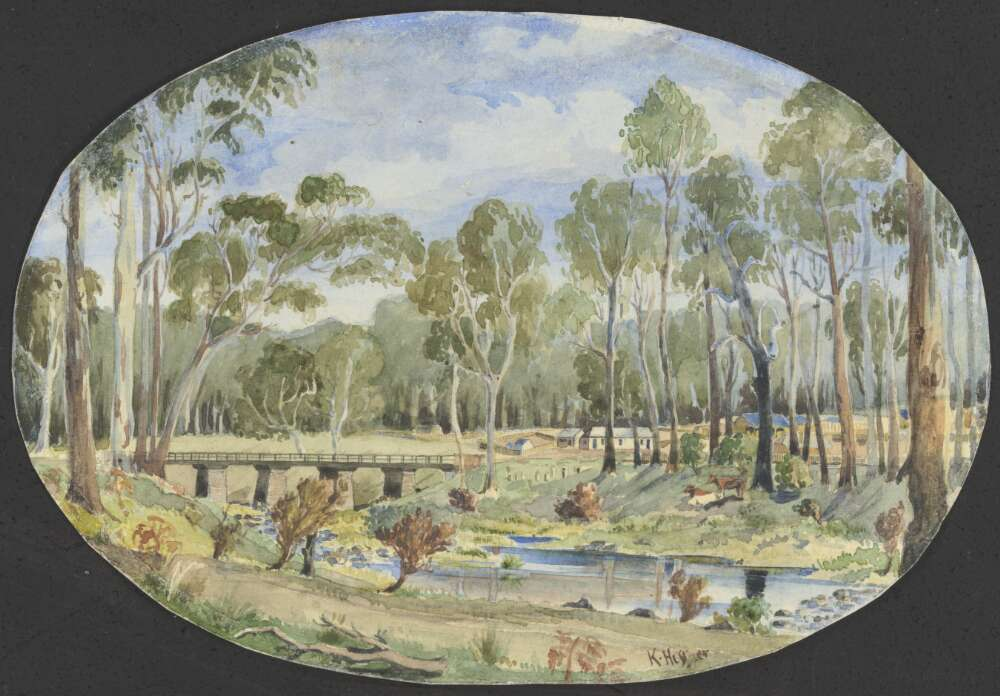
Bridge & township of Panmure on the Emu Creek, Victoria, c.1888 watercolour by Karl Heffner

The Mount Emu Creek (Aboriginal Australian:Tarnpirr), a perennial creek of the Glenelg Hopkins catchment, is located in the Western District of Victoria, Australia.

== Course and features ==
The Mount Emu Creek is a 250-kilometre (160 mi) waterway and is the longest creek in Victoria. The creek rises near Trawalla and flows generally south by southwest, joined by six tributaries, before reaching its confluence with the Hopkins River, northeast of Warrnambool. The river descends 377 metres (1,237 ft) over its 271-kilometre (168 mi) course. Mount Emu Creek is the major waterway within the Hopkins basin.

The waterway starts as a series of creeks and waterways that merge to form the Mount Emu Creek, which flows through areas around Beaufort, Skipton, Darlington, Terang and Panmure. It joins the Hopkins River, which eventually leads out to sea at Warrnambool.

The Baillie Creek drains Lake Burrumbeet and flows into the Mount Emu Creek west of Snake Valley. The Elingamite Creek drains Lake Elingamite and flows into the Mount Emu Creek south of Terang.

The creek is traversed by the Western Highway near Trawalla, the Glenelg Highway at Skipton, the Hamilton Highway at Darlington, and the Princes Highway near Terang.

== Platypuses ==
Mount Emu Creek abounds in redfin and is the home of many platypuses. Surveys in 1991 and 1996 confirmed that platypus are breeding successfully right in the heart of Skipton township, where on a bend in the creek at Stewart Park in the centre of town is a platform built on the banks of the creek from which to observe them. An all night research session along the Mount Emu Creek was conducted by the Australian Platypus Conservancy in August 2003, in collaboration with Skipton's Stewart Park Committee. A baby female was one of six platypuses found in the 5-kilometre (3.1 mi) section of the creek. Weighing in at 680 grams (24 oz), the tiny juvenile had probably only first ventured out of her burrow a week or so previously. Geoff Williams, a biologist with the Conservancy, said that the youngster was in really good condition and her presence confirmed that successful breeding is taking place in the township.

== Murdering Gully massacre ==
The Murdering Gully massacre occurred in a gully on Mount Emu Creek, where a small stream adjoins from Mérida station (near Camperdown) in early 1839. Between 35 and 40 men, women and children of the Tarnbeere gundidj clan were shot dead by Frederick Taylor and other shepherds for the killing of several sheep.

== See also ==
- List of rivers of Australia § Victoria
