= Camperdown, Victoria =

Camperdown
- Town
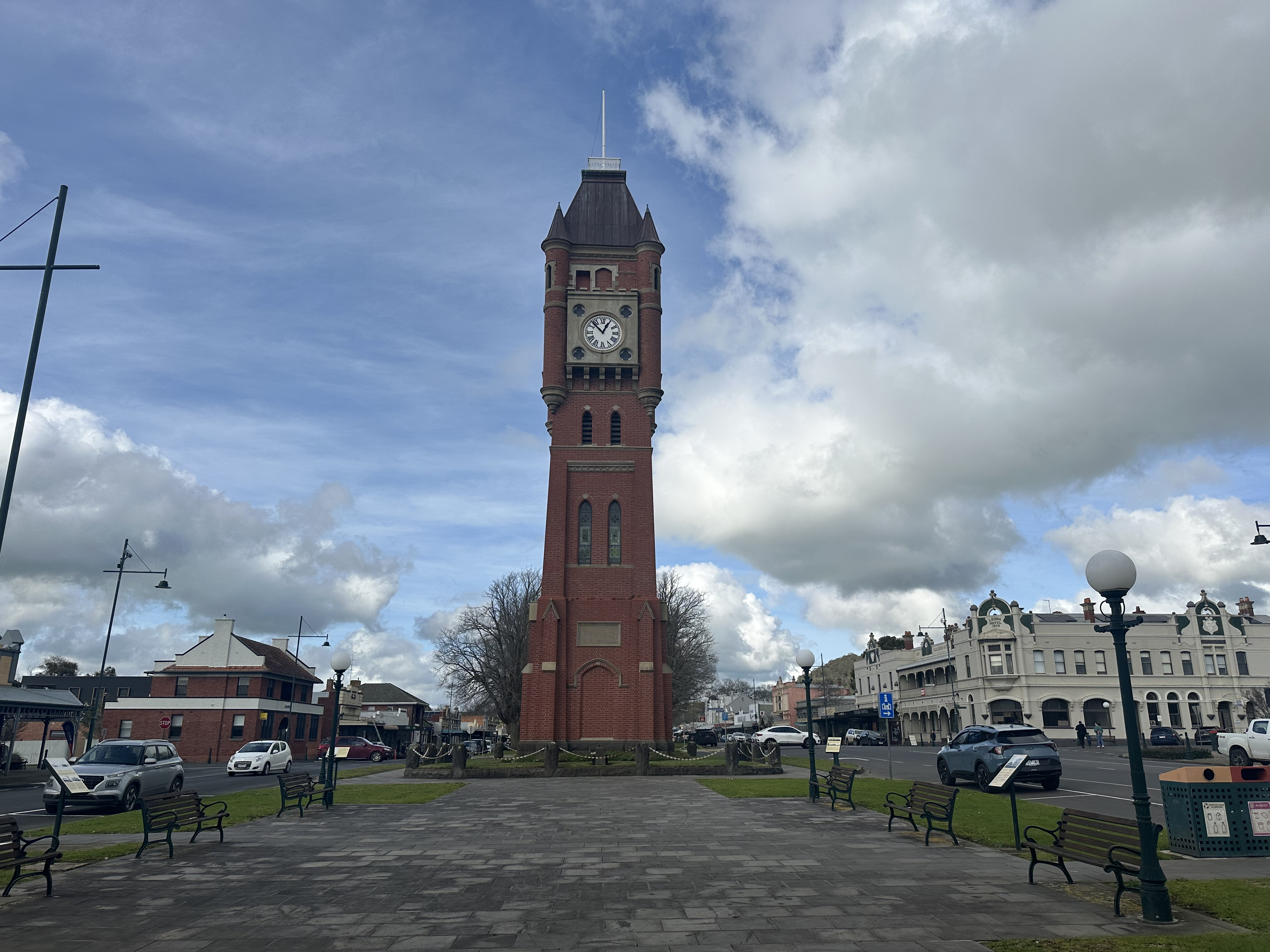
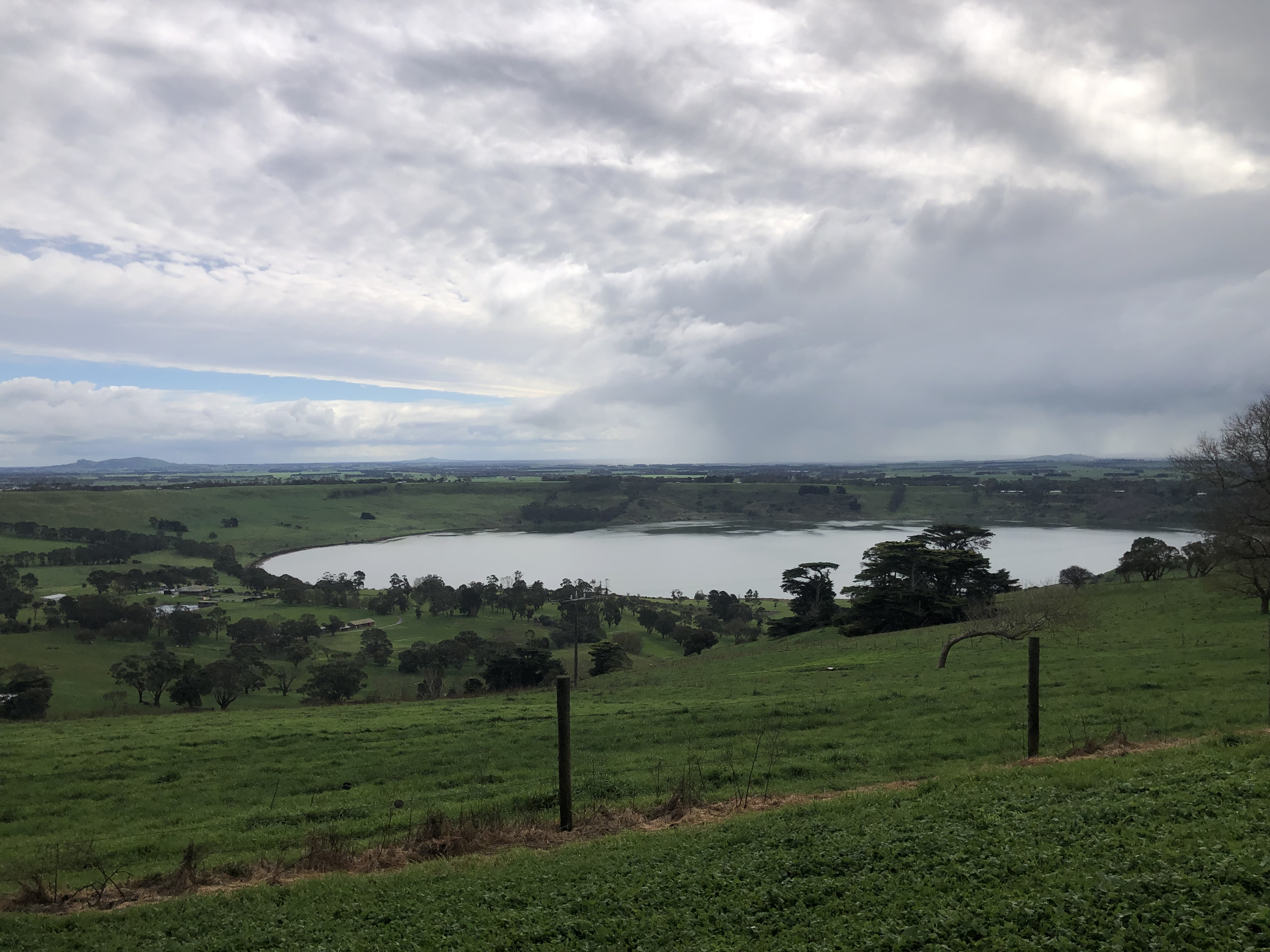
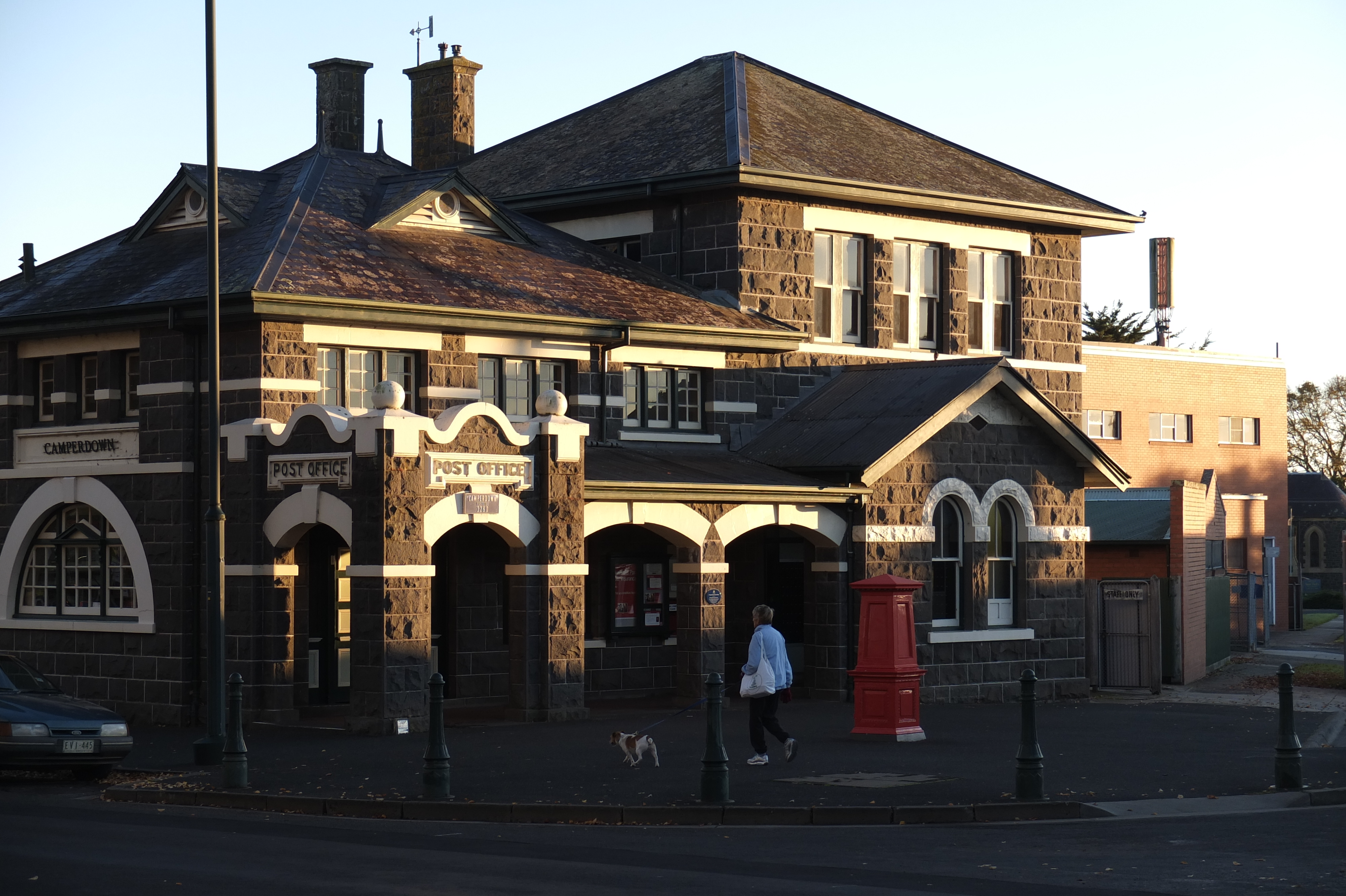
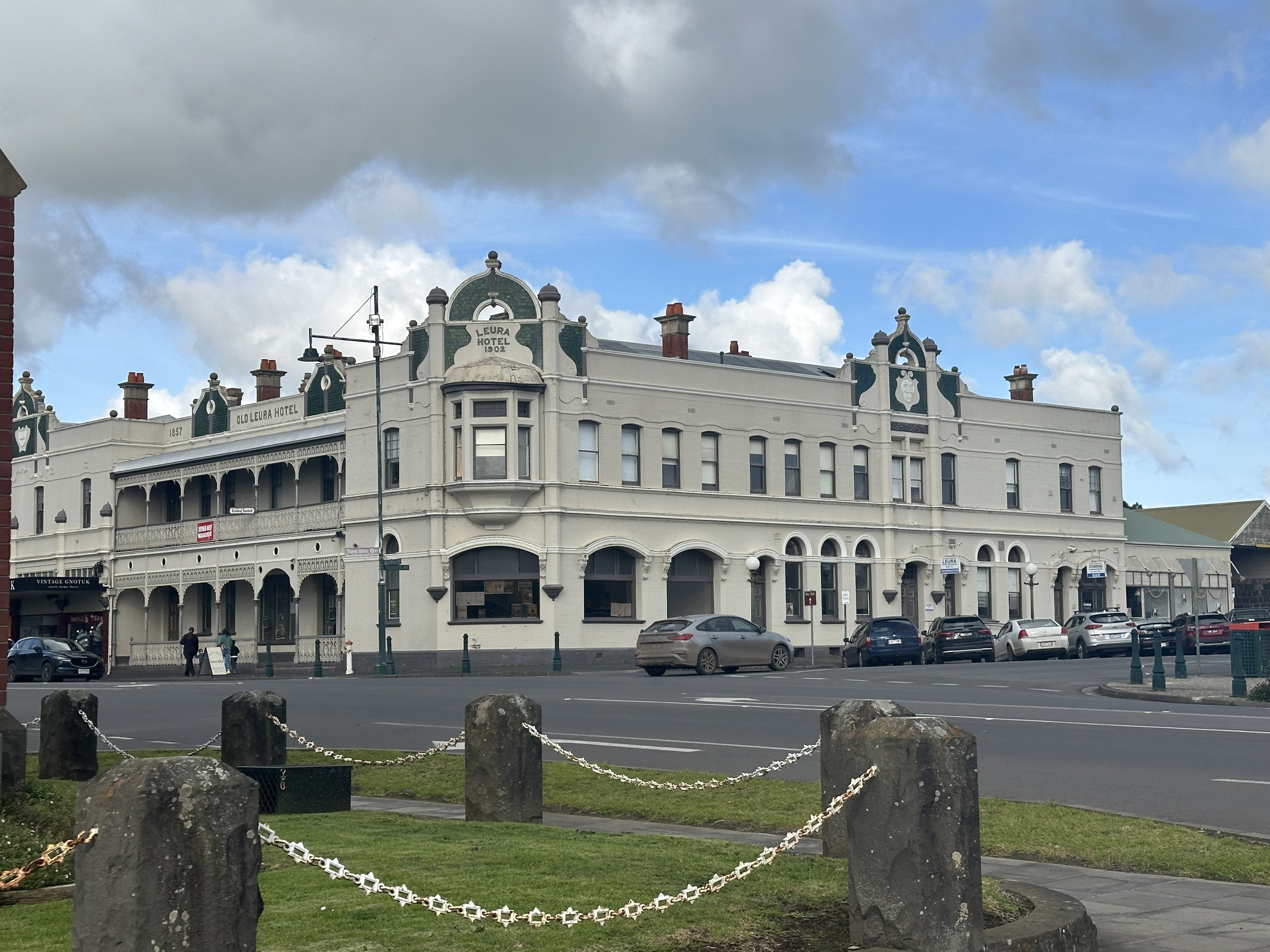
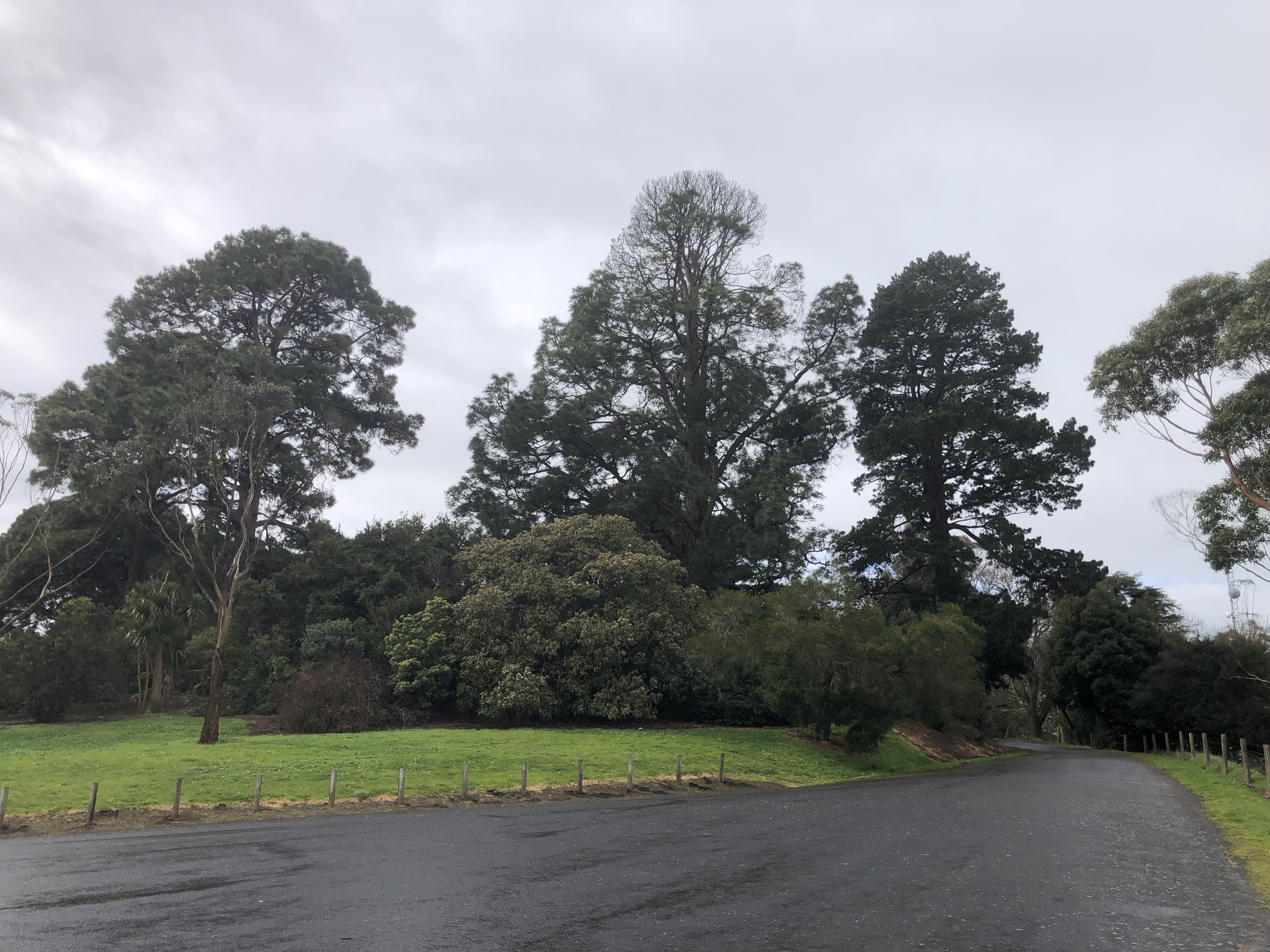
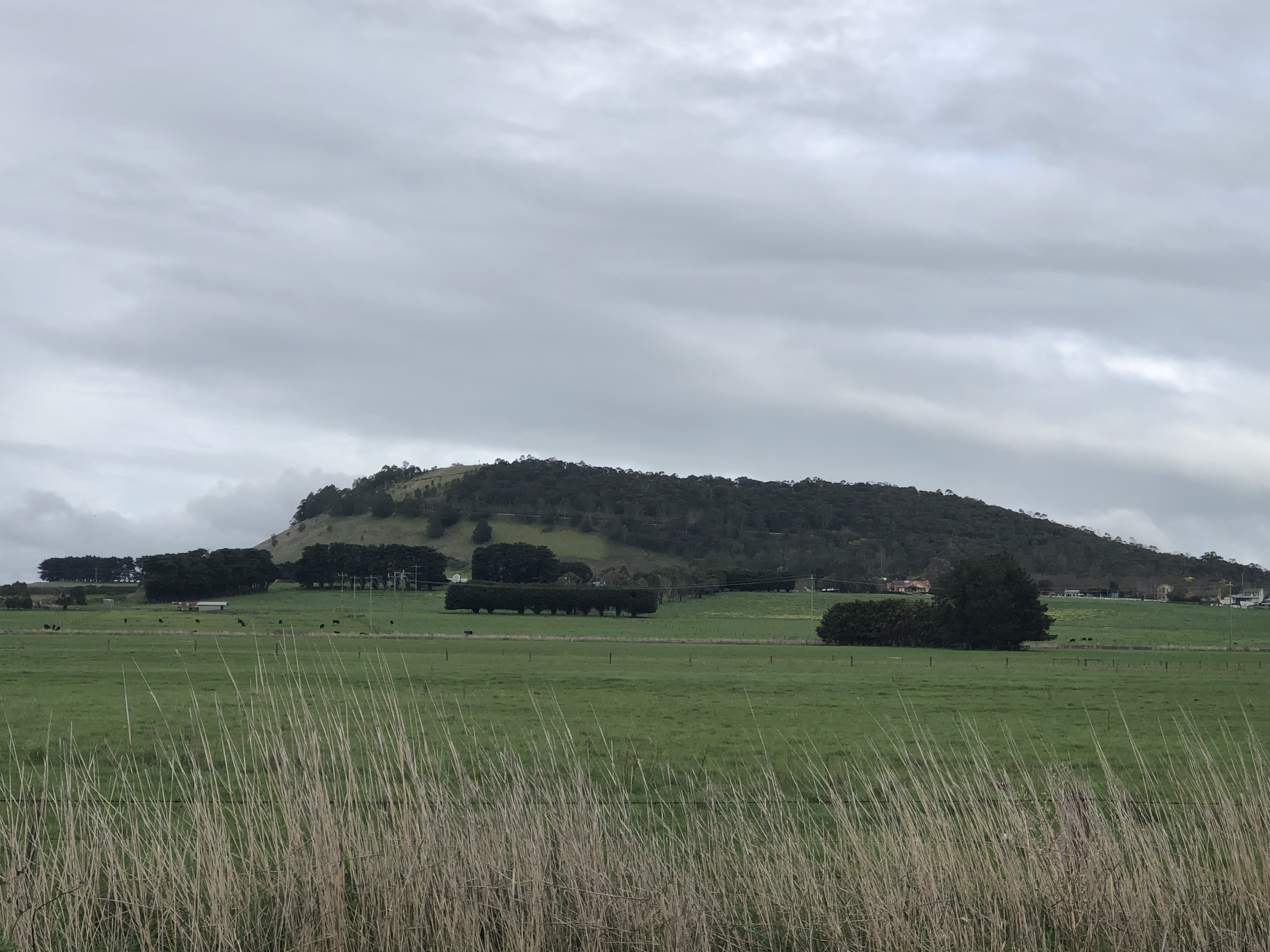
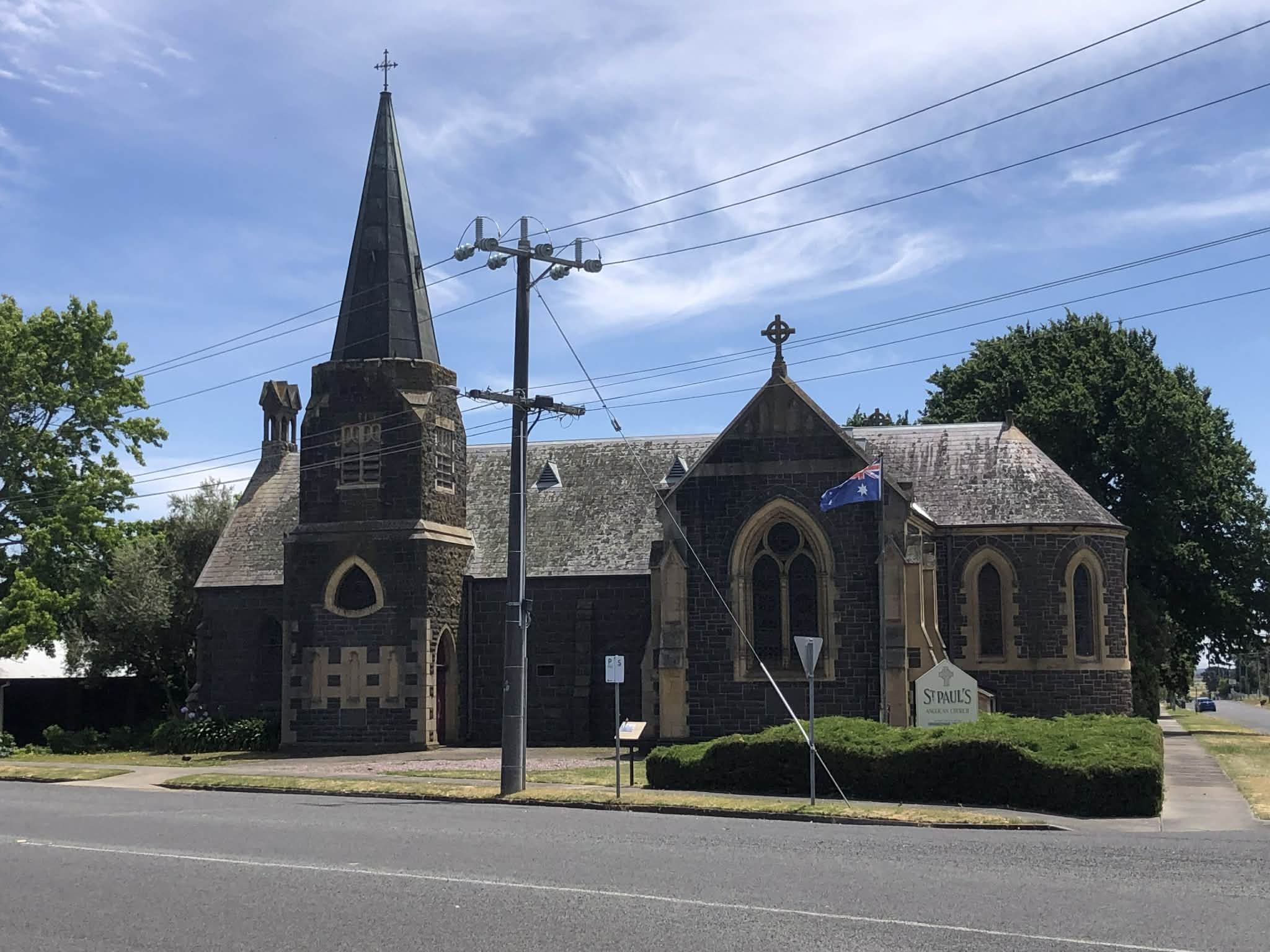
- View of the clock tower in Camperdown Lake Gnotuk Post Office Leura Hotel Botanic Gardens Mount Leura St Paul's Anglican Church

- Coordinates: 38°14′S 143°09′E
- Country: Australia
- State: Victoria
- LGA: Corangamite Shire
- Location: 190 km (120 mi) SW of Melbourne; 45 km (28 mi) W of Colac; 108 km (67 mi) SW of Ballarat; 69 km (43 mi) NE of Warrnambool
- Established: 1854

Government
  - State electorate: Polwarth
  - Federal division: Wannon
- Elevation: 165 m (541 ft)

Population
  - Total: 3,354 (2021 census)
- Postcode: 3260
- Mean max temp: 19.1 °C (66.4 °F)
- Mean min temp: 8.1 °C (46.6 °F)
- Annual rainfall: 762.4 mm (30.02 in)

Camperdown (/ˈkæmpərdaʊn/) is a town in the southwestern part of the Australian state of Victoria, 190 km (120 mi) west of the state capital, Melbourne. At the 2021 census, Camperdown had a population of 3,354.

== History ==
The Djargurd Wurrung people were the traditional Aboriginal people of the Camperdown area, who had lived in the area for countless generations as a semi-nomadic hunter gatherer society. The first British settlers, the Manifold brothers (Thomas, John and Peter Manifold), arrived in the area from Van Diemen's Land (Tasmania) after 1835 to establish sheep and cattle runs.

Settlement was met with resistance by some of the Djargurd Wurrung. One method of resistance was to drive off or kill the settlers sheep, and an allegation of sheep killing was behind the Murdering Gully massacre.

The area's history records instances of mutual assistance and friendship between native and settler people. Notable on this account is the family of David Fenton, the Scottish Presbyterian shepherd and drover who built the first house in Camperdown in 1853.

The original settlement was several miles to the north, near where the racecourse is now located. The settlement was called Timboon, but after a wet winter it was decided to move the town to higher ground nestled at the base of Mount Leura. With the relocation of the town, the local lake then known as Lake Timboon reverted to its indigenous name of Golongulac now known as Lake Colongulac.

The town was surveyed in 1851 and some of the founding fathers had Duncan as their Christian name. Wanting something more prestigious than Duncan as the town name it was decided to name the township Camperdown after Scottish Royal Navy admiral Lord Viscount Adam Duncan, who was the Earl of Camperdown. The first dwelling was erected on the site of the present Commercial Hotel in 1853 and the Post Office opened on 1 January 1854, replacing an earlier one in the area named Timboon.

In 1883 Wombeetch Puuyuun (also known as Camperdown George) died at the age of 43 and was buried in a bog outside the bounds of Camperdown Cemetery. His friend, James Dawson was shocked at this burial upon his return from a trip to Scotland, and personally reburied Wombeetch in Camperdown Cemetery. He appealed for money to raise a monument, but finding little public support, he primarily funded the monument himself. The 7 metre obelisk was erected as a memorial to Wombeetch Puuyuun and the Aboriginal people of the district, and has been described as being still inspiring today.

It became the service centre for the vast pastoral empires of the region. The Port Fairy railway line was opened in 1883, and the Timboon railway line was constructed in 1892.

By the mid 20th century Camperdown had emerged as a more diverse centre for dairy farming which drew on its rich volcanic soil, for woolgrowing and for produce processing industries. The Camperdown Magistrates' Court closed on 1 January 1990.

The town made the news in 1991 due to an industrial dispute at the local abattoir. The dispute over pay and conditions occasionally turned violent between Police and picketers. The owner closed the site and the export licence transferred to another plant in Shepparton. 130 casual jobs were lost and many workers had to leave town in search for new employment.

A local milk factory relocated to Cobden.

By the late 20th century the town had become a major centre for tourism because of its unspoiled 19th century architecture and as a gateway to the southern tourist attractions of the Otway Ranges, the Great Ocean Road and the 'Shipwreck Coast'.

In more recent years, the drought in Australia in the 21st century has affected Camperdown's dairy industry.

== Geography ==
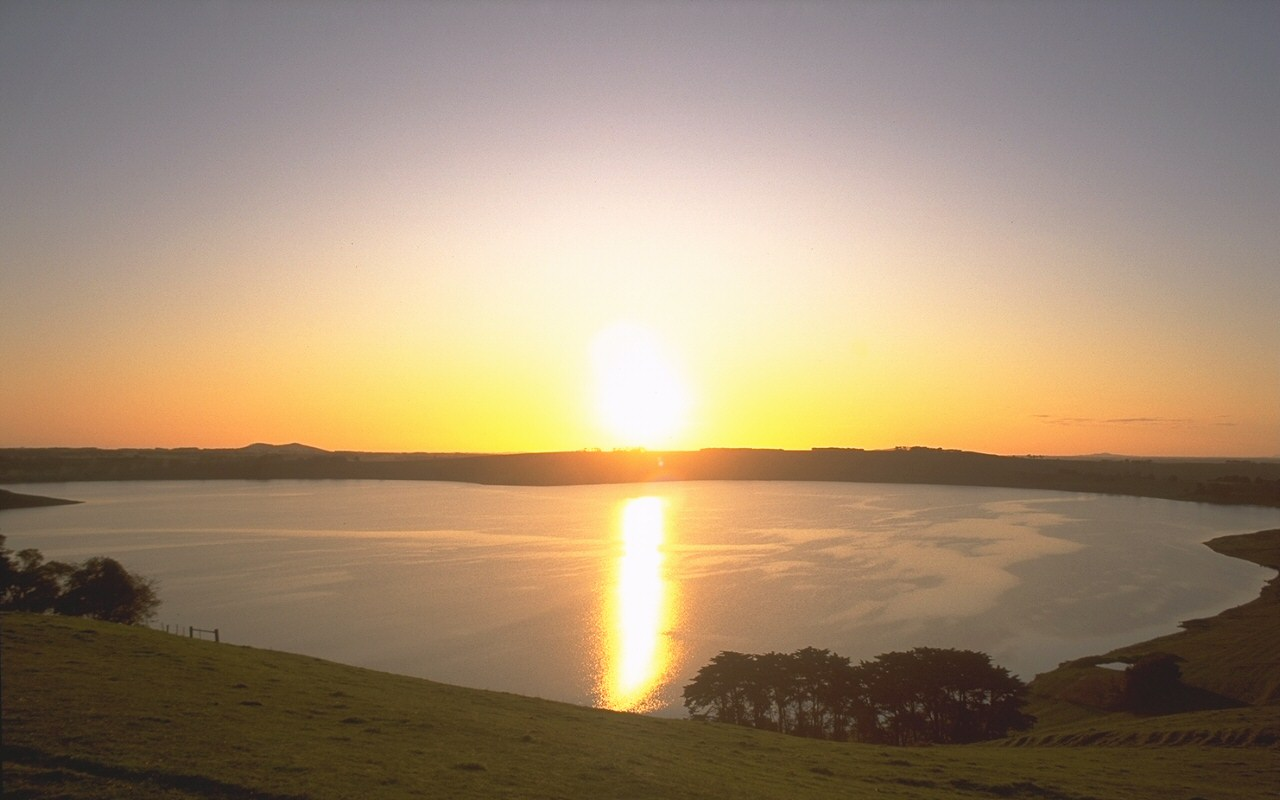
Lake Bullen-Merri at Sunset.

Camperdown lies within the 'Lakes and Craters' region, sitting at the foot of Mount Leura which together with nearby Mount Sugarloaf are part of a large extinct volcanic complex known as the "Leura Maar". To the immediate west are the deep volcanic crater lakes Bullen-Merri and Gnotuk while to the east is the crater lake Purrumbete popular for its Trout and Chinook Salmon fishing.

It is the starting point of the Crater to Coast Rail Trail which, when completed, will reach Port Campbell. It currently terminates in Timboon.

== Climate ==
Climate data for Camperdown, Victoria
Month	Jan	Feb	Mar	Apr	May	Jun	Jul	Aug	Sep	Oct	Nov	Dec	Year
Record high °C (°F)	41.7 (107.1)	40.6 (105.1)	39.4 (102.9)	32.7 (90.9)	25.4 (77.7)	18.3 (64.9)	21.0 (69.8)	22.1 (71.8)	27.8 (82.0)	32.2 (90.0)	38.0 (100.4)	38.6 (101.5)	41.7 (107.1)
Mean daily maximum °C (°F)	26.1 (79.0)	26.1 (79.0)	23.7 (74.7)	19.2 (66.6)	15.7 (60.3)	13.0 (55.4)	12.6 (54.7)	13.6 (56.5)	15.9 (60.6)	18.5 (65.3)	20.7 (69.3)	23.7 (74.7)	19.1 (66.4)
Mean daily minimum °C (°F)	11.6 (52.9)	12.3 (54.1)	11.0 (51.8)	8.7 (47.7)	6.8 (44.2)	4.8 (40.6)	4.2 (39.6)	4.8 (40.6)	6.1 (43.0)	7.4 (45.3)	8.8 (47.8)	10.4 (50.7)	8.1 (46.6)
Record low °C (°F)	4.7 (40.5)	6.8 (44.2)	4.6 (40.3)	2.2 (36.0)	2.2 (36.0)	−0.6 (30.9)	−0.6 (30.9)	−0.6 (30.9)	0.6 (33.1)	−0.6 (30.9)	2.2 (36.0)	5.0 (41.0)	−0.6 (30.9)
Average rainfall mm (inches)	38.2 (1.50)	38.7 (1.52)	46.6 (1.83)	60.5 (2.38)	75.0 (2.95)	78.9 (3.11)	81.4 (3.20)	91.5 (3.60)	82.1 (3.23)	73.6 (2.90)	61.1 (2.41)	48.8 (1.92)	775.9 (30.55)
Average rainy days (≥ 1.0 mm)	5.4	5.0	6.3	8.8	11.7	12.1	13.3	13.9	12.5	11.0	8.8	6.9	115.7
Source: Australian Bureau of Meteorology

== Landmarks ==
The town is known for its classic historical buildings. The most notable is the 103-foot (31 m) high Gothic Manifold Clock Tower, built in 1897, which sits in a wide Elm lined median between the dual carriageways of Manifold Street, named in honour of one of the pioneer pastoralists. The Tower, avenue, Boer War memorial, Soldiers' memorial, memorial cross and JC Manifold statue are all listed on the Victorian Heritage Register.

Among the many other classic buildings are the 1886–87 two storey Georgian style Court House, the 1863 two storey bluestone (granite) Camperdown Post Office, Theatre Royal (1890), St Paul's Anglican Church (1865) and Masonic Hall (1867–68).

The town has a life-sized statue of the Scottish poet Robert Burns, carved from sandstone in the 1830s and based on the earliest painting of the Bard. Efforts to restore the statue led to a festival celebrating the town's connection with Burns being held in 2012 and then annually.

== Media ==
Camperdown is served by one local newspaper, The Camperdown Chronicle. Television services are receivable in Camperdown via UHF from Ballarat Lookout Hill. Radio services are mainly received from Colac, but some Warrnambool radio stations can also be received in Camperdown.

== Local government ==
Originally, Camperdown was part of the East Riding of the Shire of Hampden, which was incorporated in 1857. On 9 September 1952, Camperdown severed and incorporated as a separate borough. It became a town on 21 January 1959.

On 23 September 1994, the Town was abolished, and merged with the Shire of Hampden, most of the Heytesbury, parts of the Shires of Colac and Mortlake, and the area around Princetown on the Great Ocean Road, becoming the Shire of Corangamite.

The Town of Camperdown was not subdivided into wards, and the nine councillors represented the entire area.

== Transport ==
Camperdown is situated on the Princes Highway (A1), which is the main through road and also the main street (Manifold Street). A dual carriageway with a large central reservation and secondary service street runs through the centre of town. The highway runs west to Terang and beyond to Warrnambool and east to Colac and beyond to Geelong. Secondary roads include the Camperdown-Lismore Road which heads north to Lismore and the Camperdown-Cobden Road (C164) which heads south to Cobden. Just west at Gnotuk is the Darlington Road (C173) which leads north to Darlington.

Road coaches (buses) provide links within Camperdown, to neighbouring towns and nearby cities (mainly V/Line) and these services include Cobden, Timboon, Simpson and the city of Ballarat.

The town's railway station is served by V/Line passenger services on the Warrnambool line linking it to the cities of Warrnambool, Geelong and Melbourne.

== Sport and recreation ==
The town has many sporting clubs. Archery, badminton, cricket, cycling, golf, horse riding, lawn bowls, squash and tennis, water skiing and yachting have competitions in and around the town. The Camperdown community is heavily involved in competitive sport with the principal sport being Australian rules football. The town has a football team playing in the Hampden Football League.

Camperdown has a horse racing club, the Camperdown Turf Club, which holds one race meeting a year, the Camperdown Cup meeting in January. Camperdown is also home to the Lakes & Craters International Horse Trials, founded by Barry Roycroft in 1978.

Golfers play at the Camperdown Golf Club on Lake Bullen Merri Road.

There are also many groups providing arts and culture including the Camperdown Theatre Company, Lakes and Craters Band and Corangamite Arts.

== Notable citizens ==
- Clyde Sefton – Silver Medalist 1972 Summer Olympics in Munich
- Kevin Bradshaw – Represented Australia at the 1980 Moscow Olympics
- Grace Brown – Gold Medalist 2024 Summer Olympics in Paris UCI Women's WorldTeam
- Penny Smith – Bronze medalist 2024 Summer Olympics
- Norm Sharp – Geelong Premiership player 1952
- James Chester Manifold – Politician elected at federation.
- Sir Chester Manifold – First Chairman of the Victorian Totalisator Agency Board (TAB)
- Cameron Rahles-Rahbula – four-time Paralympian
- Paul Broderick – Fitzroy and Richmond footballer
- Scott Lucas – Essendon premiership player 2000
- Ross Thornton – Fitzroy footballer
- Wayne Linton – Fitzroy footballer
- Adam Coote – AFL Boundary Umpire
- Len White – Geelong footballer
- Geoffrey Wickham AO – cardiac pacemaker pioneer
- Bill Roycroft – Olympian
- Sarah Wall – ANZ Championship Netballer, Melbourne Vixens (2009, 2011); Queensland Firebirds (2010)
- Brydon Coverdale – Contestant on The Chase Australia
- Easton Wood – Australian rules footballer for Western Bulldogs (2008–present)
- David Lake – Inaugural coach of Gold Coast Suns Women's side
- Ken Hinkley – Senior coach of Port Adelaide Football Club
- Stewart McArthur – Federal member for Corangamite – 1984–2007
- Sam Walsh – Australian Rules footballer for Carlton Football Club
