= Mia-mia =

Temporary shelter made by some groups of Indigenous Australians

A mia-mia is a temporary shelter made of bark, branches, leaves and grass used by some Indigenous Australians. The word is also used in Australian English to mean "a temporary shelter". There is ongoing debate on whether the word comes from the Wathawurrung language or the Noongar language. The term is also used in New Zealand, where it is usually spelt mai-mai or maimai and has the slightly different meaning of a shelter or hide used by a duck-hunter.

== See also ==
- Humpy
