= Dhauwurd Wurrung language =

Extinct Australian Aboriginal language

Gunditjmara
- Dhauwurd Wurrung, Warrnambool
- Gurnditjmara
- Native to: Australia
- Region: Victoria
- Ethnicity: Gunditjmara (Dhauwurd wurrung), Djargurd Wurrung, Girai wurrung, ?Gadubanud
- Extinct: by 1975
- Revival: efforts exist
- Language family: Pama–Nyungan: Kulinic; Drual; Gunditjmara
- Dialects: Keerray Woorroong; Koornkopanoot; Gaiwurrung; Djargurd Wurrong; Wulluwurrung; Wirngilgnad dhalinanong

Language codes
- ISO 639-3: Either: gjm – Gunditjmara wkr – Keerray-Woorroong
- Glottolog: warr1257
- AIATSIS: S20 Dhauwurd Wurrung, S25 Keerray-Woorroong
- ELP: Warrnambool
- Location of Dhawurd Wurrung (Gunditjmara) Country in Victoria

Dhauwurd Wurrung is a term used for a group of languages spoken by various groups of the Gunditjmara people of the Western District of Victoria, Australia. Keerray Woorroong (also spelt Girai Wurrung and variants) is regarded by some as a separate language, by others as a dialect. The dialect continuum consisted of various lects such as Kuurn Kopan Noot, Big Wurrung, Gai Wurrung, and others (each with variant spellings). There was no traditional name for the entire dialect continuum and it has been classified and labelled differently by different linguists and researchers. The group of languages is also referred to as Gunditjmara and Warrnambool.

Efforts to revive the language(s) are ongoing.

== Country ==
The language in its several varieties, was spoken from Glenelg to the Gellibrand and through to roughly 100 kilometres (60 mi) inland.

The effects of the colonisation of Victoria, which included the Eumeralla Wars, along with later government policies leading to the stolen generation, had a drastic and ongoing negative effect on the languages. Today the descendants of the speakers of these lects commonly refer to themselves as Gunditjmara, a term derived from an affix used to denote membership with a specific group of locality.

== Dialects and alternative names ==
AIATSIS (AUSTLANG) uses the name and spelling "Dhauwurd Wurrung" for the main grouping, following the Victorian Aboriginal Corporation for Languages and Ian Clark, and gives also detail on alternative groupings and names suggested by various other linguists. Alternative spellings include Djargurd Wurrung, Thaguwurung, Tyaupurt wurung, Dauwert woorong, Dhauhwurru, Dhau-urt-wuru, Tourahonong, and many others, and the language group is also referred to as the Warrnambool language or the Gunditjmara language. Gunditj Wurrung, meaning "Gunditj language" is used by a contemporary teacher of the language, Gunditjmara musician Corey Theatre.

Keerray Woorroong (Girai Wurrung, Kirrae wuurong, Kiriwurrung, etc.) is regarded by the Victorian Aboriginal Corporation for Languages (following Clark) as a separate language; it is of the Girai wurrung people

Gadubanud (Tindale Katubanut), also Yarro waetch, "Cape Otway tribe", was spoken by a group known as the Gadubanud, of the Cape Otway area. Barry Blake regards this as a dialect of the Warrnambool language, but Krishna-Pillay does not.

Djargurd Wurrong (Warn tallin, Warn thalayn, Tjarcote, Dhautgart/Keerray (wurru)) was the language of the Djargurd Wurrong people.

Other dialects or alternative names include: (Note: AIATSIS primary spellings as of 2021 are used for this list.)

- Koornkopanoot (Kuurn Kopan Noot also spelt Kurnkupanut by Blake)
- Bi:gwurrung (Peek-Whurrung and variants, "the Port Fairy tribe")
- Gaiwurrung (Kii wuurong, Kayiwurrung)
- Wulluwurrung (Wuluwurrung, Woolwoowurrong)
- Wirngilgnad dhalinanong (Wirngill gnat tallinanong) (regarded as a sub-dialect of Giraiwurrung by Clark)
- Koort-Kirrup? Only recorded by Dixon; Clark says that Koort-Kirrup is the name of a person who spoke Wulluwurung

== Characteristics and significant words ==
Speakers of these languages had a form of avoidance speech called gnee wee banott (turn tongue) which required special terms and grammar in conversations when a man and mother-in-law were speaking in each other's company. Thus, if one asked: "Where are you going just now?", this would be phrased in normal speech as:

- Wuunda gnin kitneean?

In Gunditjmara avoidance speech the same sentiment would be articulated quite differently:

- Wuun gni gnin gninkeewan?

=== Ngamadjidj ===
The term ngamadjidj was used to denote white people by the Gunditjmara, with the same word used in the Wergaia dialect of the Wemba Wemba language. The word is also used to refer to ghosts, as people with pale skins were thought to be the spirits of ancestors. The first known use is to refer to William Buckley, an escaped convict who lived with the Wathaurong people near Geelong from 1803 until 1856.

The term was also applied to John Green, manager at Coranderrk, an Aboriginal reserve north-east of Melbourne between 1863 and 1924. It was also recorded as being used to describe other missionaries such as William Watson in Wellington, New South Wales, by the local Wiradjuri people. The term was a compliment, as it meant that the local people thought that they had been an Aboriginal person once - based largely on the fact that they could speak the local language.

Ngamadjidj is also the name given to a rock art site in a shelter in the Grampians National Park, sometimes translated as the "Cave of Ghosts".

== Status and language revival ==
Only three speakers were known to speak the language still by 1880, with another four still fluent in the Bi:gwurrung (Peek-Whurrung) dialect. No fluent speakers have been recorded between 1975 and the 2016 Australian census.

There are several ongoing efforts to revive the Gunditjmara language. These include the Gunditj Wurrung online lesson series on YouTube and the Laka Gunditj Language Program. Proponents of the revival of the language include Vicki Couzens and Corey Theatre, who uses music as a medium for language revival.

== In popular culture ==
Gunditjmara composer, singer and guitarist, Corey Theatre in collaboration with Australian composer and music director Iain Grandage created the Gunditjmara Six Seasons. The piece is sung entirely in the Gunditjmara language and was performed in collaboration with Aboriginal (Gunditjmara and Bundjalung) Australian musician Archie Roach at the 2016 Port Fairy Spring Music Festival.

Australian composer and soprano, Deborah Cheetham, wrote Australia's first requiem based on the frontier wars between Aboriginal Australian people in South Western Victoria and settlers which is sung entirely in the Gunditjmara language. The first performance of the requiem, "Eumeralla, a war requiem for peace" on 15 June 2019 in Melbourne featured Cheetham with the Melbourne Symphony Orchestra, the MSO Chorus and the Dhungala Children's Choir.

== Phonology ==
A likely phonemic inventory for the Warrnambool language is shown below.

Consonants
	Labial	Dental	Alveolar	Retroflex	Palatal	Velar
Stop	p	t̪	t	ʈ	c	k
Nasal	m	n̪	n	ɳ	ɲ	ŋ
Lateral		l̪	l	ɭ	ʎ	
Rhotic			ɾ~r	ɽ		
Approximant					j	w

Rhotic consonants were not distinguished in older sources. It is unclear to determine whether the retroflex consonant was a glide [ɻ] or a flap [ɽ]. Both were written as r.

Although most Australian Aboriginal languages use three vowels /a/, /i/, and /u/, the amount of vowels are not clearly distinguished within the other sources for the Warrnambool language, although it may be likely that it had a five-vowel system as /a, e, i, o, u/. There is some fluctuation between /i/ and /e/, and /u/ and /o/. In the orthography adopted by Blake, 'where there was a back vowel occurring before a syllable-final palatal, /o/ was used instead of /u/, to give a better idea of the more likely pronunciation (i.e. puroyn "night")'.
