= Hopkins River =

Hopkins
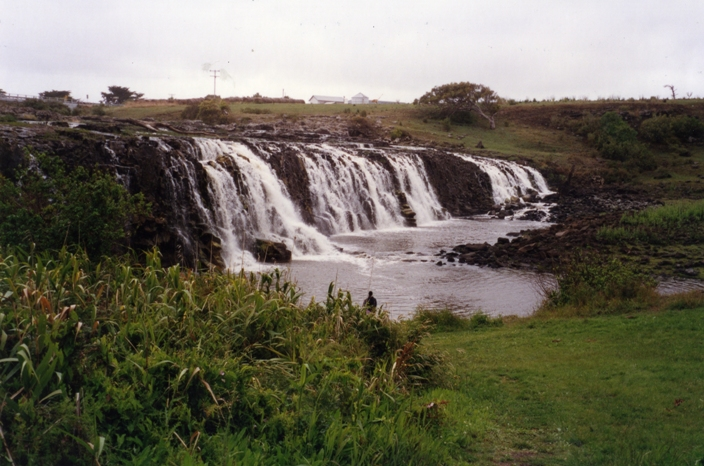
- Hopkins Falls, near Wangoom, in 1993

- Location of the Hopkins River mouth in Victoria
- Etymology: In honour of Sir John Paul Hopkins.

Location
- Country: Australia
- State: Victoria
- Region: Victorian Midlands (IBRA), Western District
- Local government area: Moyne Shire, Warrnambool

Physical characteristics
- Source
  - location: near Ararat
  - coordinates: 38°0′54″S 142°8′15″E
  - elevation: 338 m (1,109 ft)
- Mouth: Southern Ocean
  - location: Warrnambool
  - coordinates: 38°24′9″S 142°30′29″E
  - elevation: 0 m (0 ft)
- Length: 271 km (168 mi)
- Basin size: 8,843.9 km^{2} (3,414.6 mi^{2})
- Discharge
  - location: Near mouth
  - average: 62.6 m^{3}/s (1,980 GL/a)

Basin features
- River system: Glenelg Hopkins catchment
- Tributaries
  - left: Jacksons Creek (Moyne Shire, Victoria), Salt Creek (Moyne Shire, Victoria), Stony Creek (Moyne Shire, Victoria), Mount Emu Creek, Brucknell Creek
  - right: Back Creek (Moyne Shire, Victoria), Reedy Creek (Moyne Shire, Victoria), Bushy Creek (Moyne Shire, Victoria), Back Creek, Two (Moyne Shire, Victoria), Chirrup Creek, Grays Creek, Mustons Creek
- Waterfall: Hopkins Falls

The Hopkins River, a perennial river of the Glenelg Hopkins catchment, is located in the Western District of Victoria, Australia.

== Course and features ==
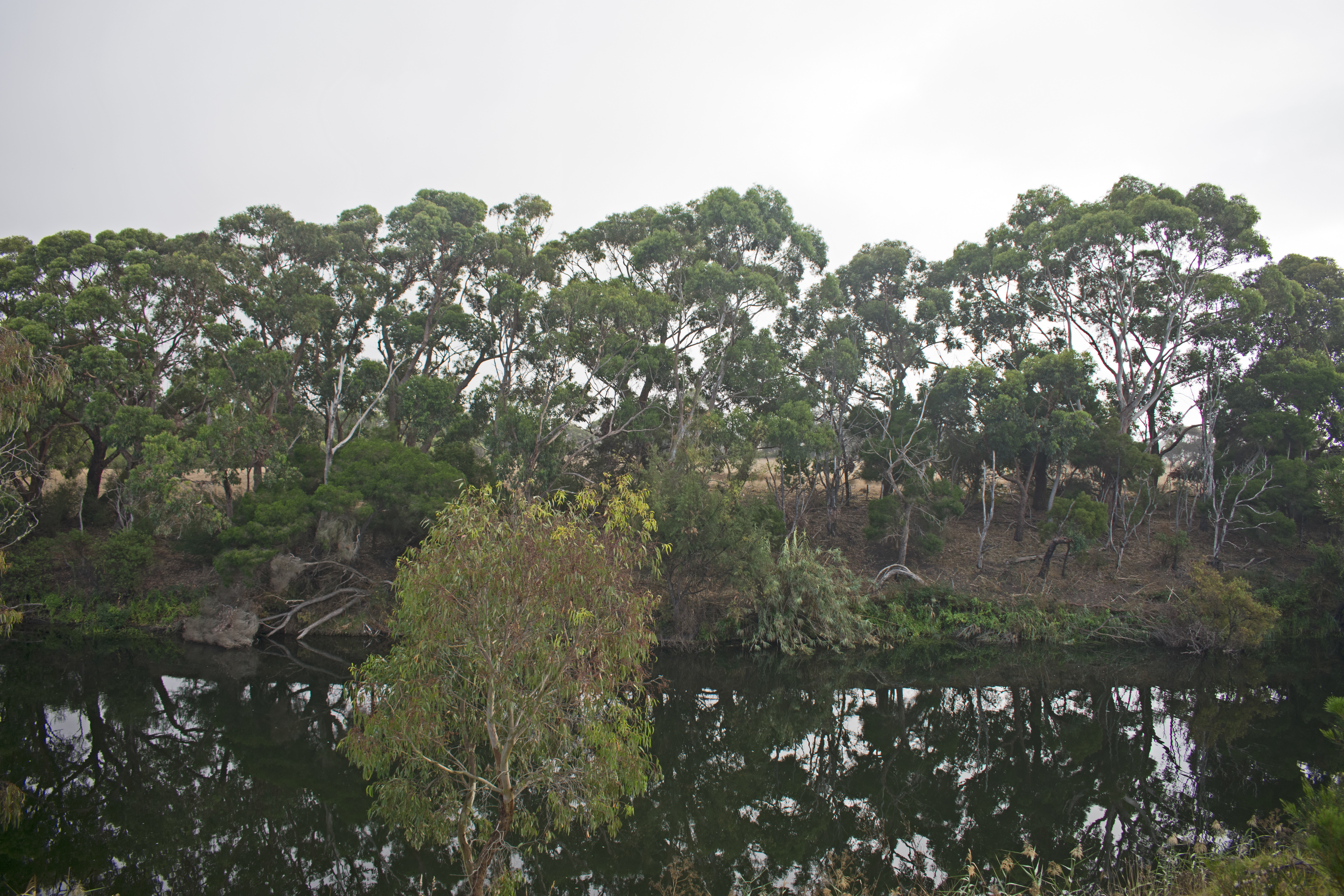
Hopkins River seen from Hopkins River Lookout, Allansford

The Hopkins River rises below Telegraph Hill near Ararat, and flows generally south, joined by twelve tributaries including the Mount Emu Creek, before reaching its mouth and emptying into Bass Strait at Warrnambool. The river descends 338 metres (1,109 ft) over its 271-kilometre (168 mi) course. The river and its tributaries drain much of Lake Bolac; and north of Allansford the river descends over the 11–13-metre (36–43 ft) Hopkins Falls.

Together with the Merri River, the Hopkins flows through the regional centre of Warrnambool; and the river passes by the end of the Great Ocean Road near Allansford.

== River health ==
The Hopkins River is in extremely poor health with less than 5% of the river having natural bush and vegetation.

== Re-vegetation ==
The Hopkins River Re-vegetation Project (HRRP) was commenced in 2016 by the Ellerslie Residents Group Inc.

=== Phase 1 ===
Phase 1 of the HRRP project commenced in 2016 in Ellerslie. The Project is located between the Hopkins Highway bridge and the historic bridge.

=== Phase 2 & 3 ===
Phases 2 & 3 of the project are planned to take place on the eastern bank between the phase 1 site and the Stony Creek Junction.

== Etymology ==
The river was named in 1836 by Major Thomas Mitchell after a friend, Sir John Paul Hopkins.
