= Lake Bullen Merri =

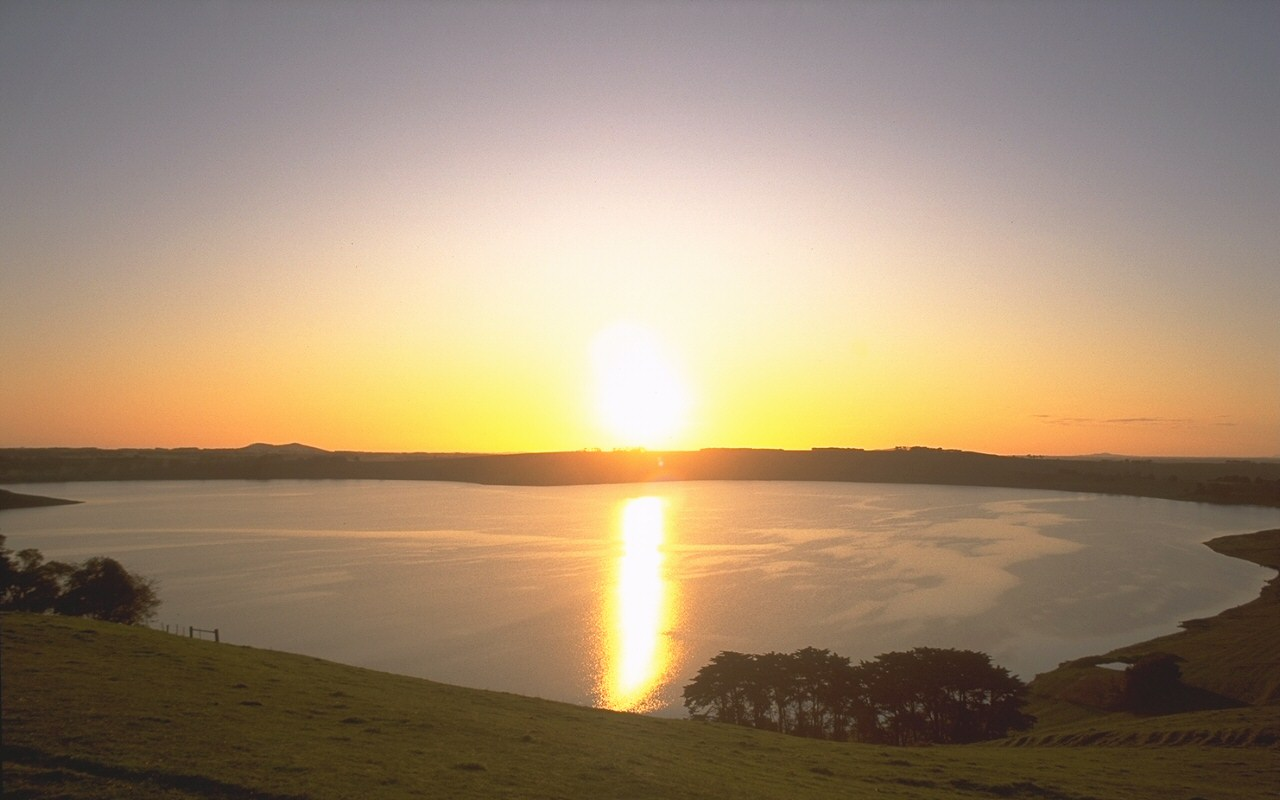
- Lake Bullen Merri at sunset

- Location in Victoria
- Location: Southwest Victoria
- Coordinates: 38°15′06″S 143°06′15″E
- Type: Brackish crater lake
- Basin countries: Australia
- Average depth: 60 m (200 ft)
- Max. depth: 66 m (217 ft)

Lake Bullen Merri and its smaller northern neighbour Lake Gnotuk are a pair of crater lakes near Camperdown in south western Victoria, Australia.

Lake Bullen Merri has brackish water quality whereas Lake Gnotuk is hypersaline (twice as salty as seawater).

== Lake Bullen Merri ==
Lake Bullen Merri has a maximum depth of 66 m (217 ft), with a cloverleaf outline indicating that it was probably formed by two overlapping maar volcanoes. The lake is depicted in work by Eugene von Guerard. The edge of the lake was marked by a stone in the late 1800s by James Dawson; from this and von Guerard's painting, it can be deduced that the level of the lake has dropped considerably in the last 100 years. On the south side of the lake there is a yacht club and toilets. There is a boat ramp available.

== Lake Gnotuk ==
The smaller lake to the north of Lake Bullen Merri has a maximum depth of 20 m (66 ft). The two lakes are linked by an overflow channel in the common wall at an elevation of 175 m. There is a 19th-century record of water from Bullen Merri overflowing into Gnotuk.

The crater is 2 km across and although the lakes have the same level of their lake-beds, the level of water is lower in Gnotuk. Lake shore terraces indicate previous higher levels and lake floor sediments and fossils show a record of past fluctuations in salinity, water level and climate.

There is no direct public access to the lake.

On the low-lying land between the two lakes is Camperdown's major sporting complex. There is an 18-hole golf course, two cricket ovals (one with a turf pitch), an extensive equestrian course, tennis courts and a bowling green.

== See also ==
- List of lakes of Australia § Victoria
- List of volcanoes in Australia § Victoria
