= James Dawson (activist) =

James Dawson (5 July 1806 – 19 April 1900) was a prominent champion of Aboriginal interests. He was born at Bonnytoun, Linlithgow, Scotland, the son of a whisky distiller. He arrived in Hobsons Bay, Port Phillip, Australia on 2 May 1840 with his wife Joan Anderson Park, niece of Mungo Park. He tried dairy farming in the Yarra valley for a time but moved to broader pastures in the Port Fairy district in 1844. For the next 22 years Dawson was in partnership in a cattle and sheep station, "Cox's Heifer Station" later named Kangatong, some 10 miles east of Macarthur.

In 1866 he left the district and settled for a while near Melbourne, but later moved back to the Camperdown area living at Wuurung Farm on the edge of Lake Bullen Merri, where he became Local Guardian of the Aborigines in 1876. In 1882, he returned from a trip home to Linlithgow to find that the last survivor of the Djargurd Wurrung, Wombeetch Puyuun, had died and was buried outside the Camperdown cemetery. After an unsuccessful appeal for public support to finance a memorial in the cemetery he had a granite obelisk erected at his own expense and had Wombeetch Puyuun's remains reburied at its foot. The obelisk has two dates, 1840 and 1883, which mark the mere 43 years it took for white settlement to displace the Djargurd Wurrung from the Camperdown area.

James Dawson and his daughter, Isabella Park Taylor (1843–1929), shared a deep interest in Aboriginal civilisation. They used their years at Kangatong to study the languages and cultures of the indigenous peoples of the volcanic plains, and to which in 1881, he published the work Australian Aborigines: the languages and customs of several tribes of Aborigines in the Western District of Victoria, Australia, and a second edition in 1900. He vigorously defended Aboriginal interests against government officials, politicians, his fellow squatters and others, a crusade that he kept up until his death in 1900 at Camperdown at the age of 93.

Without his work the Djargurd Wurrung language and customs would be lost.

His scrapbook collection was donated to the State Library of Victoria in 2018, by his great, great granddaughter Susan Cole (nee Thornton).
