= Maggie of the Wando =

Massacre survivor and Jardwadjali woman who assisted in an expedition of Thomas Mitchell

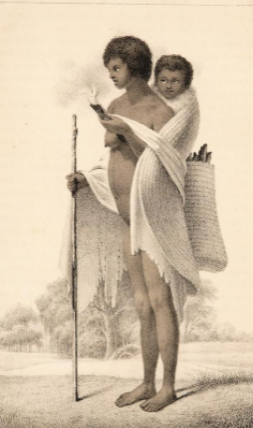
- Drawing of Maggie of the Wando and her child near the Glenelg River in 1836 by Thomas Mitchell
- Born: c.1810
- Died: 1853 (aged 42–43)

Maggie of the Wando (c.1810 – 1853) was a Jardwadjali woman from around the area now known as Casterton, Victoria in south-east Australia. She was the first of her people to encounter the explorer Thomas Mitchell, and assisted him by guiding his expedition through her country, giving him the names of geographical sites such as the Wando River and the Wannon River.

== Early life ==
Nothing is known of Maggie's early life except that she was probably born on Jardwadjali country sometime around 1810. Her traditional name is unknown and she was simply called by the British colonists as either 'Maggie' or the woman 'of the Wando'.

== Encounter with Thomas Mitchell ==
In August 1836, Mitchell with his large expedition which had set out from central New South Wales to find suitable land for colonisation, was travelling south along the upper reaches of a waterway he had named the Glenelg River.

He described the landscape as:

"an open grassy country, extending as far as we could see, the hills round and smooth as a carpet, the meadows broad and either green as an emerald or of a rich golden colour from the abundance, as we soon afterwards found, of a little ranunculus-like flower"

The flowers were the large cultivated areas of murnong used by the Indigenous people of the region as their staple source of starch.

Mitchell soon spotted a woman with her child harvesting murnong and approached her, wanting to gain knowledge of the indigenous names of the nearby localities. After the initial apprehension of seeing white men and horses for the first time, the woman (who later became known as Maggie of the Wando) became calm and was able to converse with several Wiradjuri guides that Mitchell had acquired during his journey. These guides included the woman Turandurey and the man Piper, and they were able to understand Maggie perfectly, indicating perhaps a strong similarity between the Wiradjuri language and the Jardwadjali language.

The basket-work that Maggie was using to carry firewood and murnong, as well as her kangaroo fur lined reed mats that supported her child on her back attracted interest as they had not been encountered before by either the British or the Wiradjuri explorers.

Maggie then guided Mitchell along the Glenelg River which she named as the Temiangandgeen or Nangeela, and then on to the Wando River where she parted from Mitchell's expedition as he headed to the Wannon River.

== Surviving British colonisation ==
Four years later, in 1840, British colonists arrived in a rapid wave to take up the "delightful" land described by Mitchell for the grazing of sheep and cattle. Scottish pastoralist John Robertson took up Wando Vale station, where he met Maggie fishing for freshwater mussels in a waterhole.

The Whyte brothers also established a sheep station upon Jardwadjali land near Wando Vale which was named Konongwootong. Within weeks, the brothers conducted a large punitive expedition against the Jardwadjali people after the taking of some sheep. They cornered a group of the local people in some scrub and proceeded to massacre around 50 Jardwadjali men at a place later called Fighting Hills. Some records say the women and children were chased away, while others state a number were killed during the massacre.

Nearly all of Maggie's male relatives were killed during this massacre. Maggie survived but it is unclear if the male child she was observed carrying during the earlier encounter with Mitchell was killed or not.

Throughout the earlier 1840s, the Jardwadjali people suffered further massacres at the hands of colonists and the Native Police. However, Maggie managed to survive this period of genocide.

== Death and legacy ==
Maggie died in 1853 at an unknown location in the Wando River district. She was around 43 years of age upon her death and had suffered terribly from rheumatism prior to her passing.

A portrait of Maggie and her infant son drawn by Thomas Mitchell was published in his book Three Expeditions into the interior of Eastern Australia.

== See also ==
- List of Indigenous Australian historical figures
