= James Whyte (Australian politician) =

Australian politician (1820–1882)

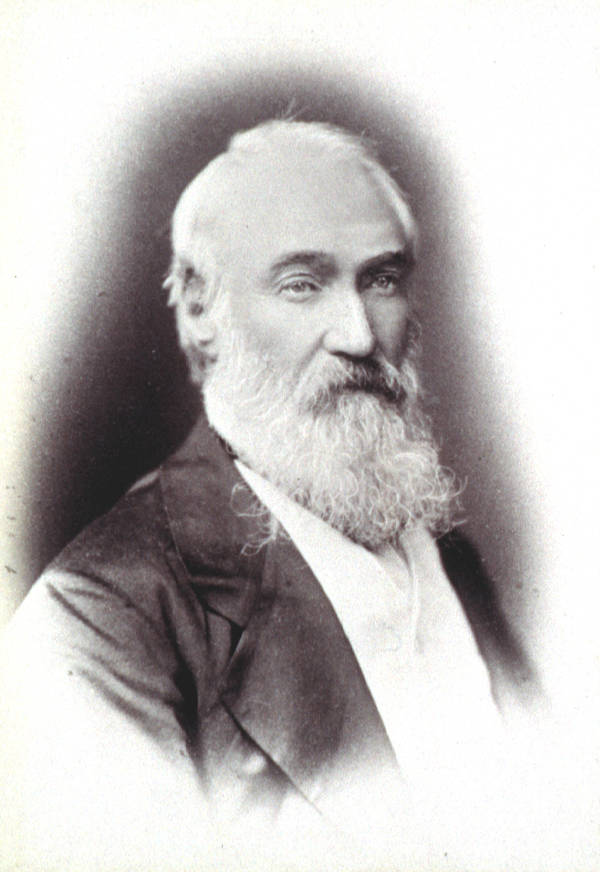

6th Premier of Tasmania
- In office 20 January 1863 – 24 November 1866
- Preceded by: Thomas Chapman
- Succeeded by: Sir Richard Dry
- Constituency: Pembroke

Personal details
- Born: 30 March 1820 Greenlaw, Scotland, UK
- Died: 20 August 1882 (aged 62) Hobart, Tasmania
- Spouse(s): Sarah Wilkinson (1852); Elizabeth Gregson (1856-1865); Elizabeth Coverdale (1868-1882)
- Children: James Wilkinson Whyte

James Whyte (30 March 1820 – 20 August 1882) was a Scottish-born Australian politician who served as the sixth Premier of Tasmania, from 20 January 1863 to 24 November 1866. Before moving to Tasmania, Whyte was a pioneering sheep-farmer in western Victoria. He and his brothers perpetrated the Fighting Hills massacre of 40–80 Aboriginal people in Victoria while recovering stolen sheep.

== Early life ==
James Whyte was born near Greenlaw, Berwickshire, in the Scottish Borders, the son of George Whyte (died 1836), a captain in the yeomanry, and his wife Jessie (née Walker).

The family emigrated to Van Diemen's Land (now Tasmania) in 1832, and as a young man Whyte was a pioneer sheep-farmer in Victoria's western district with his brothers, managing the approximately 57,000 acre Kononwotong sheep run near present-day Coleraine, Victoria.

James later gained wealth from the discovery of gold at a property at Clunes, Victoria, in which he was a partner. It was developed into the Port Phillip Gold Mine. He returned to Tasmania in 1853.

Whyte and his brothers are recognised as pioneers of Coleraine, Victoria, and the town's main street is named after them.

== Aboriginal massacres ==
In 1840 James, his brothers and their convict servants perpetrated the Fighting Hills massacre – their party killing between 40 and 80 Jardwadjali Aboriginal people while recovering stolen sheep. The party suffered no deaths despite furious resistance by the Aboriginal people. One of the coloniser's party was speared. The Jardwajali people fled in a moment of confusion after one of the attackers died in friendly fire.

A month later stockmen from the Whyte brothers' station were involved in another massacre of up to 60 Jardwadjali people, the Fighting Waterholes massacre.

His obituary later understated these incident saying:

"The difficulties with the savage aborigines were very great, and had to be overcome."

In 1845, the Konongwootong sheep run was divided - James took 8,000 acres of land, and named the run Koroite.

== Political career ==
Having failed to win a seat in 1854, Whyte was elected to the Legislative Council for Pembroke in 1856. After serving briefly as a minister under the premiership of Thomas Gregson and serving as chairman of several council committees, he became premier and colonial secretary on 20 January 1863. His government engaged in road and rail development, in public service reform, and in fiscal reform including an unpopular proposal for a property and income tax which was to cause its downfall in November 1866. In 1869–70 he was involved in framing laws to prevent the spread of scab disease in sheep, and was chief inspector of sheep from 1870 until 1882. He continued as an active member of committees until 1875, retiring from parliament in 1876.

== Other works ==
Whyte was an active and philanthropic Presbyterian Christian, a fellow of the Royal Society of Tasmania, and an original proprietor of the Tasmanian Daily News (incorporated with the Hobart Town Daily Mercury in 1858). He was married three times:

- in January 1852 to Sarah Wilkinson (died in childbirth, November 1852)
- in May 1857 to Elizabeth Gregson, elder daughter of Thomas Gregson (died 1865)
- in June 1868 to Elizabeth Coverdale, daughter of Dr John Coverdale, superintendent of an orphanage at New Town

Whyte died in Hobart in 1882, leaving one son, James Wilkinson Whyte who later was the Tasmanian Recorder of Titles.

Political offices
Preceded by Thomas Chapman	Premier of Tasmania; 1863 – 1866	Succeeded by Richard Dry
