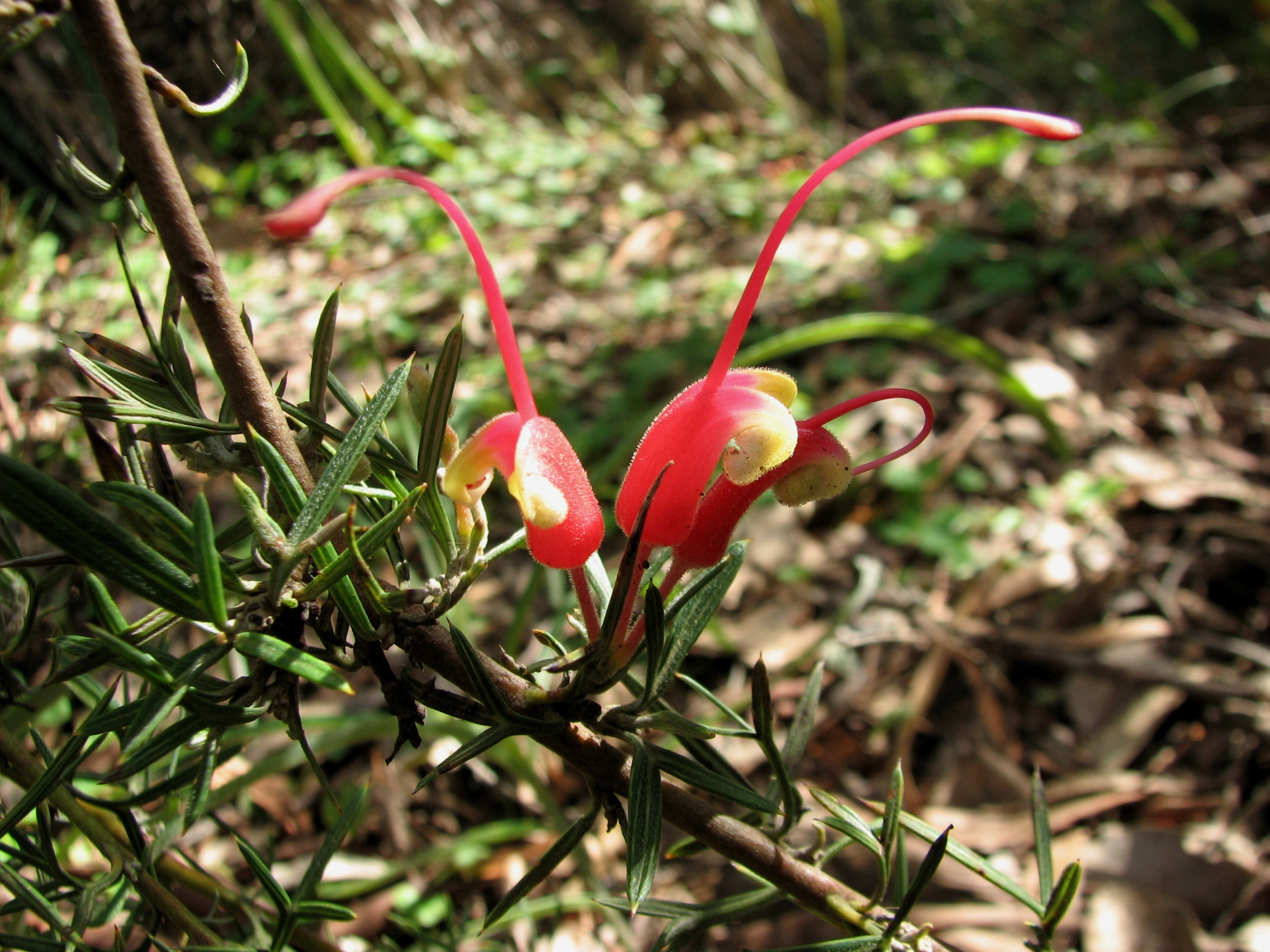

Conservation status
- Priority Three — Poorly Known Taxa (DEC)

Scientific classification
- Kingdom: Plantae
- Clade: Tracheophytes
- Clade: Angiosperms
- Clade: Eudicots
- Order: Proteales
- Family: Proteaceae
- Genus: Grevillea
- Species: G. newbeyi

Binomial name
- Grevillea newbeyi McGill.

= Grevillea newbeyi =

Species of shrub endemic to Western Australia

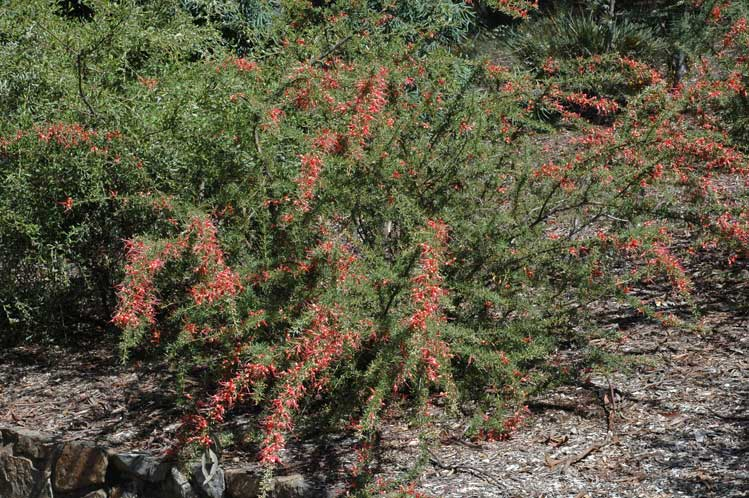
Habit in the Australian National Botanic Gardens

Grevillea newbeyi is a species of flowering plant in the family Proteaceae and is endemic to the south west region of Western Australia. It is a dome-shaped, prickly shrub with divided leaves, the end lobes linear, rigid and sharply-pointed, and clusters of smoky pink and creamy-white flowers with a pink style.

== Description ==
Grevillea newbeyi is a dome-shaped, prickly shrub that typically grows to 1.0–1.5 m (3 ft 3 in – 4 ft 11 in) high and 2–3 m (6 ft 7 in – 9 ft 10 in) wide and often forms suckers. The leaves are 10–35 mm (0.39–1.38 in) long and pinnatisect, the lobes sometimes further divided, the end lobes linear, 4–25 mm (0.16–0.98 in) long, 0.8–1.4 mm (0.031–0.055 in) wide with the edges rolled under, and sharply pointed. The flowers are arranged in loose groups of up to six on the ends of branches on an elongated peduncle, the rachis 3–5 mm (0.12–0.20 in) long. The flowers are smoky pink and creamy-white with a pink, black-tipped style, the pistil 39–48 mm (1.5–1.9 in) long. Flowering occurs from June to November and the fruit is an erect follicle 11–14 mm (0.43–0.55 in) long.

It is similar in appearance to G. patentiloba and G. tripartita.

== Taxonomy ==
Grevillea newbeyi was first formally described in 1986 by Donald McGillivray in his book New Names in Grevillea (Proteaceae). The specific epithet (newbeyi) honours Kenneth Newbey.

== Distribution and habitat ==
This grevillea grows in shrubland and heath between Kukerin, Ongerup and Newdegate in the Avon Wheatbelt and Mallee bioregions of south-western Western Australia.

== Conservation status ==
Grevillea newbeyi is listed as "Priority Three" by the Government of Western Australia Department of Biodiversity, Conservation and Attractions, meaning that it is poorly known and known from only a few locations but is not under imminent threat.
