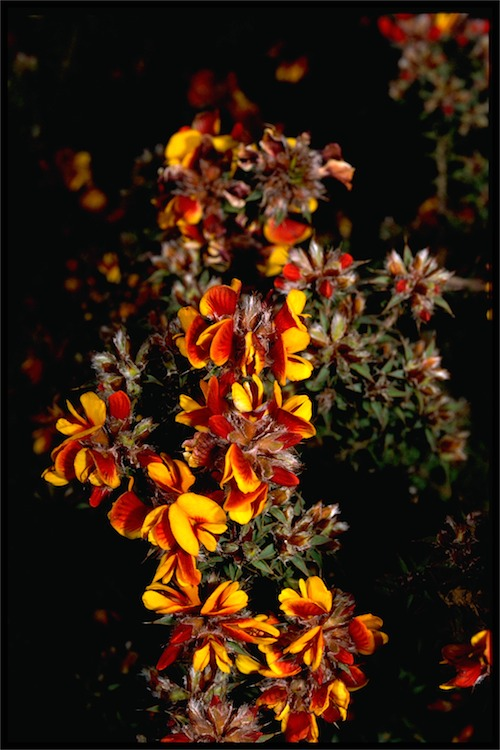
- In the Grampians National Park

Scientific classification
- Kingdom: Plantae
- Clade: Tracheophytes
- Clade: Angiosperms
- Clade: Eudicots
- Clade: Rosids
- Order: Fabales
- Family: Fabaceae
- Subfamily: Faboideae
- Genus: Pultenaea
- Species: P. costata

Binomial name
- Pultenaea costata H.B.Will.

= Pultenaea costata =

Ribbed bush-pea

Species of flowering plant

Pultenaea costata, commonly known as ribbed bush-pea, is a species of flowering plant in the family Fabaceae and is endemic to the Grampians National Park in Victoria. It is a spreading shrub with egg-shaped to lance-shaped leaves, and dense clusters of pea-like flowers.

== Description ==
Pultenaea costata is a spreading shrub that typically grows to a height of up to 1 m (3 ft 3 in) and has stems that are hairy when young. The leaves are egg-shaped to lance-shaped, 7–15 mm (0.28–0.59 in) long and 2–5 mm (0.079–0.197 in) wide tapering to a sharp, down-curved point and with dark brown stipules about 7 mm (0.28 in) long at the base. The flowers are arranged in dense clusters of five to eight surrounded by bracts about 8 mm (0.31 in) long with two points on the tip. Bracteoles about 8 mm (0.31 in) long are attached to the base of the sepal tube. The sepals are about 9 mm (0.35 in) long and joined at the base, the lobes hairy. The standard petal is 13–15 mm (0.51–0.59 in) wide and the ovary is covered with long hairs. The fruit is a pod surrounded by the remains of the sepals.

== Taxonomy and naming ==
Pultenaea costata was first formally described in 1921 by Herbert Bennett Williamson in the Proceedings of the Royal Society of Victoria from specimens collected near Mount William. The specific epithet (costata) means "ribbed".

== Distribution and habitat ==
This pultenaea grows on the higher parts of the northern ranges of the Grampians in central western Victoria.
