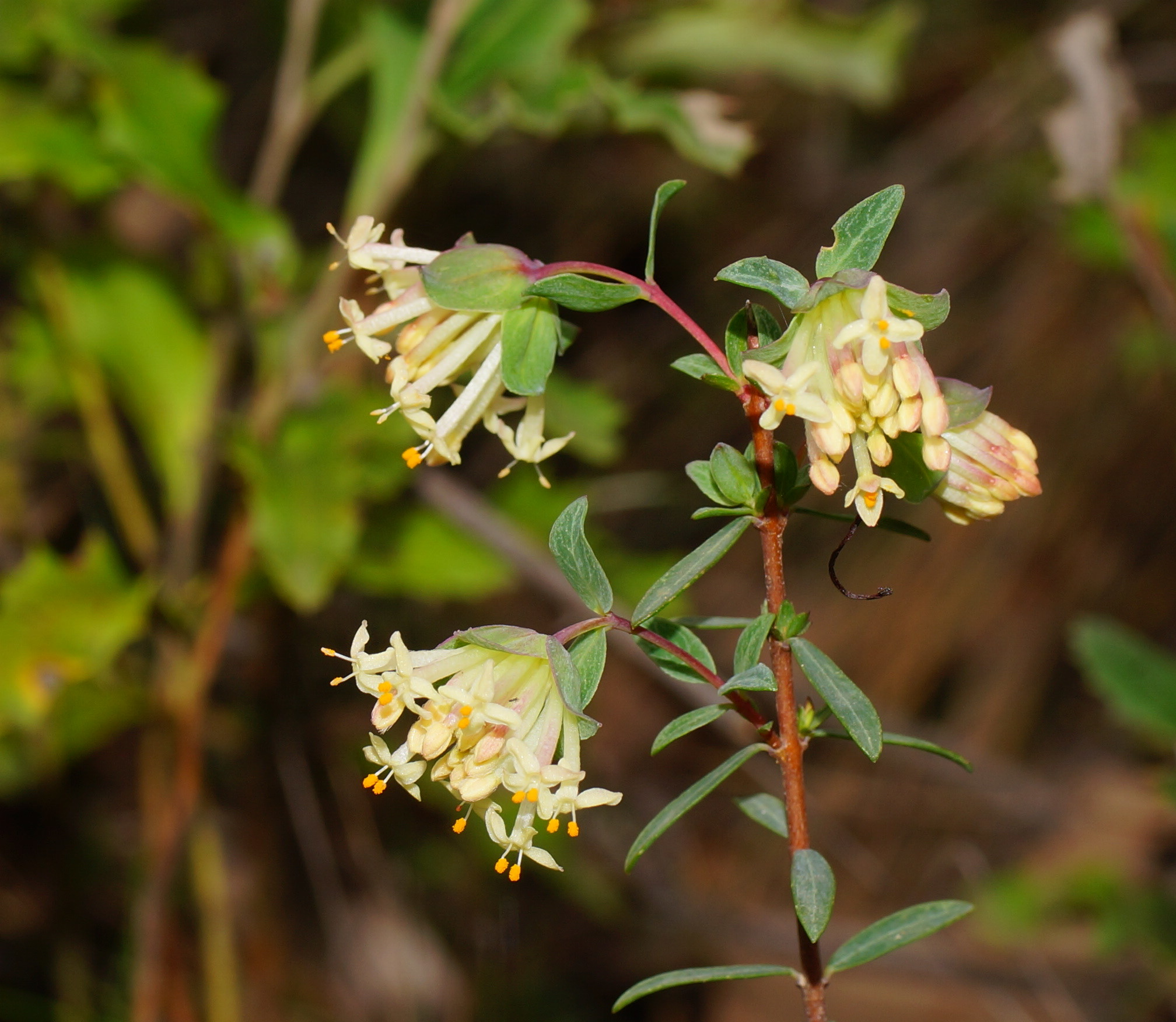
- In Grampians National Park

Conservation status
- Vulnerable (EPBC Act)

Scientific classification
- Kingdom: Plantae
- Clade: Tracheophytes
- Clade: Angiosperms
- Clade: Eudicots
- Clade: Rosids
- Order: Malvales
- Family: Thymelaeaceae
- Genus: Pimelea
- Species: P. pagophila

Binomial name
- Pimelea pagophila Rye

= Pimelea pagophila =

Grampians rice-flower

Species of shrub

Pimelea pagophila, commonly known as Grampians rice-flower, is a species of shrub in the family Thymelaeaceae. It has a restricted distribution, white flowers in spherical heads at the end of branches, green leaves arranged in opposite pairs and is endemic to Victoria, Australia.

== Description ==
Pimelea pagophila is a small shrub 0.3–1.2 m (1 ft 0 in – 3 ft 11 in) high with smooth stems and prominent leaf nodes. The mid green leaves are arranged in opposite pairs along the branches and are narrowly egg-shaped to elliptic, 7–20 mm (0.28–0.79 in) long, 2–5 mm (0.079–0.197 in) wide, smooth and mostly paler on the underside. The inflorescence is a pendulous spherical head containing numerous individual flowers. The 4, 6 or 8 overlapping flower bracts are sessile, elliptic or egg-shaped, 10–17 mm (0.39–0.67 in) long, 6–9 mm (0.24–0.35 in) wide, thin, smooth, light green or yellow-green, occasionally a reddish colour. The white flowers are bisexual, the floral tube 14–15 mm (0.55–0.59 in) long and smooth on the outside, hairy inside, the style longer than the floral tube. The sepals are spreading, about 4 mm (0.16 in) long, and smooth on the inside. Flowering occurs from October to November.

== Taxonomy and naming ==
Pimelea pagophila was first formally described in 1990 by Barbara Lynette Rye and the description was published in the Flora of Australia. The specific epithet (pagophila) is from pago meaning "hill or mountain" and philea meaning "to love" with reference to the habitat of the species.

== Distribution ==
Grampians rice-flower has a restricted distribution and it is endemic to Mount William located within the Grampians National Park, Victoria.

== Conservation status ==
Pimelea pagophila is considered "vulnerable" under the Environment Protection and Biodiversity Conservation Act 1999.
