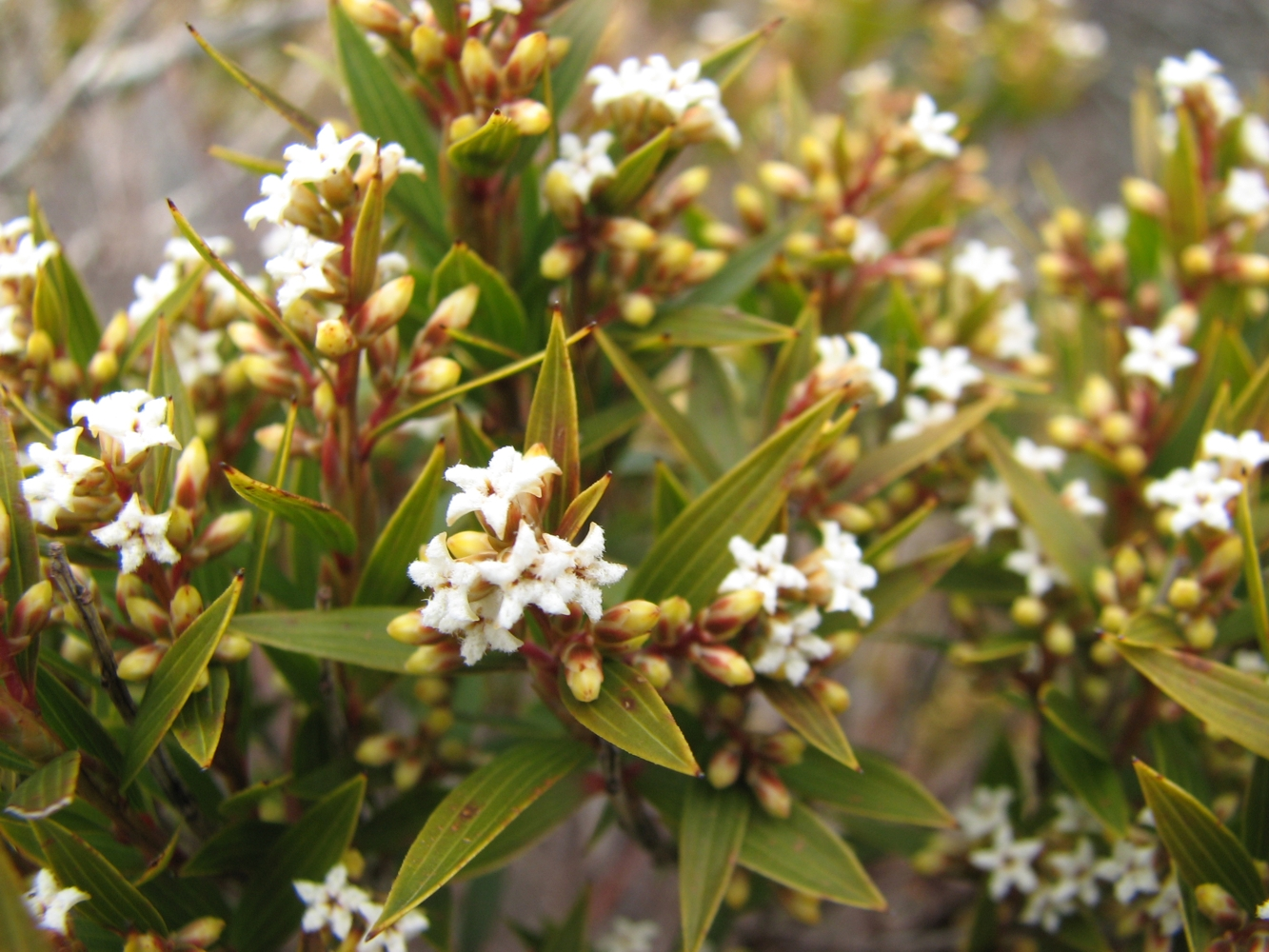
- In Grampians National Park

Scientific classification
- Kingdom: Plantae
- Clade: Tracheophytes
- Clade: Angiosperms
- Clade: Eudicots
- Clade: Asterids
- Order: Ericales
- Family: Ericaceae
- Genus: Leucopogon
- Species: L. neurophyllus

Binomial name
- Leucopogon neurophyllus F.Muell.
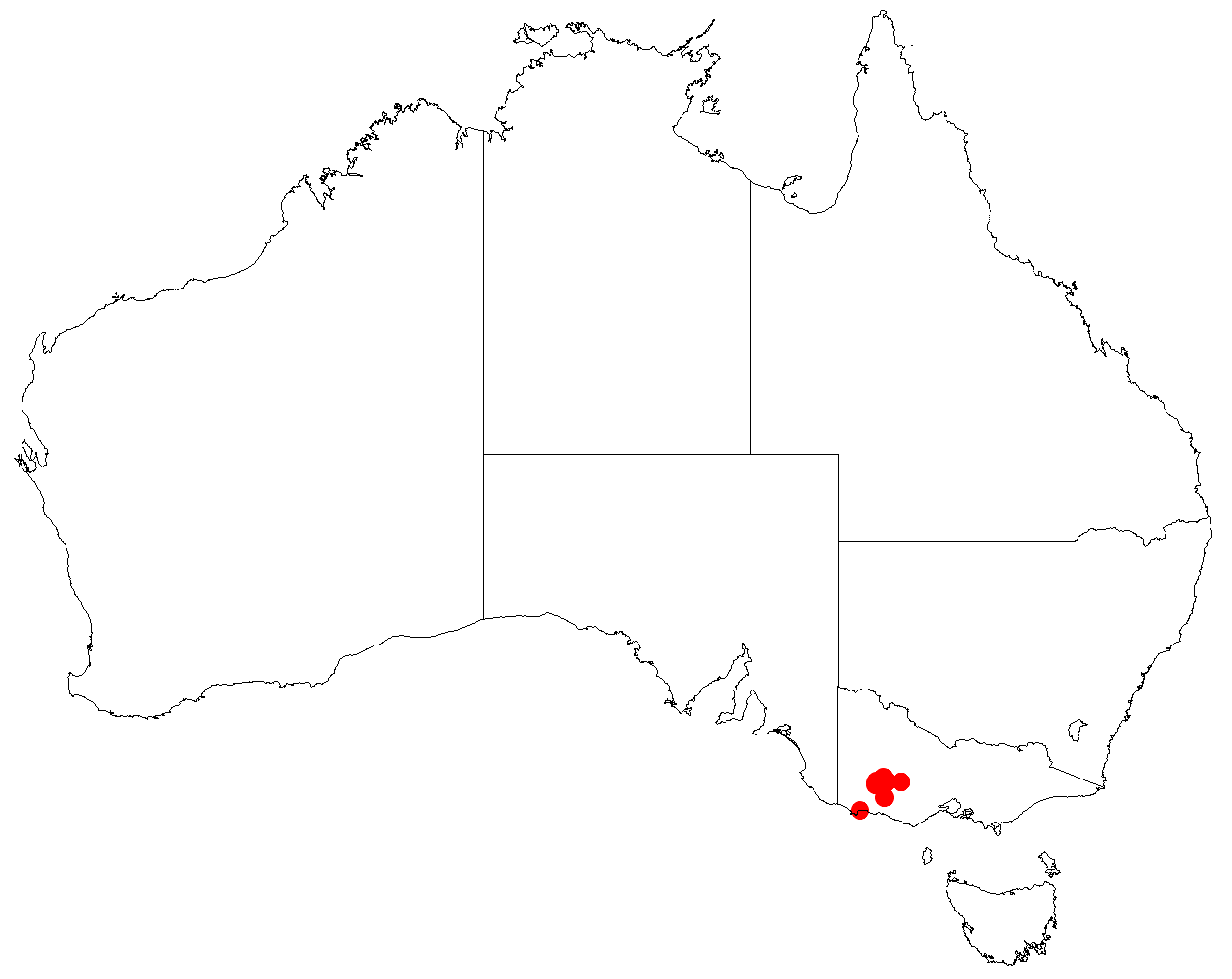
- Occurrence data from AVH

Synonyms
- Leucopogon lanceolatus var. alpestris Benth.; Leucopogon neurophyllus F.Muell. nom. inval., nom. nud.; Styphelia neurophylla (F.Muell.) J.H.Willis

= Leucopogon neurophyllus =

Species of shrub

Leucopogon neurophyllus, commonly known as veined beard-heath, is a species of flowering plant in the heath family Ericaceae and is endemic to Victoria in Australia. It is a dense shrub with many branches, erect, narrowly elliptic leaves, and white, tube-shaped flowers that are densely bearded inside.

== Description ==
Leucopogon neurophyllus is a dense shrub that typically grows to a height of up to about 2 m (6 ft 7 in), its many branchlets glabrous. The leaves are erect, narrowly elliptic, 12–45 mm (0.47–1.77 in) long and 2–8 mm (0.079–0.315 in) wide and glabrous with 3 to 7 translucent, parallel veins. The flowers are erect and arranged in groups of 3 to 11 on the ends of branches and in upper leaf axils with egg-shaped bracteoles 0.9–1.8 mm (0.035–0.071 in) long at the base. The sepals are egg-shaped, 1.6–3.2 mm (0.063–0.126 in) long, the petals white and 3–4 mm (0.12–0.16 in) long with lobes about the same length as the petal tube, and densely bearded inside. Flowering occurs from September to January and the fruit is a spherical or oval drupe about 2.5 mm (0.098 in) long.

== Taxonomy ==
Leucopogon neurophyllus was first formally described in 1858 by Victorian Government Botanist Ferdinand von Mueller in his Fragmenta Phytographiae Australiae, based on plant material collected at Mount William in the Grampians. The specific epithet (neurophyllus) means "nerve-leaved".

== Distribution and habitat ==
Veined beard-heath is only found in the higher parts of the Grampians National Park and nearby peaks, where it grows in forest and rocky shrubland.
