= Djab Wurrung people =

Aboriginal Australian people of present-day Victoria

Djab Wurrung
Regions with significant populations

Languages
- Djab Wurrung, English

Religion
- Australian Aboriginal mythology

Related ethnic groups
- Dja Dja Wurrung, Jardwadjali, Dhauwurd Wurrung and Wada wurrung see List of Indigenous Australian group names

The Djab Wurrung, also spelt Djabwurrung, Tjapwurrung, Tjap Wurrung, or Djapwarrung, people are Aboriginal Australians whose country is the volcanic plains of central Victoria from the Mount William Range of Gariwerd in the west to the Pyrenees range in the east encompassing the Wimmera River flowing north and the headwaters of the Hopkins River flowing south. The towns of Ararat, Stawell and Hamilton are within their territory. There were 41 Djab Wurrung clans who formed an alliance with the neighbouring Jardwadjali people through intermarriage, shared culture, trade and moiety system before colonisation. Their lands were conquered but never ceded. Their ancestors may have occupied their lands for up to 40,000 years. They lived in permanent or semi-permanent villages and practised aquaculture and fire-based land management.

== Language ==
Djab Wurrung, meaning "soft language", belongs to the Western branch of the Kulin languages. It is the southernmost language, with Dja Dja Wurrung spoken to the east/southeast, and Jardwadjali (thought to be a dialect of Wemba Wemba language) spoken in the area from Casterton northwards to Donald.

The Djab Wurrung language shares 85 per cent common vocabulary with Jardwadjali, 82 per cent with Wemba Wemba, 66 per cent with Madhi Madhi and 68 per cent with Letji-Letji.

It is believed that the northern Djab Wurrung dialect Knenknen Wurrung was spoken by a distinct group which "occupied a tract of country from east of the Pyrenees and west across northern Gariwerd" before Knenknen wurrung speakers and their country were absorbed into Djab Wurrung territory sometime in the early nineteenth century.

The Tjapwuring word mihirung paringmal ("giant bird") has become the vernacular for dromornithids.

== Country ==
The anthropologist Norman Tindale observed that the Djab Wurrung's lands extend over 2,700 square miles (7,000 km^{2}), ranging from Mount Rouse westwards to Hamilton. To the east its boundaries end at the Hopkins River and Wickliffe. The northern boundary lays near Mount William, Stawell, Ararat and the Dividing Range.

Parts of Djab Wurrung country include the eastern ranges of Gariwerd and the Grampians National Park. Historian Benjamin Wilkie writes that Gariwerd has been central to Djab Wurrung society and culture, and that their territory extends

from the Serra Range onto the plains to the south and east of the Gariwerd mountains. Along the Serra Range, the Neetsheere balug lived at Mount William, and the Watteneer balug, Yam yam burer balug, Weeripcart balug, Mitteyer balug were nearby. At Mud-dadjug (Mount Abrupt) were a group described as the "Mutterchoke gundij" and at Wurgarri, or Mount Sturgeon, near Dunkeld, were the Wurcurri gundij. Djab wurrung country extended south where the Kolorer gundij lived at Mount Rouse and at Hexham were the Buller buller cote gundij. In the west were the Beeripmo balug at Mount Cole, down to the Bulukbar at Lake Bolac. Back towards Gariwerd, Stawell, Great Western, Ararat, and Halls Gap all fell within Djab wurrung country.

Djab Wurrung country also overlaps with parts of the Newer Volcanics Province of south-east Australia. Along with Girai wurrung, Wada wurrung, Gunditjmara, and other western Kulin Aboriginal people, the Djab Wurrung people have oral traditions relating to volcanoes and volcanism. Mount Rouse, near Penshurst, for example, is an ancient volcano on Djab Wurrung country where the Kolorer gundidj clan lived. The Djab Wurrung name for Mount Rouse is Kolorer, which means "lava". Kolorer, kuulor, Kulurr and other derivatives can be found attached to volcanic landscape features across the region.

== Society and culture ==
The Djab Wurrung were once thought to have had at least eleven bands. Now it is believed that at the time of European contact in the middle of the nineteenth century, there were around 41 clans, bands, or local estate groups. These groups shared the Djab Wurrung language but belonged to their own, smaller tracts of land. Each of these groups had a population of about 40 to 60 people. At the time of European colonisation the total Djab Wurrung population is estimated to have been somewhere between 2460 and 4920 individuals.

At the time of colonisation, the Djab Wurrung language was passed down through fathers, as was an individual clan or local estate group territorial affiliation. Further to this, Ian D. Clark notes that a two class matrilineal system was recorded and maintained, with descent based on the wirran (yellow-tailed black cockatoo) and grugidj (sulphur-crested cockatoo or Long-billed corella white cockatoo) moieties. Grugidj sub-totems included pelican, parrot, mopoke and large kangaroo. Gamadj sub-totems included emu, whip snake, possum, koala, and sparrowhawk. Clans intermarried with the Dja Dja Wurrung, Jardwadjali, Dhauwurd wurrung and Wada wurrung peoples.

Anthropologist Ray Madden has argued that matrilineal social and cultural affiliations became more significant after patrilineal territorial and linguistic affiliations were disrupted by European colonisation and Djab Wurrung people were alienated from their country and language. The effect of this has been an increased emphasis on family relationships, broader landscape connections, and a greater significance for senior women in Djab Wurrung and other western Victorian Aboriginal communities.

Overall, Wilkie says that in Djab Wurrung society, "These forms of social organisation ... transcended the local territory, connecting different 'clan' and language groups to others in the wider nation, and enabling people from different language groups and local estates to come together, for example, as seasonal hunting bands." He argues that "this way of organising society and culture linked individuals materially and spiritually to the land, but also to their families and local and regional communities."

=== Trading networks ===
Affiliation and co-operation with other western Victorian Aboriginal communities meant that Djab Wurrung people could make the best use of natural resources across the region. Research suggests that the social organisation of Djab Wurrung people was "underlaid by economic considerations. Goods of all kinds were exchanged between individuals and groups so that the diverse resources of south-east Australia could be redistributed as they were needed ... economic motivations – access to natural resources – underpinned much social organising between western Victorian Aboriginal groups, it was also the case that the efficient and continued operation of these systems was reliant on the highly specialised knowledge of local ecosystems possessed by different estate and language groups across the region." Trade included eels, but also many other resources.

=== Bunjil's Shelter ===
The creator deity or ancestral being known as Bunjil is significant in Djab Wurrung culture. Over 90 per cent of Aboriginal rock art in Victoria can be found on Djab Wurrung and Jardwadjali country, especially in the Grampians National Park. One of the most significant rock art sites in south-eastern Australia is Bunjil's Shelter on Djab Wurrung country in the Black Range Scenic Reserve, not far from Stawell. In the nineteenth century, Europeans knew of the site but few had seen it. Its location was made public in 1957. In the following decades, the distinctiveness in the artistic style at the site, as well as discrepancies in older European descriptions of Bunjil's Shelter, led to speculation that the artwork was European, not Djab Wurrung, in origins. The site was struck off the Victorian Archaeological Survey register by 1980, but was later reinstated when chemical analysis confirmed that the rock art had, in fact, been painted with traditional Aboriginal ochres; the analysis found that parts of the painting had been traced over with European whitewash and red lead paint.

=== Burial rites ===
Some of the Djab Wurrung clans are thought to have practised burial of their dead in trees. According to Hyett there have been two recent discoveries to the west of Ararat of secondary tree burials, involving the re-interment of two or more individuals, and a primary interment of a child in a hollow tree in the vicinity of Stawell.

== Land management and ecological knowledge ==
=== Settlements ===
Effective land management and reliable natural resources meant that permanent or semi-permanent villages made up of substantial huts were common on Djab Wurrung country, especially near creeks, streams, and on the verges of swamps. They were occupied as subsistence and seasonality dictated. Major Thomas Mitchell encountered huts of this kind near Mount Napier in 1836:

Two very substantial huts showed that even the natives had been attracted by the beauty of the land, and as the day was showery, I wished to return if possible, to pass the night there, for I began to learn that such huts, with a good fire between them, made comfortable quarters in bad weather.

In 1841, south of Mount William, George Augustus Robinson described seeing many abandoned mounds that were once the base of enclosed huts, which he described as being "large, some 15 feet in diameter." North of Mount William, Robinson saw more such structures which were "the largest [he] had seen: the one I measured was 31 yards long, two yards high, and 19 yards broad." (Note: G. A. R. Robinson quoted in Wilkie 2020, p. 31)

In 1853, in a letter to Charles La Trobe, the pastoralist Charles Browning Hall reported that there were, on his land north-east of Mount William, numerous "old mia-mias [huts] where the earth around was strewed with the balls formed in the mouth when chewing the farinaceous matter out of the bulrush root."

=== Aquaculture ===
Aquaculture was significant in Djab Wurrung life. Wilkie writes that Djab Wurrung knowledge of "the seasons and their cycles underpinned farming, hunting, and plant food cultivation. As with other Indigenous groups in the western parts of Victoria, [Djab Wurrung people] were perhaps some of the first humans to practise aquaculture. Fish traps and weirs across rivers were a common sight in the region." The pastoralist Charles Browning Hall wrote in 1853 that

About the Grampians [fish weirs] were numerous at the time of my residence, and had apparently been much more so, judging from the traces left by them in the swampy margins of the river. At these places we found many low sod banks extending across the shallow branches of the river, with apertures at intervals, in which were placed long, narrow, circular nets (like a large stocking) made of rush-work.

Clark notes that during early Autumn there were large gatherings of up to 1,000 people for one to two months hosted at the Mount William swamp or at Lake Bolac for the annual eel migration. Near Mount William, an elaborate network of channels, weirs and eel traps and stone shelters had been constructed, indicative of a semi-permanent lifestyle in which eels were an important economic component for food and bartering, particularly the Short-finned eel. Near Lake Bolac a semi-permanent village extended some 35 kilometres (22 mi) along the river bank during autumn. George Augustus Robinson on 7 July 1841 described some of the infrastructure that had been constructed near Mount William:

...an area of at least 15 acres [6.1 ha] was thus traced out... These works must have been executed at great cost of labour... There must have been some thousands of yards of this trenching and banking. The whole of the water from the mountain rivulets is made to pass through this trenching ere it reaches the marsh

In mid summer, gatherings for ceremony and hunting took place at Mirraewuae, a marsh near Hexham rich with emu and other game.

=== Fire ===
To aid the cultivation of plant foods such as Murnong, fire was used in land management: "The use of fire on selected patches of the land eradicated competitor species, fertilised the soil with ashes, and opened the area to sunlight, ensuring an abundant crop by spring. The rich pasture produced by selective burning would also attract animals for hunting. This form of land management was applied with a great deal of care." Wilkie has suggested that the Djab Wurrung burning regime was interrupted as part of a larger set of environmental transformations brought about by European colonisation, and that the disruption of Djab Wurrung land management practices has contributed to increased bushfire risks in the region.

== History ==
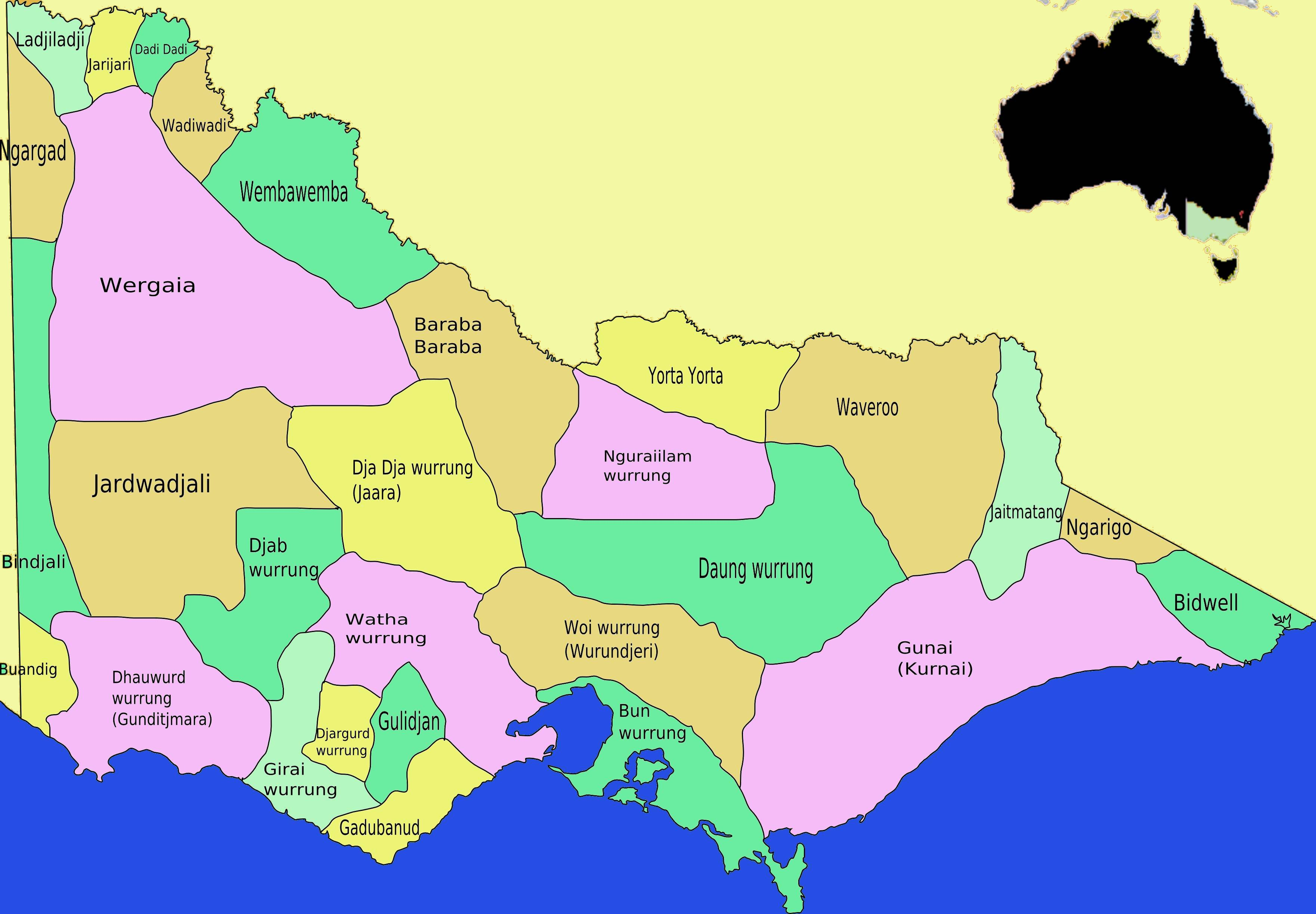
Victorian Aboriginal language territories

The ancestors of the Djab Wurrung may have occupied their lands for up to 40,000 years; the oldest known occupation site, in Gariwerd, is dated at 22,000 BP.

It is likely the Djab Wurrung were well aware of European colonisers from their communications with coastal tribes. Their first explicit contact in the written record was with Major Thomas Mitchell exploring western Victoria in September 1836 when he surprised two women of the Utoul balug and their children near Mount Cole. Two years later, in 1838, a squatter invasion began with colonials and their sheep flocks settling in Djab Wurrung country.

European Settlement from 1836 was marked by resistance to the invasion often by driving off or stealing sheep; the settlers often responded by massacring aboriginal people. From 1840 to 1859 there are reports of 35 massacres and killings of Djab Wurrung people, most occurring before the end of 1842. Very few of these reports were acted upon to bring the settlers to court.

Resistance also takes the form of maintaining connections to country and culture through whatever means available. On the Campbell brothers Mount Cole run, settled in 1840, the Beeripmo balug and Utoul balug clans were allowed to stay on the area and were actively supplied with food and clothing establishing a relationship of care and protection. The Campbell brothers discouraged white employees from visiting the out-stations further reducing possible interaction and conflict. Archeological evidence shows that the Beeripmo balug and Utoul balug maintained their connection to country, culture and food diet well into the 1860s on the property.

In 1841 Kolorer (Mount Rouse) and Burrumbeep were gazetted as Aboriginal reserves, although only the Kolorer reserve was used by Djab wurrung. In 1842 and 1843 Kolorer was used as a base to launch guerilla attacks against the increasing numbers of squatters and their sheep, then retreat to the reserve which was under the protection of the Assistant Protector of Aborigines, Charles Sievwright. Resistance to the European invasion peaked between 1840 and 1842. By 1848 all the Djab Wurrung lands had been squatted and resistance had been broken through the use of Border Police and the Native Police Corps.

By 1845 the Djab Wurrung population had dropped from a conservative pre-contact estimate of 2050 to 615. Three-quarters are estimated to have been killed by introduced diseases, poisoned flour, diseased blankets and starvation due to shortage of traditional foods, and a quarter killed by rifle attack.

During the gold rush period the Djab Wurrung saw large numbers of European and Chinese people camping on their land in search for gold, but the search for gold also attracted many station hands, and so Djab Wurrung people often found employment as station hands and in menial jobs around the stations during this period.

In the 1870s the Djab Wurrung were largely dispersed to the reservations: the Hamilton mob to Lake Condah, the Wickcliffe people to Framlingham mission, and the Mount Cole people to Framlingham and Coranderrk station.

=== Djab Wurrung football ===
It has been argued that a traditional ball-kicking aboriginal game (Note: Beveridge writes of the football used among the riverine Murray tribes such as the Dadi Dadi, Latjilatji, Jitajita, Nari-Nari, Barababaraba, Warkawarka, Watiwati, Wemba Wemba etc., that 'the women participate in this game as well as the men. I have seen as many as 200 (including both sexes) engaged in this game at one time. The ball is composed of old opossum skin tightly rolled up and covered with a fresh piece of skin firmly sewed together with opossum tail sinews; before they begin to play they arrange sides, each side having a captain, whose place it is to guide and control an oftentimes unruly squad. When all is in order a lyoor starts off with the ball in her hand; she walks a little way out from her own side and towards that of their opponents, drops the ball with seeming carelessness, but ere it has time to reach the ground she gives a dexterous and by no means a gentle kick, which being correctly aimed sends the ball into the air. Thereupon the fun begins in downright earnest...They have not any appointed goal to which the ball has to be driven; the whole of the play merely consists of keeping the ball in motion, and preventing its coming to the ground, whilst the strugglers of the game all tend to keep the ball from being captured by the opposing side. Those holding the ball throw it from one to the other of their own side, and it is whilst this is going on that the non-possessors strenuously run and jump to intercept it in its flights. As the eyes of the players are never by any chance bent on the ground, tumbles during the game are numerous and frequently ludicrous, more especially when one goes down, and so becomes a stumbling block over which a dozen or more come toppling in a heap; these incidents, however, add mirth unto the fun, without creating the least ill temper (Beveridge 1883, pp. 52–53).) such as Marn Grook had some influence on the formation of Australian rules football. Ashley Mallett suggests the form played among Wimmera tribes might have been one influence, and cites a passage from the pastoralist and aboriginal rights activist James Dawson on how the Djab Wurrung played the game, using a stitched possum skin for the football:

One of the favourite games is football, in which fifty or as many as one hundred players engage at a time. The ball is about the size of an orange, and is made of opossum-skin, with the fur side outwards...The players are divided into two sides and ranged in opposing lines, which are always of a different class-white cockatoo against black cockatoo..Each side endeavours to keep possession of the ball, which is tossed a short distance by hand, and then kicked in any direction. The side which kicks it oftenest and furtherest gains the game. The person who sends it highest is considered the best player, and has the honour of burying it in the ground until the next day.

Tom Wills family moved to a station, Lexington, near Ararat around 1840, when he was 5 years old, and he grew up often playing with the local aboriginal kids and learning the local dialect. He was influential later in introducing the "catch" and "kick" style, and in establishing and codifying Australian Rules football, although whether Marn Grook influenced the development of the game is still being debated.

== Djab Wurrung today ==
=== Gariwerd and the Grampians National Park ===
In 1989 there was a proposal by Victorian Minister for Tourism, Steve Crabb to rename many geographical place names associated with Djab Wurrung heritage in the Gariwerd – Grampians National Park area. There was much community opposition to this proposal. The Brambuk centre, representing five Aboriginal communities with historical links to the area, advocated a dual name for the main area: Gariwerd/Grampians.

Some of the changes included:

- Grampians to Gariwerd (mountain range)
- Mount Zero to Mura Mura (little hill)
- Halls Gap to Budja Budja

After a two-year consultation process, the Grampians National Park was renamed Grampians (Gariwerd) National Park in 1991, but that proved controversial and was reversed after a change of state government in 1992. The Geographic Place Names Act, 1998 (Vic) reinstated dual naming for geographical features, and this has been subsequently adopted in the park based on Jardwadjali and Djab Wurrung names for rock art sites and landscape features with the Australian National Heritage List, referring to "Grampians National Park (Gariwerd)".

The Brambuk National Park and Cultural Centre in Halls Gap is owned and managed by Jardwadjali and Djab Wurrung people from five Aboriginal communities with historic links to the Gariwerd-Grampians ranges and the surrounding plains.

=== Sacred trees and Djab Wurrung Embassy ===
In 2012 Victorian Government road authorities gained statutory approval from Martang, a Registered Aboriginal Party representing Djab Wurrung interests, for upgrade works to the Western Highway. It was later revealed that the consultation process had been limited, and protesters claimed that many roadside trees along a 12.5 kilometre section of the upgrade from Buangor to Ararat – said to be sacred to Djab Wurrung people – were not set aside for protection during the works. News media also reported that

the Aboriginal authority that signed off on the highway benefited from the project. VicRoads signed the lucrative land deal with the now-defunct Martang Registered Aboriginal Party, which formally approved the highway project in 2013. Twelve months later, in October 2014, Victoria's roads department gave the authority – all members of one family – hundreds of hectares of land east of the highway, as part of a Trust for Nature covenant. Martang's business arm bought the land and was then refunded the cost through the covenant. In return for conserving the site from development, Martang was promised annual royalties amounting to hundreds of thousands of dollars over ten years. It was part of a requirement to offset the road's destruction of native vegetation, that the department was obligated to meet before works could start.

Authority for the region has since been transferred to Eastern Maar Aboriginal Corporation, a Registered Aboriginal Party which argues that it has negotiated to save "16 trees that were identified as culturally significant. This includes two identified birthing trees, as well as other trees of significance, such as the 'marker', 'directions' and 'grandmother' trees." In 2018, protestors established the Djab Wurrung Heritage Protection Embassy at a campsite near the proposed roadworks, seeking to halt the roadworks and the removal of a further 200 trees which they say are culturally significant. In October 2020, the Victorian Supreme Court issued an injunction against further works.

The controversy has raised a number of further issues. Senator Lidia Thorpe has claimed that neither Martang nor the Eastern Maar Aboriginal Corporation have properly represented Djab Wurrung people, and that the controversy has highlighted issues of transparency and accountability in the processes of the Victorian Aboriginal Heritage Council. Djab Wurrung woman Sissy Eileen Austin has said that the issue highlights inadequacies in the Victorian Traditional Owner Settlement Act. The Eastern Maar Aboriginal Corporation has maintained that trees which were formally assessed to be culturally significant have been adequately protected.

The felling in 2020 of a 350-year-old yellow box eucalypt called the Directions Tree during road upgrading triggered further controversy.

== Alternative names ==
- Bolagher (perhaps a toponym from Lake Bolac, yet it may have denoted, according to Norman Tindale, the northwestern horde of the Kirrae)
- Bolakngat (eastern name)
- Buninjon, Buninyong (a toponym)
- Girriwurra (name of a horde near Maroona)
- Hopkins River Tribe
- Knindowurong
- Kolor (toponym of Mount Rouse), Kolor Kuurndit, Kooloor, Kolorer
- Nutcheyong (the name of one of its hordes at Moyston)
- Pirt-kopan-noot (a dialect name to the north round Ararat)
- Punoinjon (a lake name)
- Purteet-chally (lit. "fight seekers")
- Tyapwuru, Tyapwurru, Chaap Wuurong, Chaapwurru, Djabwuru

Source Tindale 1974:

== Sources ==
- Austin, Sissy Eileen (27 October 2020). "The destruction of a sacred tree on Djab Wurrung country has broken our hearts". The Guardian.
- Beveridge, Peter (1883). "Of the aborigines inhabiting the great lacustrine and Riverine depression of the Lower Murray". Journal and Proceedings of the Royal Society of New South Wales. 17: 19–74. doi:10.5962/p.358946. S2CID 259702285 – via BHL.
- Blake, Barry J. (2011). Dialects of Western Kulin, Western Victoria Yartwatjali, Tjapwurrung, Djadjawurrung (PDF). La Trobe University.
- Bride, T. F. (1969). Letters from Victorian Pioneers. Melbourne: Heinmann. p. 271.
- Clark, Ian D. (1995). Scars in the Landscape: a register of massacre sites in western Victoria, 1803–1859 (PDF). AIATSIS. pp. 57–84. ISBN 0-85575-281-5.
- Clark, Ian D.; Harradine, Lionel L. (1990). The Restoration of Jardwadjali and Djab wurrun names for Rock Art Sites and Landscape Features in and around the Grampians National Park. Koorie Tourism Unit. Archived from the original on 27 July 2018.
- Dawson, James (1881). Australian Aborigines: The Languages and Customs of Several Tribes of Aborigines in the Western District of Victoria, Australia (PDF). Melbourne: George Robertson – via Internet Archive.
- "Djab Wurrung people win temporary work stoppage on Western Highway in Supreme Court". Australia: ABC News. 29 October 2020.
- "Documents expose land deal behind Victoria's Western Highway sacred trees dispute". Australia: ABC News. 5 September 2019.
- Eastern Maar Aboriginal Corporation. "Media release – Fiddle back tree and Western Hwy".
- "Grampians (Gariwerd) National Park". Vicnames. Archived from the original on 12 August 2014.
- Kampmark, Binoy (4 November 2020). "Sawing the Sacred: Felling the Djab Wurrung Directions Tree". CounterPunch.
- Kostanski, Laura (2014). "Duel-Names: How toponyms (placenames) can represent hegemonic histories and alternative narratives" (PDF). In Clark, Ian D.; Hercus, Luise; Kostanski, Laura (eds.). Indigenous and Minority Placenames: Australian and International Perspectives. Australian National University Press. pp. 273–292. ISBN 978-1-925-02162-2.
- Lourandos, Harry (1997). Continent of Hunter-Gatherers: New Perspectives in Australian Prehistory. Cambridge University Press. ISBN 978-0-521-35946-7.
- Madden, Ray (2018). "The Sources of Confusion over Social and Territorial Organisation in Western Victoria". In McConvell, Patrick; Kelly, Piers; Lacrampe, Sébastien (eds.). Skin, Kin and Clan: The Dynamics of Social Categories in Indigenous Australia. ANU Press. doi:10.22459/SKC.04.2018. ISBN 978-1-76046-163-8.
- Mahomet, Amanda (5 November 2020). "Return the Directions Tree!". Djap Wurrung Embassy.
- Mallett, Ashley (2002). The Black Lords of Summer: The Story of the 1868 Aboriginal Tour of England and Beyond. University of Queensland Press. pp. 169–175. ISBN 978-0-702-23262-6.
- Martin, Lisa (22 August 2019). "Protesters defend sacred 800-year-old Djap Wurrung trees as police deadline looms". The Guardian.
- Mitchell, T. L. (2011) [First published 1838]. Three Expeditions into the Interior of Eastern Australia: With Descriptions of the Recently Explored Region of Australia Felix and of the Present Colony of New South Wales. Vol. 2. Cambridge University Press. ISBN 978-1-108-03063-2.
- Pieris, Anoma (2016). Indigenous Cultural Centers and Museums: An Illustrated International Survey. Rowman & Littlefield. ISBN 978-1-442-26407-6.
- Richards, Thomas; Bennett, Catherine M; Webber, Harry (2013). "A post-contact Aboriginal mortuary tree from southwestern Victoria, Australia". Journal of Field Archaeology. 37 (1): 62–72. doi:10.1179/0093469011z.0000000005. S2CID 129783046.
- Thorpe, Lidia (7 November 2019). "Djab Wurrung people have been failed and betrayed at every turn". Crikey.
- Tindale, Norman Barnett (1974). "Tjapwurong (VIC)". Aboriginal Tribes of Australia: Their Terrain, Environmental Controls, Distribution, Limits, and Proper Names. Australian National University Press. ISBN 978-0-708-10741-6. Archived from the original on 27 July 2018.
- "Victorian Ombudsman finds State Government acted in 'good faith' over Western Highway project". Australia: ABC News. 31 July 2020.
- Wilkie, Benjamin (2018). "Rights, reconciliation, and the restoration of Djabwurrung and Jardwadjali names to Grampians-Gariwerd". Victorian Historical Journal. 89 (1): 113–135 – via ResearchGate.
- Wilkie, Benjamin (2020). Gariwerd: An Environmental History of the Grampians. CSIRO Publishing.
- Wilkie, Benjamin; Cahir, Fred; Clark, Ian D. (2020). "Volcanism in Aboriginal Australian oral traditions: Ethnographic evidence from the Newer Volcanics Province". Journal of Volcanology and Geothermal Research. 403: 4. Bibcode:2020JVGR..40306999W. doi:10.1016/j.jvolgeores.2020.106999. S2CID 224945380.
- Wolski, Nathan (2001). "All's not quiet on the Western Front - rethinking resistance and frontiers in Aboriginal historiography". In Russell, Lynette (ed.). Colonial Frontiers: Indigenous-European Encounters in Settler Societies. Manchester University Press. pp. 216–235. ISBN 978-0-719-05859-2.
