= Fighting Waterholes massacre =

Massacre in Victoria, Australia

Coordinates: 37.492°S 141.652°E

Coleraine (Australia)

In April 1840 the Fighting Waterholes massacre of up to 60 Jardwadjali Aboriginal people of the Konongwootong Gundidj clan occurred near the current day Konongwootong reservoir (then known as Den Hills creek), near present-day Coleraine, Victoria, Australia.

== Background ==
On 1 March 1840, the Whyte brothers (William, George, Pringle and James Whyte) of the Konongwootong sheep run, along with their servants, were involved in the Fighting Hills massacre. Aboriginal protector Charles Sievwright investigated the incident but was unable to secure evidence from any third party witnesses, despite depositions from the participants admitting to the killing.

== Massacre ==
On 1 April, after the Konongwootong Gundidj stole sheep, the Whyte brothers and station hands Henry Skilton and William Fox rode off looking for the offenders. Having not found the sheep or Aboriginal people, the Whyte brothers rode off to the nearest station while the remaining station hands rode on to the home station. It was on the way there that station hands came upon "numerous old men, women and children" camping near waterholes. The station hands killed all the members of the camp. There were varying reports of the numbers of the slain, from "numerous" to 40 and 60.

== Aftermath ==
After news of the massacre spread, the Whyte brothers dismissed the station hands.

Eventually the remnants of the Konongwootong Gundidj clan moved on to Murndal station, where they joined the Wanedeet Gundidj clan.

Later, news stories attributed the massacre to retaliation organised by the Whyte brothers to avenge the killing of a white shepherd in the area of Merino Downs.

In 1946 heavy flood uncovered skulls and bones, which were discovered by T. J. Fitzgerald. The remains were later reburied.

== Memorial ==
A commemorative site at the Konong Wootong reservoir, named the Konongwootong Quiet Place, was created in 2014 to acknowledge the event.
