= Djab Wurrung Heritage Protection Embassy =

Former Aboriginal activist space in Victoria

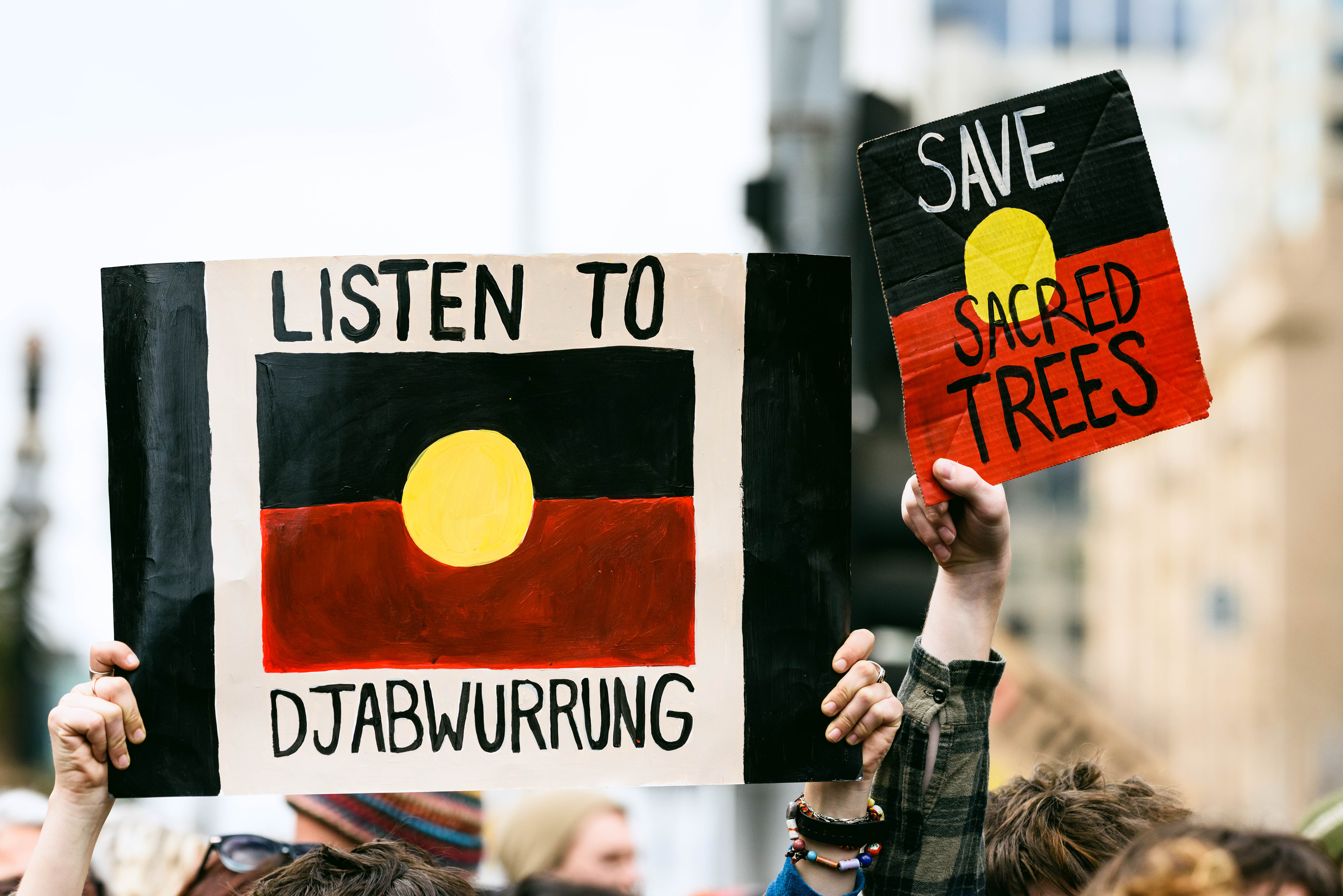
Djab Wurrung Embassy signs at a protest in Melbourne

The Djab Wurrung Heritage Protection Embassy or Djab Wurrung Embassy was an activist space from 2018 to 2021 that comprised three camps near Buangor, Victoria. The Embassy's goal was to block the Victorian Government from destroying sacred birthing trees and advocate for Aboriginal sovereignty and land rights. The Embassy was led by Djab Wurrung people and received visitors and support from First Nations people and the broader community. The sites of the Embassy were dismantled during arrests in 2020, during which the 'Directions Tree' was destroyed.

== Background ==
Several sacred trees were scheduled to be destroyed by VicRoads to make way for the reduplication of the Western Highway. The upgrade was announced in 2013 and would run Ballarat and Stawell.

The Embassy was not against the highway improvements, but wanted to be consulted and did not want the trees destroyed.

VicRoads stated that over a seven-year period there had been more than 100 crashes on the highway between Ballarat and Stawell – 11 people had died and more than 50 were seriously injured. However, the upgrade was criticised for only taking three minutes off the drive.

The designation of the camps as an embassy emphasised sovereignty and called back to the history of the Aboriginal Tent Embassy. In one interview, a lead activist at the Embassy stated "what we have done here is a reclamation of our sacred land under the rule of sovereignty."

=== Birthing trees ===
The birthing trees are eucalypts under which many generations of Djab Wurrung people were born. These trees carried significant cultural importance. They are located on sacred women's land. A directions tree was made when a child was born. The father would take the placenta and the mother would take a seed, and these were planted with a tree to become a directions tree. These trees grew according to how the child grew.

The trees are hundreds of years old and are tied to the songs and stories of the Djab Wurrung people. The trees connect Djab Wurrung people to Mount Langi Ghiran, known as 'the black cockatoo dreaming site', and to the Hopkins River, which has a connection to the eel dreaming.

The destruction of the Directions Tree has been likened to the destruction of the rock shelters at the Juukan Gorge or Paris' Notre Dame.

== Embassy history ==
On 18 June 2018, the embassy was established as a lone tent and quickly grew to include a top camp, middle camp and women's camp.

An agreement was reached in 2019 between VicRoads and the Eastern Maar Aboriginal Corporation, the Registered Aboriginal Party for the area, to protect 15 trees. However, the Embassy disputed the process stating that Eastern Maar did not speak for them. The Directions Tree was not among the trees designated by Eastern Maar, and VicRoads stated that the tree was not of an old enough age to be significant. However, others say the tree was 350 years old and a heritage report by Dr Heather Bluith identified the tree as a cultural marker tree because it had a small circular scar and a quartz blade fragment nearby.

Multiple Supreme Court battles were held to block the removal of the trees. In December 2019, the Federal Environment Minister Sussan Ley was required to review the protection of the trees after a formal error in their last decision. However, Ley decided that the trees, while culturally significant, were not at risk because there was a protection agreement between Eastern Maar and VicRoads. However, this agreement was not formalised.

The camps that formed the Embassy were dismantled during arrests by Victoria Police directly after sustained lockdowns in 2020 during the COVID-19 pandemic. During these lockdowns, many supporters could not get to the embassy as there was a police perimeter around Melbourne. Fifty people were arrested and those that did come were given $5000 fines. Shortly afterwards, VicRoads chopped down the 'Directions Tree'. These events and the arrests of activists led to the Embassy falling apart, despite efforts to keep it going.

== Legacy ==
In June 2022, the Victorian Government announced that a new Cultural Heritage Management Plan would be created that would address the trees. The previous plan, created in 2013, did not cover the trees. Marjorie Thorpe, the lead applicant in several court cases, approved of the result and noted that the new plan would allow litigants to hold the government accountable if they failed to protect the trees.

== See also ==
- Aboriginal Tent Embassy
- Aboriginal sovereignty
- Indigenous rights
- Songline
