= Wando River (Victoria) =

River in Victoria, Australia

Wando
- Location of the Wando River mouth in Victoria

Location
- Country: Australia
- State: Victoria
- Region: Victorian Midlands (IBRA), Western District
- Local government area: Glenelg Shire

Physical characteristics
- Source
  - location: north of Coleraine
  - coordinates: 37°26′30″S 141°33′38″E
  - elevation: 146 m (479 ft)
- Mouth: confluence with the Macpherson Creek
  - location: Wando, north of Casterton
  - coordinates: 37°30′18″S 141°25′6″E
  - elevation: 59 m (194 ft)
- Length: 34 km (21 mi)

Basin features
- River system: Glenelg Hopkins catchment

The Wando River, a perennial river of the Glenelg Hopkins catchment, is located in the Western District of Victoria, Australia.

== Location and features ==
The Wando River rises north of Coleraine and flows generally west, then south, before reaching its confluence with Macpherson Creek, a tributary of the Glenelg River, near the locale of Wando, north of Casterton. The river descends 190 metres (620 ft) over its 34-kilometre (21 mi) course.

== See also ==
- List of rivers in Victoria
