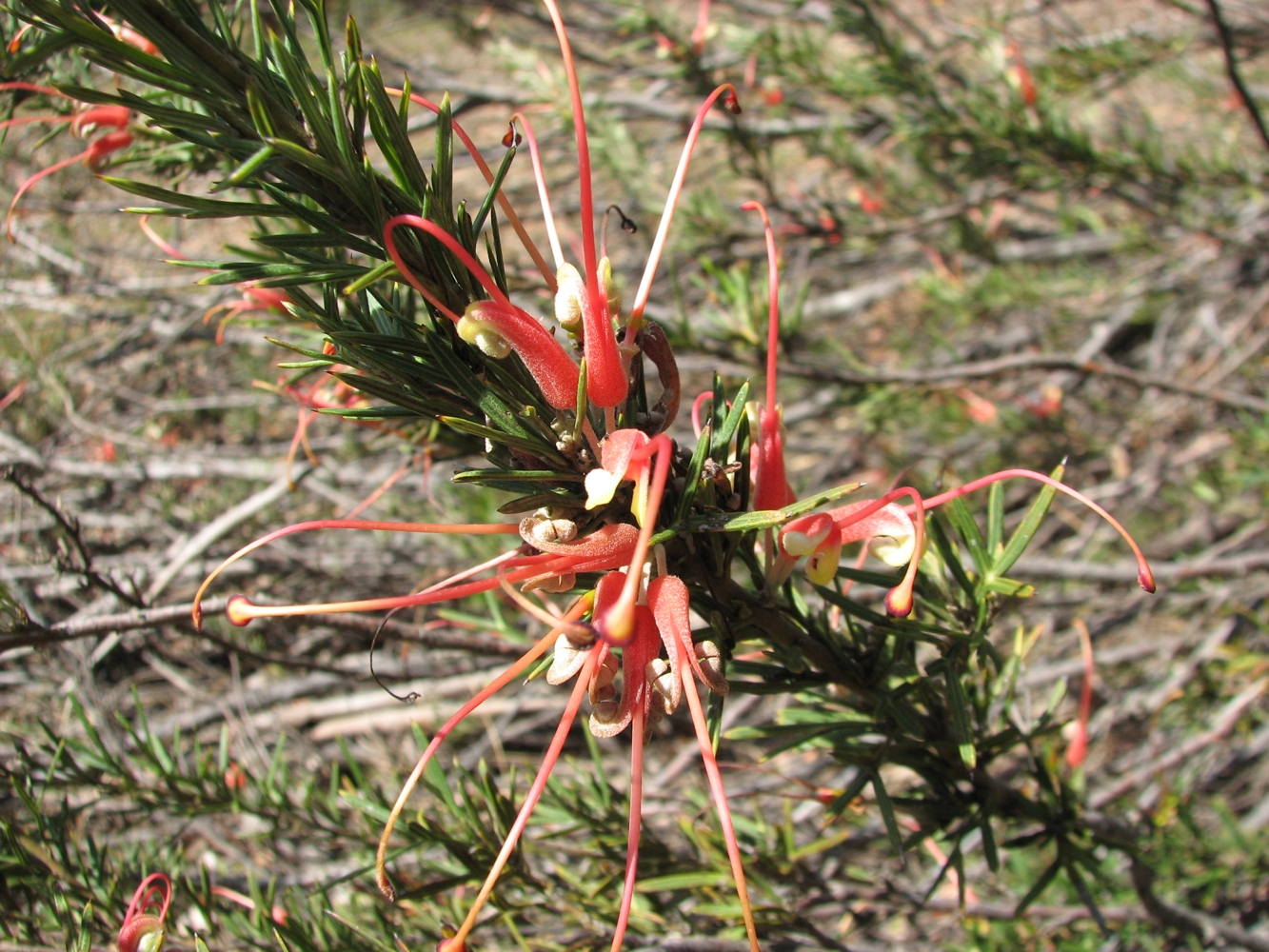
- Subspecies tripartita in the Peter Francis Points Arboretum, Coleraine

Scientific classification
- Kingdom: Plantae
- Clade: Tracheophytes
- Clade: Angiosperms
- Clade: Eudicots
- Order: Proteales
- Family: Proteaceae
- Genus: Grevillea
- Species: G. tripartita

Binomial name
- Grevillea tripartita Meisn.

= Grevillea tripartita =

Species of shrub endemic to Western Australia

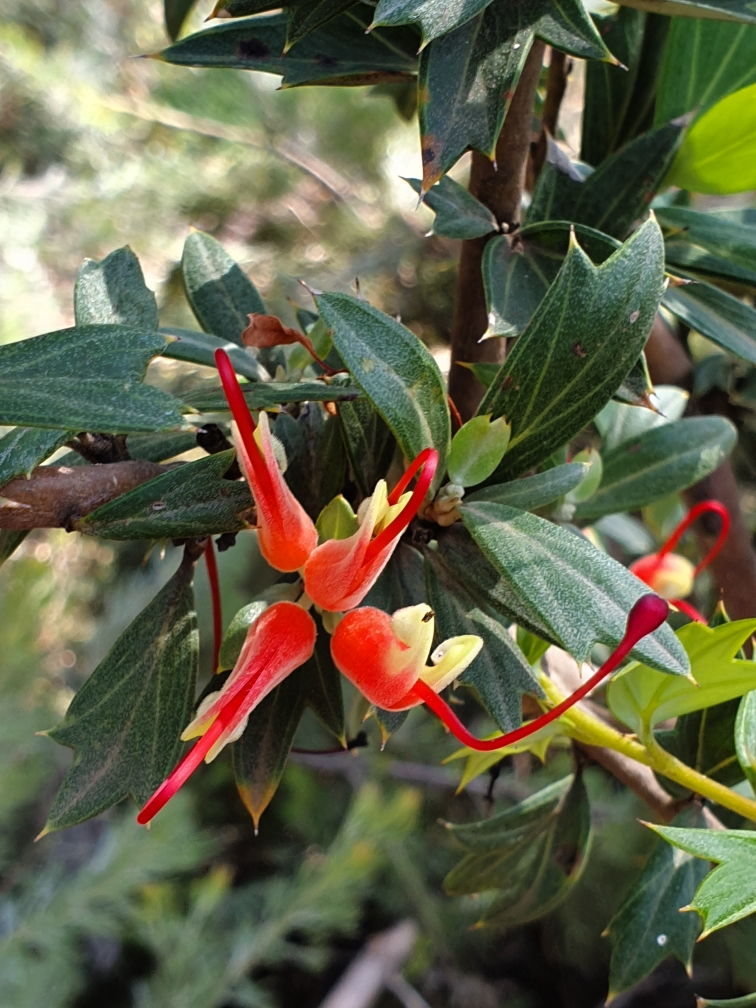
Subspecies macrostylis in the Australian National Botanic Gardens

Grevillea tripartita is species of flowering plant in the family Proteaceae and is endemic to the south-west of Western Australia. It is an erect, prickly shrub with divided leaves with 3 lobes, and clusters of red and cream-coloured or reddish-orange and yellow flowers.

== Description ==
Grevillea tripartita is usually an erect shrub, rarely low-lying, that typically grows to a height of 1–3 m (3 ft 3 in – 9 ft 10 in). Its leaves are 10–50 mm (0.39–1.97 in) long and up to 35 mm (1.4 in) wide, usually deeply divided with 3 triangular to more or less linear lobes 2–22 mm (0.079–0.866 in) long and 1.5–3.0 mm (0.059–0.118 in) wide. Sometimes the leaves are elliptic or narrowly elliptic with 3 lobes 10–40 mm (0.39–1.57 in) long and 2–5 mm (0.079–0.197 in) wide on the end. The edges of the leaves are turned down to rolled under without concealing the silky- to shaggy-hairy lower surface. The flowers are arranged in loose clusters of 2 to 6 on the ends of branches or in upper leaf axils on a rachis 0.2–4 mm (0.0079–0.1575 in) long, the flowers nearer the end of the rachis flowering first. The flowers are red and cream-coloured or reddish-orange and yellow, depending on subspecies, and the pistil is 46–52 mm (1.8–2.0 in) long. Flowering time varies with subspecies, and the fruit is a follicle 12–15 mm (0.47–0.59 in) long with a conspicuous ridge.

== Taxonomy ==
Grevillea tripartita was first formally described in 1856 by Carl Meissner in de Candolle's Prodromus Systematis Naturalis Regni Vegetabilis from specimens collected by James Drummond in the Swan River Colony.

The specific epithet (tripartita) means "divided into three parts", referring to the leaves.

In 2000, Robert Makinson described two subspecies of G. tripartita in Flora of Australia, and the names are accepted by the Australian Plant Census:

- Grevillea tripartita subsp. macrostylis (F.Muell.) Makinson, (previously known as Grevillea macrostylis) is a spreading shrub with triangular teeth or lobes, the flowers reddish to orange and yellow to cream-coloured flowers mainly from August to December.
- Grevillea tripartita Meisn. subsp. tripartita is a more or less erect shrub with deeply divided, spreading, linear lobes, the flowers orange-red and yellow flowers in most months, with a peak from August to November.

== Distribution ==
Subspecies macrostylis grows in mallee heath and coastal heath and is common on the south coast of Western Australia between East Mount Barren and Point Culver in the Esperance Plains bioregion. Subspecies tripartita grows in mallee scrub or shrubland and is widespread on the south coast from near the Stirling Range to East Mount Barren and Jerramungup in the Esperance Plains and Mallee bioregions.

== Conservation status ==
Both subspecies of G. tripartita are listed as "not threatened" by the Government of Western Australia Department of Biodiversity, Conservation and Attractions.

== See also ==
- List of Grevillea species
