= Jardwadjali =

Aboriginal Australian people of central Victoria

Regions with significant populations

Languages
- Jardwadjali, English

Religion
- Australian Aboriginal mythology, Christianity

Related ethnic groups
- Djab wurrung, Dhauwurd wurrung and Wergaia see List of Indigenous Australian group names

The Jardwadjali (Yartwatjali), also known as the Jaadwa, are an Aboriginal Australian people of the state of Victoria, whose traditional lands occupy the lands in the upper Wimmera River watershed east to Gariwerd (Grampians) and west to Lake Bringalbert.

== Language ==
The Jardwadjali language was mutually intelligible with Djab wurrung, with which it shared shares 90 percent of common vocabulary. Sub-dialects include Jagwadjali, Mardidjali, and Nundadjali.

== Country ==
Norman Tindale located the Jardwadjali at Horsham and the Upper Wimmera River. Their land, he states, extended over 3,500 square miles (9,100 km^{2}), reaching southwards to the Morton Plains and Grampians. The western borders lay as far as Mount Arapiles and Mount Talbot, while their eastern frontier went beyond Glenorchy and Stawell. They went north as far as around Warracknabeal and Lake Buloke. He also adds that by the time white colonization began, they had penetrated south almost to Casterton and Hamilton.

== Social organization ==
The Jardwadjali were divided into several hordes.

- Djappuminyou (a horde)
- Bulukwuro (centred around Lake Buloke)
- Portbulluc (around Mount Zero)
- Murra-murrabarap (around Glenorchy)

Lake Buloke was used as the site where several tribes travelled joined the Jardwadjali in order to conduct ceremonies.

== History ==
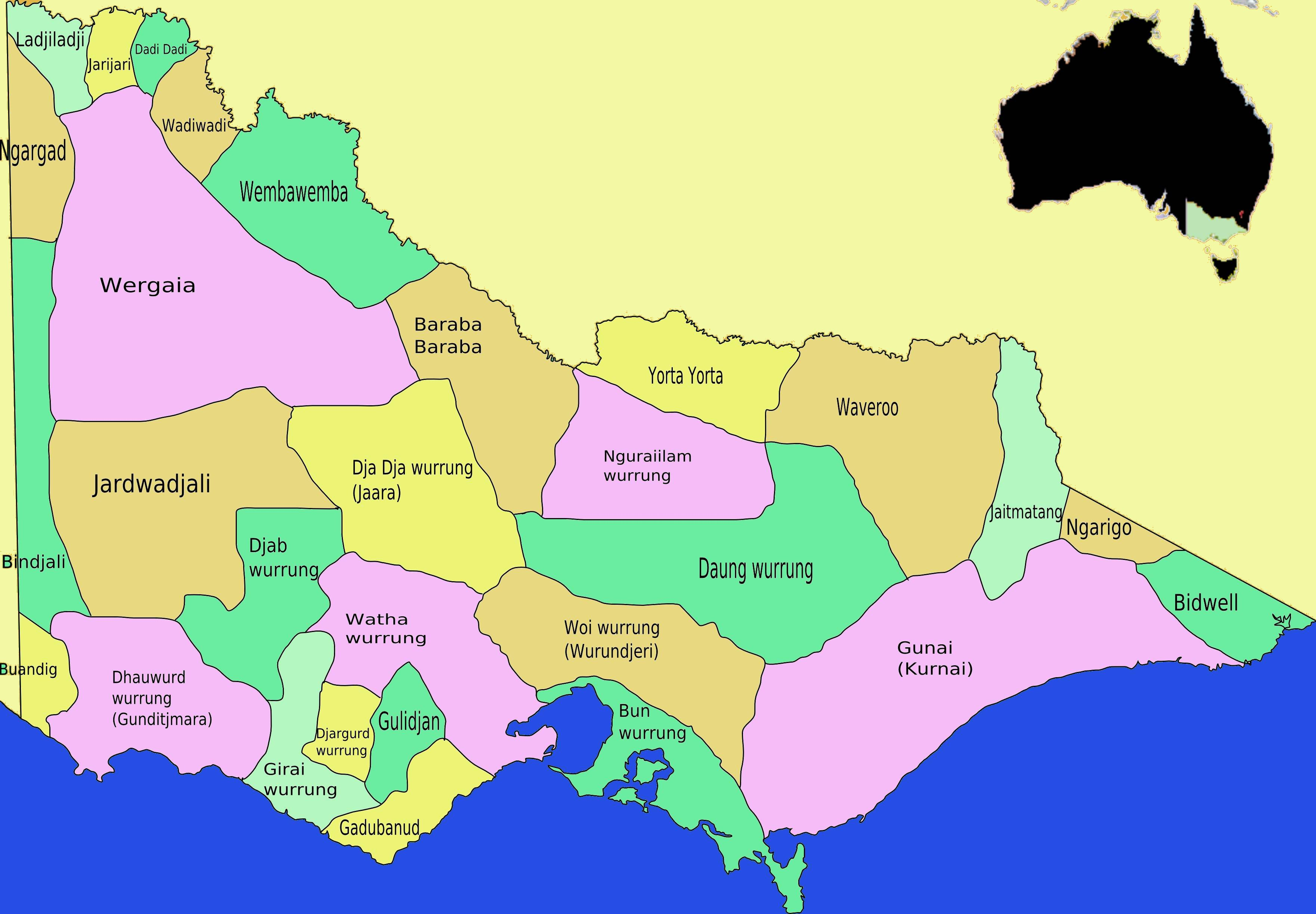
Victorian Aboriginal language territories

It was originally thought that areas of traditional Jardwadjali land showed signs of human occupation dating back no more than 5,000 years. Recent research has established a longer timeframe, from the late Pleistocene to the Holocene, where the record of habitation becomes much richer. Archaeological evidence of occupation in Gariwerd many thousands of years before the last ice-age. One site in the Victoria Range (Billawin Range) has been dated from 22,000 years ago.

It is likely that first contact with Europeans was through smallpox epidemics which arrived with the First Fleet in 1788 and rapidly spread through the trading networks of indigenous Australians and killed many people in two waves before the 1830s. One Wotjobaluk account called the disease thinba micka and that it killed large numbers of people, and disfigured many more with pock-marked faces, and came down the Murray River sent by malevolent sorcerers to the north. According to Norman Tindale, by the time white incursion began, the Jaadwa were on the move southwards, almost as far as Casterton and Hamilton.

=== Conflict and dispossession ===
In 1836 the squatter Edward Henty was exploring Jardwadjali land from the south, the start of the European invasion. A further wave of European occupation occurred from the north in 1840 with Lieutenant Robert Briggs squatting near Lake Lonsdale.

The explorer Major Thomas Mitchell passed through the lands of the Jardwadjali people in 1836 and named many geographical features, including the Grampian mountains which he named after the range of mountains in Scotland. The Jardwadjali called these mountains Gariwerd, gar meaning 'pointed mountain'; i meaning 'the' and werd meaning 'shoulder'.

To the Jardwadjali and Djab Wurrung peoples Gariwerd was central to the dreaming of the creator, Bunjil, and buledji Brambimbula, the two Bram brothers, who were responsible for the creation and naming of many landscape features in western Victoria.

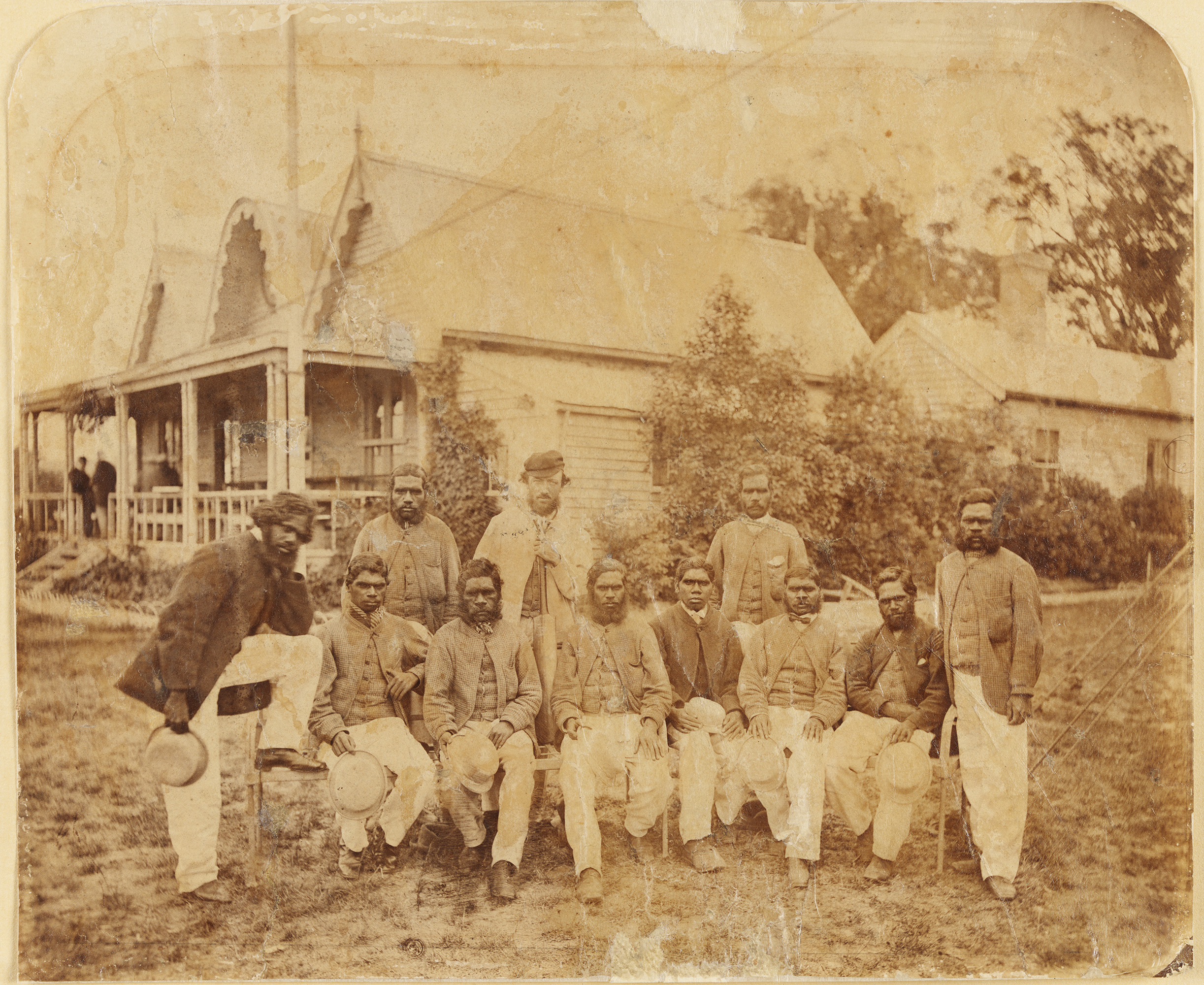
An Aboriginal cricket team pictured with their captain Tom Wills for a match at the MCG in late December 1866

Jardwadjali people formed the nucleus of the Australian Aboriginal cricket team in England in 1868, although efforts were made by the Central Board for the Protection of Aborigines to stop the tour. The team played 47 matches, winning 14, losing 14, and drawing 19 games.

There were no aboriginal missions established in Jardwadjali territory, so by the 1860s and 1870s many Jardwadjali were forced to locate at Ebenezer Mission in Wergaia country on the Wimmera River, and at Lake Condah mission in Dhauwurd Wurrung country.

=== Massacres ===
Settlement was marked by resistance to the invasion often by driving off or stealing cows which then resulted in conflict and sometimes a massacre of aboriginal people.

Very few of these reports were acted upon to bring the settlers to court. After the massacre at Fighting Hills, John Whyte travelled to Melbourne to inform Governor La Trobe in person of the massacre. The depositions of the Aboriginal Protector Charles Sievwright who had personally investigated the massacre were disallowed. No trial was ever held. At the time aborigines were denied the right to give evidence in courts of law. The incidents listed below are just the cases that have been reported; it is likely other incidents occurred that were never reported and not documented officially. Neil Black, a squatter in Western Victoria writing on 9 December 1839 states the prevailing attitude of many settlers:

The best way [to procure a run] is to go outside and take up a new run, provided the conscience of the party is sufficiently seared to enable him without remorse to slaughter natives right and left. It is universally and distinctly understood that the chances are very small indeed of a person taking up a new run being able to maintain possession of his place and property without having recourse to such means -- sometimes by wholesale...

George Robinson, the Chief Protector of Aborigines wrote in his journal in 1841 referring to the Portland Bay area where the Whyte Brothers had settled:

The settlers at the Bay spoke of the settlers up the country dropping the natives as coolly as if they were speaking of dropping cows. Indeed, the doctrine is being promulgated that they are not human, or hardly so and thereby inculcating the principle that killing them is no murder

Reported massacres in Jardwadjali country to 1859
Date	Location	Aboriginal people involved	Europeans involved	Aboriginal deaths reported
8 March 1840	the Hummocks near Wando Vale, known as Fighting Hills	Konongwootong gundidj clan	William Whyte, George Whyte, Prongle Whyte, James Whyte, John Whyte, and 3 employees: Daniel Turner, Benjamin Wardle, William Gillespie	over 40 men, women and children and possibly up to 80 people
March 1840	Merino Downs Station, Wannon River	Konongwootong gundidj clan	George McNamara, hut-keeper	'Lanky Bill', sole survivor from the Fighting Hills massacre
1 April 1840	near Konongwootong reservoir, called Fighting Waterholes	Konongwootong gundidj clan	Station hands, employees of the Whyte brothers	numerous old men, women and children
14 January 1840	Nangeela Station, Glenelg River	clan unknown	Robert Savage and captain HEP Dana	two people
June - September 1840	The Grange, Southern Grampians (Gariwerd)	Jardwadjali or Djab wurrung, unknown clans	Charles Wedge and others	5 in June, 13 in August, 5 in September
1841	Junction of Glenelg and Wannon rivers	Jardwadjali or Dhauwurd wurrung, unknown clans	employees of Augustine Barton	17 people
August 1842	Tahara or Spring Valley stations	Jardwadjali or Dhauwurd wurrung, unknown clan	employees of Trevor Winter	one person
6 August 1843	Victoria Range	Jardwadjali, unknown clan	HEP Dana and Native Police Corps	20 people
13 August 1843	near Mount Zero	Jardwadjali, unknown clan	HEP Dana and detachment of Native Police Corps	at least 4 people
9 November 1843	Thomas Rickett's stations on Glenelg River near Harrow	Jardwadjali, unknown clan	Thomas Ricketts and employees	3 people
19 October 1844	country 40 km north of Longerenong station	Jardwadjali, unknown clan	Sergeant James Daplin, troopers Sparrow and Bushe of the Border Police, David Cameron	2 people - Jim Crow and Charlie
11 July 1845	unknown	Jardwadjali, unknown clan	HEP Dana and detachment of Native Police Corps	three people
6 February 1846	Mullagh station, 11 km north of Harrow	Jardwadjali, unknown clan	employees of Walter Birmingham and Owen O'Reilly	one person
October 1847	Mount Talbot	Jardwadjali, unknown clan	John Stockell	one person
26 June 1849	Wannon river	Jardwadjali, unknown clan	James Lloyd, hut keeper for John Ralston, Roseneath station	one person

=== Recent history ===
In 1989 there was a proposal by Victorian Minister for Tourism, Steve Crabb to rename many geographical place names associated with aboriginal heritage in the area. There was much opposition to this proposal by European descendants. The Brambuk centre, representing five aboriginal communities, advocated a dual name for the main area: Gariwerd/Grampians. Some of the changes included:

- Grampians to Gariwerd (mountain range)
- Mount Zero to Mura Mura (little hill)
- Hall's Gap to Budja Budja

The Brambuk National Park and Cultural Centre in Halls Gap is owned and managed by Jardwadjali and Djab Wurrung people from five Aboriginal communities with historic links to the Gariwerd-Grampians ranges and the surrounding plains.

=== Native title recognition ===
The indigenous peoples of the Wimmera won native title recognition on 13 December 2005 after a ten-year legal process. Descendants of the Jardwadjali had a partial recognition in 2005 of their land rights when a settlement was arranged, which included also the Wotjobaluk, Wergaia and Jupagalk, returning freehold title over a number of areas was transferred back to the traditional owners.

It was the first successful native title claim in south-eastern Australia and in Victoria, determined by Justice Ron Merkel. In his reasons for judgement Justice Merkel explained the significance of his orders:

"The orders I propose to make are of special significance as they constitute the first recognition and protection of native title resulting in the ongoing enjoyment of native title in the State of Victoria and, it would appear, on the South-Eastern seaboard of Australia. These are areas in which the Aboriginal peoples suffered severe and extensive dispossession, degradation and devastation as a consequence of the establishment of British sovereignty over their lands and waters during the 19th century."

== Notable members ==
- Maggie of the Wando, massacre survivor and guide for the explorer Thomas Mitchell.
- Unaarriman, better known in cricket circles as Johnny Mullagh was born around 1843, was a Jardwadjali.

== Alternative names ==
- Boolucburer
- Brapkut (name of speech of southern hordes)
- Dallundeer (of Wembawemba),
- Ja:rewe
- Knen-knen-wurrong
- Knenkorenwurro
- Knindowurrong (i.e., clear speakers, term claimed by several tribes), Knindowurong,
- Milangburn
- Morton Plains tribe
- Mukja:dwen
- Mukjarawaint
- Nandatjali (language name [nanda = good, jali = speech])
- Ngengenwuru
- Ngenngen-wurro
- Nundatyalli
- Yarawain
- Yardwa-tyalli
- Yartwur

Source: Tindale 1974, p. 204

== Some words ==
- daruaj (man)

== Sources ==
- Bird, Caroline; Frankel, David (2005). "An Archaeology of Gariwerd: From Pleistocene to Holocene in Western Victoria". TEMPUS Archaeology and Material Culture Studies in Anthropology. 8. ISBN 0909611505.
- Bride, Thomas (1898). Letters from Victorian Pioneers. Melbourne: Robert Brain.
- Broome, Richard (2005). Aboriginal Victorians: A History Since 1800. Allen & Unwin. ISBN 978-1-74114-569-4.
- Clark, Ian D. (1995). Scars in the Landscape: a register of massacre sites in western Victoria, 1803–1859 (PDF). AIATSIS. pp. 169–175. ISBN 0-85575-281-5.
- Clark, Ian D. (1998). "That's My Country Belonging to Me": Aboriginal Land Tenure and Dispossession in Nineteenth Century Western Victoria. Heritage Matters. ISBN 978-1-876-40406-2.
- Clark, Ian D.; Harradine, Lionel L. (1990). The restoration of Jardwadjali and Djab Wurrung names for rock art sites and landscape features in and around the Grampians National Park. Melbourne: Koorie Tourism Unit. Archived from the original on 27 July 2018.
- Gerrard, Emily (2012). "Towards a Carbon Constrained Future: Climate Change, Emissions Trading and Indigenous Peoples' Rights in Australia" (PDF). In Weir, Jessica K. (ed.). Country, Native Title and Ecology. Australian National University Press. pp. 135–174. ISBN 978-1-921-86256-4.
- Kostanski, Laura (2009). 'What's in a name?': place and toponymic attachment, identity and dependence: a case study of the Grampians (Gariwerd) National Park name restoration process (Doctoral thesis). University of Ballarat. pp. 135–174.
- Mallett, Ashley Alexander (2002). The Black Lords of Summer: The Story of the 1868 Aboriginal Tour of England and Beyond. University of Queensland Press. ISBN 978-0-702-23262-6.
- Merkel, Ron (13 December 2005). "Clarke on behalf of the Wotjobaluk, Jaadwa, Jadawadjali, Wergaia and Jupagulk peoples v state of Victoria" (PDF). AustLII Federal Court of Australia.
- Pieris, Anoma (2016). Indigenous Cultural Centers and Museums: An Illustrated International Survey. Rowman & Littlefield. ISBN 978-1-442-26407-6.
- Porter, Libby (2016). Unlearning the Colonial Cultures of Planning. Routledge. ISBN 978-1-317-00427-1.
- Shiel, Fergus (14 December 2005). "Past gives us strength, Aborigines say". The Age.
- Thrush, Coll (2016). Indigenous London: Native Travelers at the Heart of Empire. Yale University Press. ISBN 978-0-300-22486-3.
- Tindale, Norman Barnett (1974). "Jaadwa (VIC)". Aboriginal Tribes of Australia: Their Terrain, Environmental Controls, Distribution, Limits, and Proper Names. Australian National University Press. ISBN 978-0-708-10741-6. Archived from the original on 2 July 2017.
