= Fighting Hills massacre =

Massacre in Victoria, Australia

The Fighting Hills massacre occurred on 8 March 1840 when Victorian Western District squatters killed 51 Aboriginal people of the Konongwootong gundidj clan (Jardwadjali) at The Hummocks, near Wando Vale, Victoria, Australia.

== History ==
The Whyte brothers (William, George, Pringle and James Whyte) and cousin John Whyte managed the Konongwootong run near Hamilton, Victoria. On 8 March, the Whytes and three convict employees, Benjamin Wardle, Daniel Turner and William Gillespie, set off to recover over 120 sheep stolen the previous day.

The party found Aboriginal people cooking and eating the missing sheep; the subsequent attack killed 51 Jardwadjali men. The party recovered all but 45 sheep. There was one Aboriginal survivor, who was killed a month later.

Aboriginal protector Charles Sievwright investigated the incident but the depositions he took were disallowed by Crown prosecutor James Croke as they were not "taken in accordance to the rules of law". John Whyte went personally to report the "affray" to Superintendent Charles La Trobe, then Chief Protector George Robinson. No further action was taken.

== Aftermath ==
A subsequent massacre known as the Fighting Waterholes massacre took place only months later involving some of the same party.

In 1843, an employee from the Whytes' station was killed - believed to be in retaliation for the massacres.
