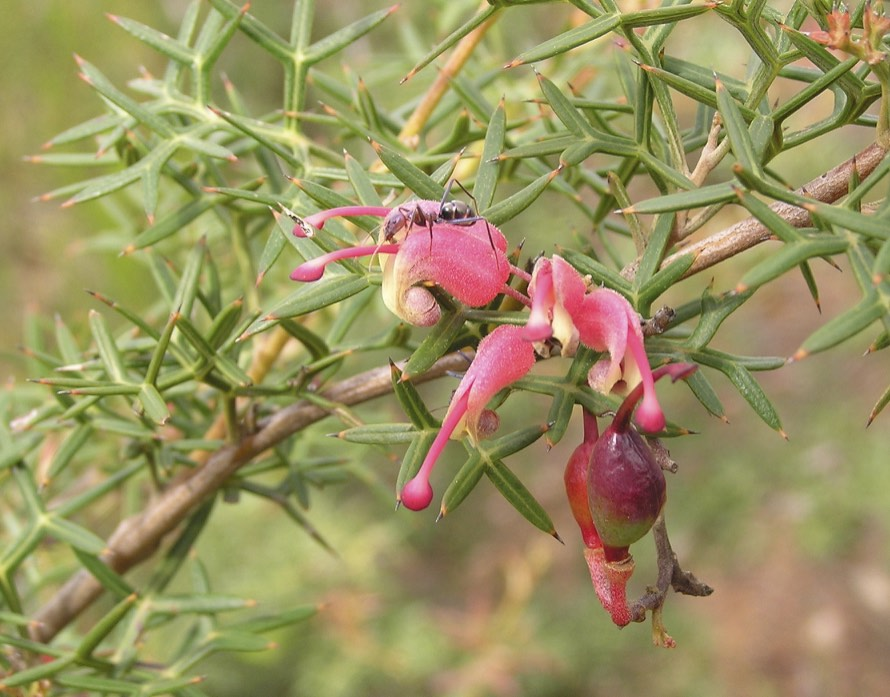
- Near Ravensthorpe

Scientific classification
- Kingdom: Plantae
- Clade: Tracheophytes
- Clade: Angiosperms
- Clade: Eudicots
- Order: Proteales
- Family: Proteaceae
- Genus: Grevillea
- Species: G. patentiloba

Binomial name
- Grevillea patentiloba F.Muell.

= Grevillea patentiloba =

Species of shrub endemic to Western Australia

Grevillea patentiloba is a species of flowering plant in the family Proteaceae and is endemic to the south-west of Western Australia. It is a prostrate to erect, spreading to straggling shrub with divided leaves, and down-turned clusters of red to deep pink and cream-coloured to bright yellow flowers with a red to deep pink style.

== Description ==
Grevillea patentiloba is a prostrate to erect, spreading to straggling shrub that typically grows to a height of 0.3–3 m (1 ft 0 in – 9 ft 10 in). Its leaves are 15–50 mm (0.59–1.97 in) long and 15–65 mm (0.59–2.56 in) wide in outline, and pinnatisect to pinnatipartite or pinnatifid with 3 to 7 lobes widely spreading lobes, usually divided again, the end lobes linear to oblong or triangular and sharply pointed, 3–20 mm (0.12–0.79 in) long and 1–9 mm (0.039–0.354 in) wide. The edges of the lobes are turned down or rolled under, enclosing most of the lower surface. The flowers are arranged in down-turned clusters of 2 to 10 flowers on a silky-hairy rachis 1–5 mm (0.039–0.197 in) long, the pistil 15–20 mm (0.59–0.79 in) long. The flowers are red to deep pink and cream-coloured to bright yellow, the style red to deep pink. Flowering time depends on subspecies and the fruit is a glabrous follicle 10–14 mm (0.39–0.55 in) long.

== Taxonomy ==
Grevillea patentiloba was first formally described in 1859 by Ferdinand von Mueller in Fragmenta Phytographiae Australiae. The specific epithet (patentiloba) means "spreading-lobed", referring to the leaves.

In 1994, Peter Olde and Neil Marriott described two subspecies of G. patentiloba in The Grevillea Book, and the names are accepted by the Australian Plant Census:

- Grevillea patentiloba F.Muell. subsp. patentiloba is a prostrate to low, spreading shrub usually less than 1 m (3 ft 3 in) high that flowers from June to November.
- Grevillea patentiloba subsp. platypoda (F.Muell.) Olde & Marriott is a robust, more or less upright shrub usually 1.5–3 m (4 ft 11 in – 9 ft 10 in) high that flowers from July to November.

== Distribution and habitat ==
Subspecies patentiloba grows in heath and scrubby woodland from near Lake King to Hopetoun and near Ravensthorpe in the Esperance Plains and Mallee bioregions of south-western Western Australia and subspecies platyloba grows in open woodland and shrubland in the Ravensthorpe area in the Esperance Plains bioregion.

== Conservation status ==
Both subspecies of G. patentiloba are listed as "not threatened" by the Government of Western Australia Department of Biodiversity, Conservation and Attractions.

== See also ==
- List of Grevillea species
