= Coleraine, Victoria =

Coleraine
- Town
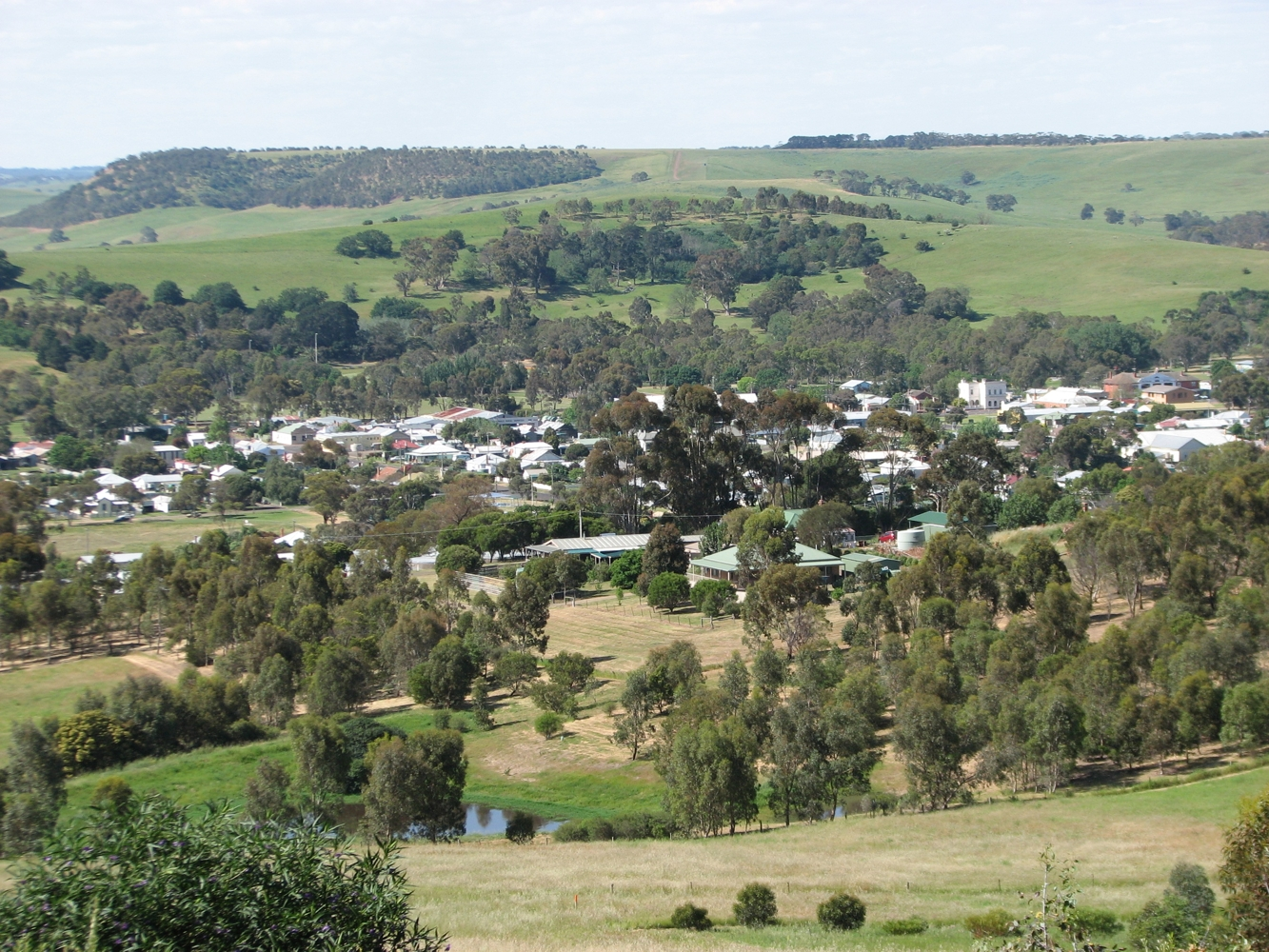
- View of town from Peter Francis Points Arboretum

- Coordinates: 37°36′0″S 141°42′0″E
- Country: Australia
- State: Victoria
- LGA: Shire of Southern Grampians
- Location: 335 km (208 mi) W of Melbourne; 34 km (21 mi) NW of Hamilton; 30 km (19 mi) E of Casterton

Government
  - State electorate: Lowan
  - Federal division: Wannon

Population
  - Total: 1,062 (2021 census)
- Postcode: 3315

Coleraine is a town in Victoria, Australia on the Glenelg Highway, 334 kilometres (208 mi) west of the state capital, Melbourne and 34 kilometres (21 mi) north-west of Hamilton in the Shire of Southern Grampians local government area. It was named after the town in County Londonderry, Northern Ireland. At the 2021 census, Coleraine had a population of 1,062.

== History ==
The area was first settled by Europeans in 1838 for pastoral grazing. The town was surveyed later on Bryan Creek, a tributary of the Wannon River.

In April 1840 the Fighting Waterholes massacre of up to 60 Jardwadjali people of the Konongwootong Gundidj clan occurred near the current day Konongwootong reservoir.

The Post Office opened on 16 November 1854.

The Coleraine Magistrates' Court closed on 1 November 1981, not having been visited by a Magistrate since 1971.

Today, Coleraine's primary industries are beef and wool. The town hosts an Agricultural Show in November and an art show in August.

Notable past residents of Coleraine include cosmetics manufacturer Helena Rubenstein.

== Sport ==
Coleraine has a football team playing in the South West District Football League.

It has a horse racing club, the Coleraine Racing Club, which runs the Coleraine Cup meeting in September. The meeting features the steeplechase race commemorating the feats of district horsemen and renowned Australian poet Adam Lindsay Gordon.

Golfers play at the Coleraine Golf Club on Gordon Street.
