= Djabwurrung language =

Extinct Aboriginal Australian language

Djab Wurrung
- Tjapwurrung
- Chaap Wuurong
- Native to: Australia
- Region: Victoria
- Ethnicity: Djab Wurrung
- Native speakers: 17 (2011)
- Language family: Pama–Nyungan: Kulinic; Kulin; Djab Wurrung
- Dialects: Pirtpirtwurrung; Knenknenwurrung; Djabwurrung

Language codes
- ISO 639-3: tjw
- Glottolog: djab1234
- AIATSIS: S26 Djab Wurrung, S86 Pirtpirtwurrung
- ELP: Djabwurrung
- Location of Djab Wurrung Country in Victoria

Djab Wurrung (Djabwurrung, Tjapwurrung, Chaap Wuurong, Djaara, Jaara) is the extinct Aboriginal Australian language of the Djab Wurrung people of central Victoria.
