= Charles Sievwright =

British army officer and Aboriginal Protector

Charles Wightman Sievwright (31 March 1800 – 10 September 1855) was a British army officer before being appointed Assistant Protector of Aborigines in part of the Port Phillip District of the colony of New South Wales, now Victoria, Australia.

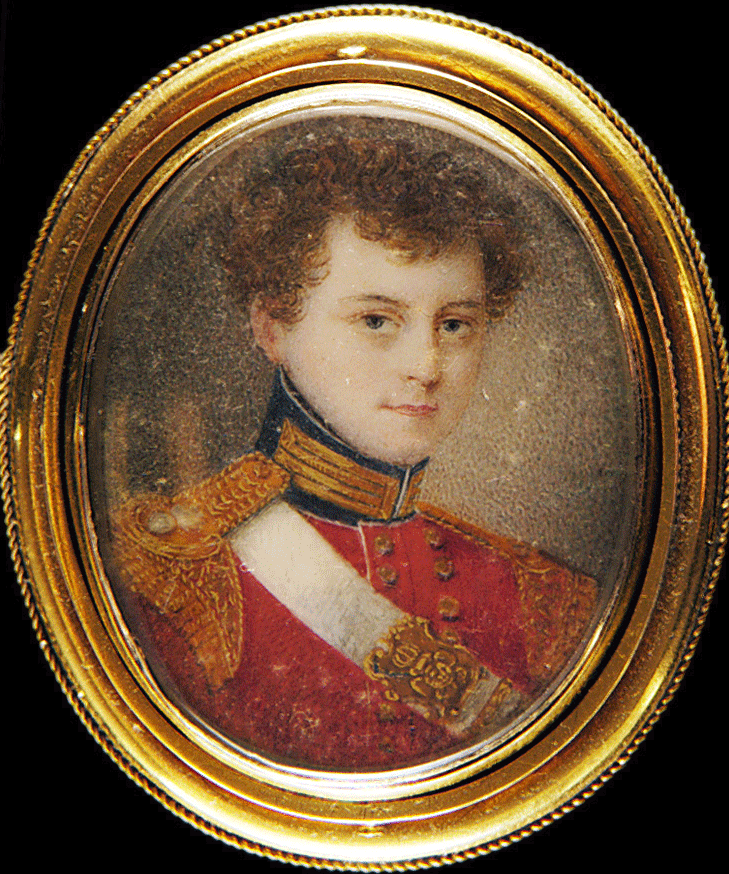
A portrait of Charles Sievwright in his Royal Fusiliers uniform c. 1825

== Early life ==
Charles Wightman Sievwright, born on 31 March 1800 in Edinburgh, Scotland, was the third-born of seven children of Edinburgh lawyer Andrew Sievwright and his wife Ann, née Robertson. Andrew Sievwright's extensive business interests included slave ownership.

At the age of fifteen, Charles entered a Scottish infantry regiment. He served for 20 years in the British Army, mainly in the Royal Fusiliers, without any involvement in war.

In 1837 he returned to London from a stint in Malta, sold his commission, and was subsequently appointed as one of four assistants in the Port Phillip District of New South Wales to the new Chief Protector of Aborigines, George Augustus Robinson. His salary was £250 per year.

== Protector of Aborigines ==
After arriving in Sydney in November 1838, Sievwright lived briefly with his wife, Christina, and their seven children in Melbourne. The whole family then moved to live among Aboriginal people in the Geelong area. This was on the edge of the area assigned to him, known as the Western District, covering about 40,000 km^{2} (15,000 sq mi). British and Irish settlers had begun arriving in the District about three years earlier, but at the time thousands of Aboriginal people still far outnumbered the Europeans.

As Protector of Aborigines, Sievwright was commissioned by the British government to represent the Aboriginal people, and to protect them "from cruelty, oppression and injustice" and "from encroachments upon their property".

In February 1841, Sievwright and his family moved further into his district to set up a new camp at Lake Keilambete, near present-day Terang. A year later, he moved to Mt Rouse, near present-day Penshurst, again urging the Aboriginal people of the district to join him. Sievwright's difficulties were considerable, not speaking any Aboriginal languages, and with most of the Aboriginal people in the colony coming into contact with Europeans for the first time. Nevertheless, at each of his camps he launched limited agricultural training programs in return for food, when traditional food supplies became scarcer as more European settlers arrived with sheep and cattle. At the same time, he launched a series of investigations into the killing of Aboriginal people.

His efforts to seek prosecutions of Europeans involved in killings made him extremely unpopular among the white settlers. One squatter recorded in his private journal that by February 1840, Sievwright had already become "the most unpopular man that ever breathed". Around the same time, the Port Phillip Gazette reported that Sievwright was "in very bad odour" with the squatters of the Western District. "These gentlemen, it appears, cut him upon all occasions, and will not suffer him to enter their houses."

In August 1842, Sievwright was told that he had been suspended without pay because of charges against his moral character, dating back to 1839. Port Phillip's Superintendent Charles La Trobe told NSW Governor George Gipps in Sydney that even if the charges against Sievwright were false, they had been "from the outset fatal to him and his recent career". Chief Protector Robinson had already backed a plan to sack Sievwright months earlier. Even before Sievwright learned of his suspension at Mt Rouse, it had been reported in Melbourne by the Port Phillip Gazette. At the same time, the Gazette referred to a threat by the colonial government to refuse squatting licences in part of the Western District where Sievwright had reported the recent murders of three Aboriginal women and a child. "There is still some doubt if the whole affair has not been exaggerated," it said.

After it became apparent that Sievwright's suspension was based at least in part on a letter written by his own wife in 1839, both she and their eldest daughter, Frances, wrote to La Trobe defending him. However, Sievwright remained suspended, and the family slipped into poverty. "Mr Sievwright's situation precluded him from making friends among the white population", a man called Frederic Nesbitt wrote to La Trobe. "Therefore they are now suffering the penalty of having done their duty to the Aborigines." Geelong Police Magistrate Nicholas Fenwick confirmed the family's plight, telling the Superintendent: "Nobody here it appears will give them anything on credit now that Mr Sievwright has been suspended, and how they manage to get their daily bread, nobody can tell, and their children are in rags".

In 1840, Sievwright repudiated Robinson's claim that "the Aboriginal natives are addicted to cannibalism". He described the process by which they dispose of their elderly dead by burning the corpses, but in the case of the bodies of their enemies, they preserve some small parts of the bodies as trophies of victory, and extract the fat to grease their weapons.

In London, Secretary of State for War and the Colonies, Edward Smith-Stanley, endorsed Gipps' recommendation that Sievwright be dismissed. "I should wish if possible to avoid pursuing this matter further, as it is not of a character fit for public investigation," he told the Governor. La Trobe and Gipps continued to reject Sievwright's demands for a full inquiry into the allegations that had led to his dismissal. They agreed only to two inquiries into subsequent claims raised in 1844 that he had misappropriated government stores. Sievwright told La Trobe he regretted to state that Chief Protector Robinson was his "openly declared enemy", and was withholding documentary evidence that would show the claims had no basis.

To further try to clear his name, Sievwright wrote a lengthy letter to the Geelong Advertiser, the voice of the Western District squatters. Over two days in February 1845, it devoted four broadsheet pages to Sievwright's letter. It incorporated correspondence relating to the Protectorate, his views on what he viewed as its maladministration by Robinson, and the failure of La Trobe to grant his demand for a full inquiry into his dismissal. "We cannot see a man crushed, as Mr Sievwright has been, without crying 'shame'. We confess that until these disclosures were made, we always entertained a strong prejudice against Mr Sievwright, and did not scruple to express it, and we are therefore glad of the opportunity to make reparation", the Advertiser commented.

In May 1845, Sievwright sailed from Melbourne to London, leaving his family in Melbourne, to put his case for an inquiry direct to the British government. He was still trying unsuccessfully at least as late as 1849.

== Personal life ==
On 3 April 1822 in Stirling, Scotland, he married Christina Watt. The couple had seven children: Frances 'Fanny' Anna (1823); Marcus (c. 1826); Charles (c. 1828); Frederica Christina (1830); Melita Ysobel (1830); Ada Georgina (1834); and Adolphus Falkland (1835).

He became deaf and blind before dying in London in September 1855. He was buried in an unmarked grave in Brompton Cemetery. Christina had died in Melbourne in 1854.

=== Family ===
Frances Sievwright went to Van Diemen's Land to work as a governess to Lady Pedder, wife of its first Chief Justice, Sir John Pedder. In Hobart, Fanny met and married London-born Anglican clergyman Arthur Davenport, who became the last government chaplain on Norfolk Island while it was still a convict settlement, and later Archdeacon of Holy Trinity Church in Hobart. Frances' twin sisters, Frederica and Melita, would also marry in Hobart – Frederica to bank manager, George Matson, and Melita to Henry Hill, later Superintendent of Police in Ballarat. Their youngest sister, Ada, married a solicitor, Stephen Clissold, before returning to England.

Marcus Sievwright would become a solicitor and live the rest of his life in Melbourne. Charles Sievwright junior worked as a station manager for two Western District squatters, Charles and Peter Manifold, before he died in 1851 after falling from a horse near Mt Leura, His brother, Adolphus, also died young. He was Superintendent of Mails in Melbourne when he died in 1868 of tuberculosis, aged just 33.

== Criminal investigations by Sievwright ==
- Crown prisoners John Davis and Abraham Brackbrook, assigned to work on William Boucher Bowerman's sheep station near the Julian Range deep in the Western District, were investigated by Sievwright for shooting dead two Aboriginal men early in 1839. The bodies were moved and burned. NSW Attorney-General John Hubert Plunkett declined to prosecute the men for murder. Instead, at their trial in Melbourne in August, Davis and Brackbrook faced two counts: burning the bodies with a view to defeating the ends of justice; and indecently burning the bodies "contrary to civilised usage". A jury found both defendants not guilty on both counts as self-defence was considered to have taken place.
- In September 1839, Sievwright charged Crown prisoners William Edwards and John Cooke with illegally keeping Aboriginal women in their hut. They were convicted in the Geelong Court, and sentenced to receive a punishment of 50 lashes each.
- Towards the end of 1839, Sievwright investigated the Murdering Gully massacre of 35 - 40 Djargurd Wurrung Aboriginal people, taking statements from surviving witnesses. Sievright complained to the Chief Protector that he had not been given transport help to make the month-long trip to the scene sooner, allowing the chief suspect, overseer Frederick Taylor, to abscond. "Had the means been at my disposal of making the investigation...at the time the report was first made to me, there is little doubt but that the individual, who has now escaped, would ere this have had to answer for his fiendish and inhuman conduct," he wrote. Taylor left Victoria for several years after the event, and was never prosecuted.
- In March 1840, Sievwright investigated the Fighting Hills massacre on a new frontier run on a tributary of the Wannon River recently taken up by English brothers - George, James, John, Pringle and William Whyte. They and their shepherds freely admitted between 30 and 80 Aborigines had been killed. In a subsequent clash involving the Whytes, also investigated by Sievwright, an unknown number of Aboriginal people died. However, Port Phillip's Crown Prosecutor, James Croke, declined to prosecute. He ruled that in both cases, the Aborigines appeared to have been the aggressors, making the conviction of the Whytes "very uncertain". As well, Sievwright should not have recorded their statements under oath. Such statements could not be used in evidence against them.
- Also in March 1840, Sievwright investigated a report of the killing of five Aboriginal people at the Tahara station of the Irish brothers, George, Samuel and Trevor Winter. The killings were said to be retaliation for attacking shepherds and carrying off some sheep. The Reverend Joseph Orton later noted in his journal:

"The alleged cause of the attack was the aggressions of the natives, in stealing sheep. The attack of the Europeans was equally atrocious and unjustifiable, the result of which was that according to the depositions at least five natives were killed. This occurrence was on a station of Winter’s who appears to have taken active part in the performance."

- In April 1840, Sievwright investigated two incidents involving servants of the Henty brothers. In one incident, a shepherd named Blood was accused of shooting an Aboriginal man in both legs, one of which was now in "a state of mortification". Sievwright issued a warrant for Blood's arrest, but he had absconded. In the other incident on the station of Francis Henty, three Aboriginal men had been shot dead. Again, all three suspects had absconded.
- Sandford George Bolden of Layton, "indicted for feloniously firing a pistol loaded with ball at an Aboriginal native".
- Richard Hill, charged as one of the principals in the murder of three Aboriginal women (one pregnant) and one male child at Muston's Creek on the 23 Feb, 1842 on Thomas Osbrey and Sidney Smith's leased ‘Caramut’ run. Two men, a woman and a child were wounded. It became known as the Lubra Creek massacre.
