= Mount William (Victoria) =

Mountain in Victoria, Australia

Mount William (Mount Duwil)
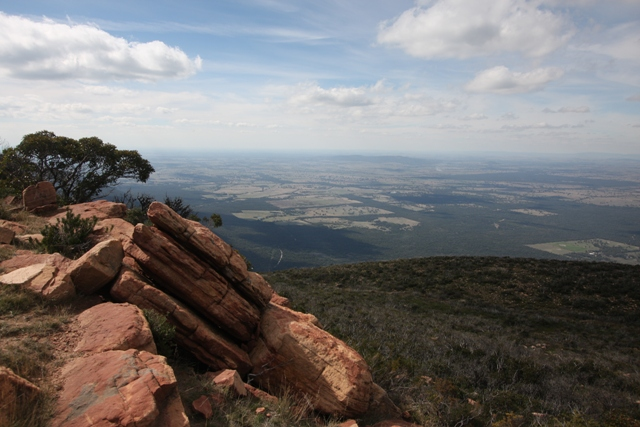
- Looking east from Mount William, towards Ararat

Highest point
- Elevation: 1,167 metres (3,829 ft) AHD
- Coordinates: 37°17′34″S 142°36′3″E

Geography
- Location within Victoria
- Location: Victoria, Australia
- Parent range: Grampians
- Topo map: Geoscience Australia Mount William

Climbing
- First ascent: Thomas Mitchell (European explorer)

Mount William (also Mount Duwil) is a mountain of the Grampians Mountain Range, located within the Grampians National Park, in the Australian state of Victoria. The mountain is situated approximately 250 kilometres (160 mi) west-northwest of Melbourne on the eastern edge of the national park, approximately 22 kilometres (14 mi) drive south from Halls Gap.

== Features and location ==
Mount William is the highest point within the Grampians National Park. Sir Thomas Mitchell reached the summit with a group of explorers in 1836. The first settler in the area was Horatio Wills, who established a sheep run at Mount William in 1840, and named nearby Mount Ararat, after which the town is named. His son, cricketer and Australian rules football pioneer Tom Wills, grew up as a lone white child among the Djab wurrung Aboriginal tribes of Mount William.

Three transmission towers are located at the summit of Mount William including an amateur radio repeater. A sealed service road continues to the summit, but is not accessible by vehicle to the general public.

Visitors to the mountain can drive to a carpark located approximately 920 metres (3,020 ft) up the mountain, before proceeding on foot for 1.8 kilometres (1.1 mi) to the summit. It will take a person of moderate fitness approximately 45 mins to walk. No permit is required to climb the mountain.

== Gallery ==
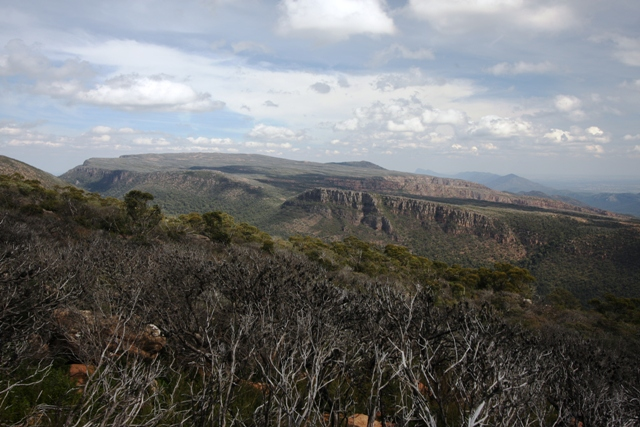
Western vantage from Mount William

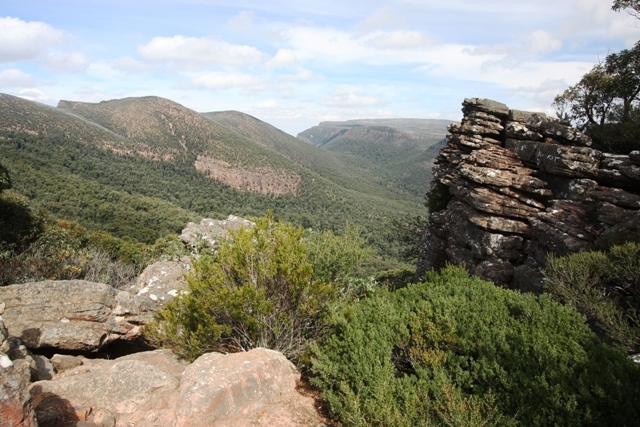
Western vantage from Mount William

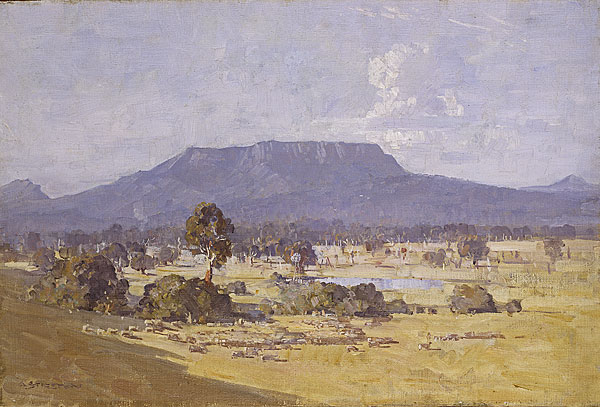
Mount William depicted in Arthur Streeton's 1926 painting Land of the Golden Fleece

== Climate ==
Due to being an exposed peak in the west of Victoria, Mount William features especially cool maximum temperatures throughout the year. Winter cloud cover is profound; with 26 days of precipitation in July, constituting an annual total of 215 days—quite possibly the highest figure of any site in mainland Australia.

Snowfalls are both frequent and heavy throughout the year. Daily maximum temperatures can struggle above the single digits even in summer, and on such days the afternoon and mid-day readings can be near to 0 °C (32 °F) in extreme cases such as in December 2022. The peak can be classed as a cold and moist Mediterranean climate (Köppen Csb) on account of the low summer rainfall − in February averaging only 32.2 millimetres (1.27 in) of rain.

Climate data for Grampians (Mount William, 2005–2024); 1,150 m AMSL; 37.30° S, 142.60° E
Month	Jan	Feb	Mar	Apr	May	Jun	Jul	Aug	Sep	Oct	Nov	Dec	Year
Record high °C (°F)	36.6 (97.9)	36.6 (97.9)	32.2 (90.0)	26.1 (79.0)	18.0 (64.4)	13.4 (56.1)	12.1 (53.8)	16.1 (61.0)	20.6 (69.1)	27.0 (80.6)	32.1 (89.8)	34.9 (94.8)	36.6 (97.9)
Mean daily maximum °C (°F)	21.3 (70.3)	20.1 (68.2)	17.3 (63.1)	12.5 (54.5)	8.3 (46.9)	5.8 (42.4)	5.1 (41.2)	5.8 (42.4)	8.8 (47.8)	12.7 (54.9)	15.8 (60.4)	18.3 (64.9)	12.7 (54.7)
Mean daily minimum °C (°F)	10.2 (50.4)	9.5 (49.1)	8.4 (47.1)	6.0 (42.8)	3.6 (38.5)	1.8 (35.2)	1.0 (33.8)	1.3 (34.3)	2.3 (36.1)	4.0 (39.2)	6.3 (43.3)	7.7 (45.9)	5.2 (41.3)
Record low °C (°F)	0.9 (33.6)	1.0 (33.8)	−0.1 (31.8)	−1.2 (29.8)	−2.1 (28.2)	−2.6 (27.3)	−4.1 (24.6)	−2.9 (26.8)	−3.8 (25.2)	−3.3 (26.1)	−2.5 (27.5)	−0.5 (31.1)	−4.1 (24.6)
Average precipitation mm (inches)	66.1 (2.60)	32.2 (1.27)	54.3 (2.14)	82.9 (3.26)	127.7 (5.03)	143.1 (5.63)	175.4 (6.91)	151.1 (5.95)	118.9 (4.68)	94.1 (3.70)	75.1 (2.96)	61.8 (2.43)	1,177.4 (46.35)
Average precipitation days (≥ 0.2 mm)	9.3	11.3	14.6	18.3	22.2	24.5	25.6	23.9	21.1	17.1	15.3	11.9	215.1
Source: Australian Bureau of Meteorology; Grampians (Mount William)

== See also ==
- List of mountains in Australia § Victoria
- Pomonal, Victoria
