= Avoca Homestead Complex =

- Location within New South Wales Location within Australia
- 33°55′42″S 141°58′21″E
- Location: 1122a Low Darling Road, Wentworth, Wentworth Shire, New South Wales, Australia

History
- Built: 1871–1879

New South Wales Heritage Register
- Official name: Avoca Homestead Complex; Avoca Station Homestead and outbuildings
- Type: State heritage (complex / group)
- Designated: 8 April 2016
- Reference no.: 1971
- Type: Homestead Complex
- Category: Farming and Grazing

The Avoca Homestead Complex is a heritage-listed former station homestead and station facilities which was used for catered accommodation and visitor attraction. It is on the west bank of the Darling River near Wentworth, in the Far West region of New South Wales, Australia. It was built between 1871 and 1879. It was added to the New South Wales State Heritage Register on 8 April 2016. The original 1871 half of the homestead destroyed by fire in May 2024. New owners have purchased the property in May 2025 with plans to commence the clean-up and restoration of the 1879 building which remains.

== History ==
There is an extensive and rich archaeological heritage that documents Aboriginal occupation of the lower Darling and Murray River areas. The earliest dates for Aboriginal occupation in the local region date back some 45,000 years, and there are numerous locations along the Murray and Darling Rivers that contain evidence of Aboriginal occupation from around 20,000 years ago up to the present. In 1829 the Government of New South Wales dispatched an exploratory party to trace the Murrumbidgee River under the leadership of Charles Sturt. Sturt, the first European to venture into the Murray - Darling region, followed the Murrumbidgee to its junction with a larger stream, then followed this larger stream (the Murray River) to its junction with the Darling River. Sturt encountered large numbers of Aboriginal people near the Murray/Darling junction, but his expedition featured generally peaceful, though wary, meetings and interactions. Subsequent expeditions, like that led by Major Thomas Mitchell in 1836, were marred by violence. In 1836 Mitchell commenced his 3rd expedition into the interior of Australia with the aim of completing a survey of the Darling River. Between Euston and Mildura, at a location now known as Mt Dispersion, the exploratory group were followed by a group of up to 180 Aborigines. Mitchell organised an ambush and at least seven Aborigines were killed, and 70 or 80 shots fired.

In 1838 Joseph Hawdon and Charles Bonney, the first of the "overlanders", drove cattle from New South Wales to Adelaide along the northern bank of the Murray River, crossing the lower Darling River en route. Other overlanders began to follow the same route, and the Murray/Darling junction became an established camp site known as Hawdon's Ford. The settlement was later referred to as the Darling Junction. Small scale conflicts between overlanders and Aboriginal people developed as more and more overlanders passed through, grazed and damaged the traditional lands of the Paakantyi/Barkindji and Maraura peoples. The conflicts with overlanders escalated, culminating in the infamous 1841 Rufus River massacre, at Lake Victoria, where some 35 Aborigines were shot by Police and overlanders.

Conflict between Aboriginal people and overlanders/pastoralists slowed after this massacre, Aboriginal people were dispossessed of their lands, and were forced to join the workforce of the expanding pastoral industry. In the 1840s squatters became established over the land along the Darling and Murray Rivers; they gradually expanded their holdings westwards from the Murrumbidgee and north eastwards from South Australia.

The Wentworth town site was approved in 1859 and was named after the New South Wales explorer and politician William Charles Wentworth on 21 June 1859. It was in this context that, in 1871, Daniel H. Cudmore purchased the western half of Tapio Station on the Darling from Messrs. Menzies and Douglas, and is said to have named it Avoca after his father's hometown in Ireland. (However, his father, Daniel M.P. Cudmore, was from Limerick, Ireland). Cudmore initially built a pine log homestead and, seven years later, added an adjoining stone extension.

A brief timeline of subsequent events at Avoca is as follows:

- 1876 Daniel M.P. Cudmore purchased Popiltah, combining it with Avoca to give an area of 1,100 sq. miles.
- 1880 Avoca and Popiltah Stations were transferred to Daniel M.P. Cudmore sons: Milo and Arthur took ownership of Popiltah; Daniel H. Cudmore remained on Avoca.
- 1885 The combined area of land managed by the Cudmore brothers (Daniel Henry, Milo Robert and Arthur) was some 709,000 acres.
- 1895 Daniel H. Cudmore leaves Avoca, building and retiring to a prominent residence (Adare House) at Victor Harbor, S.A. in 1895. Arthur Cudmore moves from Popiltah, and takes up residence at Avoca.
- 1902 Milo and Arthur Cudmore applied for a Western Lands Lease over Avoca Station. This leased commenced on 27.6.1905.
- 1911 Avoca advertised for sale; lease transferred to A.F. (Arthur) Cudmore, R.F. Roberts and H.C. Drew.
- 1915 Lease transferred to Ben Chaffey.
- 1917 Lease transferred to Ben Chaffey and R.E. Hope
- 1918 R.E. Hope purchased Avoca from Chaffey, worked it in conjunction with Para Station, owned by Hope family since 1867.
- 1935 Lease transferred to R.E. Hope and Sons.
- 1947 Avoca and Para Stations purchased by John Parker; then transferred to Avoca Para Pty Ltd.
- 1968 Mary (Parker) and Alan Christopher Dawes took up Avoca Holding (27,000 acres of Avoca and 48,000 acres of Para); W.J. Parker retained Central Para (86,000 acres).
- 1974 W.J. Parker sold his holding, a year before the 99-year period expired. One-third was surrendered to the Western Lands Commission. A.C. & M.J. Dawes granted 99-year lease on the combined Avoca-Para (86,000 acres)
- 1984 Dawes family purchased the adjoining Dunvegan Station (32,000 acres), taken up by son David Dawes and wife Dr Elizabeth Mickan.
- 2000 Ian and Barbara Law purchased the 40-hectare Avoca homestead and outbuildings. Robert Lochhead purchased 12,500 hectares of adjoining land, including part of Avoca, at the same time. In 2024 the original pine log part of the homestead was destroyed by fire.
- 2025 Zac and Tiffany Martin purchased the 40-hectare property as is, including all outbuildings, with plans to commence the clean-up and restore what remains of the 1879 stone building.

Avoca was primarily a sheep grazing property, and was initially run in association with the neighbouring Popiltah Station. The homestead complex was the hub of the station, providing accommodation and facilities for the pastoral operations. 120,000 sheep were shorn at Avoca in 1888 with new Wolseley shearing machines. The wool clip was transported by paddle steamer from the woolshed downstream via the Darling River to the Murray River. Daniel H. Cudmore developed the station and installed pumps to irrigate lucerne and other fodder crops adjacent to the homestead. Parts of the irrigation system were established early, and irrigation is mentioned in records in the 1880s. Large timber plugs in the collection in the office were for controlling water flow through pipes in the earth banks. The Mildura Irrigation Colony (Victoria, 1887) and the Curlwaa irrigation scheme did not commence until after Avoca was established and Avoca may represent one of the earliest irrigation systems on the Murray/Darling.

Daniel H. Cudmore was a leader in the Wentworth region in the 1870s and 1880s. He was honorary magistrate, and served as sheriff of the county and chairman of the Wentworth District Council and Agricultural Society, helped fund construction of the State Heritage Registered St John's Anglican Churchin Wentworth, and paid its vicar. His obituary includes the following details:

'Daniel Henry Cudmore (1844-1913) acquired Avoca Station in 1870, with frontages of ten miles (16 km) to the Murray and twenty-five miles (40 km) to the Darling. He was fascinated by technology and spent many thousands draining the Darling's anabranch, making water storages and erecting fences. On 20 February 1872 at Glen Osmond, he had married Harriet Garrett Smedley who bore him two sons and a daughter before her death on 16 March 1879. On 15 November 1882 he married Martha Earle McCracken, by whom he had another four sons, the second of these being Sir Collier Robert Cudmore (1885-1971), who won a gold medal for rowing at the 1908 Olympics and was long prominent in South Australian politics.

Besides their numerous progeny (used as dummies in the free-selection era), the Cudmores (Daniel and brother James) left two abiding legacies: the improvements they effected on their Yongala and Riverland leaseholds paved the way for the later success of numerous small-holders; and their great houses, Tara, Avoca, Claremont, Paringa Hall, Popiltah and Adare, though now bereft of the elaborate formal gardens which once graced them, are still a wonder to behold.' (Australian Dictionary of Biography).

Avoca was home to Sara Kathleen de Lacy Roberts (née Cudmore) as a teenager and young adult from 1895 until her marriage in 1909. She was educated at boarding school in Melbourne and travelled to and from school via train and the paddle steamer, Trafalgar. Her recollections of Avoca, when she was 88 years old in 1971, were as follows:

'One cook, one housemaid one nurse at Popiltah. No Aborigines in the house at Popiltah, one at Avoca. A camp of 30 as stockmen. There was a staff of 10 men at Avoca, jackaroo and overseer. Bred horses there - had about 100. Every second year, one of the men spent two or three months breaking in - always gently. The Avoca vegetable garden was on the river. A huge steam engine, between the vegetable and flower gardens, pumped river water to them. In the hot weather this was done at night and made a terrible noise. A Chinaman worked full time on these gardens and would come to the kitchen door every morning to enquire on what vegetables were required that day. All the linen was made at Avoca, the girls spending their time sewing, making visitors beds and preserving.'.

The Cudmore family is also associated with Nanya's people, the last group of Aborigines living traditionally in the Scotia country west of Popiltah; they were encouraged to move in from the backblocks by Harry Mitchell and other Aboriginal station workers in 1893. Arthur Cudmore of Popiltah, Daniel's brother, presented a paper on the group at the Fifth Meeting of Australasian Association for the Advancement of Science (Adel) 1894. Arthur Cudmore's daughter, Sara Kathleen, witnessed Nanya's group merger with pastoralism. She made invaluable observations of their hunting practices and on their integration into the Cudmore's station operations:

'The young men of the tribe became expert stockmen and were employed by Cudmore Bros. on the station for some years. Especially after the colt breaking was finished they would be given the newly broken horses to ride and were kind and adept at handling them'.

Between 1915 and 1918 Avoca was owned by Ben Chaffey, son of George Chaffey, co-founder of the Mildura irrigation colony in 1887, as part of his portfolio of stations along the Murray and lower Darling (Tolarno, Moorara, Moorna, Bunnerungie, Tapio, and Garnpung).

== Description ==
Avoca is located on the west bank of the Darling River. Along the main road and the entrance drive are irrigated paddocks and banks that now extend over ca. 300 hectares. The station group is laid out along the river bank with the homestead at the south and outbuildings extending to the north. The buildings are generally oriented towards the river. The original woolshed was located some 3 km to the south near Tapio Station woolshed, and is reputed to have been burnt down during a shearers uprising.

The homestead faces south east looking over a bend in the river with a lawn in front of the house. The approach road is from the southwest and passes the tennis court that is to the west of the homestead. The homestead was built in two stages, the second seven years later and slightly taller than the first stage. Both wings are similar in form and are adjacent to each other. Both have a typical four square plan with a central hall and two main rooms on each side and smaller rooms at the rear. These abut side -by-side with a cross corridor between rooms to allow access from one building to the other. They both have hipped M-shaped roofs with central valleys and narrow boxed in eaves and are now clad in corrugated iron. They have encircling verandahs with stop chamfered timber columns and shallow concave curved corrugated iron roofs set down and separate from the main roofs. Both have two double brick chimneys with corbelled decoration, added later to the originally simple first stage chimneys.

The first stage of the homestead was constructed in 1871 of cypress pine drop logs and the second, in 1879, of stone. The materials are understood to have been sourced from the property. The drop log building is painted dark brown. The windows are double hung with each sash divided into six panes and with moulded timber external architraves. The front door in a four panelled timber door. The verandah is now gauzed in and there is a modern flat roofed addition to the east with large glass sliding doors. The first stage has plastered walls (the construction is not known) and beaded edge boarded ceilings with simple timber mouldings at the wall junction. The main rooms have black stone mantelpieces, the material is not clear as some of the marbled pattern appears to be painted. There is a rear addition to the first stage with the external walls in face brick laid in English common bond and with a hipped corrugated iron roof. The interior walls and ceiling have unpainted timber lining boards.

The second stage of the homestead is random coursed limestone, tuck pointed, with dressed stone quoins at corners and around the openings. The openings have a vermiculated keystone. These are now painted white but appear to be sandstone. The windows are double hung with each sash divided vertically into two panes. The front door has glazed sidelights and highlights and the door has glazed top panels with a semi-circular head. Internally the walls are plastered and the ceilings are lath and plaster with deep decorative plaster cornices and elaborate ceiling roses. The main rooms have timber mantlepieces with decorative brackets to the mantle shelf. Both stages have panelled timber doors and moulded skirtings and architraves, all painted.

At the rear of the main homestead are a series of drop log ancillary buildings that are believed to have all been built together in 1871. They include a kitchen wing (now part laundry, part cool room, part store), a second and separate kitchen wing with bakehouse, cooks and maids quarters, jackaroo's quarters and office. The buildings are generally gabled in form and some gables have weatherboards and a scalloped bargeboard; they are generally lined with timber boards and some have later pressed metal or ply lining. Several have coffered ceilings with lining at an angle under the rafters and under level the collar ties. There is a cellar under the jackaroo's quarters. The office has a timber counter and mantelpiece and houses a collection of relics and Aboriginal artefacts. There is a timber framed and gauzed meat house and a timber framed and corrugated iron clad laundry and corrugated iron clad wash house.

At the rear is an underground reinforced concrete tank for house rainwater with a low conical roof and an estimated capacity of 40,000 litres (8,800 imp gal; 11,000 US gal). Rainwater is piped from the house to the tank. Most of the gutters and pipes have been replaced with modern profile items. Nearby on the river is an old corrugated iron pump house which had a belt driven pump to draw water from the river. The machinery plinth remains in the shed and the masonry walls to the river. The belt used to run between the walls.

Outside the homestead yard and to the north along the river is a series of outbuildings. These include a store, which is a rectangular timber building with a corrugated iron clad gabled roof with the ridge running north - south. The building is timber framed and weatherboard clad with decorative scalloped bargeboards to the gables and finials and a timber floor. It has a skillion form verandah on the east part enclosed in drop board (slab) construction. There are two stages of skillion addition to the west and a matching gable form addition to the north. It has timber boarded ledged and braced doors.

To the north is the stable/coach shed. It is similar to the store but taller and has an internal frame of larger section timber. External stairs lead to upper level doors in the south gable and these open into a "hay loft" at the south. The window opening in the north gable is enclosed. The weatherboard clad gables have scalloped bargeboards and finials. There are skillion additions to the west and north. The structure has been altered and the phases of development are not clear. The frame is sawn timber and most of the walls are weatherboard and some are drop board or slab (former stable area); this area also has a wood "cobbled" floor. The east wall has a row of windows of varying configuration.

The gardener's cottage is on the river halfway between the homestead and mess/kitchen building. The cottage is a 4-room construction with a small enclosed verandah facing the river. The external walls are a combination of drop board, weatherboards and more recently hardboard. The roof is corrugated iron. The weatherboard clad gables have scalloped bargeboards. There is a brick chimney and a recent mud brick wall that encloses the outside toilet. Inside the kitchen is lined with ripple iron on the walls and ceilings. The other rooms are lined with pressed metal ceiling or ply lining.

A small single room shed is adjacent to the gardener's cottage. It has weatherboard cladding, scalloped bargeboard and a corrugated iron gable form roof with finials. The weatherboards have been partly removed on both sides and the building converted into a carport.

Between the gardener's cottage and the mess/kitchen building are an orchard and vegetable garden and ornamental plantings adjacent to the path along the river. Orchards also extend to the southwest of the homestead. Near the gardener's cottage and on the river bank is a corrugated iron shed housing a pump that was installed for irrigation in 1963; before 1963 a steam driven pump existed on this site. Adjacent are reinforced concrete settling tanks on the ground and elevated tanks on a metal stand.

Further north and set closer to the river is a rectangular building of drop log construction with sawn posts and round cypress pine logs. The roof ridge runs north–south and has gable ends and a brick chimney at each end. This was a mess/kitchen building with lounge room, mess room and kitchen with a deep fireplace for cooking. A metal flue remains and appears to have been for associated with a fuel stove. A verandah is on the east (river) side and part of the west side, and its roof is set down from the main roof. The verandah may have continued for the full length of the west side but the west side of the building has sagged, posts have collapsed and a number of the drop logs have fallen from the wall. The building is lined internally with beaded edge pine lining boards including along the rafters and then under the collar ties giving a coffered ceiling. The gables above the chimneys are clad in weatherboards and there is a scalloped bargeboard to the gables and the verandah ends. The verandah posts are square and sawn with chamfered corners. One post has a chiselled number in Roman numerals. The fascias have a beaded edge and a scotia mould that would have been under the missing gutters.

There are three doors on each side, three windows on the east and two on the west. They are not all intact but were timber boarded doors and the windows were timber with multi-paned sashes. There are internal moulded architraves. There are central ceiling roses in each room with perforated metal and a circular timber surround. The mantlepieces are timber and the hearths are brick and the floor is tongue and groove timber boarded.

=== Condition ===
In May 2024 the 1871 parts of the building were destroyed by fire. The rear ancillary buildings and jackaroo's quarters over the cellar were damaged. The 1879 stone build which includes 2 bedrooms, a bathroom, lounge and dining area still remains with minor smoke and fire damage. Slight vandalism occurred throughout the 6 months of abandonment.

The store and stable/coach shed are generally in fair condition with the exception of some missing walls and detached roof bracing (stable).

The mess/kitchen building is in poor condition and the west wall has partly collapsed. This appears to be the result of the collapse of the stumps and or base of the posts. The building needs temporary propping to prevent collapse and then restumping and restoration of the drop log wall.

The gardener's cottage is in fair condition, however it is not currently used for accommodation. The small shed adjacent to the gardener's cottage is in poor condition; weatherboards have been partly removed on both sides the structure has minor damage from branches falling from adjacent trees.

The Avoca Homestead complex maintains high integrity, with most buildings in good to fair condition, apart from the mess/kitchen which is poorly maintained and requires stabilisation. The complex does not include the original woolshed, which was located 3 kilometres (1.9 mi) to the south and has been destroyed. The complex does not include the single men's quarters; these are on an adjacent landholding and have been modified.

=== Modifications and dates ===
Homestead: The homestead was built in two stages, The first stage (1871) is constructed of cypress pine drop logs. There is a rear addition to the first stage with the external walls in face brick laid in English common bond and with a hipped corrugated iron roof. The verandah is now gauzed in and there is a modern flat roofed addition to the east with large glass sliding doors.

The stage one pine log homestead, ancillary buildings, office, stable/coach shed, mess/kitchen and singlemen's quarters are believed to have all been built together in 1871.

The second stage stone wing of the homestead was added in 1879 and is slightly taller than the first stage. Both stages of the homestead have two double brick chimneys with corbelled decoration, added later to the originally simple first stage chimneys.

Mess/kitchen: A verandah remains on the east (river) side and part of the west side. It may have continued on the west but the west side of the building has sagged and partly collapsed.

Stable/coach shed: There are skillion additions to the west and north. The structure has been altered and the phases of development are not clear.

== Heritage listing ==
As at 12 June 2015, Avoca Homestead Complex was established in the 1870s. It is set amidst mature red gum woodland on the western banks of the Darling River. It preserves a pastoral building complex of early timber and stone construction which is remarkably intact and with high integrity. The homestead complex is of state historic significance as it clearly illustrates the development of similar pastoral homesteads in the lower Darling River and the Western Division of NSW over time. Developed in two stages, the earliest homestead wing is of modest drop log construction. The later wing uses more expensive and lavish materials such as limestone and sandstone and a more sophisticated use of architectural detail, demonstrating the increasing confidence and positive fortunes of the pastoral venture. The complex is of state significance for its aesthetic values as a rare, extensive and intact homestead and outbuildings, including the original kitchen and cooks quarters, office, jackaroo's quarters, gardener's cottage, store, stable/coach shed and mess/kitchen, all set in their original riverside setting.

The Avoca Homestead complex maintains high integrity and the buildings are largely in good condition, though several require immediate maintenance. The complex does not include the woolshed (originally located 3 km to the south, now destroyed), nor the single men's quarters and irrigation manager's residence, which are on an adjacent landholding and have been modified.

The state heritage significance of Avoca homestead complex is enhanced through its association with the noted pioneering pastoralist family, the Cudmore family, who owned numerous properties in SA and NSW and held Avoca from 1871 to 1915. Avoca was established by Daniel H. Cudmore and run in association with another family property, Popiltah Station, on the Anabranch. The Cudmore family is associated with the Nanya Aboriginal family group, the last Aboriginal people who continued to live traditionally in the back country of NSW despite the encroachment of white settlement. In 1893, after living apart from the Maraura people of the Lower Darling for over thirty years, Nanya and his family of 29 people came in to Popiltah Station, and the Cudmore family provided firsthand accounts of this historic event.

Avoca Homestead Complex was listed on the New South Wales State Heritage Register on 8 April 2016 having satisfied the following criteria.

The place is important in demonstrating the course, or pattern, of cultural or natural history in New South Wales.

Avoca Homestead Complex is of state heritage significance for its historic values. Avoca homestead was established in the early 1870s with an initial modest drop log building and outbuildings. Drop log buildings were common in the lower Murray Darling region in the 19th century, particularly in areas where Murray pine was plentiful. Drop log buildings were cheap and were used for a wide range of buildings, including homesteads, quarters and woolsheds.

The more costly, lavish and substantial limestone and sandstone extension to the homestead, built soon afterwards, departed from this pattern of cheap construction methods. The stone extension to the homestead illustrates the history of development of pastoral homesteads in the Lower Darling and Western Division over time and reflects the pastoralists increasing aspirations, prosperity and confidence in the land in the 19th century.

The complexes of outbuildings have common designs such as drop board walls, weatherboard clad gables, scalloped bargeboards and finials. These also depart from earlier utilitarian drop log construction methods, and indicate growing confidence in the pastoral industry.

The place has a strong or special association with a person, or group of persons, of importance of cultural or natural history of New South Wales's history.

The state heritage significance of Avoca homestead complex is enhanced through its association with the noted pioneering pastoralist family, the Cudmore family, who owned numerous properties in SA and NSW and held Avoca from 1871 to 1915. Avoca was established by Daniel H. Cudmore and run in association with another family property, Popiltah Station, on the Anabranch. The Cudmores owned a number of stations neighbouring Avoca, and elsewhere in NSW, Victoria and SA. They established prominent homesteads at properties including Tara, Claremont, Popiltah, as well as renowned houses (Paringa Hall, Adelaide, and Adare House, Victor Harbor).

Daniel H. Cudmore was a leading member of the Wentworth community; an honorary magistrate, sheriff of the county and chairman of the Wentworth District Council and Agricultural Society, he helped fund the construction of St John's Church (on the State Heritage Register) in Wentworth and also paid its vicar.

The Cudmore family also have a significant association with Aboriginal people. In 1893, after living apart from the Maraura people of the Lower Darling for over thirty years, Nanya and his family of 29 people, the last Aboriginal people to live traditionally in the back country of NSW despite the encroachment of white settlement, came in to Cudmore's Popiltah Station. Arthur Cudmore wrote the first account of the group, presented to the Australian Association for the Advancement of Science (Adelaide) in 1894. His daughter, Sara Kathleen, also wrote details on the return of Nanya, their traditional hunting methods and the integration of some of the younger men into station life.

The place is important in demonstrating aesthetic characteristics and/or a high degree of creative or technical achievement in New South Wales.

The visual and aesthetic impact of the extensive complex is of state significance as it consists of a well preserved drop log and stone homestead, unusual in the region, in a setting beside the Darling River amidst a mature red gum woodland. The location is on the elevated bank of the river, above flood level.

The complex features various construction methods; drop logs are used in the earlier wing of the homestead, jackaroos quarters, office and mess/kitchen, all constructed from local Murray pine. The stable/coach shed, store, gardeners cottage, shed have similar drop board walls, weatherboard clad gables, scalloped bargeboards and finials.

The place has potential to yield information that will contribute to an understanding of the cultural or natural history of New South Wales.

Daniel H Cudmore was an early innovator in water management and established irrigation areas around the homestead. This early establishment of irrigation is of state heritage significance as it may provide an opportunity for research on the history of water management and irrigation on the Darling and Murray Rivers.

The place possesses uncommon, rare or endangered aspects of the cultural or natural history of New South Wales.

The complex has state heritage significance as a rare and extensive grouping of drop log and drop board constructed homestead and ancillary buildings. The second limestone wing of the homestead with dressed stone quoins at corners and around the openings is a rare feature in the region, and demonstrates growth in affluence and success.

The place is important in demonstrating the principal characteristics of a class of cultural or natural places/environments in New South Wales.

The homestead complex is of state heritage significance as it offers an example of drop log and drop board (slab) construction and exemplifies a wide range of types of early (1870-80s) station buildings that were once common across the western part of the state. It is also representative of the growth and development of large pastoral stations from humble pioneering beginnings to prosperous and confident enterprises as demonstrated in the changing construction techniques and architectural style of the buildings.
