= Barmera (disambiguation) =

Barmera is a town and locality in South Australia.

Barmera may also refer to.

- Barmera is the official alternative name for Lake Bonney Riverland, a lake in South Australia
- District Council of Barmera, a former local government area in South Australia
- Barmera railway line, a former railway line in South Australia

== See also ==
- Berri Barmera Council
- Barmera-Monash Football Club
