= Ngintait =

Aboriginal Australian people

The Ngintait, or Ngindadj, are an Australian Aboriginal peoples of the northwest corner of the state of Victoria, and partly in South Australia. Nine people, all of one family, claim descent from the tribe, which was dispersed in the 19th century.

== Language ==
The Ngintait language belonged to the Lower Murray languages and is often classified as a dialect of Yuyu.

== Country ==
The Ngintait's territory extended over 2,400 square miles (6,200 km^{2}), mainly around the southern bank of the Murray River. It covered the area above Paringa in south Australia, to near Mildura in Victoria. Its southern boundaries reached down some 50 miles from the Murray. Their tribal lands encompassed Ned's Corner and also the Salt Creek area of New South Wales. Jaraldekalt informants of the anthropologist Ronald Berndt and his wife Catherine that the area defined by Norman Tindale as Ngintait territory was actually dwelt in by the Erawirung, and located the Ngintait further away from the Murray.

== History ==
According to Darren Perry, the former chair of the Murray Lower Darling Rivers Indigenous Nations, and the only person tracing his and his family of nine's origins to the Ngintait, the original Ngintait clans were dispersed during the guerilla wars of the early 1840s about the Rufus River.

== Native title ==
The Ngintait, as represented by Perry, have made a claim for native title claiming they have custodian obligations to the rich native burial grounds in their area.

== Alternative names ==
- Inteck
- Merri (referring to their language)
- Nutcha
- Takadok

== Some words ==
- Broolach (kangaroo)
- nutchaa (mother)
- ruchaa (father)
- thougha (white man)
- wilking (tame dog)

== Sources ==
- Barker, A D; Caughley, Graeme (June 1994). "Distribution and Abundance of Kangaroos (Marsupalia: Macropodidae) at the Time of European Contact: South Australia". Australian Mammalogy. 17: 73–84. doi:10.1071/AM94008.
- Berndt, Ronald Murray; Berndt, Catherine Helen; Stanton, John E. (1993). A World that was: The Yaraldi of the Murray River and the Lakes, South Australia. UBC Press. ISBN 978-0-774-80478-3.
- Brown, A. R. (July–December 1918). "Notes on the Social Organization of Australian Tribes". The Journal of the Royal Anthropological Institute of Great Britain and Ireland. 48: 222–253. doi:10.2307/2843422. JSTOR 2843422.
- Inquiry into the establishment and effectiveness of registered Aboriginal parties. Environment and Natural Resources Committee, Parliament of Victoria. 4 June 2012. pp. 180–183. ISBN 978-0-708-10741-6.
- Mathews, R. H. (1898). "Group divisions and initiation ceremonies of the Barkungee tribes". Journal of the Proceedings of the Royal Society of New South Wales. 32: 241–255. doi:10.5962/p.359301. S2CID 259756893.
- Pegler, A. H. (1886). "Ned's Corner Station, Murray River". In Curr, Edward Micklethwaite (ed.). The Australian race: its origin, languages, customs, place of landing in Australia and the routes by which it spread itself over the continent (PDF). Vol. 2. Melbourne: J. Ferres. pp. 280–181.
- Tindale, Norman Barnett (1974). "Ngintait (SA)". Aboriginal Tribes of Australia: Their Terrain, Environmental Controls, Distribution, Limits, and Proper Names. Australian National University Press. ISBN 978-0-708-10741-6.
- Wafer, Jim; Lissarrague, Amanda; Harkins, Jean (2008). A Handbook of Aboriginal Languages of New South Wales and the Australian Capital Territory. Muurrbay Aboriginal Language and Culture Co-operative. ISBN 978-0-977-53518-7.
- White, Daniella (23 January 2017). "Perry hurt in crash". Sunraysia Daily.
