= Barmera =

Barmera South Australia
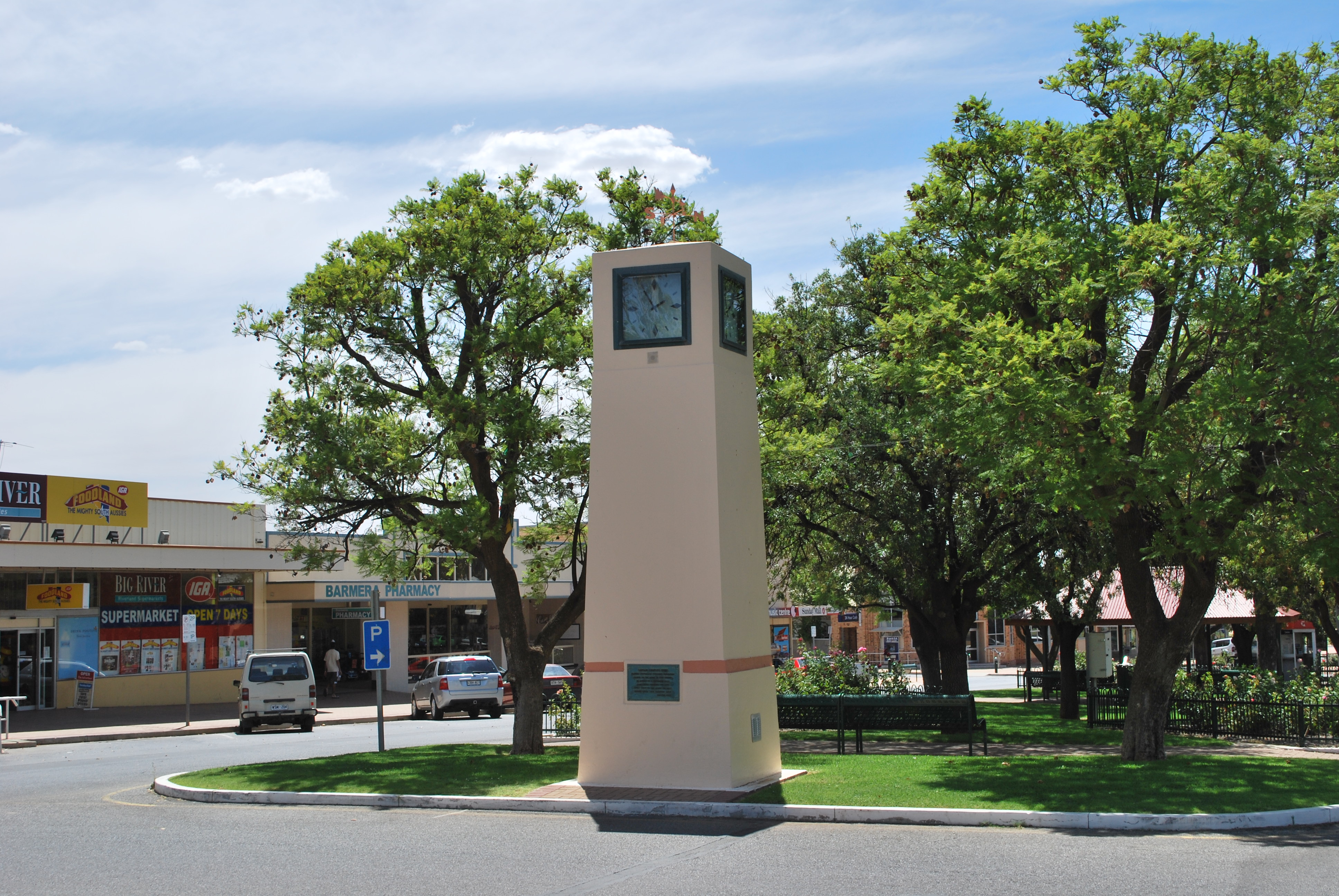
- The Charles Sturt centenary clock tower, built in 1944

- Coordinates: 34°15′S 140°28′E
- Population: 1,895 (UCL 2021)
- Established: 1859
- Location: 221 km (137 mi) NE of Adelaide
- LGA(s): Berri Barmera Council
- State electorate(s): Chaffey
- Federal division(s): Barker

Barmera (/ˈbɑːrmərə/ BAR-mə-rə) is a town in the Riverland region of South Australia. It is on the Sturt Highway A20, 220 kilometres north-east of Adelaide, the capital of the state of South Australia. It is primarily an agricultural and viticultural town and is located on Lake Bonney Riverland, a freshwater lake.

== History ==
The original inhabitants were the Barmerara Meru clan of the Ngawadj people. It is not known where the name "Barmera" comes from but it is suspected that it means "water place" or "land dwellers", being a word from the local Aboriginal group. Others postulate it comes from Barmeedjie, the name of the tribe that lived to the north of the Murray River prior to European settlement.

Lake Bonney was first seen by Charles Bonney and Joseph Hawdon in 1838 drove cattle along the Murray River. The land however, was settled in 1859 with the establishment of Overland Corner Hotel. It was a popular area with drovers that drove sheep from New South Wales into South Australia. A police station was also built to prevent and stop arguments between the aboriginal people and settlers.

An irrigation system was established in the town in 1921. The town became gazetted. An influx of World War I veterans settled with promises of irrigated land from the government. A railway station was opened in 1928 and the town was proclaimed in the same year. In World War II an internment camp was established south of Barmera in Loveday and was one of the largest World War II camps in Australia.

== Heritage listings ==
Barmera has a number of heritage-listed sites, including:

- 2-4 Barwell Avenue: Bonney Theatre
- 2 Fowles Street: Barmera Irrigation Office
- North Lake Road: Napper's Accommodation House Ruins

== Railway ==
Barmera was served by the Barmera railway line from 1928 until 1990.

== Climate and geography ==
Barmera exists in a semi-arid location, north of Goyder's Line. Barmera is surrounded by mallee scrub. It is 29 metres above sea level. Barmera has a dry climate with hot summers and warm days and cold frosty nights in winter with seasonal temperatures a few degrees above Adelaide's temperatures and similar to those of Berri. The weather patterns are similar to those of Berri. It receives less than 250 mm of rain per annum. Rain patterns shift from year to year over a nineteen-year cycle.

Floods in 2022.

== Present day ==
Barmera is in the land of the Ngaiawang, Ngawait, Nganguruku, Erawirung, Ngintait, Ngaralte and Ngarkat traditional owners and is in the Berri Barmera Council local government area, the South Australian House of Assembly electoral district of Chaffey and the Australian House of Representatives Division of Barker.

Lake Bonney has sandy beaches, a jetty, fishing and sailing. Every Easter, a sailing regatta is held on Lake Bonney and a country music festival is held every June. Riverland Field Days are held in September a Show is held in March. The town is home to the sporting teams Barmera/Monash Roos Football Club and the Barmera United Soccer Club.

== See also ==
- Murray River Crossings
