= Ngawait =

Aboriginal Australian people

The Ngawait, also spelt Ngawadj and other variations, and also known as Eritark and other names, were an Aboriginal Australian people of the mid-Riverland region, spanning the Murray River in South Australia. They have sometimes been referred to as part of the Meru people, a larger grouping which could also include the Ngaiawang and Erawirung peoples. There were at least two clans or sub-groups of the Ngawait people, the Barmerara Meru and Muljulpero maru.

== Country ==
In Norman Tindale's estimation, the Ngawait had approximately 1,600 square miles (4,100 km^{2}) of tribal land. They were one of the Murray River tribes, situated between Boggy Flat and Penn Reach, running to the vicinity of Loxton. They were also on the western side of the Lake Bonney. Their purchase on the Murray was between Nildottie and Devon Downs, at a place known as Wutjuwati.

Defined by the Ngawait language, the group's traditional lands are in the upper reaches of the Murray within South Australia. There are a number of dialect groups, such as the Barmerara Meru group at Barmera.

Their traditional lands were bordered on the west by the Ngaiawang and on the east by Erawirung peoples.

== Social organisation ==
The Ngawait were composed of sub-groups or clans, of which at least two are known:

- Barmerara Meru (at Barmera)
- Muljulpero maru

== Language ==
They spoke the Ngawait language.

== Initiation ceremony ==
Edward Eyre was on hand to describe the rites of passages among the Ngawait which ushered in youths to full manhood. His account is summarized by R. H. Mathews in the following passage:

When one of these tribes neared the appointed place of meeting the men of the tribe who had sent out the invitation sat down in a row to receive them. The novices, painted with red ochre and grease, sat behind the men, and the women sat behind the novices. The new mob now approached-the men painted and carrying their weapons, the women and children being the rear, separate from the men, and a little on one strangers halted, and some of their women singled out of the rest and stood between the two tribes. These women then threw down their cloaks and bags and raised a loud wail, accompanied by frantic gesticulations, lacerating their bodies with sharp shells till the blood flowed from the wounds. After some time had been spent in this way the women took up their bundles again and returned to the rear of their own party.An elderly man of the Narwijjerook people now advanced and held a short colloquy with the local mob. He then stepped back and brought his own men forward, exhibiting in front three uplifted spears, to which were attached the little nets left with them by the envoys already referred to, and which were the emblems of the duty they had to perform. The men of the Moorundie tribe now rose to their feet with a suppressed shout. The new arrivals then speared fifteen or sixteen of the local men in the left arm a little below the shoulder, the latter holding out their arms for the purpose of receiving the wounds. The Narwijjerooks then withdrew about a hundred yards and camped.

When all the tribes had arrived the date was fixed for carrying out the ceremonies. Early in the morning of the appointed day the novices were mustered out of the camp and ran away a short distance, where they were captured and thrown down. They were next raised up and surrounded by several natives, who held them while they were painted from head to foot with red ochre and grease. The mothers and other relatives then surrounded the group of men, crying and lamenting and lacerating their bodies with sharp shells or flints. When the painting of the novices was completed they were led away by their guardians to a little distance and placed, sitting down, on green bushes brought for the purpose. If they were permitted to move from where they were sitting, they had to hold a bunch of green boughs in each hand. Close to this place the three spears, with the nets attached, already mentioned, were stuck in a row in the ground. Three men then went and seated themselves at the foot of the three spears, with their legs crossed. Two men proceeded to where the novices were and, seizing each in succession by the legs and shoulders, carefully lifted them from the ground and carried them and laid them on their backs at full length on green boughs spread upon the ground in front of the three men sitting by the spears, so that the head of each novice rested on the lap of one of the three men. The novices kept their eyes closed all this while and pretended to be in a trance.

A cloak was then thrown over each novice and a man, selected from a distant tribe, came quietly up and sat down beside him, and, lifting up the cloak, commenced plucking the hair from the pubes. At intervals the operators were relieved by others of both sexes. When all the hair had been pulled out, that of each novice was carefully rolled up in green boughs, all the lots being put together and given to one of the old men to take care of. Bunches of green boughs were now placed under the arms and in the hands of each novice, after which several natives took hold of them, raising them suddenly and simultaneously to their feet, while a loud, guttural " whaugh ! " was uttered by the other natives standing around. The heads and bodies of the novices were then rubbed over with grease and red ochre, and tufts of feathers and kangaroo teeth were worn tied to the hair in front.

== Alternative names ==
- Barmerara Meru
- Eritark (Nganguruku exonym)
- Meru ("man", generic name for several tribes)
- Muljulpero maru
- Narwijjerook
- Nauait
- Ngawaitjung
- Ngawaitjung (language name)
- Ngawijung, Narwejung, Narwijijong
- Njawatjurk (Maraura exonym)
- Nyauaitj
- Wem:ara (Ngaiawang exonym)

== Sources ==
- Angas, George French (1847). Savage life and scenes in Australia and New Zealand (PDF). Vol. 1. Smith, Elder and Co.
- "Boggy Flat Landing Map". Mapcarta.
- Brown, A. R. (July–December 1918). "Notes on the Social Organization of Australian Tribes". The Journal of the Royal Anthropological Institute of Great Britain and Ireland. 48: 222–253. doi:10.2307/2843422. JSTOR 2843422.
- Eyre, Edward John (1845a). Journals of expeditions of discovery into central Australia, and overland from Adelaide to King George's Sound, in the years 1840-1 (PDF). Vol. 1. London: T. and W. Boone.
- Eyre, Edward John (1845b). Journals of expeditions of discovery into central Australia, and overland from Adelaide to King George's Sound, in the years 1840-1 (PDF). Vol. 2. London: T. and W. Boone.
- Mathews, R. H (November 1898). "The Victorian Aborigines: Their Initiation Ceremonies and Divisional Systems". American Anthropologist. 11 (11): 325–343. JSTOR 658697.
- "Ngawadj". Mobile Language Team.
- Taplin, George (1879). Folklore, manners, customs and languages of the South Australian aborigines (PDF). Adelaide: E Spiller, Acting Government Printer.
- Tindale, Norman Barnett (1974). "Ngawait (SA)". Aboriginal Tribes of Australia: Their Terrain, Environmental Controls, Distribution, Limits, and Proper Names. Australian National University Press. ISBN 978-0-708-10741-6.
