= YXU =

YXU may refer to:

- London International Airport, Ontario, Canada, IATA airport code YXU
- Yuyu language, of South Australia, ISO 639-3 code yxu
