= NWG =

NWG or nwg may refer to:

- Northumbrian Water Group, a British water company
- NWG, the LSE and NYSE stock symbol for NatWest Group, England
- NWG, the station code for Nunawading railway station, Victoria, Australia
- nwg, the ISO 639-3 code for Ngayawung language, South Australia
