= Jitajita =

Indigenous Australian People

The Jitajita, otherwise spelt Yitayita, are an indigenous Australian people of southern New South Wales.

== Language ==
The Yitayita spoke one of the languages of the lower Murray river group that included Dadi Dadi and Kureinji, and is distinctive for the large number of monosyllables in its vocabulary.

== Name ==
The tribal name Jitajita is a reduplicative endonym formed from their word for 'no' (jita). Numerous tribes in the area defined themselves in terms of the negative used. Early ethnographers marveled at the variety of words for 'no' among the Riverine tribes, as an index of the differences in their languages. Peter Beveridge remarked:

Each tribes possesses a gnalla wattow or postman, who can speak and understand the dialects of all the tribes within a radius of 150 miles. The persons of these officials are held sacred, even by tribes which are at feud with their own: they therefore negotiate all matters of barter and trade policy. (Note: Beveridge was astounded by this linguistic agility and further asserted:'Singular to say, these Ngalla Wattows are, without exception, more or less imbecile or silly, still they perform their respective functions most admirably. In physical development these men are all small, very wiry and attenuated,-their constant travelling and short commons on their many tribal missions not being conducive to the making of flesh (Beveridge 1883, p. 19))

== Country ==
The Jitajita lands covered some 4,800 square miles (12,000 km^{2}), north of the Lachlan River from near Booligal - to vicinity of Balranald, west to Carrawathal. They appear to have been closely related to the Muthi Muthi. Their northwestern boundaries reached the edge of the Parintji domain.

== Alternative names ==
- Eethie-Eethie, Eethee Eethee, Eetha-eetha
- Ita-ita, Ithi-ithi, Iti-iti
- Tjuop
- Yetho, Yit-tha, Yitsa

Source: Tindale 1974

== Some words ==
- tin (foot)
- kapul (leg)

== Sources ==
- Beveridge, Peter (1883). "Of the aborigines inhabiting the great lacustrine and Riverine depression of the Lower Murray". Journal and Proceedings of the Royal Society of New South Wales. 17. Melbourne: 19–74. doi:10.5962/p.358946.
- Hercus, Luise (1989). "Three Linguistic Studies from Far South-Western NSW" (PDF). Aboriginal History. 13 (1): 45–62.
- Tindale, Norman Barnett (1974). "Jitajita (NSW)". Aboriginal Tribes of Australia: Their Terrain, Environmental Controls, Distribution, Limits, and Proper Names. Australian National University Press. ISBN 978-0-708-10741-6. Archived from the original on 19 July 2018.
