= Jari Jari language =

Jari Jari language, sometimes spelled Yati Yati, Yerreyerre or other variants, may refer to:

- Wadi Wadi, an extinct Australian language once spoken in New South Wales
- Keramin language, an extinct Australian language once spoken in New South Wales
