= Kureinji =

Kureinji Traditional lands
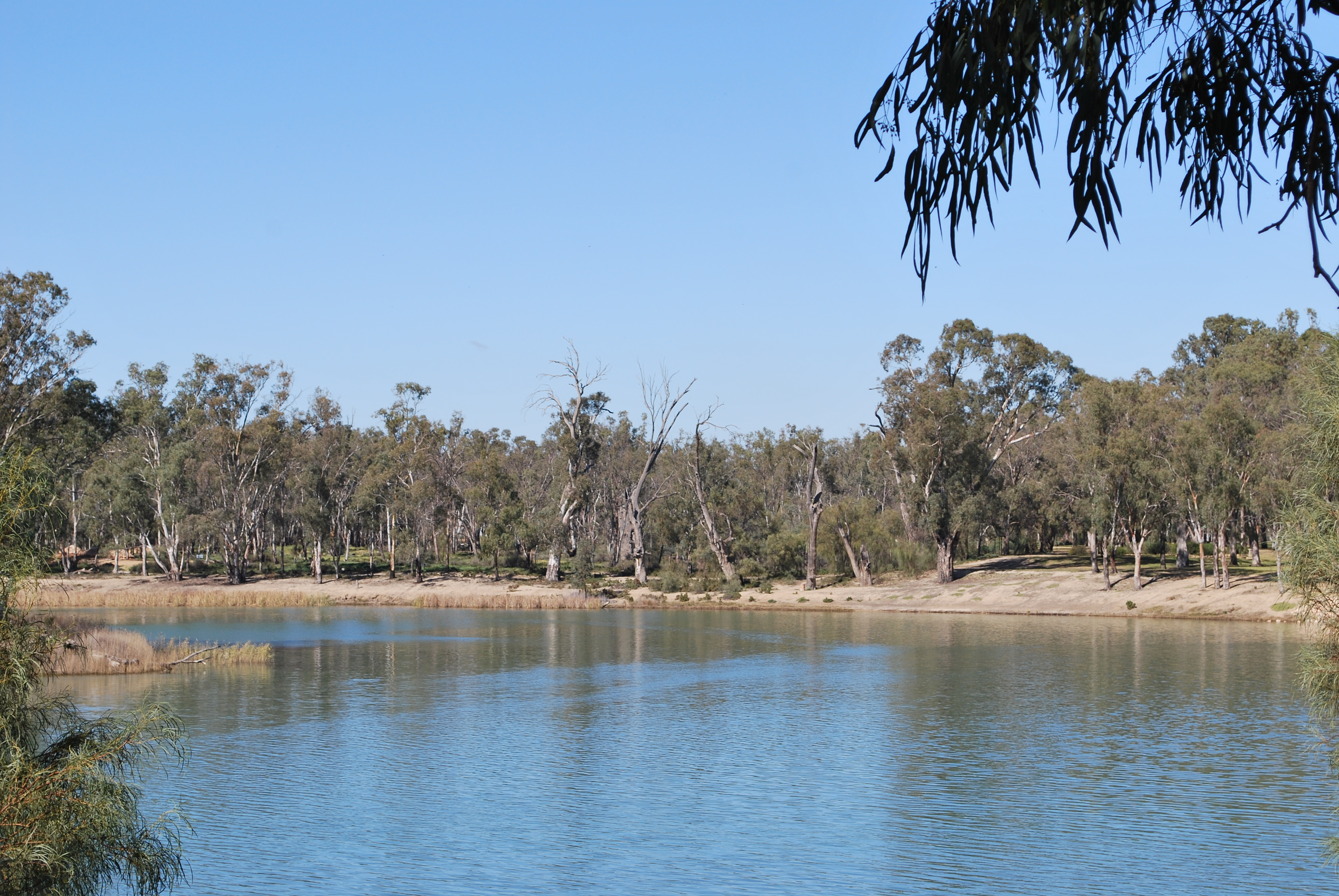
- Murray River on Kureinji lands

- Coordinates: 34°11′0″S 142°11′0″E
- Country: Australia
- State: New South Wales

The Kureinji, otherwise known as the Keramin, are an Aboriginal group whose traditional lands are located in south-west New South Wales, Australia, along the north side of the Murray River, roughly between today's settlements of Euston and Wentworth.

== Language ==
Kureinji was one of 35 languages spoken in this area of south-western New South Wales, around and north of the border with Victoria. Linguistically, the people were part of the Lower Murray Areal group, and with Yitayita and Dadi Dadi forms a distinct subfamily.

== Country ==
According to ethnologist Norman Tindale, the traditional lands of the Kureinji embraced some 1,700 square miles (4,400 km^{2}) of territory, running in good part along the northern banks of the Murray River, ranging from the vicinity of Euston to Wentworth downstream.

Across the river from the Kureinji, Mildura, which is in Latjilatji tribal land, was first settled by Europeans in 1847.

Kemendok National Park is part of their traditional land, and traces of their habitation remains in scar trees, fire hearths, flaked stone artefacts, burial sites and middens.

== History ==
Charles Sturt passed through their country in 1830 but did not mention the Kureinji. Charles Lockhart in 1862 also appears to mention them, but without specifying them by name. Today, many Kureinji live in Mildura.

During colonial times, the remains of many Aboriginal people were looted from five burial sites along the New South Wales side of the Murray River, and became part of the Murray Black Collection. Aboriginal groups have sought the repatriation of the bodies. (Note: "The Murray Black Collection was the largest collection of Indigenous Australian remains at the time of its donation, comprising approximately 800 individuals from the Maraura, Kureinji, Tati-tati, and Wati Wati peoples across five burial sites along the New South Wales side of the Murray River." (Prince 2015, pp. 11–13, 11))

== Alternative names ==
- Garnghes
- Grangema
- Jungeegatchere
- Kareingi
- Karin
- Kemendok
- Keramin
- Kerinma, Karinma, Karingma
- Kianigane
- Kinenekinene
- Orangema (misprint)
- Pintwa

Source: Tindale 1974

== Sources ==
- Dixon, Robert M. W. (2002). Australian Languages: Their Nature and Development. Vol. 1. Cambridge University Press. ISBN 978-0-521-47378-1.
- Hercus, Luise (1989). "Three Linguistic Studies from Far South-Western NSW" (PDF). Aboriginal History. 13 (1): 45–62.
- Prince, Jordi Rivera Rivera (2015). Can the Repatriation of the Murray Black Collection be Considered an Apology? Colonial Institutional Culpability in the Indigenous Australian Fight for Decolonization. In Situ. pp. 9–13. Archived from the original on 26 November 2016.
- Statement of Management Intent Kemendok National (PDF). Office of Environment & Heritage, NSW. June 2014. pp. 1–6. ISBN 978-1-743-59685-2.
- Tindale, Norman Barnett (1974). "Kureinji (NSW)". Aboriginal Tribes of Australia: Their Terrain, Environmental Controls, Distribution, Limits, and Proper Names. Australian National University Press. ISBN 978-0-708-10741-6. Archived from the original on 22 September 2016.
- von Zinnenburg Carroll, Khadija (2014). Art in the Time of Colony: Empires and the Making of the Modern World, 1650–2000. Ashgate Publishing. ISBN 978-1-409-45596-7.
