= Ngaiawang language =

Extinct Australian Aboriginal language

Ngayawung
- Lower Riverland
- Region: South Australia
- Ethnicity: Ngaiawang, Ngaralti, Nganguruku
- Extinct: (date missing)
- Revival
- Language family: Pama–Nyungan: Lower Murray; Ngayawung
- Dialects: Ngayawang; Nganguruku; Ngaralti (Ngaralda)?

Language codes
- ISO 639-3: nwg
- Glottolog: lowe1402
- AIATSIS: S7 Ngaiawang, S4 Ngaralti, S6 Nganguruku

Ngayawung (Ngaiawong NIGH-uh-wong) is an extinct language of southern South Australia, spoken by the Ngaiawang, Ngaralti and Nganguruku people.

The name is also spelled Ngaiyau, Aiawung, Aiawong, Iawung, Nggauaiyowangko; other names are Birta, Pitta, Pieta, Peeita and Meru.

== Phonology ==
=== Consonants ===
	Peripheral		Laminal		Apical	
	Labial	Velar	Dental	Palatal	Alveolar	Retroflex
Plosive	p	k	t̪	c	t	ʈ
Nasal	m	ŋ		ɲ	n	ɳ
Rhotic					ɾ~r	ɻ
Lateral				ʎ	l	ɭ
Approximant	w			j		

=== Vowels ===
	Front	Central	Back
High	i iː		u uː
Low		a aː	
