= Lake Bonney Riverland =

Freshwater lake in South Australia

- Barmera
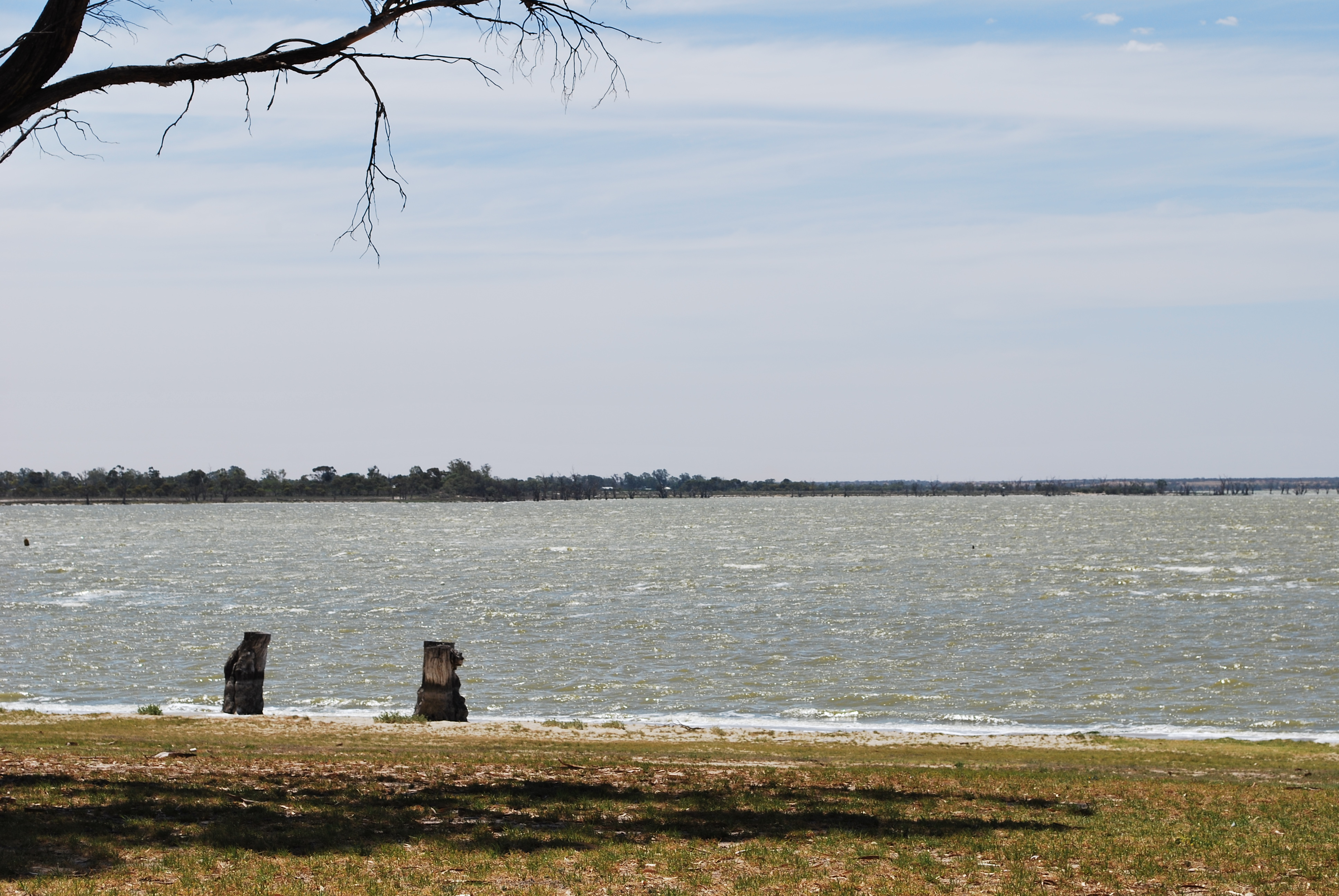
- Lake Bonney Riverland seen from Barmera

- Location in South Australia
- Location: Riverland, South Australia
- Coordinates: 34°14′S 140°27′E
- Primary inflows: Murray River
- Primary outflows: Murray River
- Catchment area: Murray Darling Basin
- Basin countries: Australia
- Surface area: 16.2 square kilometres (6.25 mi^{2})
- Settlements: Barmera

Lake Bonney Riverland (alternative name: Barmera) is a freshwater lake in the Riverland region of South Australia. The lake is fed and drained by the River Murray. The town of Barmera is located on its shores.

== History ==
The original inhabitants were the Barmerara Meru clan of the Ngawadj people.

The lake was first seen by Europeans on 12 March 1838, when encountered by the overlanding party of Joseph Hawdon and Charles Bonney, who were the first to drove livestock from New South Wales to Adelaide. Hawdon named the lake that day after Bonney, while recording that the local Aboriginal people named it "Nookampka". At that time it was a fine sheet of water, but was dried out and muddy three years later in 1841 when the police expedition led by Thomas O'Halloran passed by on its way to rescue other overlanders at the Rufus River.

When Charles Sturt passed by in 1844 on his expedition into the interior of Australia, he surveyed Lake Bonney for the first time, as well as the creek connecting it to the River Murray. James Collins Hawker, then residing at Moorundie, assisted Sturt's surveyor Poole. In appreciation, on 2 September 1844 Sturt named the creek Hawkers Creek, but it was never officially adopted and is known as Chambers Creek.

Pioneering settlers sometimes cropped the dry lake bed in times of low river flows. In 2007, to conserve water in the Murray system, a regulator was installed. The regulator cut the lake from the river system and the lakes' level dropped to its lowest level since 1914 and salinity increased markedly with loss of wildlife and also recreational water activities. The regulator was removed in December 2010 and this, with wet summer and winter rains restored it to normal levels by April 2011.

== Naming ==
The lake was named Lake Bonney by Joseph Hawdon after his friend, Charles Bonney in 1838. The name was changed to "Lake Barmera, River Murray" in 1908 and was changed back to "Lake Bonney" in 1913 "for historic reasons". A subsequent proposal to rename the lake as "Lake Barmera" did not proceed.

A lake located in the south east of the state near the continental coastline in what is now the gazetted locality of Canunda was also named as "Lake Bonney" after the same Charles Bonney in 1844 by George Grey, the then Governor of South Australia.

In both 1972 and 1981, the District Council of Barmera wrote to the South Australian government requesting that the lake in the south east of the state be renamed with its native name, i.e. "Canunda" or "Coonunda", in order to avoid being confused with the lake in the Riverland. In response to the request sent in 1981, the Geographical Names Board renamed both lakes as "Lake Bonney, Riverland" and "Lake Bonney SE" in order “to differentiate between the lakes.”

In 2014, the South Australian government declared the lake to have the dual names of "Lake Bonney Riverland" / "Barmera" in response to a request from a group known as the "First Peoples of the River Murray and Mallee Region".

== Recreation ==
Since the 1950s the lake has been a popular venue for holidaymakers, being used for a wide range of water sports, particularly sailing and water-skiing.

== Monuments ==
In 2022, two side-by-side pillar-shaped monuments were erected on the shores of the lake, in homage to Aboriginal singer-songwriters Ruby Hunter and Archie Roach. Glass mosaic artwork on the front side of each monument, designed by Hunter's sister-in-law, Rosslyn Richards, depict Hunter's Ngarrindjeri totem, the pelican (nori) and Roach's totem, the eagle, respectively.

== See also ==
- List of lakes of Australia § South Australia
