= District Council of Barmera =

Coordinates: 34°15′07″S 140°27′56″E

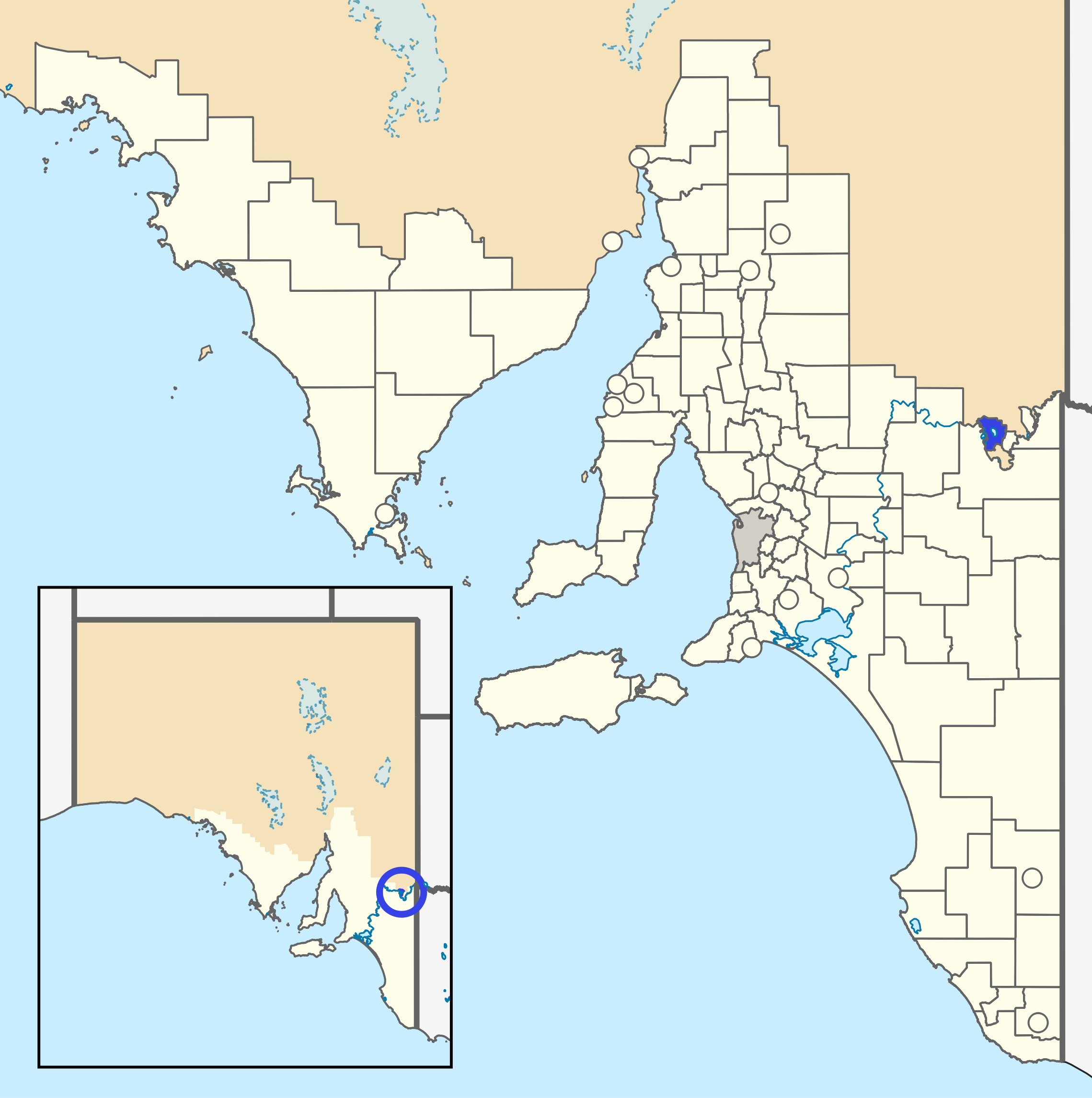
The District Council of Barmera as it was prior to disestablishment (blue)

The District Council of Barmera (formerly the District Council of Cobdogla) was a local government area in the Australian state of South Australia from 1924 to 1996.

It came in existence as a result of a soldier settlement being developed on land adjoining Lake Bonney from 1919 onwards. Known as the Cobdogla Irrigation Area, the district was governed directly by the state Department of Lands until December 1923 when local residents proposed that a district council be formed.

The district council was gazetted on 17 January 1924 with its seat being located in the township of Barmera. The district council consisted of two wards – Barmera and Cobdogla which were represented by three and two councillors respectively.

In 1936, it was reported that produce grown within the district included currants, dried fruits, Lexia raisins and sultanas intended for direct consumption and muscatels grown specifically for wine production within the district and in other places including the "Barossa district."

During the 1920s, a proposal to rename the district council as the ‘District Council of Barmera’ was discussed by the District council with the councillors representing the Cobdogla ward advising opposition to it. A referendum held in 1928 resulted in residents voting in favour of the proposal and the District Council petitioned the George Jenkins, the Minister of Local Government, to ask that the name change be gazetted. However, a cross-petition from residents opposing the name change was received and the Minister declined to allow the name change. The change of name was finally gazetted in 1937.

In 1986, the council was described as covering an area of 296 square kilometres (114 sq mi) including 40 square kilometres (15 sq mi) subject to permanent water inundation, and having a population of about 4400 people. Primary industry consisted of viticulture where grapes were produced for wine production within both the Riverland and the Barossa Valley, and horticulture consisting of stone fruit production intended for canning and drying, and market gardens producing vegetables for sale in Adelaide.

It was amalgamated with the District Council of Berri on 1 October 1996 to form the Berri Barmera Council.

== Chairmen ==
The following persons were elected to serve as chairman of the council for the following terms:

- Charles Jesse Panter Bruce (1924)
- Alan Harcourt Kelly (1928–39)
- Cecil Claude Marcelin Chabrel (1938–39)
- Donald Hamilton Brooke (1939) and (1943–45)
- Bernard Revell Cant (1939–40)
- Ibenezer Farmer (1940–42) and (1946–48)
- Eric Davies Sims (1942–43)
- John Stewart MacDonald (1943–53)
- Edward Norman Hill (1945–46)
- Henry Gunter Anderson (1948–55)
- Jack Victor Foot (1955–59)
- John McNaught Aird (1959–60)
- Sydney Edward Fletcher (1960–68)
- Donald Davis Thomas (1968–71)
- Denys Murray Trevelyan (1971–75)
- Bruce John Scott Vasey (1975–87)

== Citations and references ==
Citations

References

- The District Council of Barmera, Berri Barmera Council, 2016
- Matthews, Penny (1986), South Australia, the civic record, 1836-1986, Wakefield Press, ISBN 978-0-949268-82-2
- Hosking, P. (1936), The Official civic record of South Australia : centenary year, 1936, Universal Publicity Company
