= Ngaiawang =

Aboriginal Australian people

The Ngaiawang (Ngayawang) were an Aboriginal Australian people of the western Riverland area of South Australia, with a language considered part of the Lower Murray group. They are now considered extinct. They have sometimes been referred to as part of the Meru people, a larger grouping which could also include the Ngawait and Erawirung peoples. They were called Birta by the Kaurna and Ngadjuri peoples, variations of Murundi by the Jarildekald people, and were also known various other terms and spellings.

== Language ==
The Ngayawung language belonged to the Lower Murray language branch of the Pama–Nyungan family.

== Country ==
The Ngaiawang lived in an area of some 6,200 square kilometres (2,400 sq mi) ranging along the Murray River from Herman Landing (Nildottie) to Penn Reach (near Qualco). The western boundary was formed by the scarp of the Mount Lofty Ranges. To the south, the tribal territory ended at Ngautngaut (Devon Downs) rock shelter, the first area to be subject to archaeological excavation (by Norman Tindale and Herbert Hale of the South Australian Museum) and the first formal archaeological excavation undertaken in Australia.

== Society ==
The Ngaiawang consisted of some ten clans or peoples, among which were the Molo people. They did not practice circumcision, and were derided for this by the Kaurna, whose derogative exonym for them, Paruru, meant "uncircumcised" or "animal".

== History ==
The first recorded encounter of the Ngaiawang with Europeans occurred when the explorer Edward John Eyre came across them at Lake Bonney. When Eyre returned to England in 1845, onboard the Symmetry, he took two Ngaiawang boys with him, one of who was Warrulan.

== Alternative names ==
- Aiawung, Aiawong (given by Eyre, who, according to Tindale, was tone deaf to the initial ng sound)
- Birta (Kaurna and Ngadjuri term)
- Iawung
- Karn-brikolenbola (horde at Moorunde)
- Meru (term for man)
- Moorunde, Moorundee, Moorundie
- Murundi (Jarildekald term for the Murray River upriver from Lake Alexandrina and place name south of Blanchetown)
- Naiawu (a language name); Niawoo
- Ngaiawung
- Ngaijawa, Ngaiyawa
- Ngaiyau
- Nggauaiyo-wangko
- Paruru (Kaurna term meaning "uncircumcised" (also "animal") to denote the Ngaiawang and other Murray River tribes
- Pijita, Pitta, Pieta, Peeita
- Wakanuwan (name applied by the Jarildekald to this, the Nganguruku, and other tribes; they called the language Walkalde)

Source: Tindale 1974

== Sources ==
- Mulvaney, DJ (27 May 2015). "Archaeology". SA History Hub. History Trust of South Australia.
- "Ngaut Ngaut (Devon Downs) Excavation Assemblage". Research Data Australia.
- Tindale, Norman Barnett (1974). "Ngaiawang (SA)". Aboriginal Tribes of Australia: Their Terrain, Environmental Controls, Distribution, Limits, and Proper Names. Australian National University Press. ISBN 978-0-708-10741-6. Archived from the original on 17 April 2021.
