= Yitha Yitha language =

Australian Aboriginal language

Yitha-Yitha
- Lower Darling–Lower Lachlan
- Region: New South Wales
- Ethnicity: Yitha Yitha, Dadi Dadi
- Native speakers: 10 (2005, Dadi Dadi)
- Language family: Pama–Nyungan: Lower Murray; Yitha-Yitha
- Dialects: Yitha-Yitha; Dardi-Dardi (Tati-Tati, Ta-tati)

Language codes
- ISO 639-3: Either: xth – Yitha Yitha dda – Dadi Dadi
- Glottolog: lowe1403
- AIATSIS: D7 Yitha Yitha, S28 Dadi Dadi
- ELP: Yitha-Yitha
- Dadi Dadi
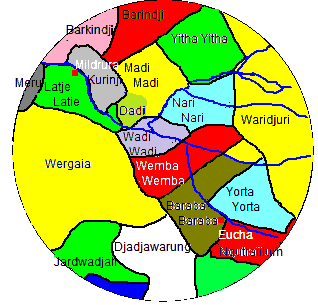
- Jitajita traditional lands

Yitha-Yitha is a moribund language of southern New South Wales spoken by the Yitha Yitha people. The language was studied in the 1980s. Yita Yita has many monosyllabic words, consonant finals and consonant clusters. Many Yita Yita place names include the words tin meaning foot, and cabul meaning leg.
