= Ngaralda =

Aboriginal Australian people

The Ngaralda (Ngaralta), also known as Meru or Brabirawilung (though this last may be confusion with Brabralung), were an indigenous Australian people of South Australia.

== Country ==
In Norman Tindale's estimation the Ngaralta possessed some 300 square miles (780 km^{2}) of tribal lands, from Wood Hill on the Murray River to Port Mannum. Their western confines were at Bremer Creek, Palmer, and as far as the eastern scarp of the Mount Lofty Ranges. Their boundary with the Jarildekald was at Pitjaringgarang (Mason Rock) on the eastern bank of the Murray.

== Alternative names ==
- Ngaraltu
- Wanaulun
- Wanjakalde (Jarildekald exonyms)
- Wanyakalde
- Wunyakalde
- Wanakald

== Sources ==
- Brown, A. R. (July–December 1918). "Notes on the Social Organization of Australian Tribes". The Journal of the Royal Anthropological Institute of Great Britain and Ireland. 48: 222–253. doi:10.2307/2843422. JSTOR 2843422.
- Edwards, Robert; Stewart, Jenny, eds. (1980). Preserving Indigenous Cultures: A New Role for Museums. Australian Government Publishing Service. ISBN 9780642049803.
- Tindale, Norman Barnett (1974). "Ngaralta (SA)". Aboriginal Tribes of Australia: Their Terrain, Environmental Controls, Distribution, Limits, and Proper Names. Australian National University Press. ISBN 978-0-708-10741-6.
