= Nanya =

Australian Aboriginal man

Nanya (c.1835 – 1895) was an Aboriginal Australian man who founded a family that would be one of the last to live by traditional indigenous means in New South Wales.

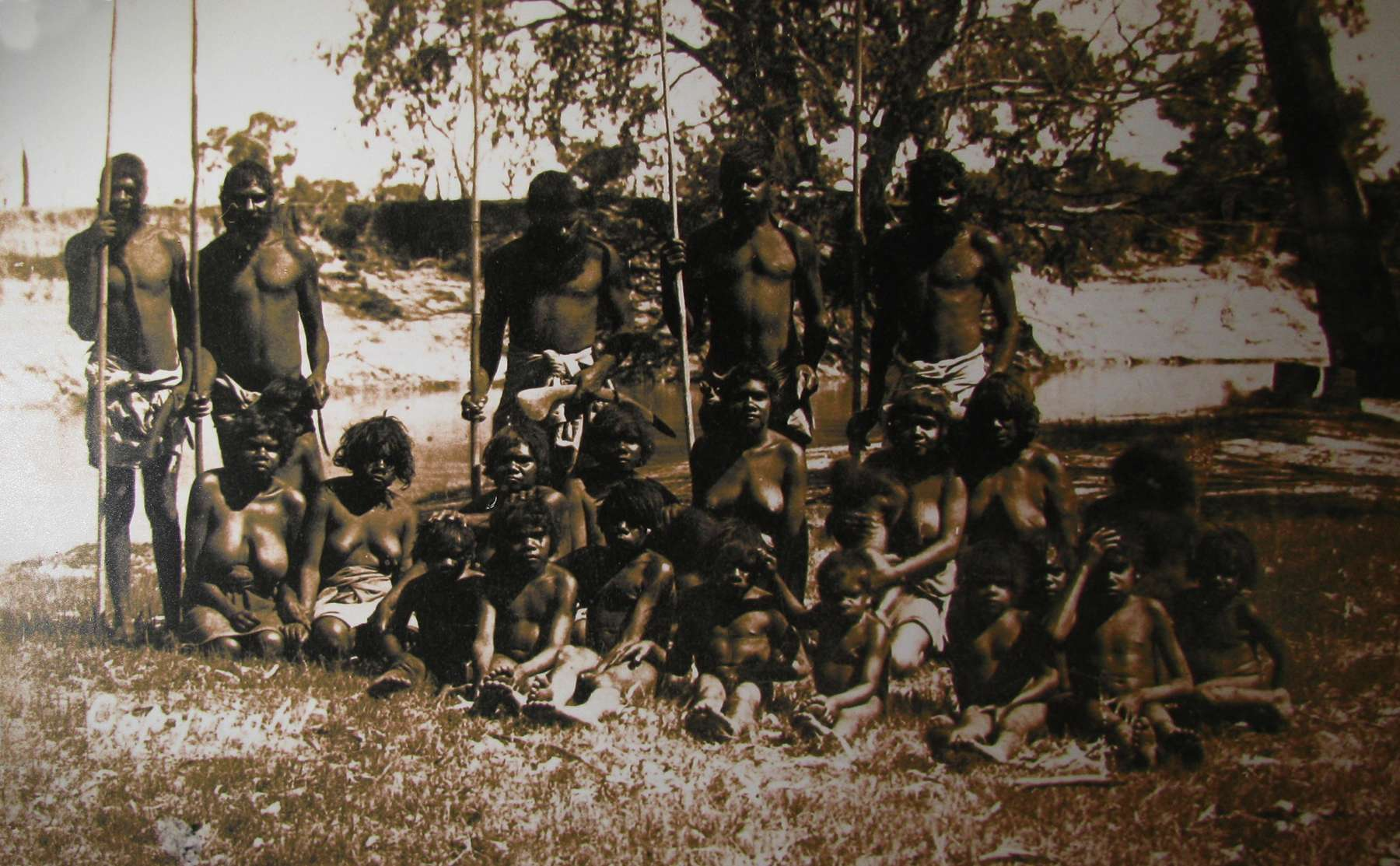
The Nanya family, shortly after their capture in 1894

Nanya was born around 1835 and was of the Maraura tribe of the lower Darling area in the south-western corner New South Wales. Raised in traditional indigenous surroundings, during his childhood and early adulthood his peoples' native lands were increasingly encroached upon by white settlers, until eventually their lands were swallowed entirely by the Cuthero Station in the 1850s. The Maraura and neighbouring tribes were slowly forced onto stations or camps, and Nanya and his family were relocated to the Popiltah station, 80 km north-west of Pooncarie.

Nanya acquired a reputation for his strong-will and non-conformist attitude, acquiring the nickname "Dthareena", indicating a fiery and amorous persona. Oral tradition holds that his nature and personality eventually brought him into conflict with his own tribe, as Nanya began relations with a woman of his own moiety grouping: a serious taboo in Australian indigenous culture meriting the death penalty in tribes of the region. Facing social ostracism or worse, Nanya and his lover, joined by another women, decided to leave Popiltah. With some limited supplies (as legend holds, the only tool taken was a single steel axe) they travelled west into the vast unsettled and largely waterless land between the South Australian border and the western Anabranch of the Darling river.

Nanya and his followers would live in this remote area, known as the 'Scotia blocks' for the next the three decades, and the family grew to include many children and grandchildren, eventually coming to be known by others as the Nanya 'tribe' or 'clan'. The family made little contact during this time with others, though their continued existence was evidenced by tracks and cut plants. Aboriginal stockmen reported occasional sightings and were said to be aware of their movements. The Nanya family lived by traditional methods off the land - kangaroos and lizards were hunted with spears and eggs from termites were collected. Water was extremely scarce, however it could be obtained from the roots of various plants such as the red mallee and needlebrush.

Settlers and land-holders in the region remained indifferent or largely unaware of the family for several decades. However the steady enlargement of the family, and the continuing spread of livestock stations in the region, led to increased sightings of the 'wild tribe' throughout the 1890s. By the 1870s, practically all fertile land in Australia had been colonized by whites. The frontier wars had long ended in New South Wales, and of the indigenous people of the state who had not died, virtually all had been relocated into missions or reserves. Local whites and authorities thus increasingly became concerned at the continued existence of this large family, now numbering thirty, outside of the now accepted system for Aboriginal people. Ultimately a party led by local station owners set out in 1893 to capture the Nanya family and have them returned to the settled areas. There were rumours of a reward offered by the Aboriginal Protection Board for the clans capture which may have inspired the change of policy of indifference to confrontation amongst the local landowners, but it was ultimately proved no such reward existed. In any case, the family were tracked down later that year and were coerced by the party to return to the Popiltah station.

The Nanya family attracted the attention of the colonial press, as to the great surprise of whites the family was well nourished and in excellent physical condition when captured. They refused modern foods such as bread and sugar initially, and a site for the family to live designated by the protection board near Wentworth was ignored and the clan choose to live on the outskirts of Pooncarie. However Nanya's children were utterly unaccustomed Western civilization having lived their whole lives in remote isolation - within a matter of years most of Nanya's children had either died of diseases they had no immunity for or had become sickly (and often obese) after the dramatic change to calorific European-style diets. Others, such as son Billy, could not psychologically adjust to the new lifestyle and committed suicide. Nanya himself died in 1895 and was buried out near the Great Darling Anabranch where he had spent most of his life.

== See also ==
- List of Indigenous Australian historical figures
