= Manunka =

Aboriginal community in South Australia

Manunka is an Aboriginal community and former mission in South Australia.

== History ==
The Manunka Mission was established by the missionary Mrs Janet Matthews in 1901 on 40 acres of land along the banks of the Murray River near Mannum. The Mission also operated as a ration station distributing Government supplied food, medicines and materials to some local Aboriginal people. The government provided funds to the Mission of approximately £200 per year, and it received some subscriptions from the public. The Mission’s residents also helped to support the Mission with basket making, ‘rush-work’ and by working on farms in the local area. A day school operated at the Mission and a dormitory was planned. By 1909 it was reported that 40 or 50 Aboriginal people were living at the Mission. Mrs Matthews ran a day school for Aboriginal children and a dormitory was planned. The Mission closed in 1916. Many families who resided at the Manunka Mission later moved to the Swan Reach Mission and then onto Gerard Mission. The ration depot at Manunka continued to operate into the 1930s.

The land is now held by the Manunka Aboriginal Corporation.
