= Peter Beveridge =

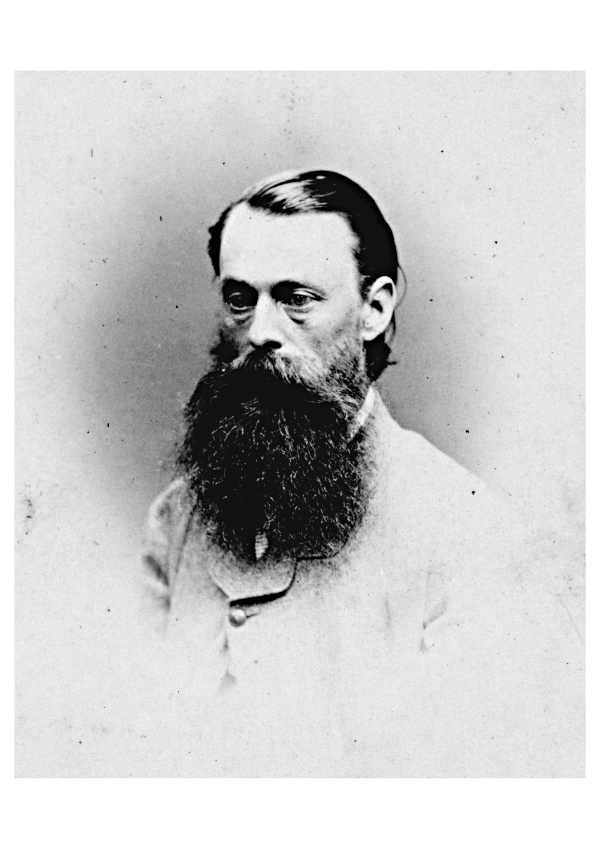
Peter Beveridge

Peter Beveridge (24 June 1829 – 4 October 1885) was a grazier and writer in colonial Australia.

== Life ==
Beveridge was born at Dunfermline, Fife, Scotland, and went to Victoria ten years later with his father, who engaged in pastoral pursuits near the township of Beveridge, to which the family gave their name. In 1845 Mr. Peter Beveridge took up country on the lower Murray River, settling at Tyntyndyer, some ten miles below what is now Swan Hill. Here for twenty-three years he made a careful study of the habits and customs of the then numerous aborigines of the Lower Murray and Riverine districts. The result of his observations was embodied in a work entitled "The Aborigines of Victoria and Riverine," published posthumously in 1889. Beveridge, who latterly resided at French Island, died at Woodburn, near Kilmore, Victoria, Australia.

== Works ==
- The Aborigines of Victoria and Riverina: as seen by Peter Beveridge, Melbourne: M.L. Hutchinson, 1889, Wikidata Q19077386
