= Ngangaruku =

Aboriginal Australian people

The Nganguruku are an indigenous Australian people of the state of South Australia.

== Language ==
The Nganguruku traditionally spoke a language similar to that of the Ngaiawang, but with significant dialect differences. The similarity has caused them to occasionally be confused or conflated with the latter tribe.

== Country ==
The traditional tribal lands of the Nganguruku have covered some 600 square miles (1,600 km^{2}) around the Murray River from the west bank town of Mannum to south Rhine River junction. Their western confines have run to the scarp of the Mount Lofty Ranges.

== History of contact ==
The Nganguruku have been, in comparative terms, a relatively small First Nation. In many cases losing their lands to pastoralists, descendants of the Nganguruku had taken up residence at the Manunka Mission, and, later, moved to live around the area of Morgan, which still has people of mixed Nganguruku origins.

== Alternative names ==
- Meru (a designation of a larger tribal confederation of which they were believed to form a part.)
