= Yuyu language =

Extinct Australian Aboriginal language

Yuyu
- Yirau, Upper Riverland
- Region: South Australia
- Ethnicity: Ngawait, Erawirung, Ngintait, Ngarkat
- Extinct: (date missing)
- Language family: Pama–Nyungan: Lower Murray; Yuyu
- Dialects: Ngintait (Inteck); Ngarkat (Ngarrket); Yirawirung (Erawirung); Ngawait

Language codes
- ISO 639-3: yxu
- Glottolog: uppe1415
- AIATSIS: S19 Yuyu, S18 Ngintait

Yuyu (Yirau) is an extinct language or dialect cluster of southern South Australia. Walsh treats Yuyu as a language with Ngawait, Erawirung, Ngintait, and Ngarkat as dialects; Berndt and Berndt (1993) list those as dialects related to Yuyu.
