= Rufus River massacre =

1841 massacre in the Central Murray region, Australia

- Part of the Australian frontier wars
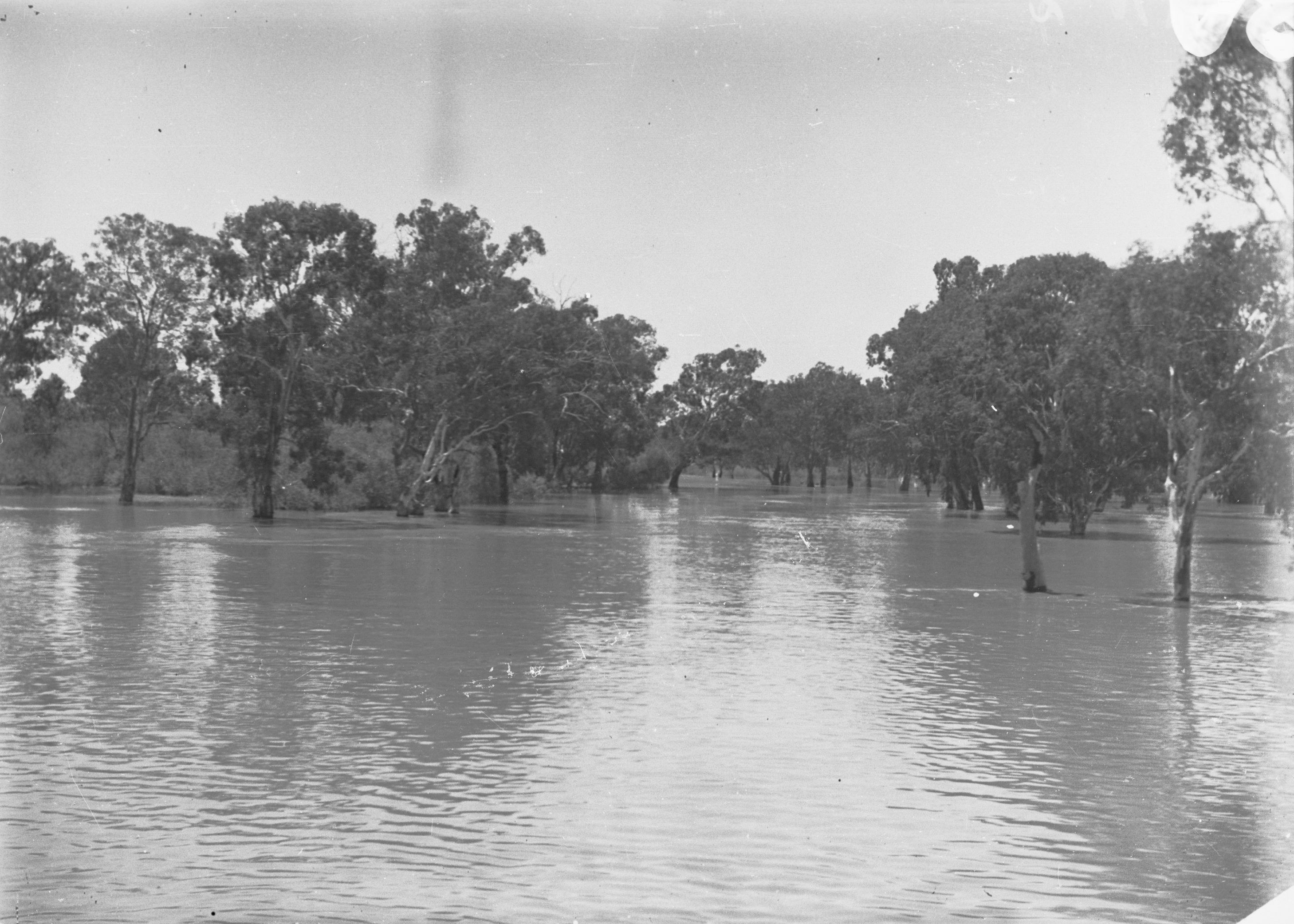
- A photograph of the Rufus River
- Location: 34°03′S 141°15′E; Rufus River, New South Wales
- Date: 1841 August 27; 185 years ago
- Attack type: Massacre
- Deaths: 30+ killed
- Victim: Indigenous Australians
- Perpetrators: South Australian Police led by Sub-Inspector Bernard Shaw and British colonists led by William Robinson.

The Rufus River Massacre was a massacre of at least 30–40 Aboriginal people that took place in 1841 along the Rufus River, in the Central Murray River region of New South Wales (now Australia). The massacre was conducted by a large group of South Australian Police, who were sent to the region by the Governor of South Australia, George Grey, after Indigenous warriors carried out a series of effective raids against settler overland drives. The police were augmented by armed volunteers and a separate party of overlanders who were already battling with Aboriginal people in the Rufus River area. The colony's Protector of Aborigines, Matthew Moorhouse, accompanied the punitive expedition. He was unsuccessful in his efforts to mediate a solution before the massacre occurred.

== Background ==
The short Rufus River connects Lake Victoria, New South Wales with the Murray River, very close to both the current borders with Victoria to the south and South Australia to the west.

The local Maraura people probably had their first encounter with the British when Charles Sturt travelled down the river in 1830. There is no record of other colonists in the region until overlanders Joseph Hawdon and Charles Bonney drove 335 cattle from Sydney to Adelaide along the Murray River in 1838.

Edward Eyre and Sturt followed this stock route. By April 1841 at least 36 overlanding parties had travelled the track, bringing with them about 480 people; 90,000 sheep and 15,000 cattle; as well as horses, bullocks, drays and goods through the territory of the Maraura.

Serious skirmishes between the overlanders and the Maraura began in 1839. In October of that year, overlander George McLeod (an associate of Charles Sturt), had a significant battle with the Maraura. The Aboriginal warriors had forced McLeod's group to retreat to their drays, but after half an hour of sharp shooting, the overlanders drove the Maraura away and into the river. A stockman from another group passing through the region around the same time was killed in a separate conflict.

A month later, an overlanding group led by stockman Alexander Buchanan and conveying a herd of 18,000 sheep, battled with Maraura warriors near the Murray-Darling junction. An estimated six Aborigines were killed.

== Inman-Field overlanding incident of 1841 ==
After the violence of late 1839, overlanding through Maraura country was relatively uneventful until 1841. In the early months of that year, pastoralist James Chisholm organised a droving party to take 5,000 of his sheep from his property near Goulburn, New South Wales to the markets of Adelaide. Chisholm placed Henry Inman and Henry Field in charge of the party. Inman had previously been appointed as the first chief of the South Australian Police, but was suspended and sacked in 1840.

Conflict between Inman's overlanding group and Aboriginal people occurred early in the journey. Inman was speared several times as they traveled along the Murrumbidgee River. A spear-head remained lodged in his abdomen for several weeks. When the drive reached the Murray-Darling junction, the Maraura started to spear the sheep and harass the shepherds.

On 16 April 1841, Inman's group was confronted by around 300-400 Maraura warriors near the Rufus River. The overlanding party were defeated and fled; the Maraura took over their 5,000 sheep. One of Inman's shepherds was badly wounded but later recovered.

When the news of Inman's defeat reached Adelaide, a strong party of South Australian mounted police, led by Major Thomas Shuldham O'Halloran, was sent to recover the sheep from the Maraura. Fearing a possible scandal if the police shot large numbers of Aboriginal people, Governor George Gawler recalled O'Halloran's party before they reached the Rufus River.

Displeased with the government's lack of action, a vigilante group of 14 armed and mounted volunteers, led by Henry Field, a member of the original party, set out on 7 May to recover the sheep. Waiting for them at the Rufus River were around 500 Aboriginal warriors, who inflicted another defeat on the colonists. Field was wounded and two horses were killed. None of the sheep was recovered and Field's group returned to Adelaide.

The newly appointed Governor of South Australia, George Grey, ordered the formation of a large group of police, volunteers, and special constables under the leadership of Major O’Halloran. This group of 68 armed and mounted men was to proceed to the Rufus River to capture some Maraura and protect the overlanding party of Charles Langhorne, which was known to be travelling through the region. The expedition such prominent South Australian colonists as James Rigby Beevor, James Collins Hawker, Henry Inman, Matthew Moorhouse, and Alexander Tolmer.

The group left Adelaide on 31 May 1841 and reached Maraura country on 20 June. They were too late to protect Langhorne's droving party, who were defeated in a battle with 500 Maraura warriors at the Rufus River. Most of Langhorne's cattle and provisions had been plundered, and four of his stockmen killed. Five Aboriginal people were shot dead in the skirmish.

O'Halloran's group did save the remainder of Langhorne's party and recovered some of his cattle. They scoured the region finding around a thousand carcasses of Inman's sheep, but were unable to engage with or capture any Maraura. Soon after returned to Adelaide.

== Massacre ==
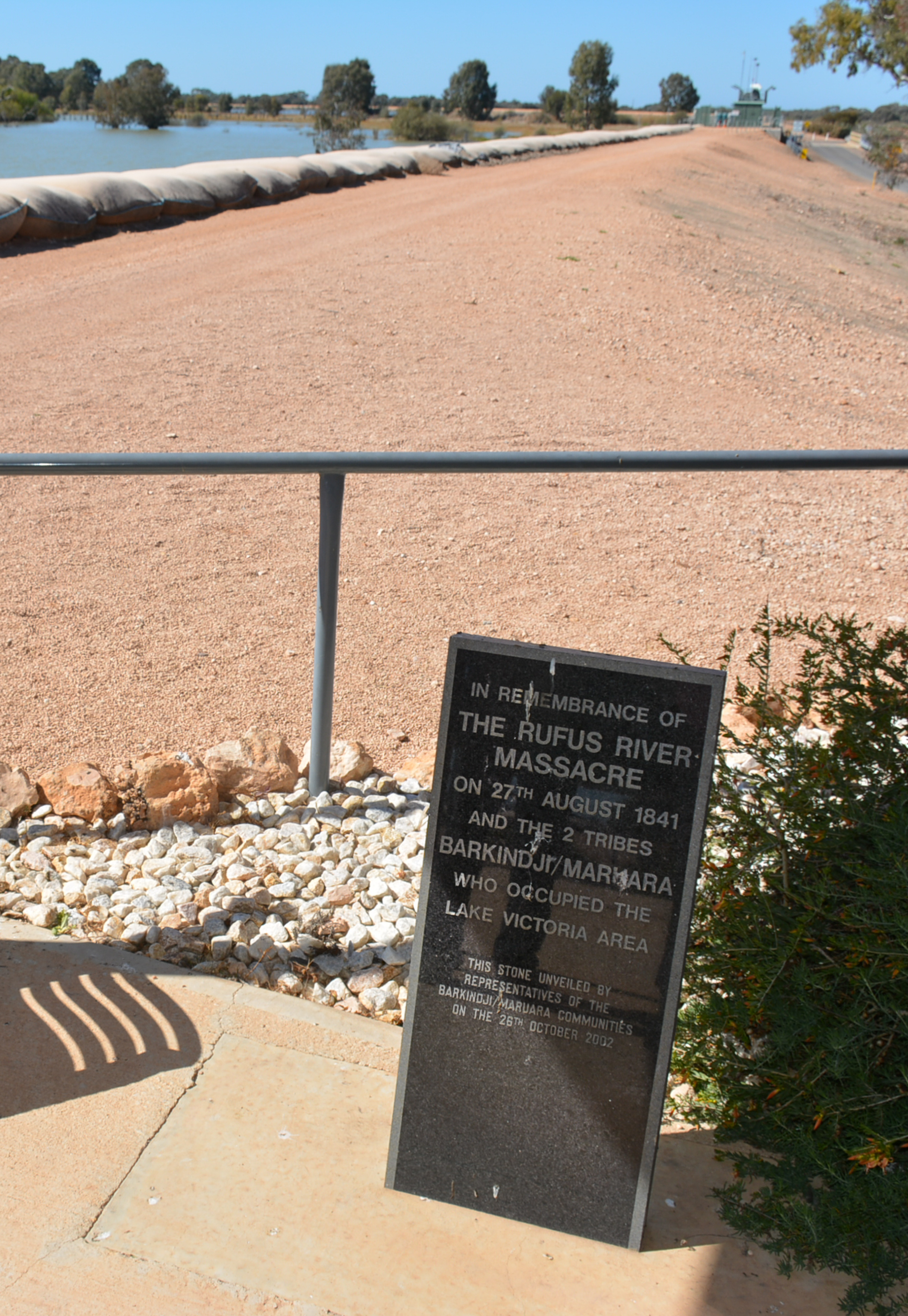
A memorial on the embankment at Lake Victoria.

By this stage the Maraura had inflicted three significant defeats upon the colonists in three months. They also had evaded two large police punitive expeditions sent to their country.

In August 1841, another official police expedition, including 16 troopers, 12 volunteers, 3 Aboriginal guides, and Matthew Moorhouse, Protector of Aborigines, was sent out to the Rufus River. Moorhouse hoped to mediate a settlement, to protect a group of overlanders led by William Robinson and Philip Levi. This detachment of police was commanded by Sub-Inspector Bernard Shaw.

The police patrol reached the Rufus River region on 27 August. They learned that Robinson's droving party had already come into conflict with the Maraura on the previous day. In that skirmish, the Maraura blocked Robinsons path,losing five men dead and ten wounded in the ensuing skirmish,that lasted around 45 minutes.

After the police patrol met up with Robinson's group on 27 August, they came across a group of around 150 Maraura warriors near the junction of the Rufus River and Lake Victoria. This group of Maraura were not preventing the passage of the colonists, nor did they make any hostile motion to the police or the overlanders. Moorhouse, however, after negotiating with them through his Aboriginal interpreter Pungke Pungke, concluded that they were threatening and handed command of the situation over to Sub-Inspector Shaw.

Robinson's men began firing at the Aborigines, driving them into the Rufus River. Shaw's group of police and volunteers proceeded to join in the killing. According to Moorhouse's later report, nearly 30 Aboriginal people were killed, and about 10 wounded. Robinson reported that 30-40 were killed, with around the same number wounded. A large majority of the wounded would be expected to die from their wounds, because Aboriginal medicine was ill-equipped to deal with gunshot wounds. Only one colonist was wounded; Robinson was speared in his left arm as he shot an Aboriginal man in the river.

To conciliate the police and overlanders, Maraura women were brought to the colonists after the massacre. Shaw and Robinson permitted their men to have sex with these women despite the disapproval of Moorhouse.

Four Maraura were taken prisoner, including a wounded boy, two women, and a man named Pul Kanta. The wounded boy and one of the woman were soon released. The other woman (whose husband had been killed in the slaughter) was given to interpreter Pungke Pungke as a wife. Pul Kanta remained in custody to be taken to Adelaide. He tried to escape the following day by diving off a high cliff into the Murray River but was re-captured after being shot and wounded three times.

Concerns in the colony and in England about the large number of Aboriginal people killed in the massacre, forced Governor Grey to organise an magisterial inquiry into the shootings. Chaired by Sturt, the participants were questioned, including Aboriginal captive Pul Kanta. The magistrates eventually concluded that the actions of the British parties had been justified and even praiseworthy. They also determined that the overall conflict in the region was due in part to the overlanders engaging in sexual relations with Aboriginal women without giving the food and clothing they had promised. An escalating cycle of conflicts resulted. Aboriginal groups stole thousands of sheep in retaliation. Magistrate Edward John Eyre thought the punishment meted out at the Rufus River to the Maraura by Shaw and Robinson was not sufficiently harsh enough.

Moorhouse's account of casualties was disputed by Robinson, who stated that "thirty to forty were killed, and as many wounded". James Collins Hawker wrote in his book Early Experiences in South Australia (1899: p. 79): "The firing lasted about fifteen minutes, 30 natives were killed, 10 wounded and 4 taken prisoner...this was the Protector's report but in after years when I was residing on the Murray and had learnt the language of the natives, I ascertained that a much larger number had been killed". In his travels through the region several years later, Charles Sturt documented that thirty of the killed were interred in a mass grave on the banks of Lake Victoria, the mound of which was still visible.

== See also ==
- Australian frontier wars
- List of massacres of Indigenous Australians
- Maria (brigantine)
