= Kureinji language =

Extinct Australian Aboriginal language

Kureinji
- Keramin
- Northern Sunraysia
- Region: New South Wales
- Ethnicity: Kureinji
- Extinct: (date missing)
- Language family: Pama–Nyungan: Lower Murray; Kureinji

Language codes
- ISO 639-3: None (mis)
- Glottolog: nort2756
- AIATSIS: D6.1

Kureinji is an extinct language of southwest New South Wales. It is also called Keramin and Kemendok, though it is not clear if these are dialects or synonyms.

Keramin is also spelled Karin, Kerinma, Karinma, Karingma, Keramin; other names are Orangema, Pintwa.

Horgen suggests that Yerreyerre is another name for Keramin, but this name may refer to other languages.
