= Maraura =

Indigenous Australian people of the Murray-Darling junction

The Maraura or Marrawarra people are an Aboriginal group whose traditional lands are located in Far West New South Wales and South Australia, Australia.

== Language ==
The Maraura spoke the southernmost dialect of Paakantyi. A wordlist of the language was taken down by John Bulmer.

== Country ==
According to Tindale, the Maraura's traditional domain lands consisted of some 2,200 square miles (5,700 km^{2}) of territory extending west from Wentworth along the northern bank of the Murray River downstream to Chowilla and Ral Ral, in South Australia. Inland they extended west to the anabranch of the Darling River as far as Popilta Lake, and upstream to Avoca.

== Society ==
The Maraura is known to have been divided into at least 5 hordes

- Condelkoo
- Boolkarlie
- Moattilkoo
- Bullalre
- Toopparlie

A Nanya group is also recorded. A. A. Radcliffe-Brown mentions also a Yakumku sub-tribe of the Maraura, dwelling around Lake Victoria.

The social organization was dual, centered on the relations between two moieties, the Kilpara and the Makwara/Makgara.

== Culture ==
In relating their tribal mythology to Tindale, -the tale in question was an account of how the hero Wa:ku sought to marry two sisters- his informants, he recorded, would draw pictures on the ground, illustrating the narrative. A. P. Elkin cites this as an example corroborating a theory he advanced according to which rock art engravings functioned as mnemonics, with a propaedeutic function in helping to pass on to initiate the legendary lore of the elders.

Tindale recorded their legends, particularly regarding the crow and eagle, in a work published in 1939.

== History ==
According to hearsay recorded by George Taplin, between the years 1831 and 1836 the Maraura migrated down the Darling River to their modern lands. According to an early report (1842) the South Australian Kaurna referred to this area as Mettelittela Yerta ("the stolen land" or "the land of thieves"). They ambushed and killed stockmen, which resulted in many if not most of the tribe are said to have been killed, during 1839–1846, by European explorers and aggressive overlanders—e.g. at the Rufus River massacre (where the South Australian Police were also involved).

Lockhart indicated that in 1857 the Maraura frequented Lake Victoria in summer and the back plains in winter after rains had filled small waterholes.

Though elopement, which was severely frowned on and subject to sanctions by tribal law, is not known to have been the motive, sometime around 1863 two members of the Nanya branch of the Maraura left their horde near settlement of Wentworth near the Murray River and fled into bushland. They and their descendants, by then grown to some 28 people, were found in the 1890s, some three decades later. Shortly afterwards, within 3 years, they were rounded up and forced to become "civilized". The outline of the story, the locale and the dates, coincide with an oral history taken from the informant Pinkie Mack, in which however, the couple were members of the Yaraldi people.

== Notable people ==
- Nanya (1835–1895) was one of the last Aboriginal people of New South Wales to persist in living according to the traditional tribal ways. He led his family into exile - it was later thought by ethnographic inquirers that he had intermarried with a woman of his own Makwarra moiety, a crime in native law punishable by death. The area he settled in was the harsh "Scotia blocks", a waterless tract of mallee land between the Great Darling Anabranch and the South Australian border. There they managed to subsist for 3 decades. His group, comprising 12 men, 8 women and 10 children, were persuaded to come back in by aboriginal trackers in 1893 who led them back to Popiltah station. They lived on in Pooncarie, preferring that to a civilized settlement. Many of his offspring died from diseases contracted from white settlers. His son Billy, who had received an education in Adelaide, is recorded to have died in custody.
- Pul Kanta (c.1815–?), also known as Pulcanti, was a survivor of the Rufus River massacre who was taken prisoner after the killings. He attempted to escape by diving off the cliffs into the Murray River but was later recaptured after being shot and wounded. He presented evidence to a magisterial inquiry in Adelaide concerning the Rufus River massacre before being allowed to return to his country where he had a wife and two children. He later acted as a guide for Charles Sturt in his expedition up the Darling River.
- Nadbuck (c.1800–?) was a warrior who participated in the skirmishes with British overlanders and police around the Rufus River region during the late 1830s and early 1840s. He survived the Rufus River massacre of 1841 and later became a trusted guide for Charles Sturt in his expedition along the Darling River. The locality of Nadbuck near Broken Hill is named after him.

== Alternative names ==
- Mareawura, Mare-aura, Maroura, Marowra, Marowera
- Marraa" Warree", Marrawarra
- Waimbio (wimbaia = wimbadja (man)) (Note: wimbaia, according to A. R. Radcliffe-Brown, is the general word for "man" used in all the Darling river languages.)
- Wimbaja, Wiimbaio
- Beriko (language name)
- Ilaila (i:la = no)

== Some words ==
- kambia (father) (the term used by males)
- ŋamaga (ngamara) (mother) (the term used by males)
- kanau (wedge-tailed eagle|eaglehawk) (also a totem)
- namba (silver fish) (also a totem)
- pudali (a star) (also a totem)
- pil'ta (opossum) (also a totem)
- pärndu (Murray cod) (also a totem)
- thandoa (white man)

== Sources ==
- Berndt, Ronald Murray; Berndt, Catherine Helen; Stanton, John E. (1993). A World that was: The Yaraldi of the Murray River and the Lakes, South Australia. UBC Press. ISBN 978-0-774-80478-3.
- Brown, A. R. (July–December 1918). "Notes on the social organization of Australian tribes". The Journal of the Royal Anthropological Institute of Great Britain and Ireland. 48: 222–253. doi:10.2307/2843422. JSTOR 2843422.
- Bulmer, John (1886). "Marowera Language" (PDF). In Curr, Edward Micklethwaite (ed.). The Australian race: its origin, languages, customs, place of landing in Australia and the routes by which it spread itself over the continent. Vol. 2. Melbourne: J. Ferres. pp. 240–241.
- Elkin, A. P. (December 1949). "The Origin and Interpretation of Petroglyphs in South-East Australia". Oceania. 20 (2): 119–157. doi:10.1002/j.1834-4461.1949.tb00522.x. JSTOR 40328236.
- Hercus, Luise (1984). "The Marawara language of Yelta: Interpreting Linguistic Records of the Past" (PDF). Aboriginal History. 8: 56–62.
- Hercus, Luise (1989). "Three Linguistic Studies from Far South-Western NSW" (PDF). Aboriginal History. 13 (1): 45–62.
- Hercus, Luise A. (2011). Paakantyi Dictionary. AIATSIS. ISBN 978-0-646-15261-5.
- Lindsay, Robert (1986). "Nanya (1835–1895)". Australian Dictionary of Biography. Vol. 10. Melbourne University Press.
- Tindale, Norman Barnett (1939). "Eagle and crow myths of the Maraura tribe, Lower Darling River, New South Wales". Records of the South Australian Museum. 6 (3). Adelaide: 243–261.
- Tindale, Norman Barnett (1974). "Maraura (NSW)". Aboriginal Tribes of Australia: Their Terrain, Environmental Controls, Distribution, Limits, and Proper Names. Australian National University Press. ISBN 978-0-708-10741-6.
