= Erawirung =

Aboriginal people of South Australia

The Erawirung (Yirawirung, Jirawirung) people, also known as Yirau, Juju and other names, were an Aboriginal Australian people whose traditional territory was located in what is today the Riverland of South Australia. They consisted of sub-groups or clans, including Jeraruk, Rankbirit and Wilu, and have been referred to as Meru people, which was a larger grouping which could also include the Ngawait and Ngaiawang peoples.

== Language ==
The Erawirung appear to have spoken a dialect of the Yuyu language common to their neighbours. This language group is alternatively called the Meru language group, and is included under this name on the AIATSIS language map.

== Country ==
According to Norman Tindale, Erawirung traditional lands covered about 1,300 square miles (3,400 km^{2}), around the eastern bank of the Murray River, reaching from north of Paringa past Loxton into the sandy stretches some 24 kilometres (15 mi) to its south. Their western boundary reached from Rufus Creek into the vicinity of the Overland Corner.

== Social organisation and economy ==
The Erawirung were divided into hordes, of which the following are known:

- Jeraruk
- Rankbirit (totem = eaglehawk)
- Wilu

They practised circumcision alone, but not dental evulsion in initiation rites.

Chert mining in two of their localities, at Springcart Gully and at a site south of Renmark, formed an important element of the Erawirung economy, and the areas were strongly defended from neighbouring tribes.

== History ==
Early ethnographers often classified the small Erawirung tribe as one of a collective group named the Meru people. The Erawirung were not mentioned by the nearby Jarildekald when interviewed by Ronald Murray Berndt in the late 1930s – early 1940s.

== Alternative names ==
- Eramwirrangu
- Erawiruck
- Jeraruk
- Yerraruck
- Yirau
- Pomp-malkie
- Meru (meru meaning 'man')
- Juju (Maraura exonym, ju being their word for 'no')
- Yuyu, You-you
- Rankbirit
- Wilu, Willoo

== Sources ==
- Berndt, Ronald Murray; Berndt, Catherine Helen; Stanton, John E. (1993). A World that was: The Yaraldi of the Murray River and the Lakes, South Australia. UBC Press. ISBN 978-0-774-80478-3.
- Fison, Lorimer; Howitt, Alfred William (1880). Kamilaroi and Kurnai (PDF). Melbourne: G Robinson.
- Hale, Herbert M.; Tindale, Norman (1930). "Notes on some human remains in the Lower Murray Valley, South Australia". Records of the South Australian Museum. 4 (2). Adelaide: 145–218.
- Shaw; Taplin, George (1879). "Overland Corner Tribe, River Murray" (PDF). Folklore, manners, customs and languages of the South Australian aborigines. Adelaide: E Spiller, Acting Government Printer. pp. 28–29.
- Tindale, Norman Barnett (1974). "Erawirung (NSW)". Aboriginal Tribes of Australia: Their Terrain, Environmental Controls, Distribution, Limits, and Proper Names. Australian National University Press. ISBN 978-0-708-10741-6.
