= Rufus River =

River in New South Wales, Australia

Coordinates: 34°03′S 141°15′E

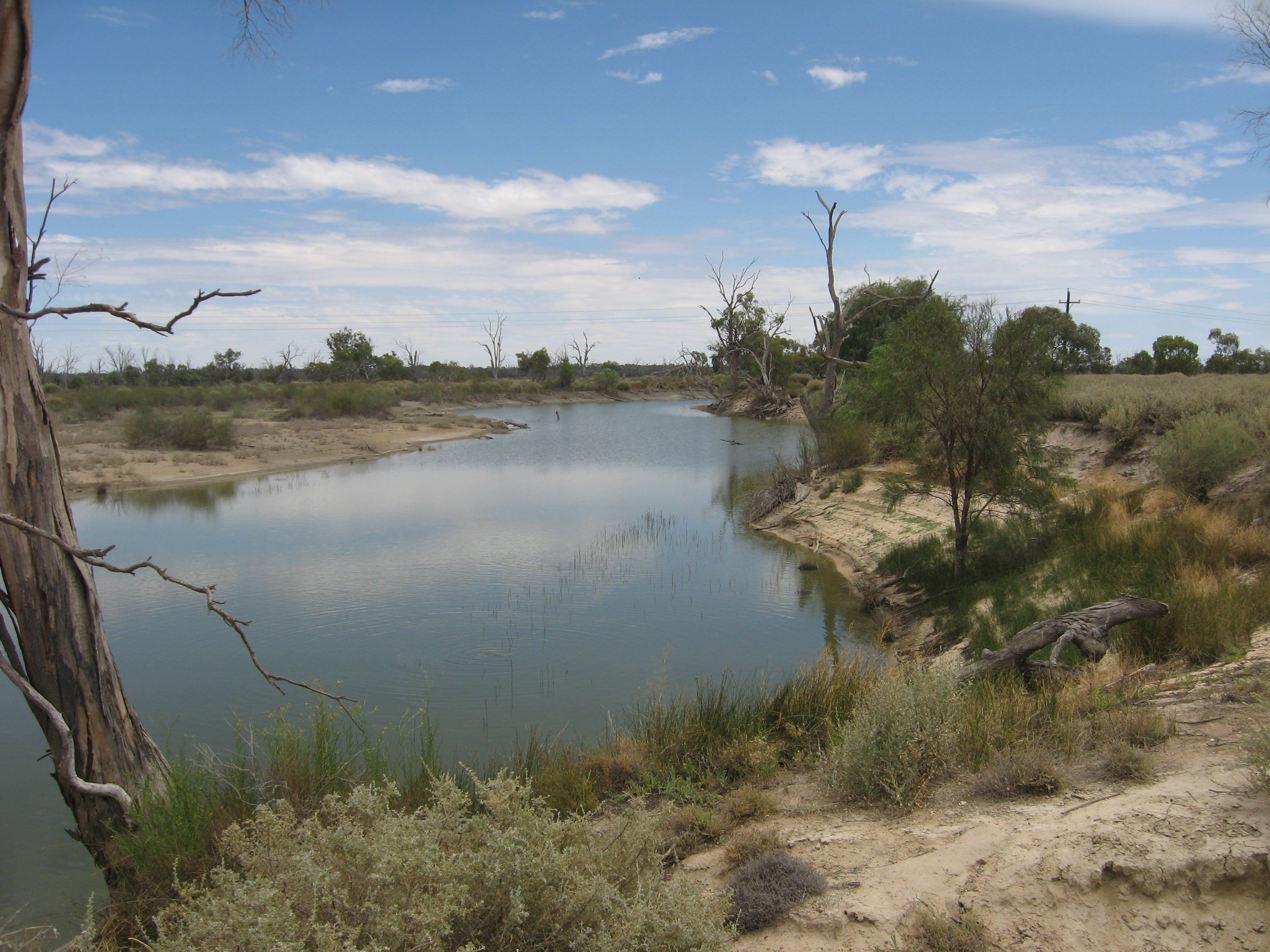
- A section of the Rufus River between Lake Victoria and the Murray River, near the Lake Victoria outlet regulator
- Etymology: In honour of George Macleay, who had red hair

Location
- Country: Australia
- State: New South Wales
- Region: IBRA: Riverina
- District: Far West
- Municipality: Wentworth

Physical characteristics
- Source: Lake Victoria
- Mouth: confluence with the Murray River
  - location: at Devils Elbow, near Rufus
- Length: 5 km (3.1 mi)

Basin features
- River system: Murray River, Murray–Darling basin

Rufus River, a watercourse of the Murray catchment and part of the Murray–Darling basin, is located in south western New South Wales, Australia.

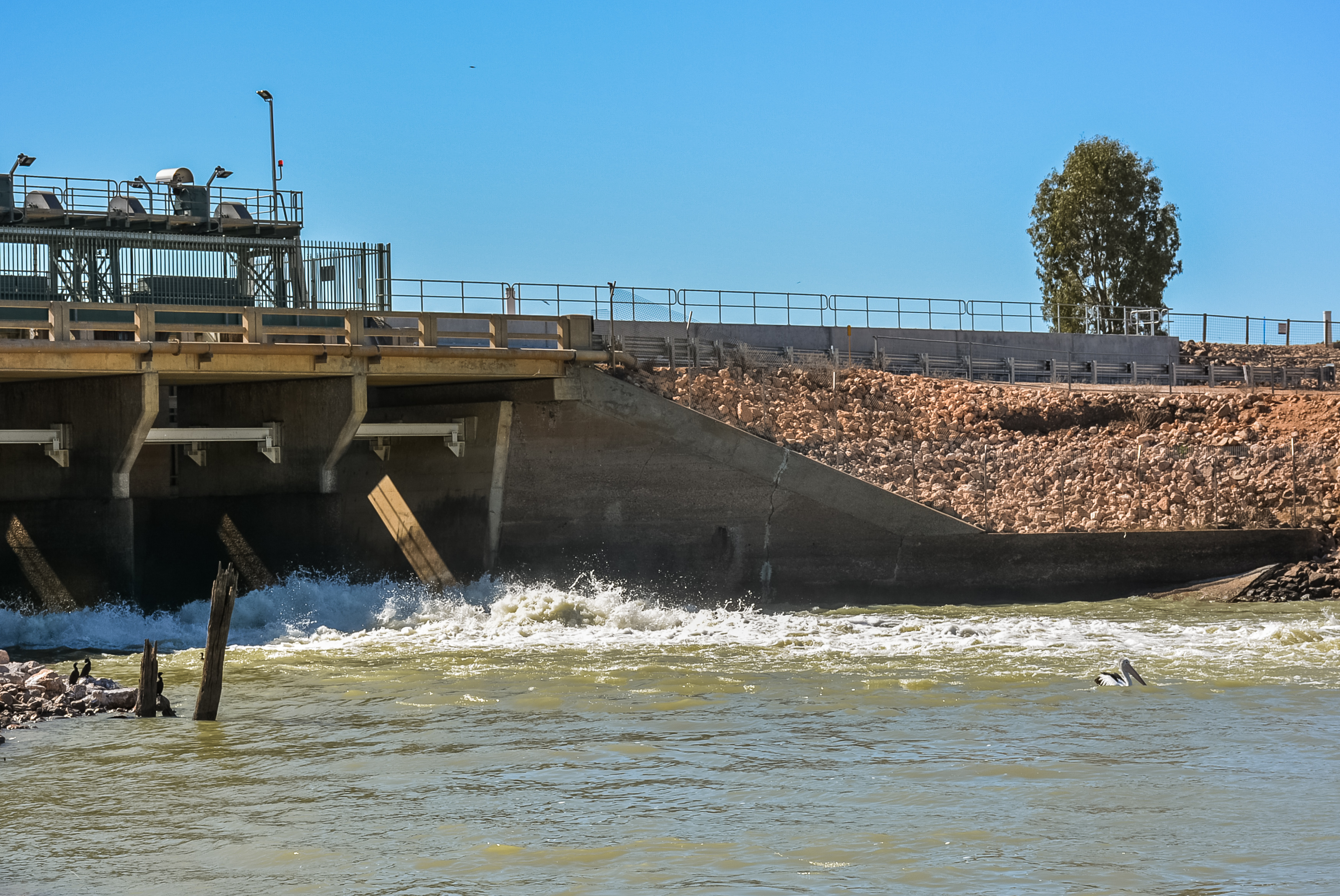
Water entering the Rufus River from Lake Victoria.

The river leaves Lake Victoria, flowing generally west and then south-west, before reaching its confluence with the Murray River, at Lock 7, near Rufus.

Rufus River was visited by European explorer, Charles Sturt, in 1830, and named after his red-haired (or rufus) travelling companion, George Macleay.

A number of conflicts between European and Aboriginal people in 1841 led to the Rufus River massacre.

== See also ==
- Rivers of New South Wales
- List of rivers of Australia
