= Lower Murray languages =

Family of Pama–Nyungan indigenous Australian languages

Lower Murray
- Ngarinyeric-Yithayithic
- Geographic distribution: Australia
- Linguistic classification: Pama–Nyungan: Southeastern; Victorian; Lower Murray
- Subdivisions: Yaralde; Ngayawung (†); Yuyu (†); Keramin (†); Yitha-Yitha moribund

Language codes
- Glottolog: lowe1401
- Lower Murray languages (green) among other Pama–Nyungan (tan)

The Lower Murray languages form a branch of the Pama–Nyungan family. They are:

- Lower Murray
  - Ngarinyeri (Yaralde, Yaraldi, Ngarrindjeri, Ramindjeri)
  - Ngayawung (Ngayawang) †
  - Yuyu (Ngintait, Ngarkat) †
  - Keramin †
  - Yitha-Yitha moribund

Dixon treats these as isolates, either because they are not close or are too poorly attested to demonstrate they are close. Bowern (2011) adds Peramangk.
