= Lake Victoria (New South Wales) =

Lake in the state of New South Wales, Australia

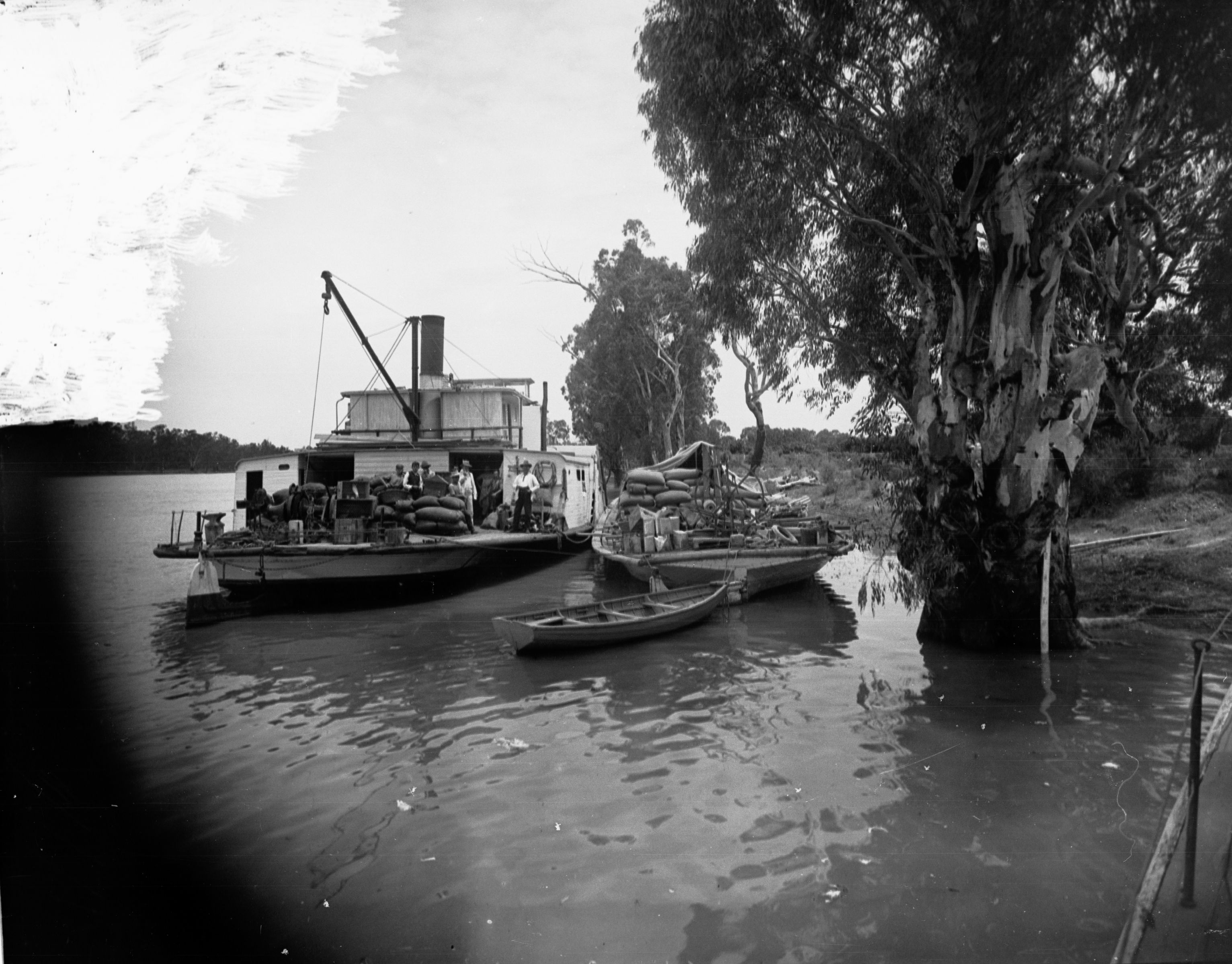
- Paddlesteamer landing at Lake Victoria, ca. 1925

- Location within New South Wales
- Location: Far West, New South Wales
- Coordinates: 33°59′40″S 141°16′26″E
- Primary inflows: Murray River, Darling River
- Primary outflows: Rufus River
- Catchment area: Murray–Darling basin
- Basin countries: Australia
- Settlements: Wentworth
- References: IBRA: Riverina

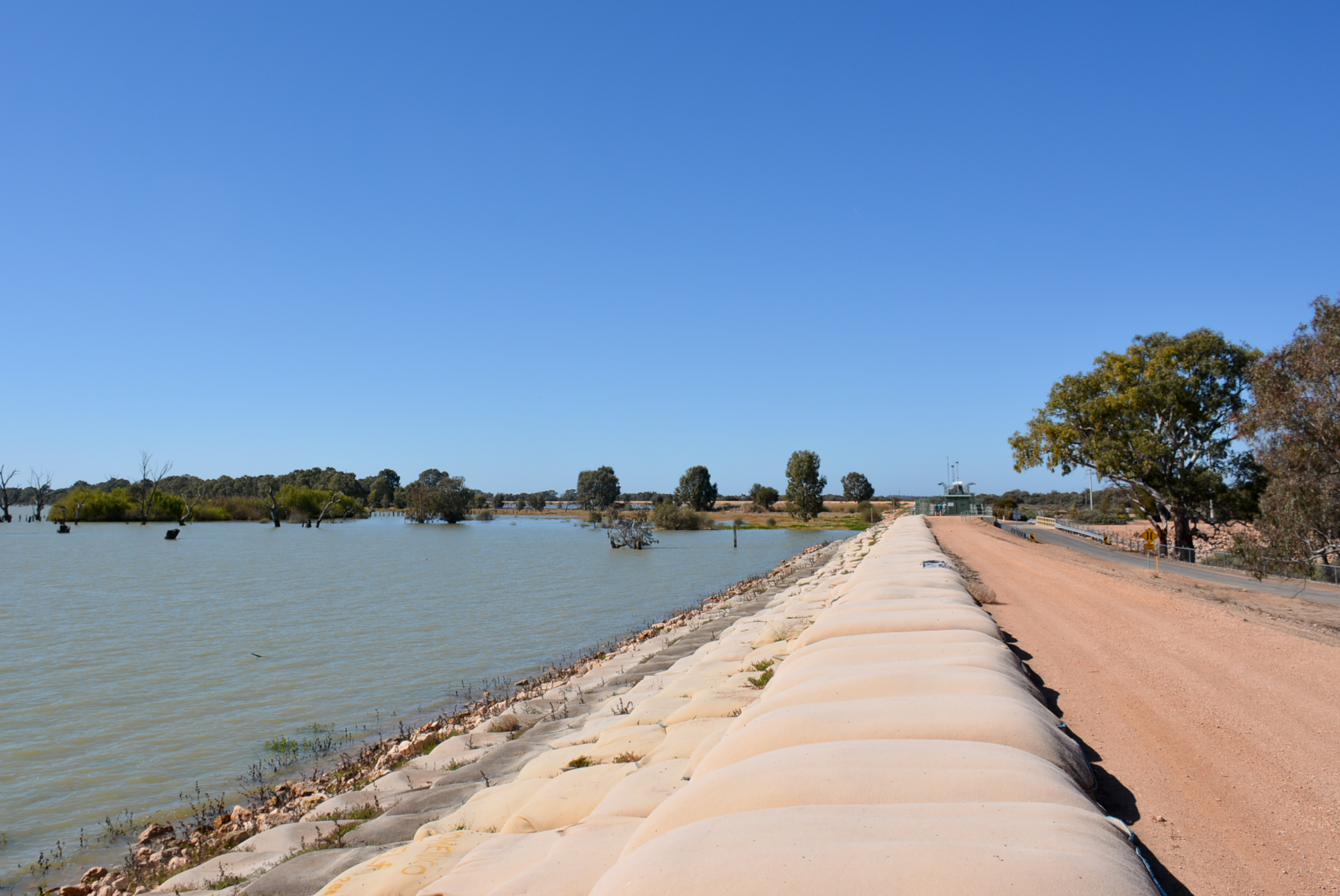
Lake Victoria embankment

Lake Victoria, a naturally occurring shallow freshwater lake of the Murray catchment and part of the Murray–Darling basin, is located in the western Riverina region of south western New South Wales, Australia.

The lake is approximately 60 kilometres (37 mi) downstream of the junction of the Murray and Darling rivers and draws its flow from Frenchmans Creek, an anabranch of the Murray above Lock 9. The lake feeds back to the Murray River below Lock 7 via Rufus River.

The lake's capacity was increased in the 1920s when an embankment was constructed and regulators were installed to control the release of water. It provides a storage of water to manage the regulated release of agreed minimum flows down the Murray into South Australia. Even though Lake Victoria is in New South Wales, it is operated by SA Water, the South Australian water authority, on behalf of River Murray Water, a division of the Murray-Darling Basin Commission.

When full, the lake holds 677 GL, covers an area of 12,200 ha, and has a maximum depth of about 5.5 m.

== Geography ==
=== Climate ===
Lake Victoria has a subtropical semi-arid climate (Köppen: BSh) with very hot, slightly wetter summers and mild, very dry winters. Extreme temperatures ranged from 47.8 °C (118.0 °F) on 21 January 1912 to −3.9 °C (25.0 °F) on 6 June 1982. The wettest recorded day was 26 February 1939 with 97.5 mm (3.84 in) of rainfall.

Climate data for Lake Victoria Storage (34.04°S 141.27°E) (26 m (85 ft) AMSL) (1922-2025)
Month	Jan	Feb	Mar	Apr	May	Jun	Jul	Aug	Sep	Oct	Nov	Dec	Year
Record high °C (°F)	47.5 (117.5)	46.4 (115.5)	42.0 (107.6)	39.2 (102.6)	32.2 (90.0)	26.5 (79.7)	26.5 (79.7)	32.3 (90.1)	37.5 (99.5)	41.9 (107.4)	45.5 (113.9)	47.8 (118.0)	47.8 (118.0)
Mean daily maximum °C (°F)	32.3 (90.1)	31.8 (89.2)	28.6 (83.5)	23.7 (74.7)	19.2 (66.6)	15.8 (60.4)	15.5 (59.9)	17.3 (63.1)	20.7 (69.3)	24.0 (75.2)	27.4 (81.3)	30.5 (86.9)	23.9 (75.0)
Mean daily minimum °C (°F)	16.7 (62.1)	16.5 (61.7)	14.1 (57.4)	10.6 (51.1)	7.7 (45.9)	5.7 (42.3)	5.2 (41.4)	6.1 (43.0)	8.1 (46.6)	10.6 (51.1)	13.3 (55.9)	15.3 (59.5)	10.8 (51.5)
Record low °C (°F)	8.0 (46.4)	8.5 (47.3)	5.0 (41.0)	0.5 (32.9)	−2.0 (28.4)	−3.9 (25.0)	−3.5 (25.7)	−3.0 (26.6)	−1.0 (30.2)	2.2 (36.0)	4.1 (39.4)	7.0 (44.6)	−3.9 (25.0)
Average precipitation mm (inches)	19.8 (0.78)	17.9 (0.70)	14.4 (0.57)	18.7 (0.74)	23.0 (0.91)	22.5 (0.89)	23.4 (0.92)	23.3 (0.92)	24.2 (0.95)	26.8 (1.06)	24.3 (0.96)	19.7 (0.78)	258.2 (10.17)
Average precipitation days (≥ 0.2 mm)	3.0	2.7	2.9	4.3	6.6	7.6	9.1	8.4	6.2	5.8	4.9	3.6	65.1
Source: Bureau of Meteorology (1922-2025)

== See also ==
- Rufus River
