= Twelve Apostles Marine National Park =

Marine national park in Victoria, Australia

- IUCN category II (national park)
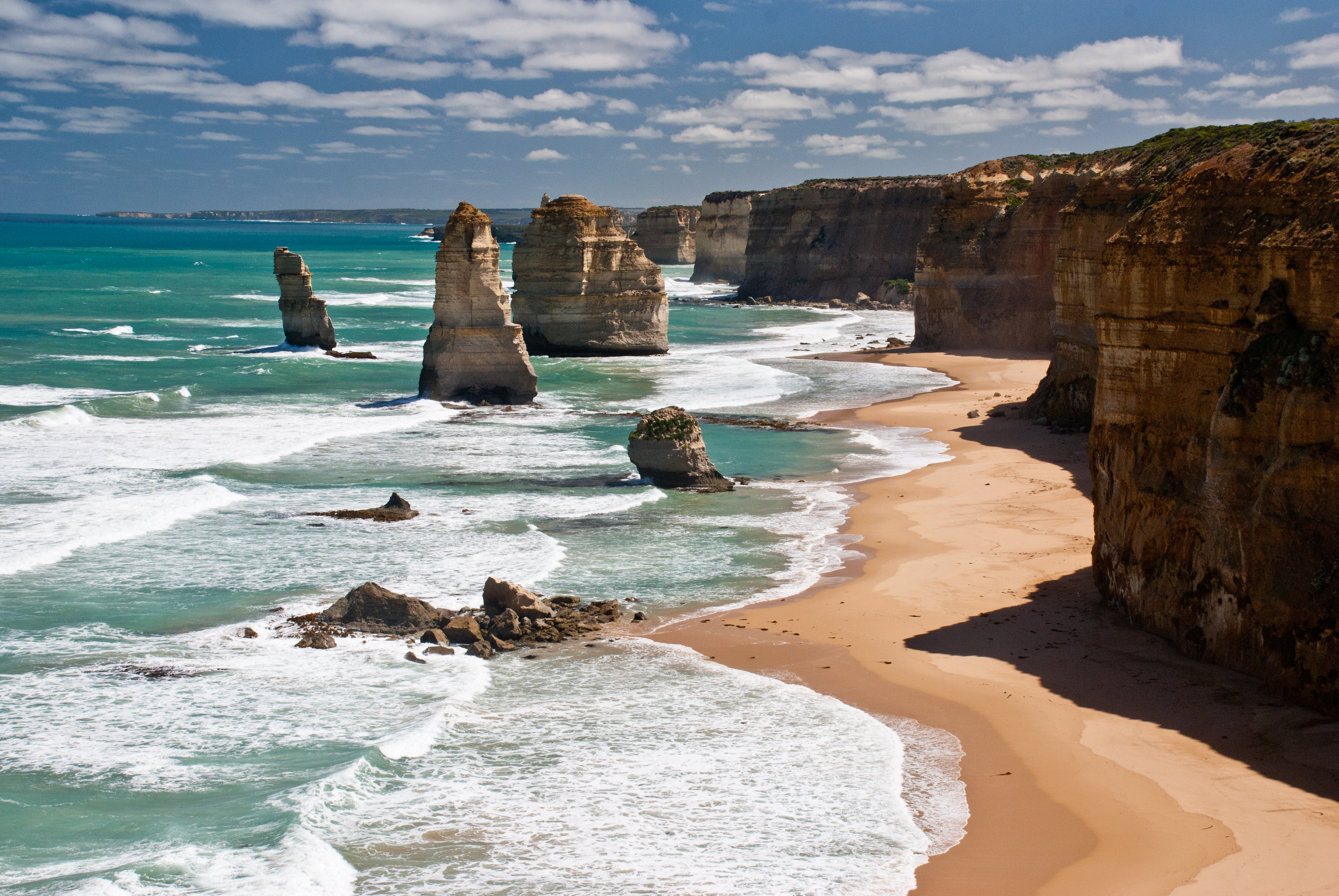
- The Twelve Apostles, located within the marine national park

- Location within Victoria
- Location: Victoria
- Nearest city: Port Campbell
- Coordinates: 38°40′S 143°06′E
- Area: 75 km^{2} (29 sq mi)
- Established: 16 November 2002
- Governing body: Parks Victoria
- Website: http://parkweb.vic.gov.au/explore/parks/twelve-apostles-marine-national-park

Aerial views of Port Campbell National Park and Twelve Apostles Marine National Park.

The Twelve Apostles Marine National Park is a protected marine national park located on the south-west coast of Victoria, Australia. The 7,500-hectare (19,000-acre) marine park is situated near Port Campbell and is named after the scenic Twelve Apostles rock stacks, and contains the wreck of the clipper Loch Ard, wrecked on Mutton Bird Island in 1878. The marine park borders Port Campbell and Great Otway National Parks.

== See also ==
- Protected areas of Victoria
- List of national parks of Australia
