= Clifton Beach, Victoria =

Beach in Victoria, Australia

Clifton Beach
- Beach
- Clifton Beach
- Interactive map of Clifton Beach
- Coordinates: 38°40′41″S 143°07′27″E
- Location: Princetown, Victoria, Australia
- Water bodies: Southern Ocean

Dimensions
  - Length: 1.5 kilometres (0.93 mi)
- Hazard rating: 8/10 (highly hazardous)
- Access: Great Ocean Road

Clifton Beach is a small, isolated ocean beach on the Great Ocean Road coast of south-western Victoria, Australia. The beach lies beneath steep coastal cliffs and is reached by a walking track descending from the surrounding bluff. It is unpatrolled and exposed to the high-energy conditions of the Southern Ocean, with hazards including deep water, strong currents and rough surf.

== Geography and features ==
Clifton Beach lies at the base of coastal cliffs containing exposed sedimentary rock layers deposited on the sea floor over a period of millions of years. The oldest of these sediments date from approximately 25 million years ago. The strata visible in the cliffs dip toward the north-west and form part of an older geological sequence that is not exposed again along the Victorian coast westward to the South Australian border.

The beach forms part of an exposed section of coastline characterised by steep bluffs, rocky shoreline and energetic surf. The surrounding coast is subject to strong currents, deep water and rough wave conditions, and the beach is not patrolled. Swimming is therefore hazardous.

Access is by a foot track descending from the cliffs to the beach. The relative isolation of the site and steep surrounding terrain limit access compared with beaches reached directly from the Great Ocean Road. Dogs are not permitted, and the use of drones within the surrounding protected area requires a permit.

== See also ==
- Gibson Steps
- Peterborough Beach
- Torquay Surf Beach
- Port Campbell Beach
- Wild Dog Cove
- Great Ocean Road
