= Island Archway =

Rock arch in Victoria, Australia

- Rock arch
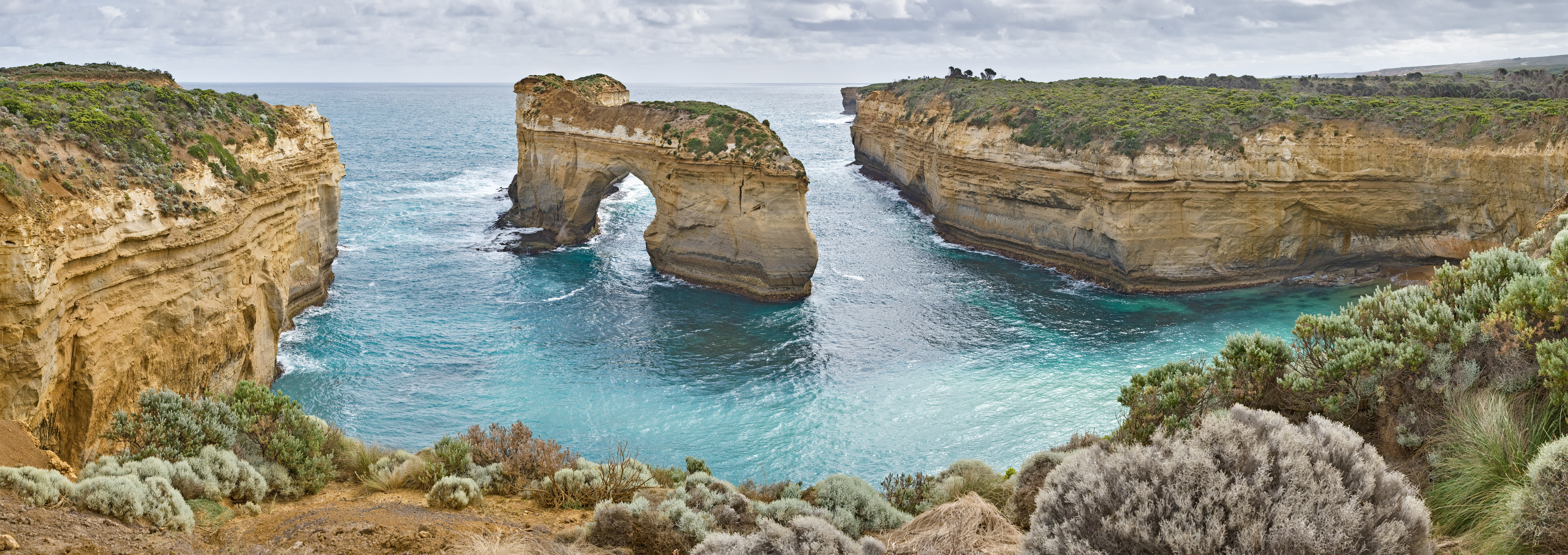
- Island Archway on the Great Ocean Road in Victoria in November 2008.

- Location within Victoria
- Coordinates: 38°38′53.7″S 143°4′4.7″E
- Location: Victoria, Australia

The Island Archway was a 25 metre high, naturally formed rock arch that lay off Loch Ard Gorge, a bay on the south coast of Victoria, Australia. The gate collapsed on 10 June 2009. The arch of rock exposed in the water has been frequently photographed by the numerous international and domestic tourists vacationing in the Great Ocean Road area. The national and international press reported extensively on this geological event.

After the collapse, only two limestone rock pillars remained of the rock arch. The rock cliff consists of a relatively weakly compacted limestone, which lost its rock volume due to erosion by wind and weather and thus became unstable.

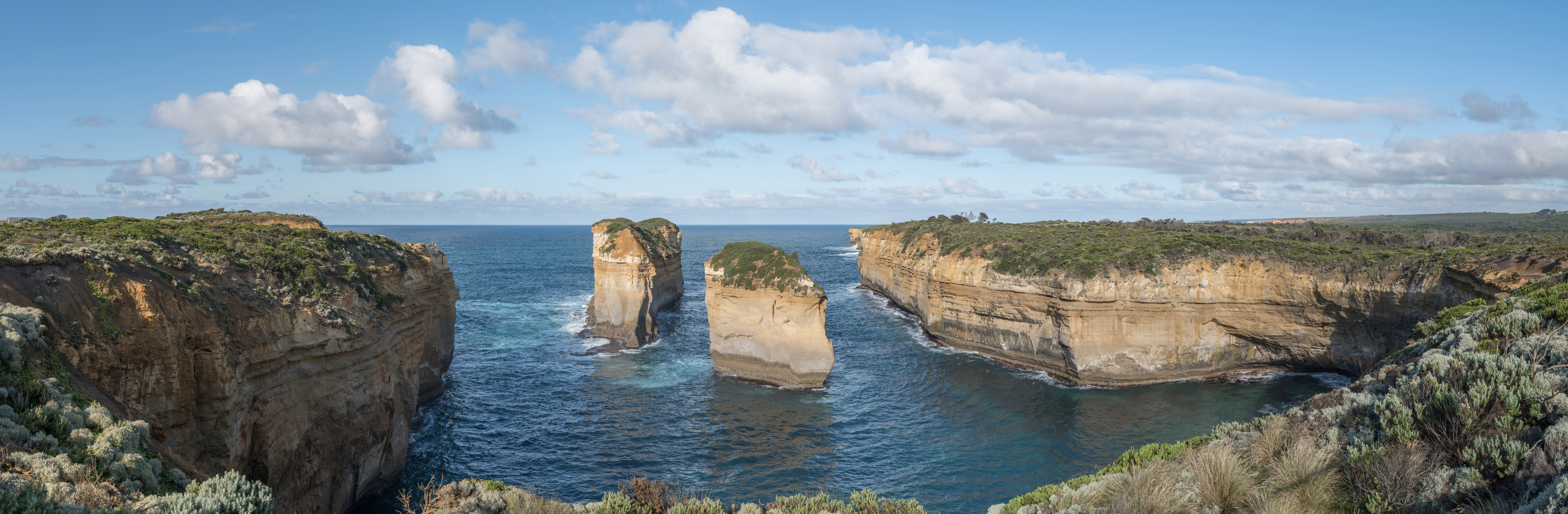
A panoramic view from Tom and Eva Lookout (2023).

The Island Archway was part of a series of free-standing limestone formations on the Great Ocean Road that includes the Twelve Apostles. As early as January 1990, another rock arch on this coast, the inner arch of the London Bridge, had collapsed. The stability of these cliffs is short-lived in geological terms.

Initially, it was believed that the Island Archway would keep its name. The two piers are now officially named after the two castaways Tom and Eva, the only survivors of the Loch Ard shipwreck off Mutton Island, just off the Island Archway.

Since 2011, eight major tourism infrastructure projects have been planned along the coast of the Great Ocean Road, including an information centre at Loch Ard Gorge about local conditions.
