= The Grotto, Victoria =

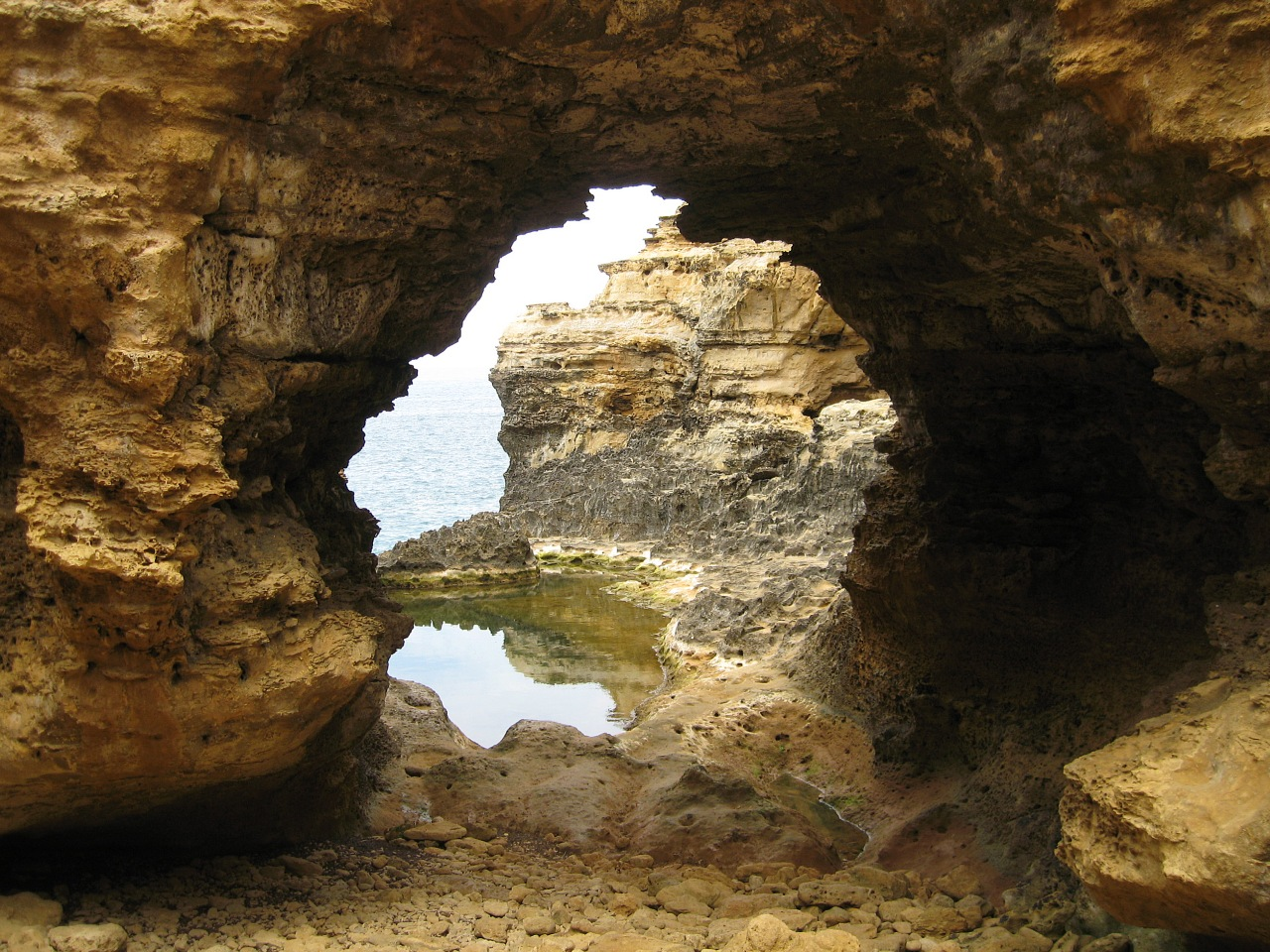
The Grotto

The Grotto (38°36′58″S 142°54′57″E) is a sinkhole geological formation and tourist attraction, found on the Great Ocean Road outside Port Campbell in Victoria, Australia. Wooden steps wind down the cliff face to the bottom, providing visibility of the sea beyond a pool at low tide.

== See also ==
- Gibson Steps, Victoria
- List of sinkholes of Australia
- Loch Ard Gorge
- London Bridge
- The Twelve Apostles, Victoria
