= Port Campbell National Park =

National park in Australia

- IUCN category II (national park)
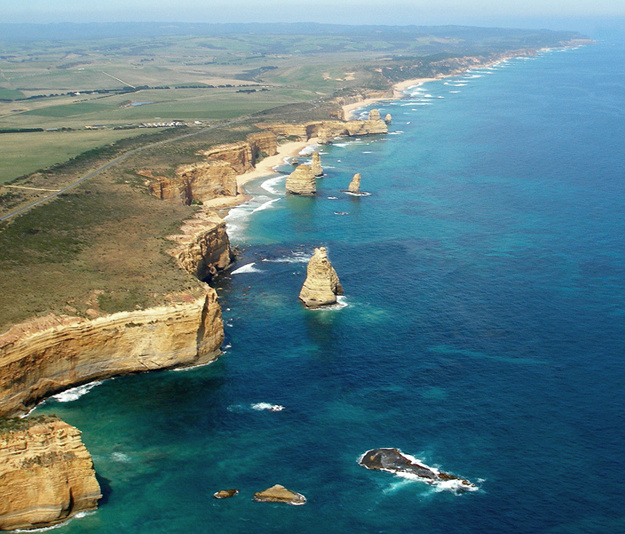
- Port Campbell National Park coastline

- Location within Victoria
- Location: Victoria
- Nearest city: Port Campbell
- Coordinates: 38°39′02″S 143°03′46″E
- Area: 17.5 km^{2} (6.8 sq mi)
- Established: 5 May 1964
- Visitors: circa 2,000,000 (in 1998)
- Governing body: Parks Victoria
- Website: Official website

Aerial views of Port Campbell National Park and Twelve Apostles Marine National Park.

The Port Campbell National Park is a national park in the south-western district of Victoria, Australia. The 1,750-hectare (4,300-acre) national park is situated approximately 190 kilometres (120 mi) south-west of Melbourne and approximately 10 kilometres (6.2 mi) east of Warrnambool. The park is located adjacent to the Great Otway National Park and the Bay of Islands Coastal Park.

== History ==
The Port Campbell National Park was dedicated on 5 May 1964, initially with 700 hectares (1,700 acres), to protect the limestone formations on and near the coastline adjacent to the Great Ocean Road. By 1981 the park had grown to 1,750 hectares (4,300 acres); extending from the eastern side of Curdies Inlet at Peterborough to Point Ronald at Princetown. In 2002, the Port Campbell Professional Fishermen's Association unsuccessfully attempted to block the creation of a proposed marine national park at the Twelve Apostles location, but were satisfied with the later Victorian Government decision not to allow seismic exploration at the same site by Benaris Energy, believing it would harm marine life.

== Features ==
The Port Campbell National Park features an array of sheer cliffs overlooking offshore islets, rock stacks, gorges, arches, and blow-holes. As part of the Shipwreck Coast, it hosts several tourist attractions; including The Twelve Apostles, the London Bridge, Loch Ard Gorge, the Gibson Steps, and The Grotto.

The park is subject to salt-laden breezes, and the cliff-tops are particularly exposed to the harsh weather conditions from the Southern Ocean. However, fragile grasslands and heaths are still able to develop, supporting plant species such as sun orchid and spider orchid. In protected areas, plant life includes beard-heath, bower spinach, coast daisy bush, daisies and cushion bush. The wilder terrain hosts an assortment of she-oaks, dogwoods, correa, messmate, trailing guinea-flower, woolly tea-tree and scented paperbark.

The fauna in the park is largely ornithological; and includes honeyeaters, southern emu and fairy wrens, swamp harriers, rufous bristlebird, peregrine falcons, pelicans, ducks, black swans and egrets. Penguins, terns and dotterels are located along the shoreline, with hooded plovers nesting in exposed locations. Australasian gannets, wandering albatrosses and short-tailed shearwaters live out at sea. Land animals in the park include southern brown bandicoot, swamp antechinuse and echidna.

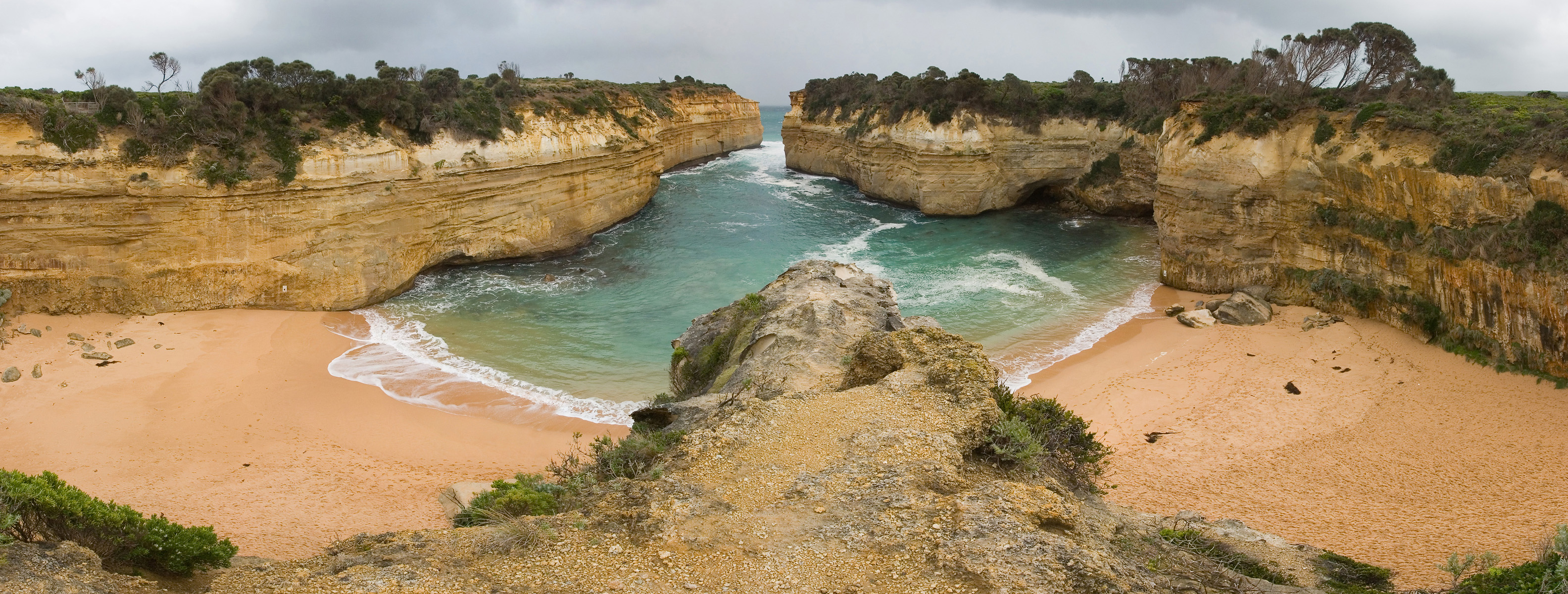
Loch Ard Gorge

== See also ==
- Protected areas of Victoria
- List of national parks of Australia
