= Loch Ard (disambiguation) =

Loch Ard is a loch in Scotland.

Loch Ard may also refer to:

- Loch Ard (ship), 19th century clipper ship
- Loch Ard Gorge, Port Campbell National Park, Victoria, Australia
