= Princetown, Victoria =

Princetown
- Town
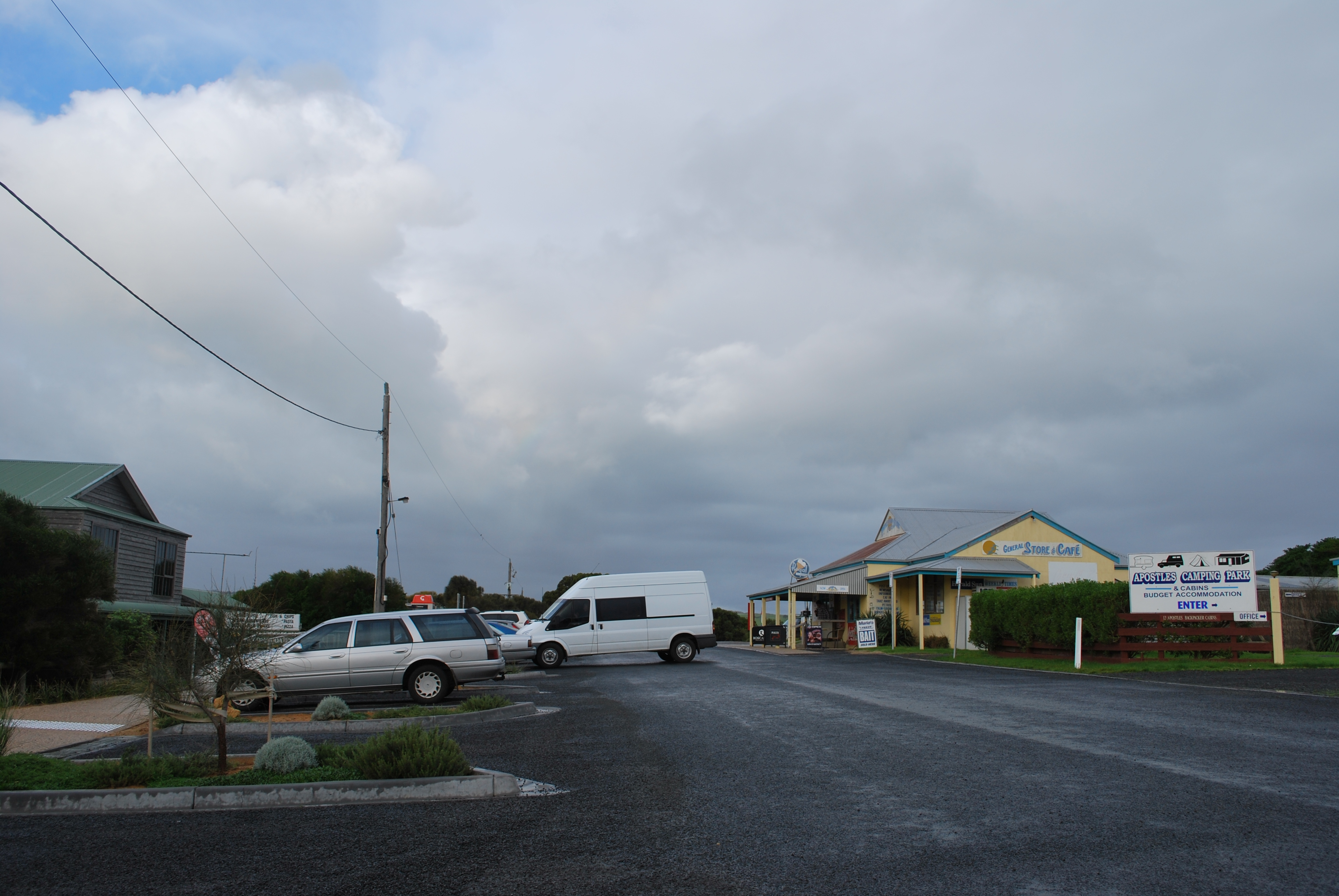
- Main street in Princetown

- Coordinates: 38°40′0″S 143°09′0″E
- Country: Australia
- State: Victoria
- LGA: Corangamite Shire
- Location: 210 km (130 mi) SW of Melbourne; 81 km (50 mi) E of Warrnambool

Government
  - State electorate: Polwarth
  - Federal division: Wannon

Population
  - Total: 236 (2021 census)
- Postcode: 3269
- Mean max temp: 20 °C (68 °F)
- Mean min temp: 7.5 °C (45.5 °F)
- Annual rainfall: 80.9 mm (3.19 in)

Princetown is a town in Victoria, Australia, located on the Great Ocean Road, east of the Twelve Apostles, in the Corangamite Shire.

== History ==
As early as the 1840s, pastoral leases had been issued, with Charles Brown taking up the 'Moonlight Head' run, the land encompassing the present-day township. The lease then went to James Murray from the adjacent 'Port Campbell' run, and once both were leased, then became known as 'Glenample'. Hugh Gibson and Peter McArthur then bought the run in 1866.

The township was surveyed in 1867, and was named after Prince Albert, who had been visiting Victoria at the time. The original allotments, sold in 1868, were situated on Old Coach Road, and have since become part of the Great Otway National Park. The blocks in the present township were first sold in 1885. By this time a cheese factory and school had been in operation.

Prior to the construction of a bridge over the Gellibrand River in 1893, an infrequent ferry was operated between the township side and the other side of the river, where the Rivernook guesthouse was situated, as well as the Recreation Reserve.

== General ==
Princetown is located 14 kilometres (8.7 mi) east of Port Campbell in Victoria, Australia on the Great Ocean Road. It hosts a pub which doubles as a general store, a post office and some accommodation options. The hamlet provides access to beaches and the mouth of the Gellibrand River. At the 2006 census, Princetown district had a population of 459. Redrawing of the census lines reduced the figure in 2016 to 241 persons. Princetown Cricket Club is the sole surviving sporting club in the township, boasting about 30 members playing in the local South West Cricket Association. The current club was formed in 1968, but cricket had been played in Princetown as far back as 1886.

== Attractions ==
A river estuary and wetlands is adjacent to the township, with reed beds on the western branch of the estuary containing significant bird and plant life. Princetown is bounded on two sides by national parks, with the Port Campbell National Park extending north-westerly and the Great Otway National Park to the south-east.

The Twelve Apostles rock formations are six kilometres to the west of Princetown, with the Gibson Steps also nearby. The Loch Ard Gorge is just past the Twelve Apostles, towards Port Campbell. In the other direction is Maits Rest Rainforest Walk.

A 39 acre fauna park, the Great Ocean Road Wildlife Park is located nearby in the locality of Gellibrand Lower and is a popular local tourist attraction for seeing local native animals.
