= London Bridge (Victoria) =

Natural arch in Victoria, Australia

Coordinates: 38°37′19″S 142°55′57″E

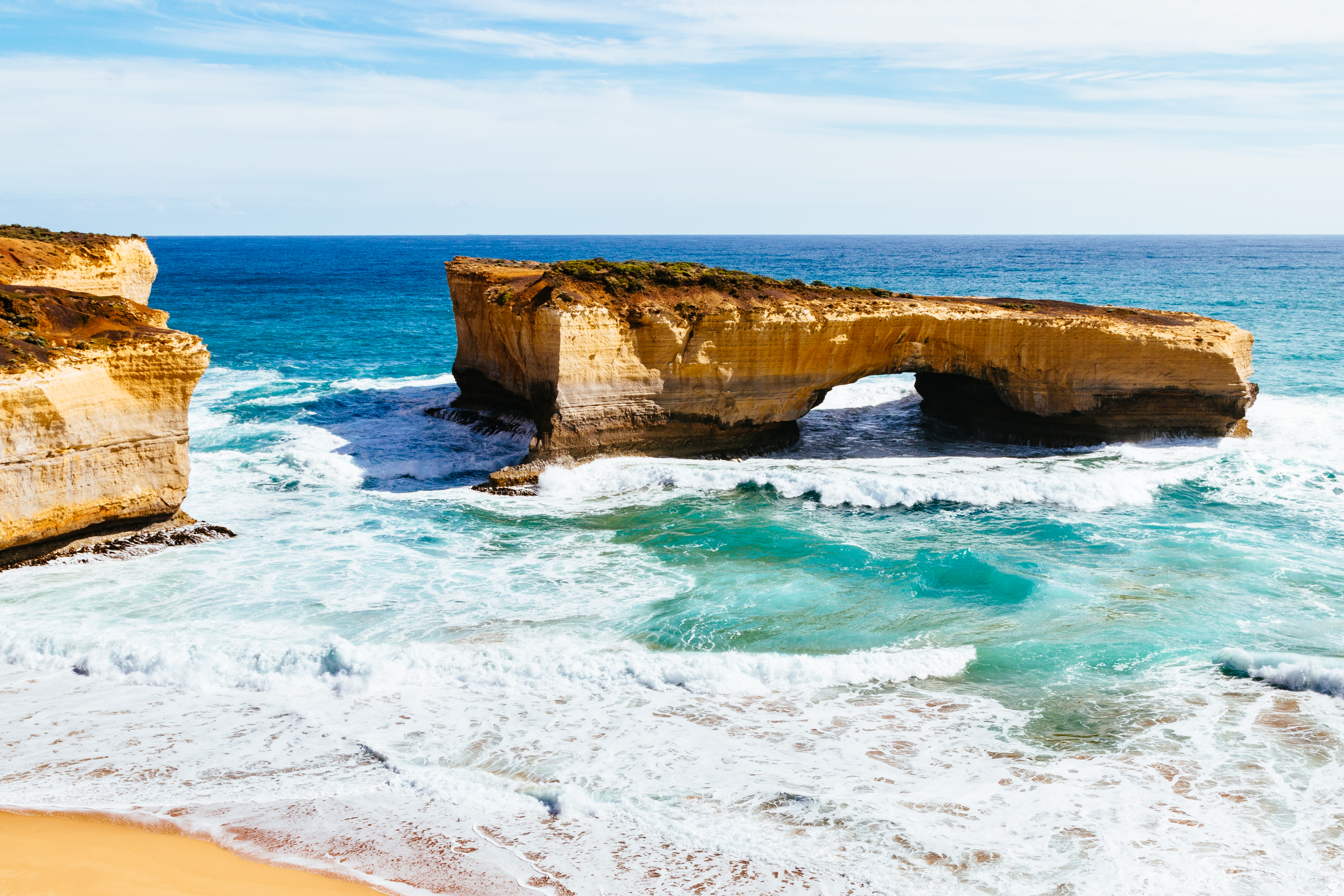
London Bridge in 2014

London Bridge is an offshore natural arch in the Port Campbell National Park, Australia. The arch is a significant tourist attraction along the Great Ocean Road near Port Campbell in Victoria. The stack was formed by a gradual process of erosion, and until 1990 formed a complete double-span natural bridge.

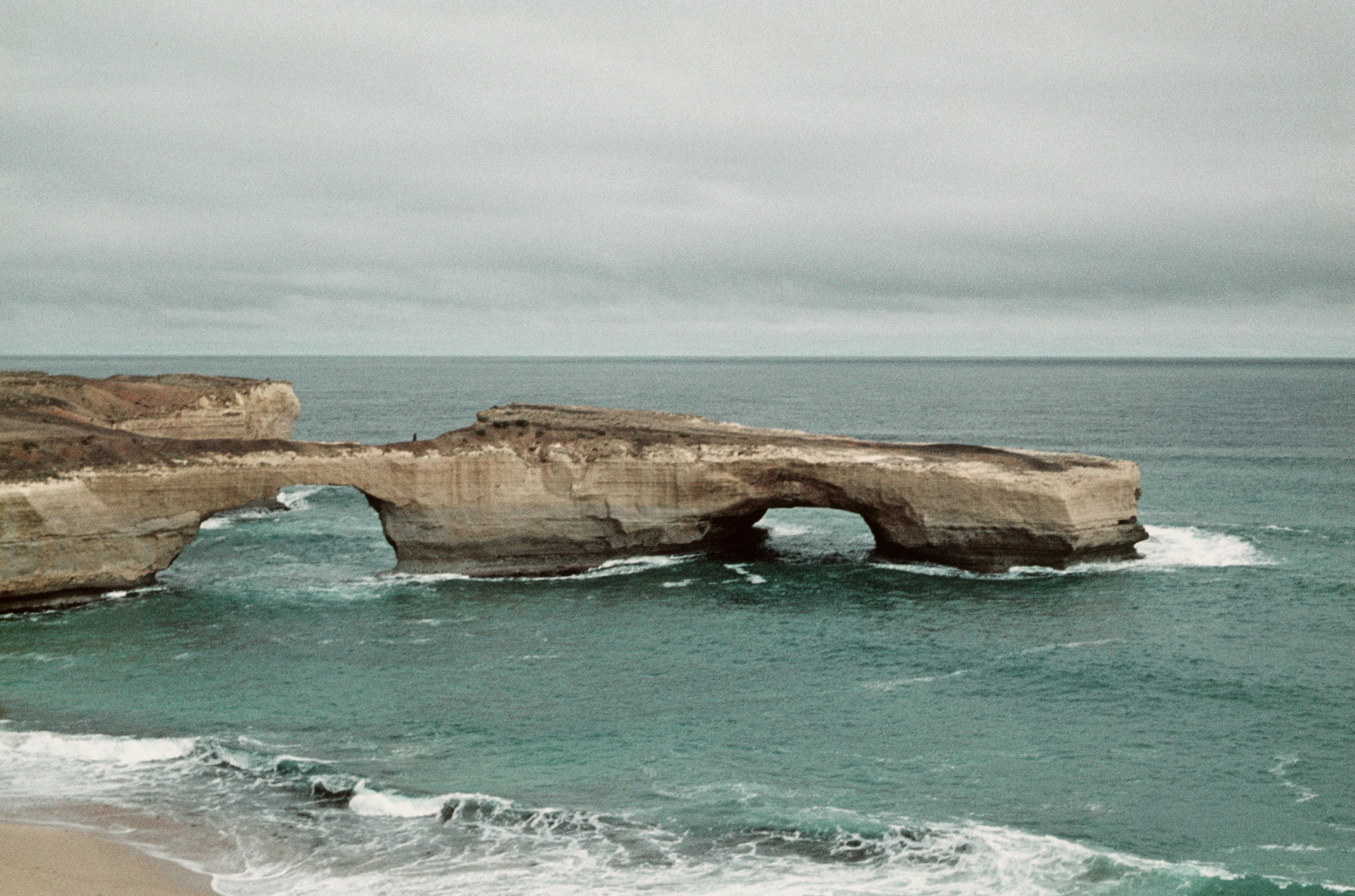
The formation in 1961, prior to its collapse in 1990

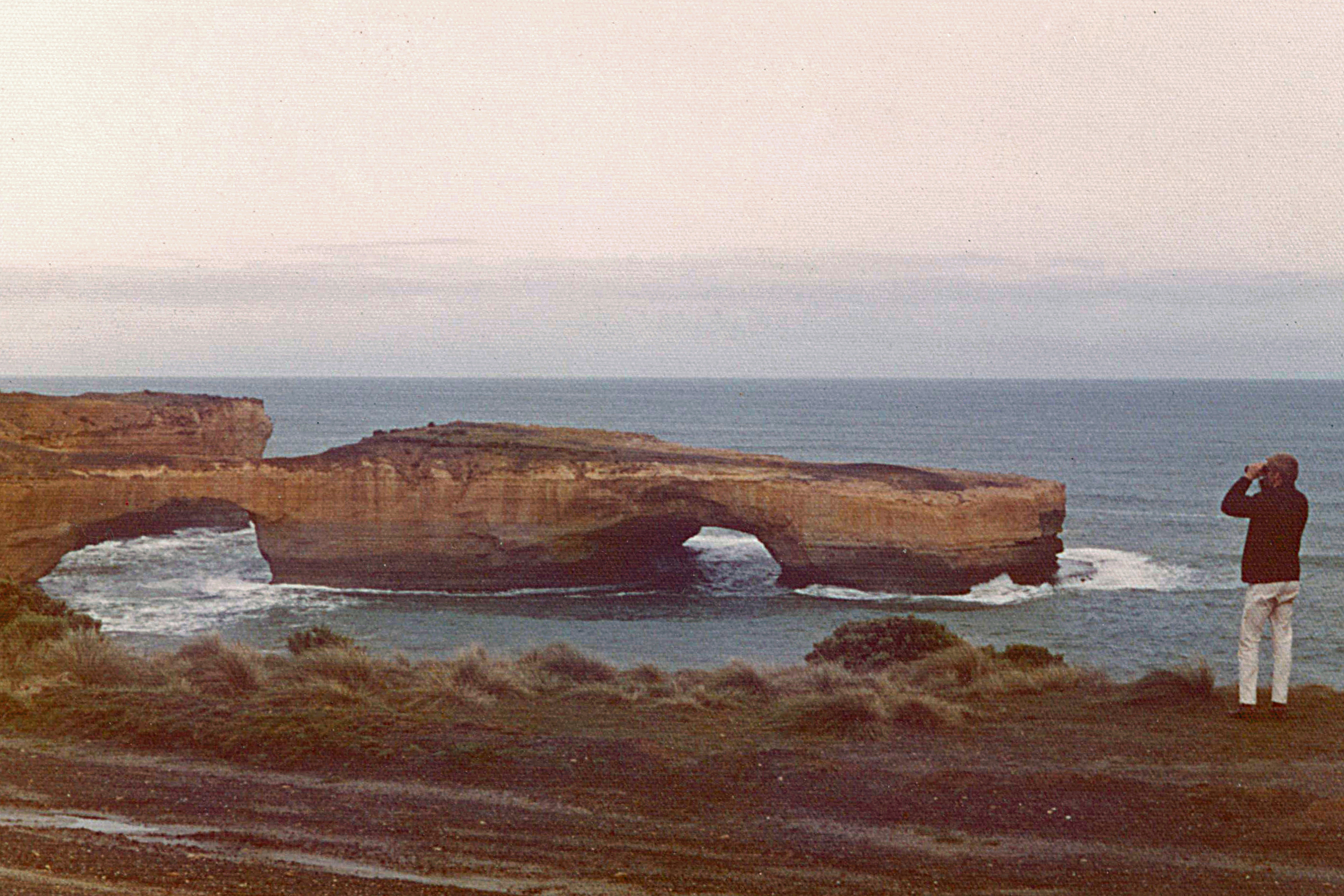
The Bridge in 1973

The span closer to the shoreline collapsed unexpectedly on the evening of 15 January 1990, sparking comparisons with the rhyme "London Bridge Is Falling Down" and leaving two tourists stranded on the outer span. They were rescued by police helicopter, and no one was injured in the event.

== See also ==
- The Twelve Apostles, Victoria
- Loch Ard Gorge
- The Gibson Steps
- The Grotto
