= Gibson Steps =

Area of cliffs in Victoria, Australia

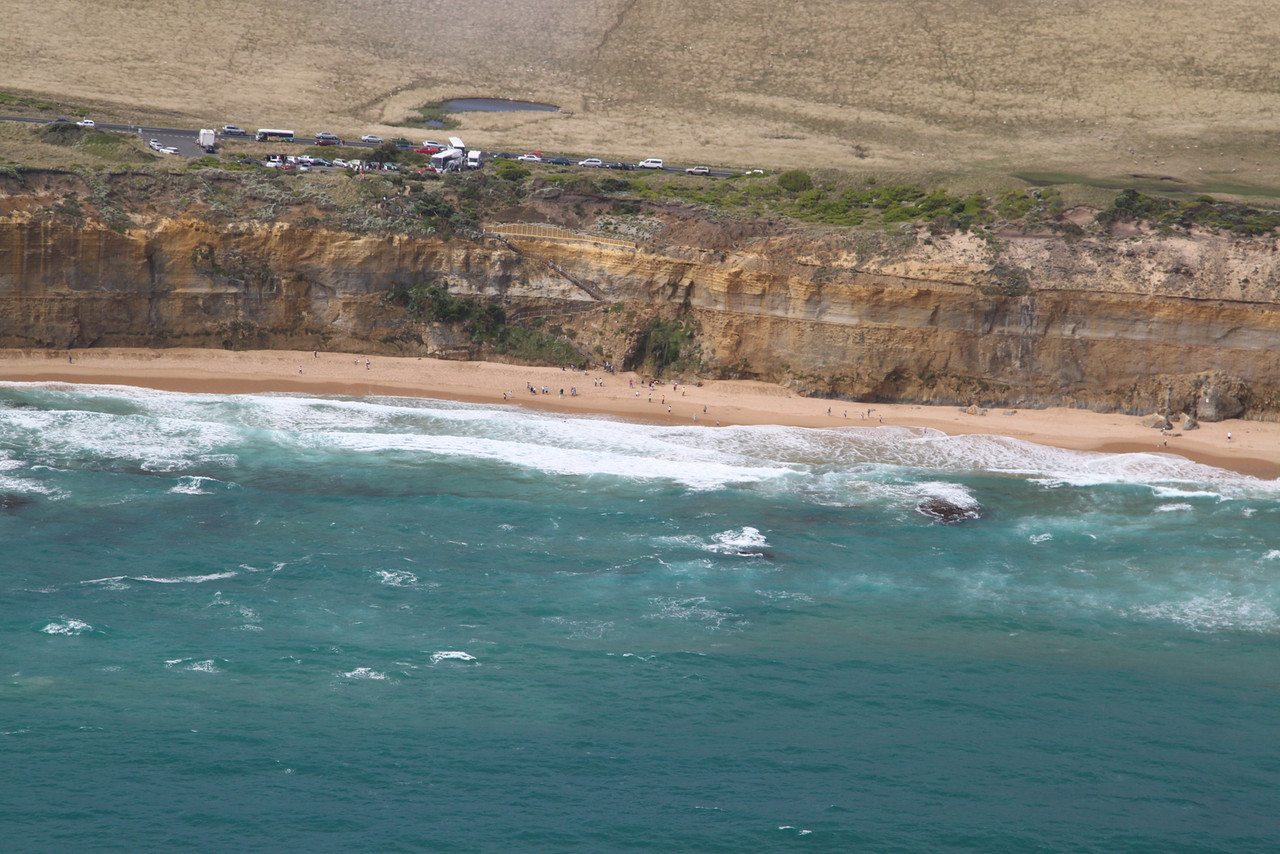
The Gibson Steps, from the air, looking northeast

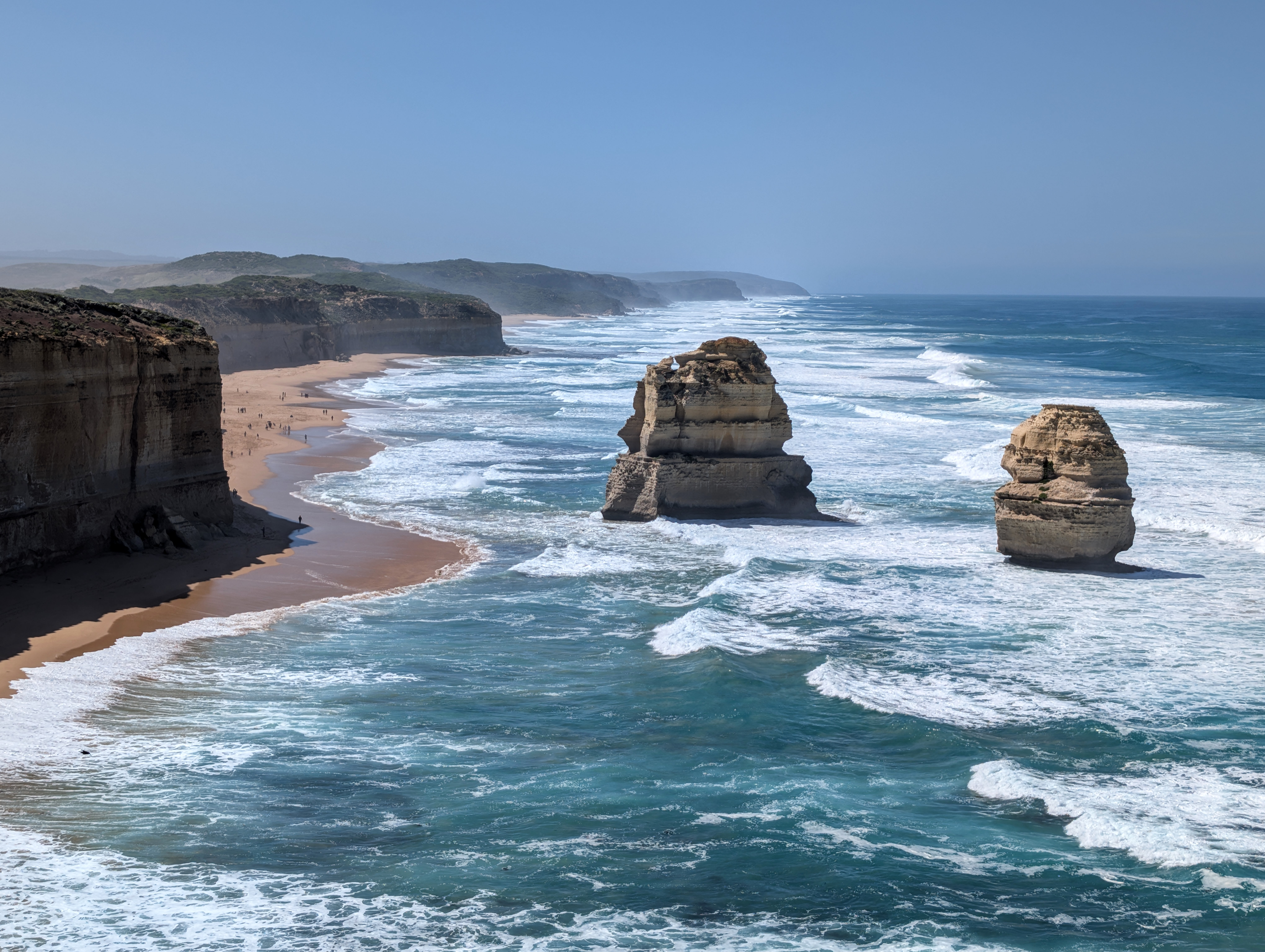
Gibson Beach from Saddle Lookout

The Gibson Steps are an area of cliffs on the south coast of Australia, located at 38°40′06″S 143°06′43″E. The cliffs are the first sightseeing stopoff in Port Campbell National Park for travellers heading West along the Great Ocean Road, located about 2 minutes drive from The Twelve Apostles. The name Gibson Steps refers to the staircase leading down to Gibson Beach.

== See also ==
- Clifton Beach
- The Twelve Apostles, Victoria
- London Bridge
- Loch Ard Gorge
- The Grotto
