= Grey River (Victoria) =

Perennial river in Victoria, Australia

Grey
- Location of the Grey River mouth in Victoria

Location
- Country: Australia
- State: Victoria
- Region: South East Coastal Plain (IBRA), The Otways
- Local government area: Colac Otway Shire

Physical characteristics
- Source: Otway Ranges
  - location: below Muddy Saddle
  - coordinates: 38°37′54″S 143°47′18″E
  - elevation: 491 m (1,611 ft)
- Mouth: Addis Bay, Bass Strait
  - location: Grey River (town)
  - coordinates: 38°40′58″S 143°50′27″E
  - elevation: 0 m (0 ft)
- Length: 9 km (5.6 mi)

Basin features
- River system: Corangamite catchment
- National park: Great Otway National Park

The Grey River is a perennial river of the Corangamite catchment, in the Otways region of the Australian state of Victoria.

== Location and features ==
The Grey River rises in the Otway Ranges in southwest Victoria and flows generally east by south towards the town of Grey River where the river reaches its mouth and empties into Addis Bay, part of Bass Strait, north of Cape Otway. From its highest point, the river descends 491 metres (1,611 ft) over its 9-kilometre (5.6 mi) course.

== See also ==
- List of rivers of Australia § Victoria
