= Great Ocean Road =

Road in Victoria, Australia

Coordinates: 38°44′01.77″S 143°41′14.17″E

Great Ocean Road Victoria
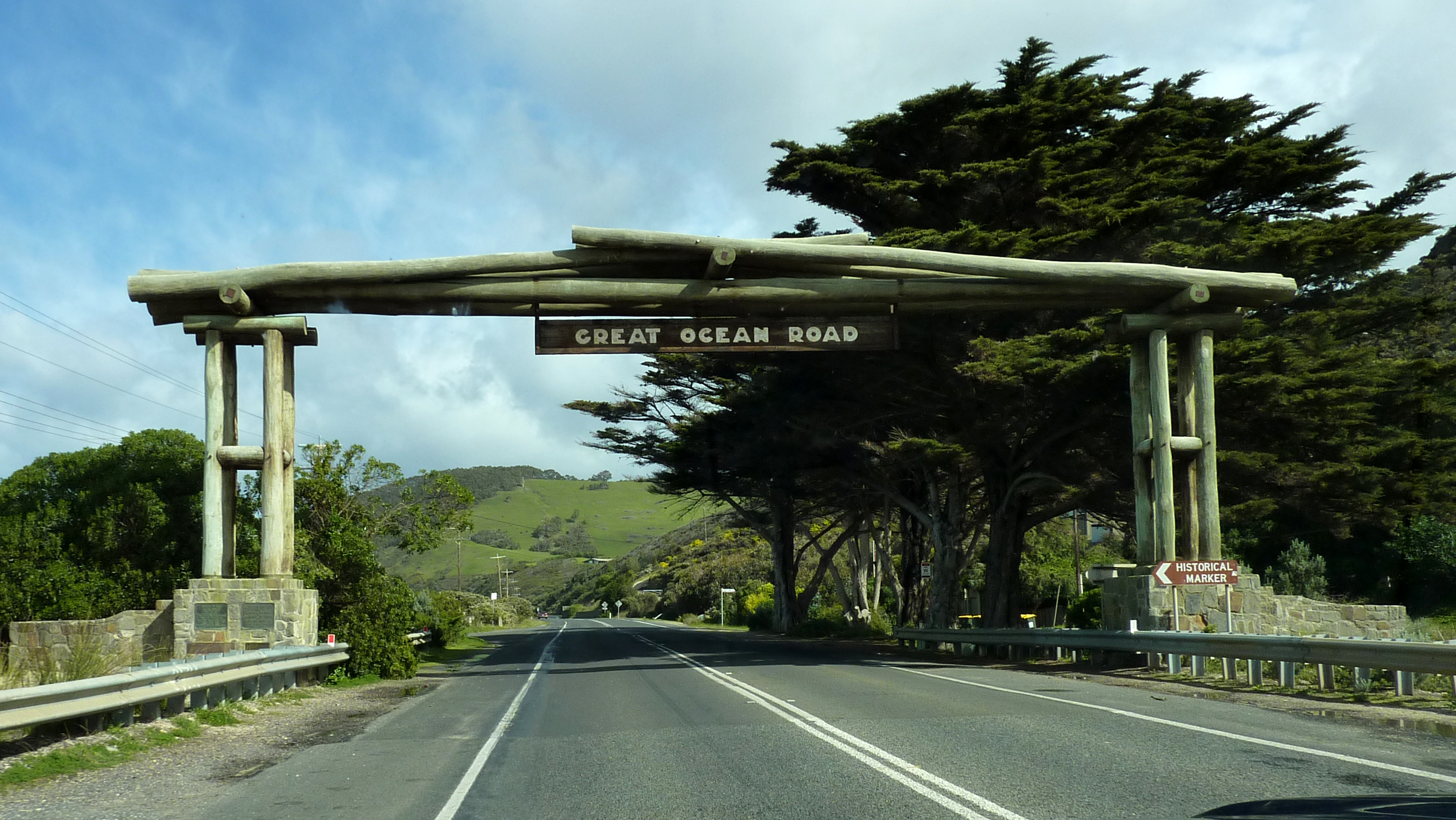
- Great Ocean Road memorial arch at Eastern View, 2009
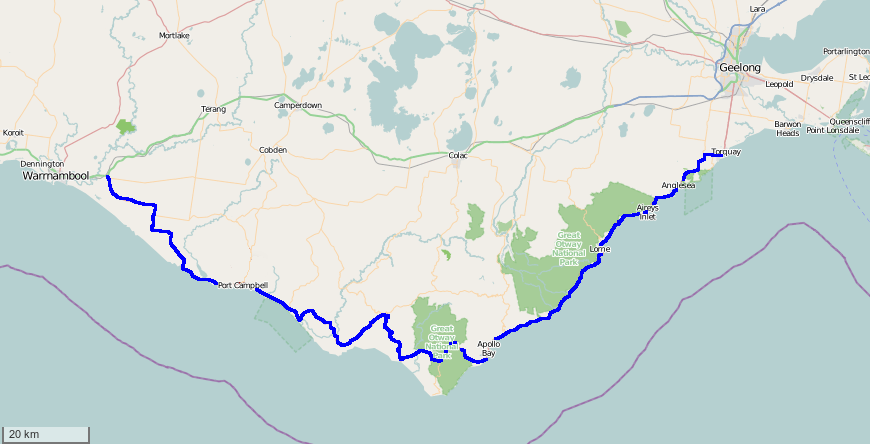

General information
- Type: Highway
- Length: 240 km (149 mi)
- Opened: 26 November 1932; 93 years ago
- Route number(s): B100 (1996–present)
- Former route number: State Route 100 (1986–1996)
- Tourist routes: Tourist Drive 21 (Eastern View–Torquay)

Major junctions
- East end: Surf Coast Highway; Torquay, Victoria
- Bells Boulevarde; Anglesea Road; Otway Lighthouse Road; Princetown Road
- West end: Princes Highway; Allansford, Victoria

Location(s)
- Major settlements: Anglesea, Aireys Inlet, Lorne, Wye River, Kennett River, Apollo Bay, Lavers Hill, Port Campbell, Peterborough

Highway system
- Highways in Australia; National Highway • Freeways in Australia; Highways in Victoria

Torquay Surf Beach, adjacent to the starting point of the Great Ocean Road

Aerial views of the Great Ocean Road and nearby coastline, 2021

The Great Ocean Road is an Australian National Heritage-listed 240-kilometre (150 mi) stretch of road along the south-eastern coast of Australia, between the Victorian towns of Torquay and Allansford. Built by returned soldiers between 1919 and 1932, and dedicated to soldiers killed during World War I, the road is the world's largest war memorial. Winding through varying terrain along the Western District coast, and providing access to several prominent landmarks, including the Twelve Apostles limestone stack formations, the road is an important tourist attraction.

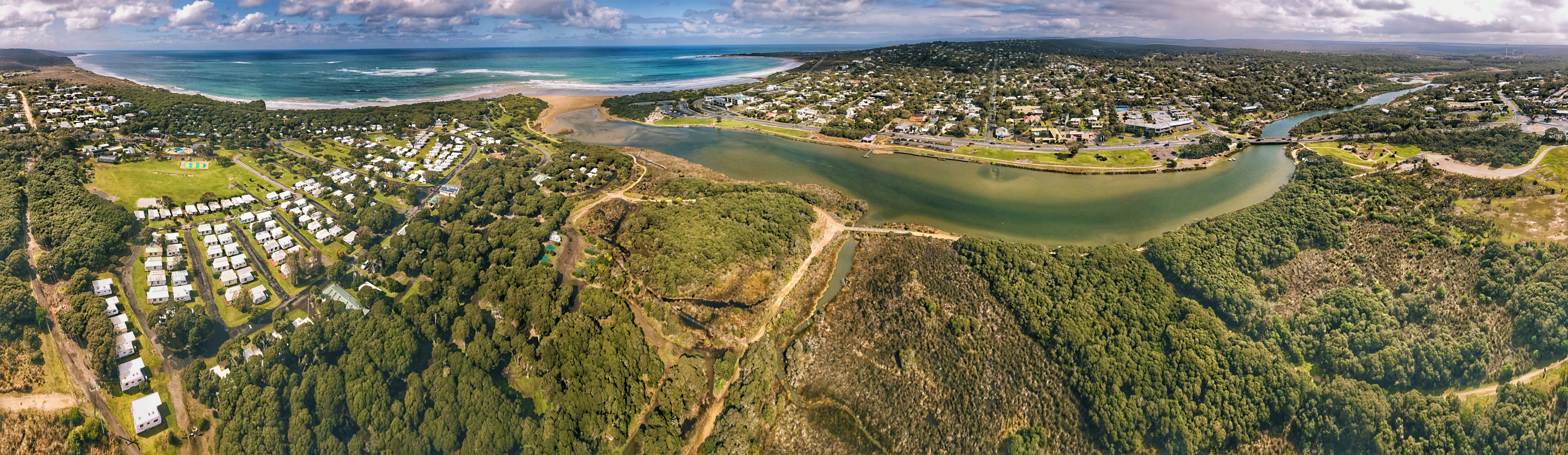
Aerial panorama of Anglesea, 2018

The city of Geelong, close to Torquay, experiences great benefit from Australian and international visitors to the road, with Geelong Otway Tourism affirming it as an invaluable asset. In 2008, the Royal Automobile Club of Victoria (RACV) listed the road as the state's top tourism experience in its Victoria 101 survey, based on places that members of the public would recommend to visitors.

== Route ==
The Great Ocean Road starts at Torquay and runs westward to finish at Allansford, near Warrnambool. The road is two lanes (one in each direction), and has a speed limit which varies between 50 km/h and 100 km/h.

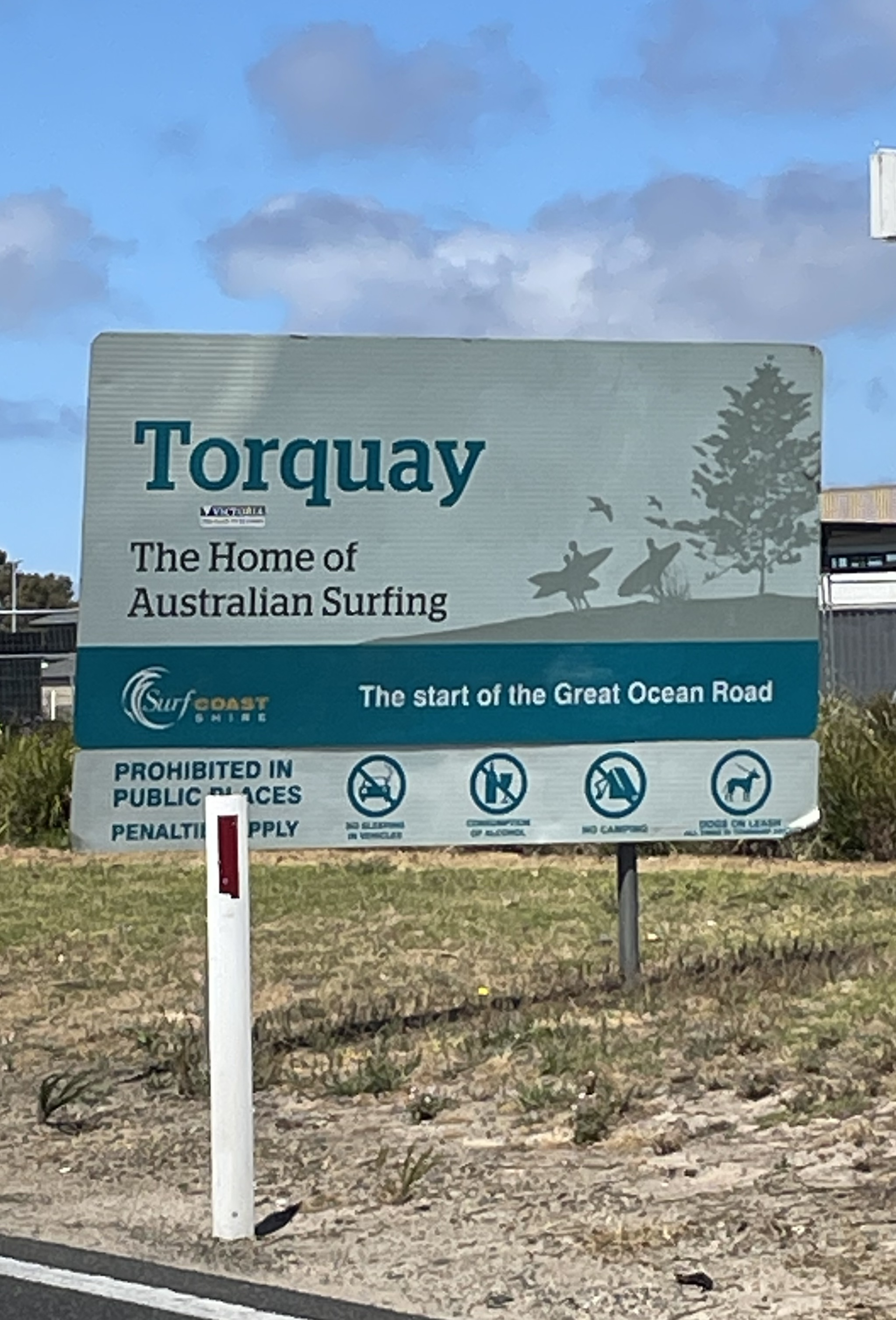
Road sign entering Torquay from Geelong: "The start of the Great Ocean Road"

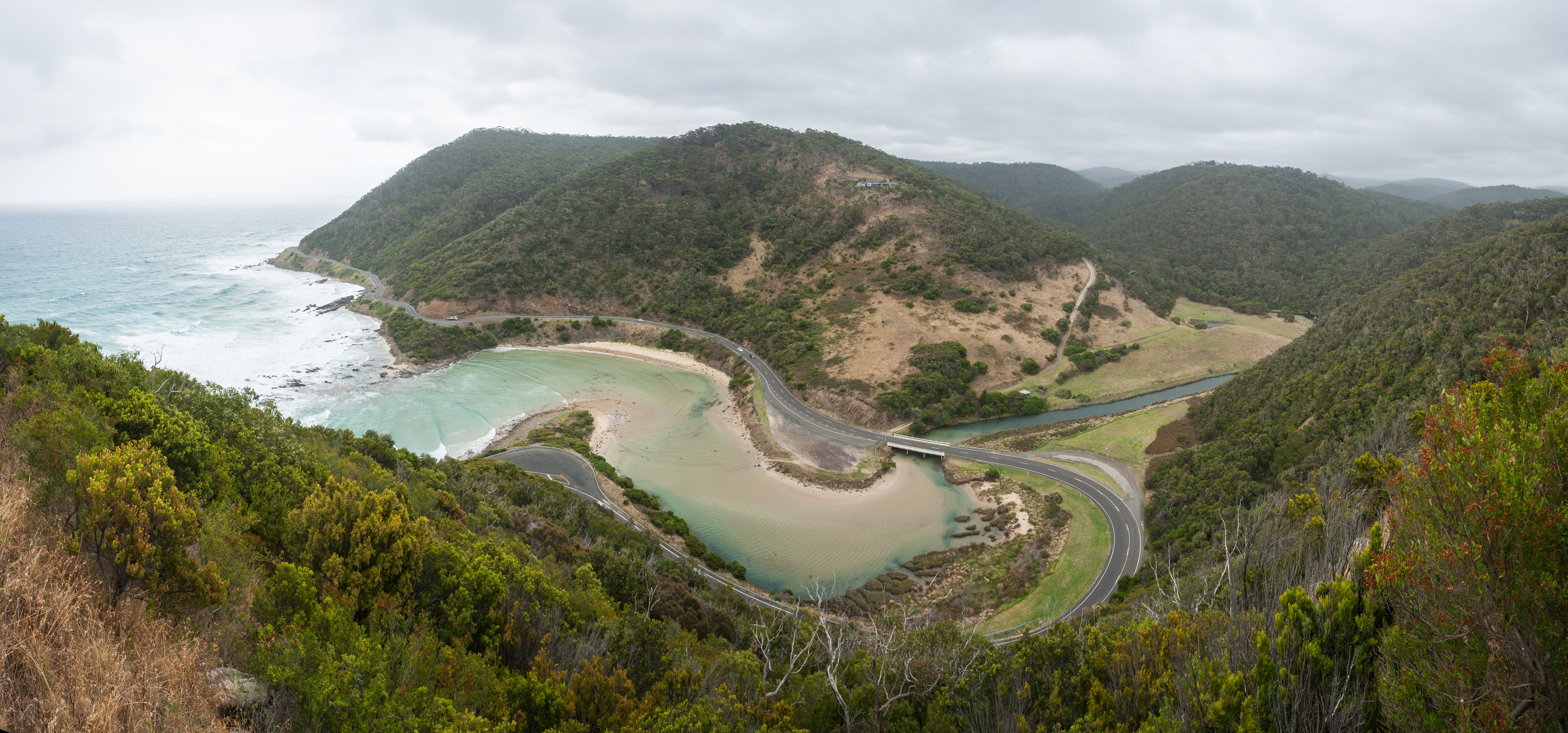
Great Ocean Road as viewed from Teddy's Lookout, south of Lorne, 2012

A prime tourist attraction, much of the road hugs the coastline along what is known, east of the Otway Ranges, as the Surf Coast and, west of Cape Otway, as the Shipwreck Coast. It provides extensive views over Bass Strait and the Southern Ocean.

The road runs through rainforests, as well as alongside beaches and cliffs composed of limestone and sandstone, which are susceptible to erosion. The road travels via Anglesea, Lorne, Apollo Bay, and Port Campbell, the latter being notable for its natural limestone and sandstone rock formations, including Loch Ard Gorge, The Grotto, London Bridge and The Twelve Apostles. The stretch of the Great Ocean Road nearer to Torquay closely follows the coast, with some sheer cliffs on the seaward side. Road signs warn motorists of possible rockfalls.

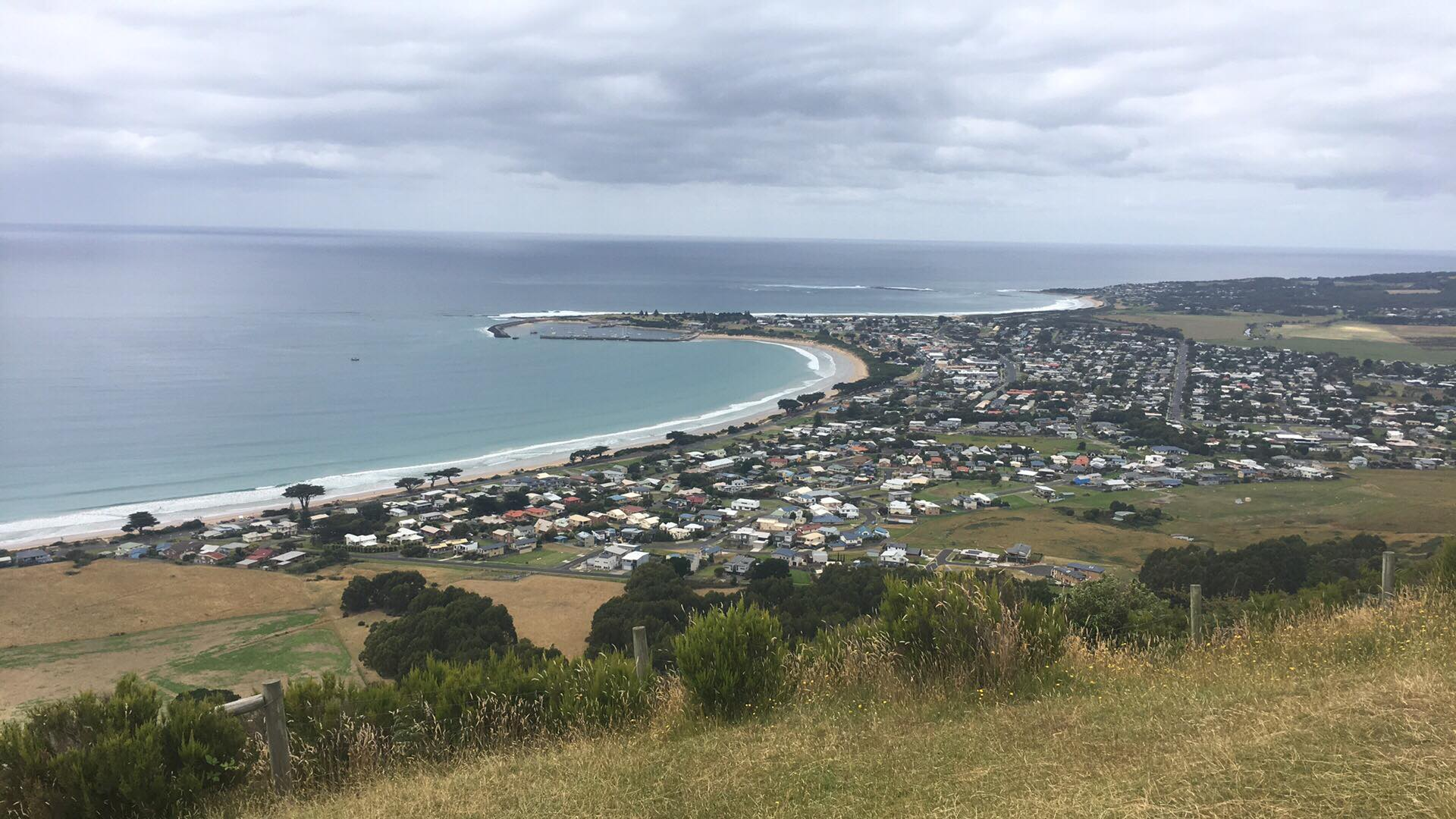
Apollo Bay, 2019

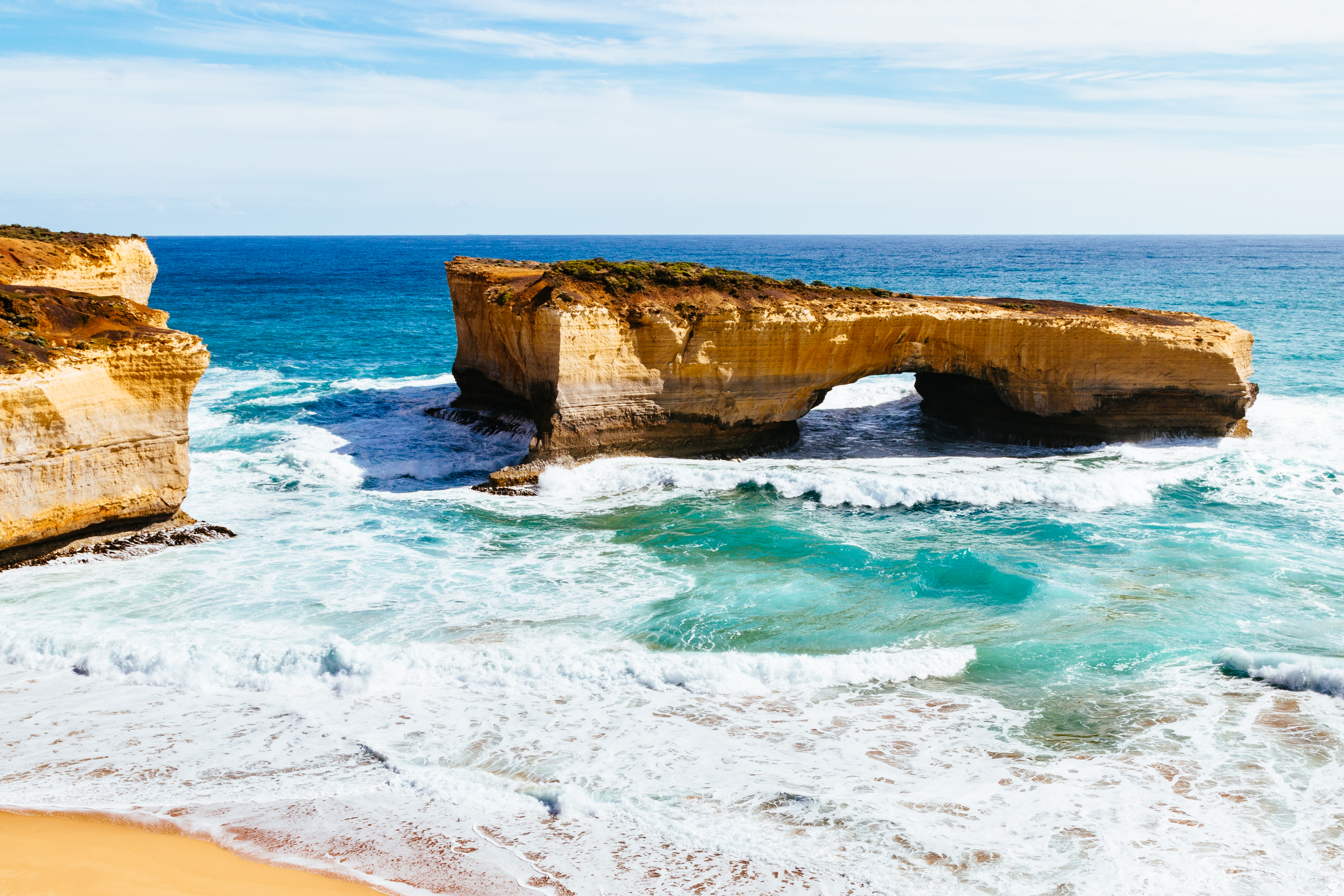
London Bridge, 2014

== History ==
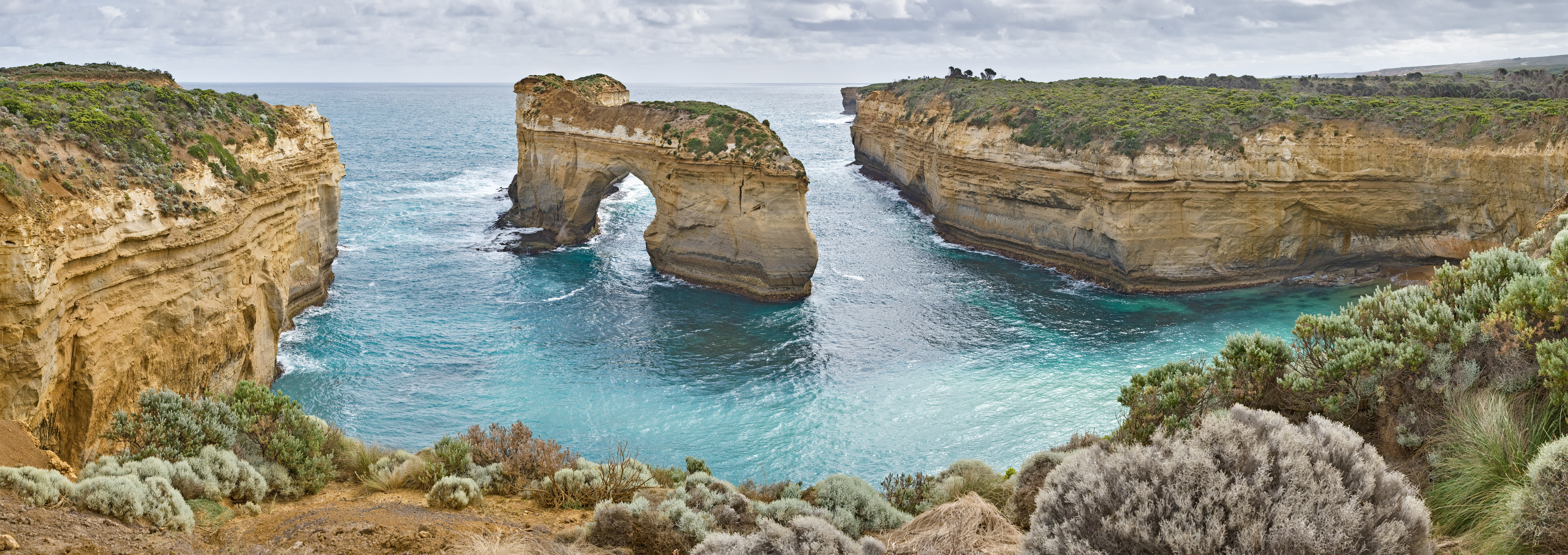
The former Island Archway off Loch Ard Gorge, shortly before it collapsed in 2009.

The Great Ocean Road was first planned towards the end of World War I, when Chairman of the Country Roads Board, William Calder, asked the State War Council for funds to be provided for returned soldiers to work on roads in sparsely populated areas in the Western District. At the time, the rugged south-west coast of Victoria was accessible only by sea or rough bush track. It was envisaged that the road would connect isolated settlements on the coast and become a vital transport link for the timber industry and tourism.

Surveying of the road, tentatively titled the South Coast Road, started in 1918. It was suggested that it run from Barwon Heads in the east, follow the coast west around Cape Otway, and end near Warrnambool. In 1918, the Great Ocean Road Trust was formed as a private company, under the helm of president Howard Hitchcock. The company managed to secure £81,000 in capital from private subscriptions and borrowing, with Hitchcock himself contributing £3000. The money was to be repaid by charging drivers a toll until the debt was cleared, and the road would then be gifted to the state.

=== Construction ===
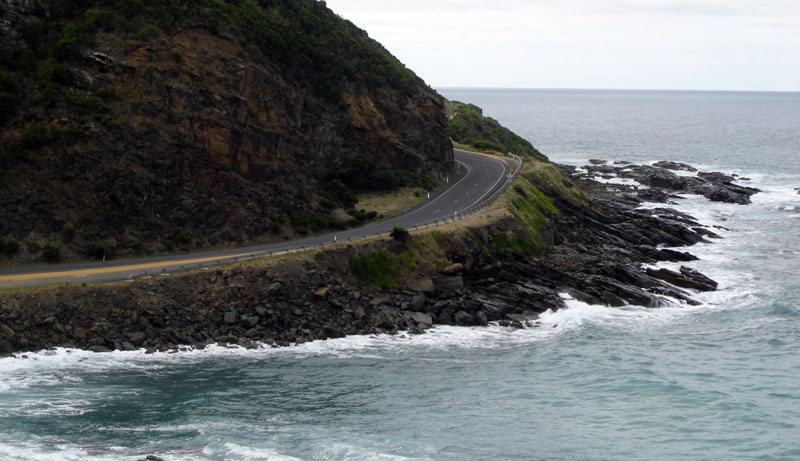
Great Ocean Road, 2005

Construction began on 19 September 1919. Approximately 3,000 returned servicemen worked on the project, which was a war memorial for servicemen killed in World War I. The advance survey team progressed through dense scrub at a rate of approximately three kilometres a month. Construction was mostly by hand, using explosives, pick and shovel, wheelbarrows, and some small machinery, and was at times perilous, with several workers being killed. The final sections, along steep coastal cliffs, were the most difficult to work on. Anecdotal evidence from ABC archives in 1982 suggested workers would rest detonators on their knees during travel, because it gave the explosives the softest ride.

Workers were paid 10 shillings and sixpence for an eight-hour day, also working a half-day on Saturdays. They were accommodated in tents, and were provided with meals in a communal dining marquee. Food cost up to 10 shillings a week. Despite the isolation of the camps, the workers had access to a piano, gramophone, games, newspapers and magazines.

In 1924, the coastal steamer Casino became stranded near Cape Patton, after having hit a reef at Point Hawdon, near the Grey River. Legend has it that 500 barrels of beer and 120 cases of spirits were jettisoned and that road workers salvaged them, resulting in an unscheduled two-week-long drinking break. However, Museums Victoria notes only that most of the cargo, largely composed of Christmas goods, was dumped into the sea. The Age reported that, "The Great Ocean-road [sic] proved a boon to the passengers, who were enabled without much inconvenience to reach Wood's farm house, Apollo Bay. However, if the road were finished, the vessel's cargo could be safely conveyed to either Apollo Bay, the Wye River, or Lorne."

=== Completion and early use ===
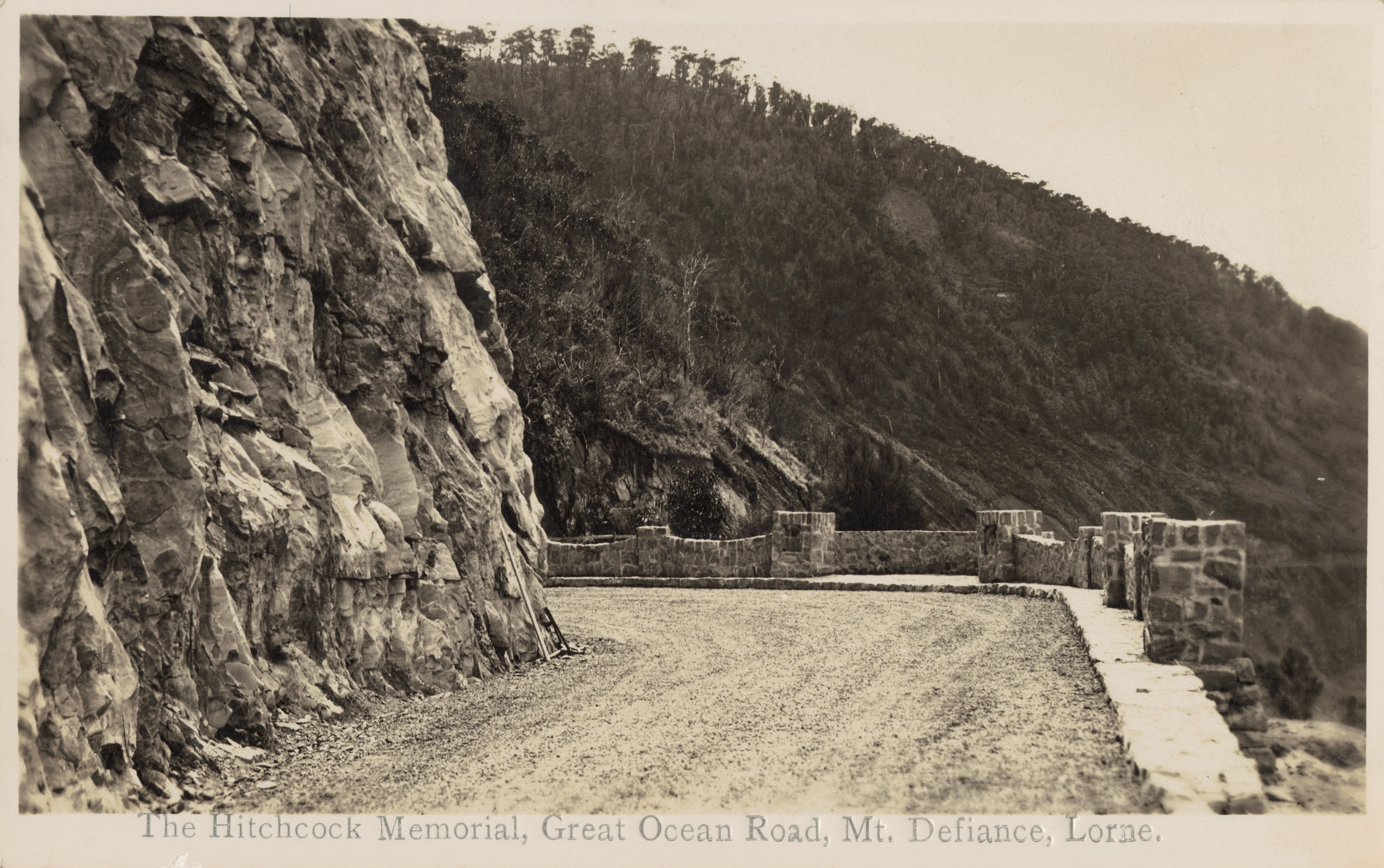
The Hitchcock Memorial at Mount Defiance, c.1930

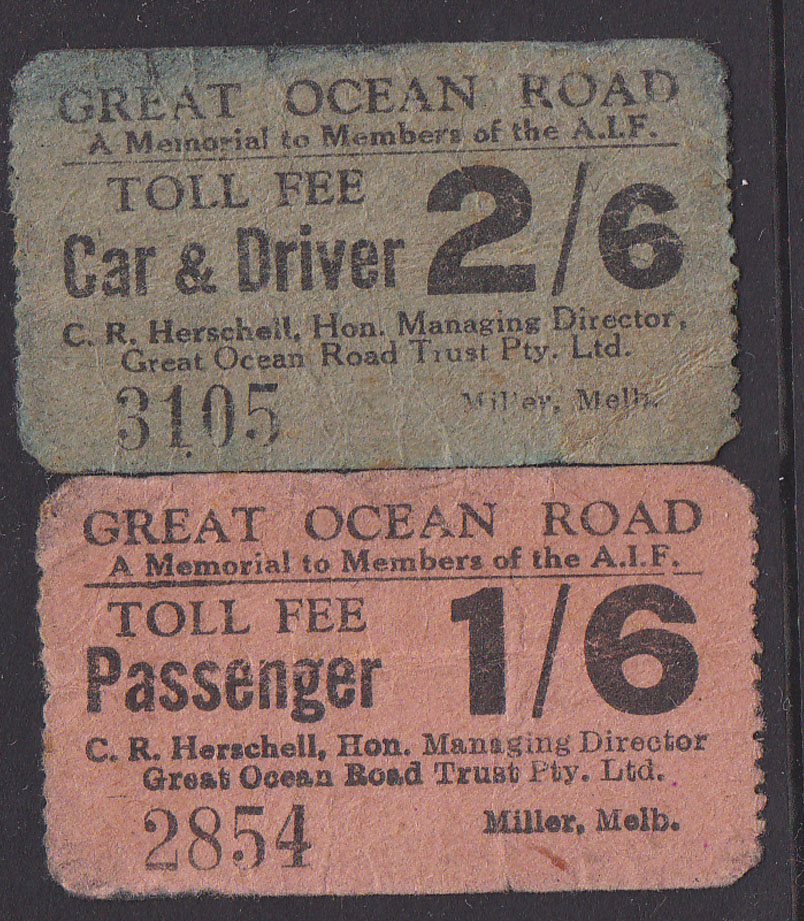
Tickets for the toll fee, c. 1930

On 18 March 1922, the section from Eastern View to Lorne was officially opened, with celebrations. However, it was then closed from 10 May 1922 for further work, opening again on 21 December, along with tolls to help recoup construction costs. The charge, payable at the Eastern View toll gate, was two shillings for motor cars, and 10 shillings for wagons with more than two horses.

In November 1932, the section from Lorne to Apollo Bay was finished, bringing the road to completion. It was officially opened by Victoria's Lieutenant-Governor Sir William Irvine, during a ceremony near the Grand Pacific Hotel at Lorne, and the road has subsequently been acknowledged as the world's largest war memorial. At the time, The Age commented, "In the face of almost insurmountable odds, the Great Ocean Road has materialised from a dream or 'wild-cat scheme', as many dubbed it, into concrete reality". Although Hitchcock had died of heart disease on 22 August 1932, before the road was completed, his car was driven behind the governor's in the procession along the road during the opening ceremony. A memorial in his name was constructed on the road at Mount Defiance, near Lorne, and he is generally considered to be the Father of the Road.

In the face of almost insurmountable odds, the Great Ocean Road has materialised from a dream or 'wild-cat scheme', as many dubbed it, into concrete reality

— Rood, David (10 April 2007). "Road's still great, 75 years on". The Age.

In its original state, the road was considered a formidable drive, comfortably accommodating only a single vehicle at a time. Areas with sheer cliffs were the most hazardous, with only few places where drivers could pull over to allow others to proceed in the opposite direction. For £5, any "public-spirited citizen" could request that a crossover be cut into the road. On 2 October 1936, the road was handed to the State Government, with the deed for the road being presented to the Victorian Premier at a ceremony at the Cathedral Rock toll gate. Tolls were removed at that time.

In 1939, following the death of the chairman of the Country Roads Board, W.T.B. McCormick, who was also honorary engineer for the Great Ocean Road Trust, it was decided to build a memorial arch in his honour, across the road at Eastern View. The arch was opened 4 November 1939, and was built of timber logs on a stone base, with a tablet memorial to Mr McCormick on one side, and another to the returned servicemen on the other. The arch was rebuilt in 1973 when the road was widened, and again in 1983, after being destroyed in the Ash Wednesday bushfires. It had to be rebuilt yet again after it collapsed during a storm in 1990.

In 1962, the Tourist Development Authority deemed the road to be "one of the world's great scenic roads". Despite improvements, the road was still considered a challenging drive, and the Victorian Police motor school was using it for training around 1966.

Over its life, the Great Ocean Road has been susceptible to natural elements. In 1960, the section at Princetown was partially washed away by water during storms. There were landslides on 11 August 1964, and 1971, both closing sections of the road near Lorne. Because of the terrain surrounding the road, it was also closed due to bushfires in 1962 and 1964, particularly in areas with nearby campsites. In January 2011, a section of a cutting collapsed due to heavy rain.

In 2011, the road was added to the Australian National Heritage List.

=== Road classification ===
Great Ocean Road was signed as State Route 100 between Torquay and Allansford in 1986. With Victoria's conversion to the newer alphanumeric system in the late 1990s, this was updated to route B100 in 1996.The passing of the Road Management Act 2004 granted the responsibility of overall management and development of Victoria's major arterial roads to VicRoads: in 2004, VicRoads re-declared the road as Great Ocean Road (Arterial #4890), beginning at Surf Coast Highway at Torquay and ending at Princes Highway in Allansford.

=== Great Ocean Walk ===
In 2004, the Great Ocean Walk opened, connecting 104 km of walking trails that follow the coastline near the Great Ocean Road, stretching from Apollo Bay to the 12 Apostles.

== Engineering heritage award ==
The road received an Engineering Heritage National Marker from Engineers Australia as part of its Engineering Heritage Recognition Program.

== Great Ocean Road Protection Act ==
In December 2020, the Great Ocean Road and Environs Protection Act 2020 went into effect, giving legal protection to the Great Ocean Road.

== Events ==
=== Great Ocean Road Marathon ===
A 45-kilometre section of the Great Ocean Road, between Lorne and Apollo Bay, is the location of the annual "Great Ocean Road Marathon". First run in 2005, the marathon is part of the Great Ocean Road Running Festival. The course record of 2:27:37 was set in 2019 by English runner Nick Earl. Earl broke the previous record of 2:27:42 set in 2011 by James Kipkelwon of Kenya, who also won the event in 2012.

=== Cycling ===
In July 2015, former World Road Cycling Champion and Tour de France winner Cadel Evans announced that the Great Ocean Road would play host to the Cadel Evans Great Ocean Road Race in early 2015, including elite races for men and women and a mass participation People's Ride. As of 2019, the People's Ride includes three distance options—35 km, 65 km, or 115 km.Wiggle Amy's Gran Fondo cycling event is held in September and uses the section between Lorne and Skenes Creek. One of the only cycling events in Australia held on a fully closed road, it is named for Amy Gillett, who was killed in a collision between the Australian women's cycling squad and a driver in Germany in 2005.

== Major intersections ==
| LGA | Location | km | mi | Destinations | Notes |
|---|---|---|---|---|---|
| Surf Coast | Torquay | 0 | 0.0 | Surf Coast Highway (B100/Tourist Drive 21) – Geelong | |
| Surf Coast | Jan Juc | 2.8 | 1.7 | Bells Boulevarde (C132) – Bells Beach | |
| Surf Coast | Bellbrae | 4.9 | 3.0 | Anglesea Road (C134) – Melbourne via Geelong Ring Road (M1) | |
| Surf Coast | Lorne | 44.7 | 27.8 | Deans Marsh–Lorne Road (C151) – Deans Marsh, Winchelsea | |
| Colac Otway | Skenes Creek | 84.6 | 52.6 | Skenes Creek Road (C119) – Birregurra, Colac, Ballarat | |
| Colac Otway | Cape Otway | 110.5 | 68.7 | Otway Lighthouse Road (C157) – Cape Otway | |
| Colac Otway | Lavers Hill | 137.5 | 85.4 | Colac–Lavers Hill Road (C155) – Colac, Ballarat | |
| Corangamite | Princetown | 172.9 | 107.4 | Princetown Road (C166) – Princetown | |
| Corangamite | Port Campbell | 187.2 | 116.3 | Cobden–Port Campbell Road (C164) – Cobden, Camperdown, Beaufort, Ballarat | |
| Moyne | Nullawarre | 222.6 | 138.3 | Timboon–Nullawarre Road (C163) – Timboon | |
| Moyne | Allansford | 239.3 | 148.7 | Cobden–Warrnambool Road (C167) – Cobden | |
| Moyne | Allansford | 240 | 150 | Princes Highway (A1) – Warrnambool, Colac | |
1.000 mi = 1.609 km; 1.000 km = 0.621 mi: Route transition

== See also ==
- List of highways in Victoria
