= Loch Ard Gorge =

Gorge in Victoria, Australia

Coordinates: 38°38′47.7″S 143°04′13.8″E

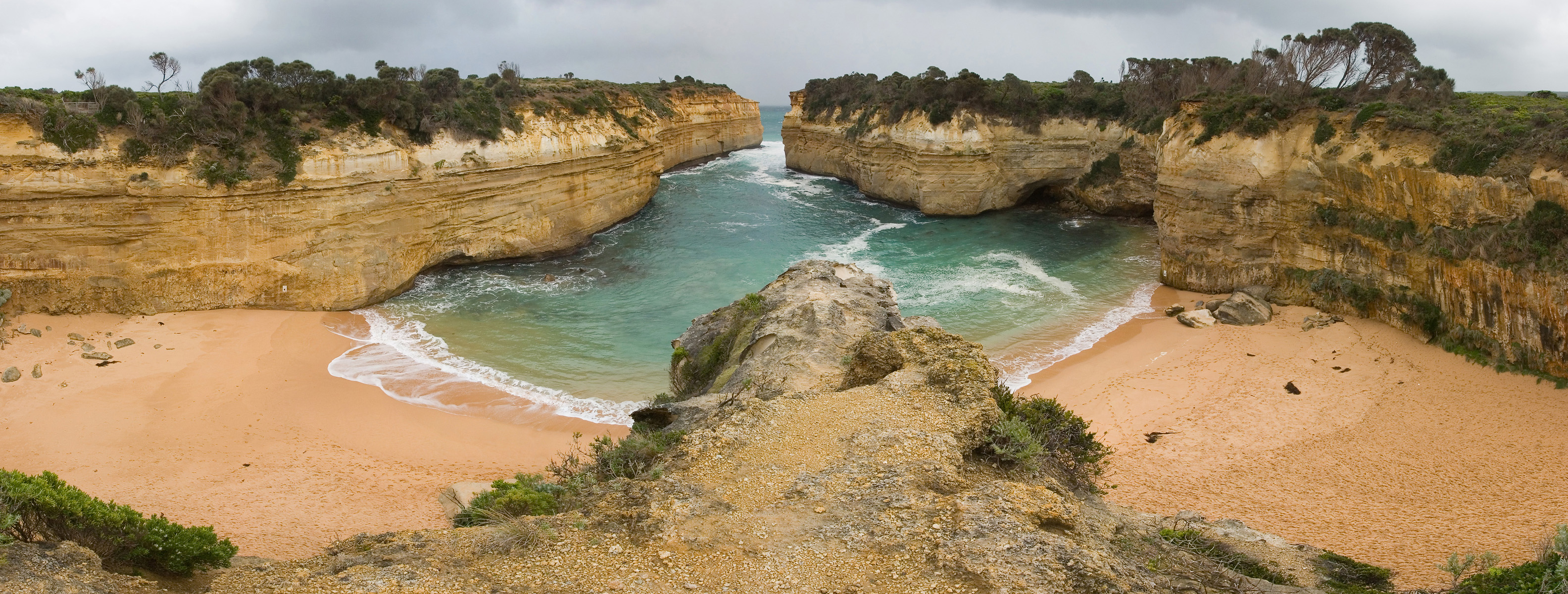
Loch Ard Gorge panorama, July 2005

Aerial views of Loch Ard Gorge and Port Campbell National Park, Victoria, Australia.

The Loch Ard Gorge is part of Port Campbell National Park, Victoria, Australia, about three minutes' drive west of The Twelve Apostles.

== History ==
The gorge is named after the clipper Loch Ard that was shipwrecked on 1 June 1878 near the end of a three-month journey from England to Melbourne. Of 54 passengers and crew, only two survived: Thomas Pearce, one of the ship's apprentices; and Eva Carmichael, an Irishwoman emigrating with her family. Pearce and Carmichael were each 19 years old.

According to memorials at the site, Pearce was washed ashore, and rescued Carmichael from the water after hearing her cries for help. Pearce then climbed out of the gorge to raise the alarm to local pastoralists who quickly came to Carmichael's rescue. Three months after the disaster, which claimed the lives of seven members of her family, Carmichael returned to Ireland. Pearce was hailed a hero, and the Victorian Humane Society awarded him its first Gold Medal. He died aged 49 and is buried in Southampton Old Cemetery, England.

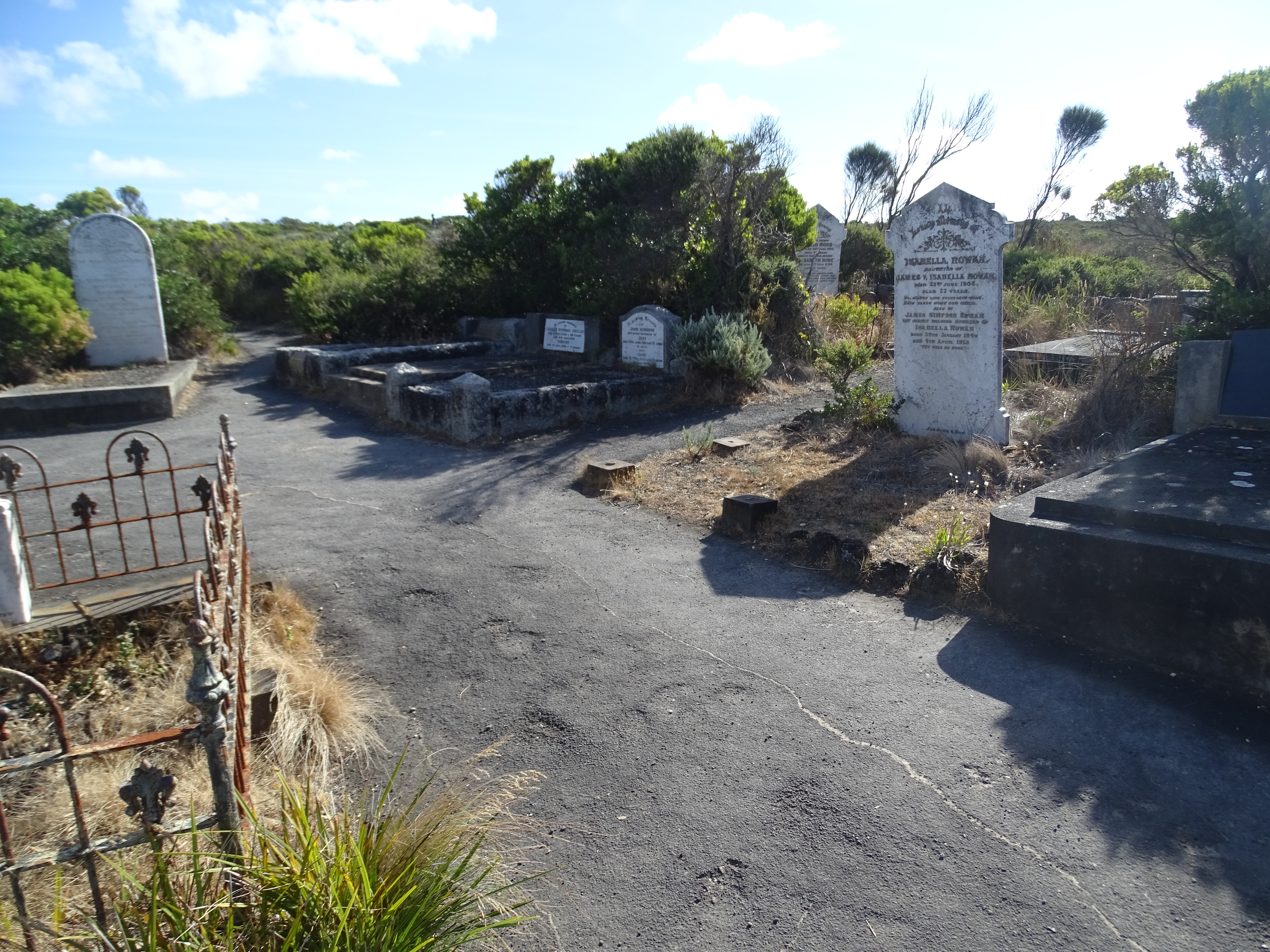
Cemetery for the Loch Ard passengers

At least four of Loch Ard's passengers are buried nearby: Reginald Jones, Arthur Mitchell, Eva Carmichael's elder sister Raby and their mother Rebecca. The bodies of many of the other passengers and crew were never found.

The arch of the nearby Island Archway collapsed in June 2009. The feature now appears as two unconnected rock pillars. They have since been officially named Tom and Eva after the two survivors of the Loch Ard wreck.

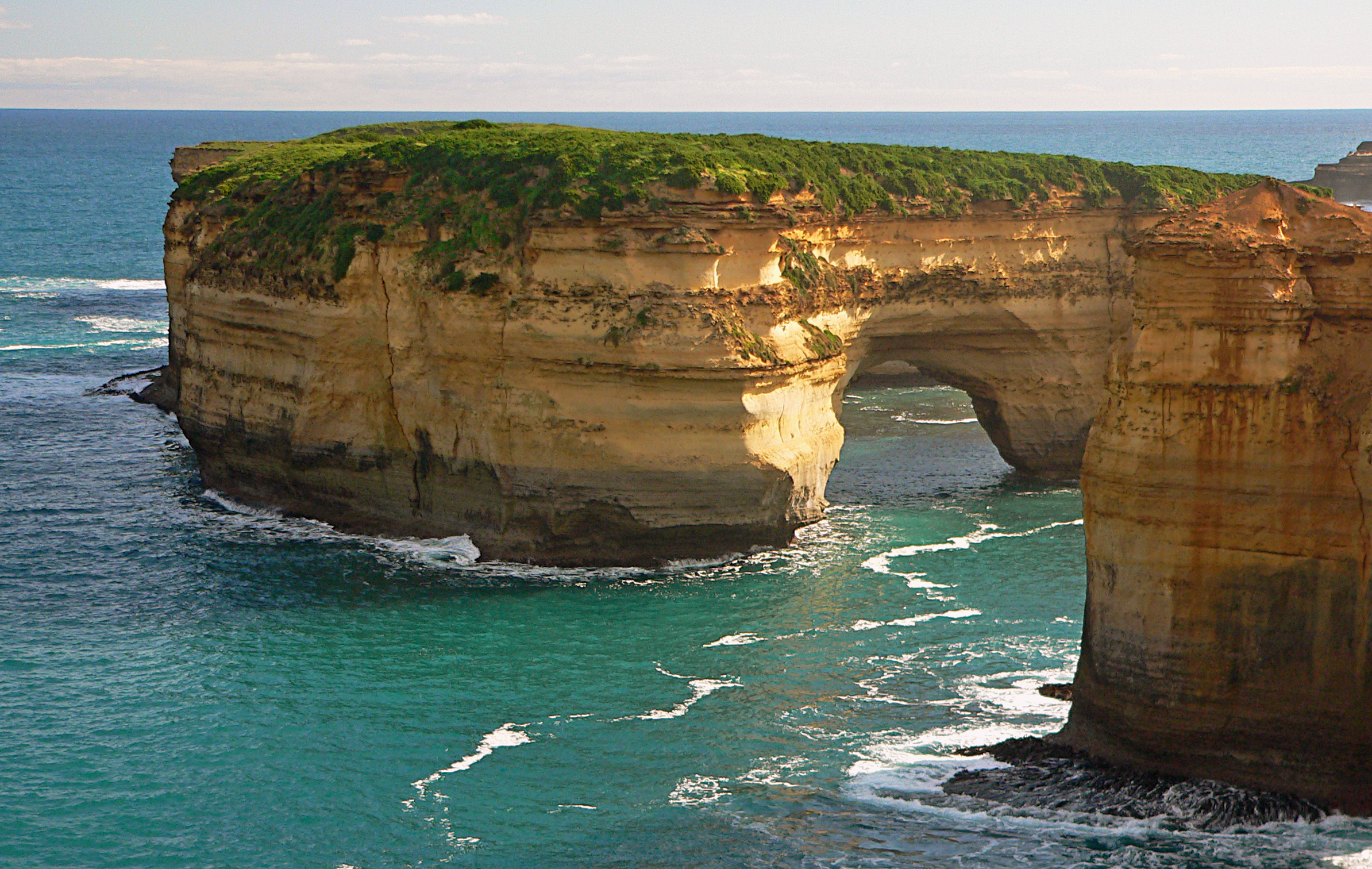
A portion of Loch Ard Gorge

== General ==
The gorge is accessed via the Great Ocean Road, 3.5 kilometres (2 miles) northwest of The Twelve Apostles. Stairs usually allow visitors access to the beach however they are temporarily closed due to geological instability and will remain closed until remediation works are completed. There is a pathway that allows access to the eastern side of the gorge. There are numerous plaques and a small museum detailing the site's history, as well as a rest area, and cemetery housing many of the people that died.

== Fauna ==
The uncommon rufous bristlebird (Dasyornis broadbenti) is often observed around the Gorge.

== In films ==
This was the location for a number of scenes of the 1982 film The Pirate Movie and also the 1999 TV series Journey to the Center of the Earth with Treat Williams. The gorge hosted the final task and finish line for the third series of The Amazing Race Australia.

== See also ==
- Great Ocean Road
- Loch Ard
- Sherbrook River Beach
- London Bridge
- The Gibson Steps
- The Grotto
- Shipwreck Coast
