= Port Campbell =

- Town
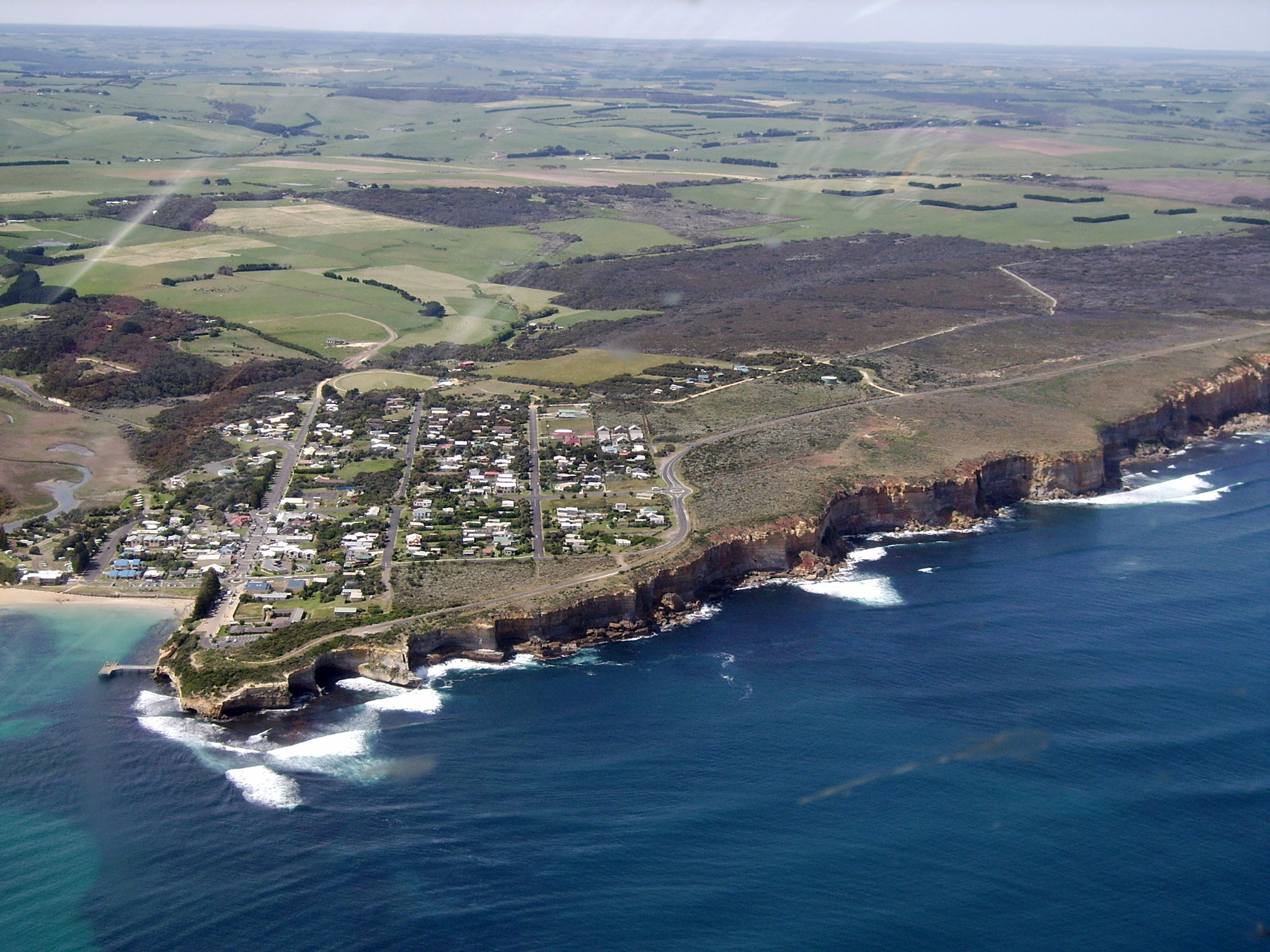
- Aerial photograph of Port Campbell

- Coordinates: 38°37′0″S 142°59′0″E
- Country: Australia
- State: Victoria
- LGA: Corangamite Shire
- Location: 224 km (139 mi) SW of Melbourne; 67 km (42 mi) E of Warrnambool

Government
  - State electorate: Polwarth
  - Federal division: Wannon

Population
  - Total: 440 (2021 census)
- Postcode: 3269
- Mean max temp: 20 °C (68 °F)
- Mean min temp: 7.5 °C (45.5 °F)
- Annual rainfall: 902.9 mm (35.55 in)
Localities around Port Campbell
Heytesbury Lower, Paaratte	Newfield, Waarre	Cooriemungle
Peterborough	Port Campbell	Princetown
Southern Ocean	Southern Ocean	Southern Ocean

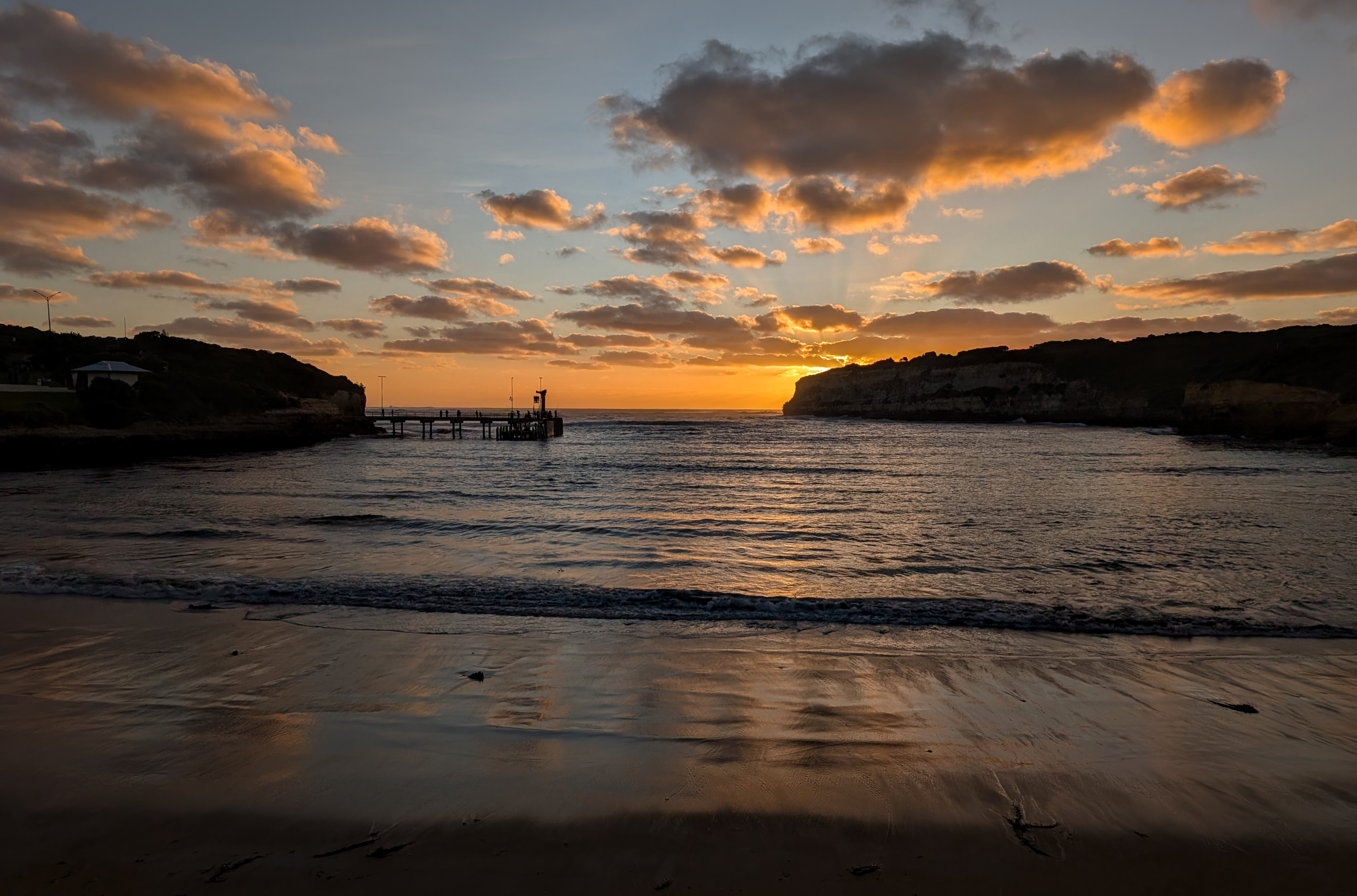
Port Campbell Bay and jetty summer sunset

Port Campbell (/ˈkæmbəl/) is a town in Victoria, Australia. The town is on the Great Ocean Road, west of the Twelve Apostles, in the Shire of Corangamite. At the 2016 census, Port Campbell had a population of 478.

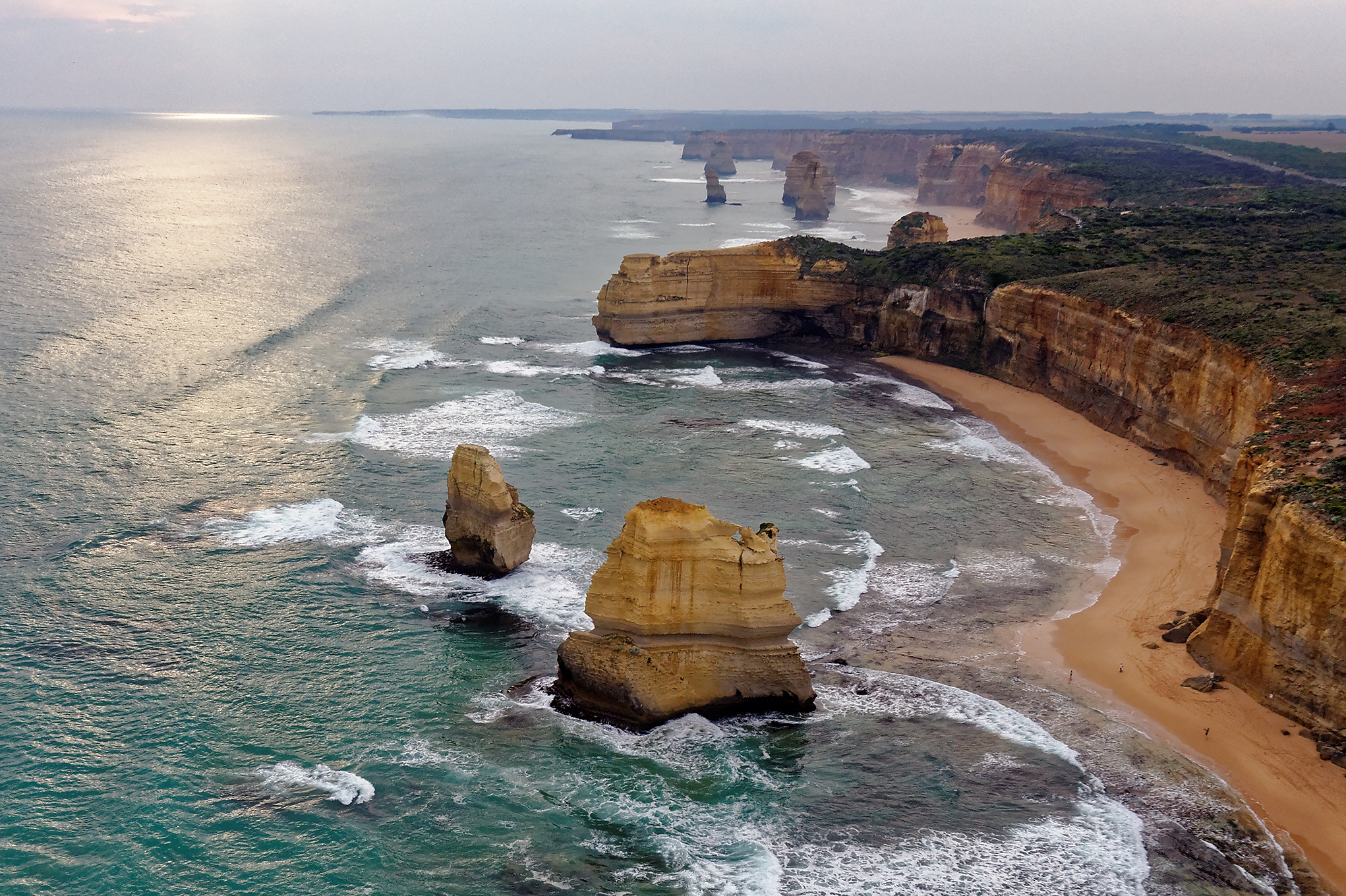
The Twelve Apostles limestone structure

== History ==
The port and the town are named after Captain Alexander Campbell, a whaler and colonist of the Port Fairy region.

The town was settled in the 1870s, with the first wharf being built in 1880. Port Campbell Post Office opened on 19 March 1874. It was renamed Port Campbell West in 1881 when a new Port Campbell office opened near the wharf. There were hopes of a rail connection when the Timboon line opened in 1892 but the state government vetoed the idea in 1916.

The town became a centre of infamy in 1970 when the bodies of a family from Melbourne were discovered in a car that had fallen over a cliff, see Crawford family murder.

The town used to be the centre of a football competition known as the Port Campbell Football Association that operated from 1927, it reformed after WWII as the Heytesbury Football League and ran until 1991.

At the 2001 census, Port Campbell had a population of 372. At the 2006 census, Port Campbell had a population of 599. At the 2011 census, Port Campbell had a population of 618.

Port Campbell is now a popular tourist destination for visiting The Twelve Apostles, located 12 kilometres to the east of the town and the Port Campbell National Park, as well as maintaining a small crayfishing community.

== Gallery ==
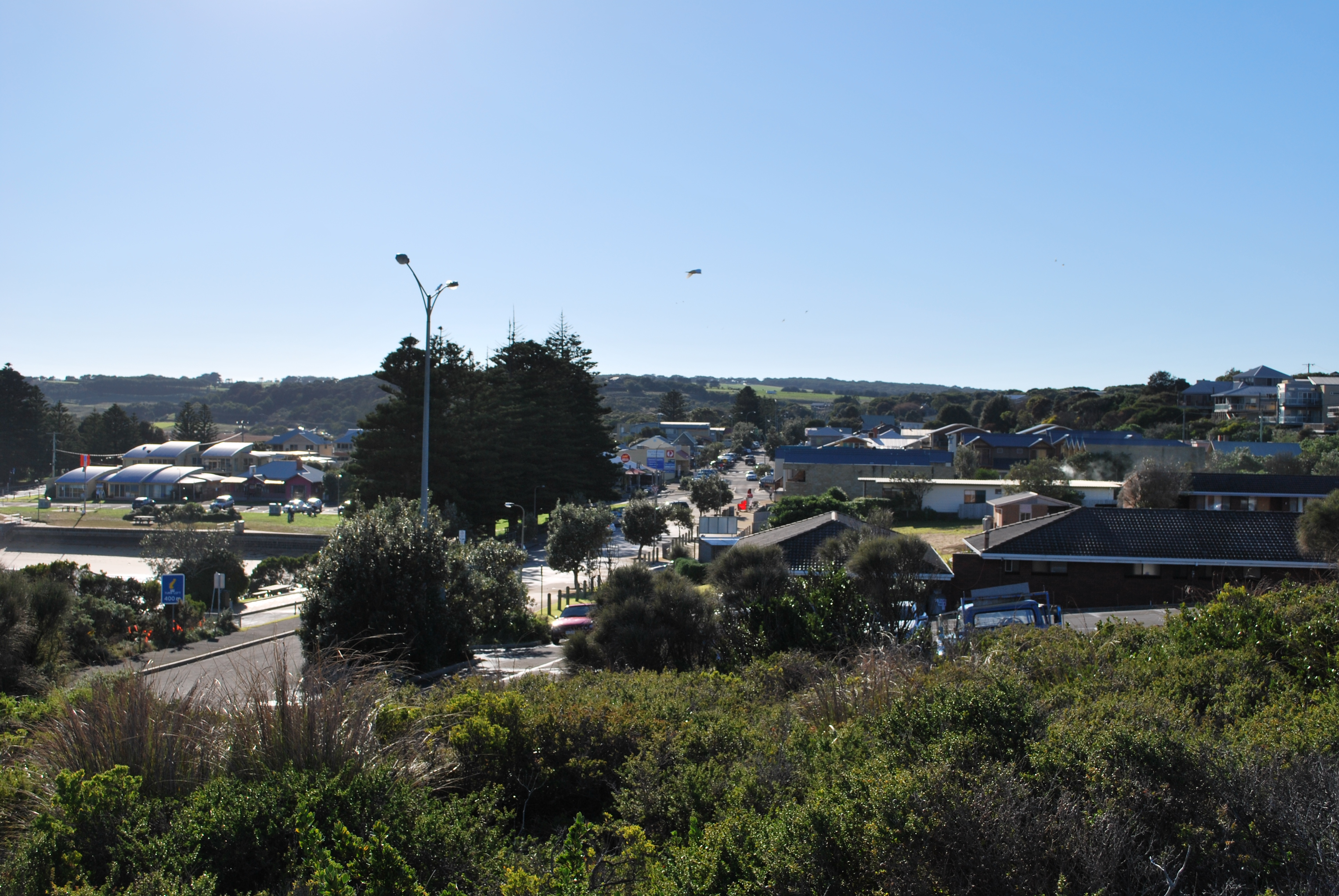
The town seen from the war memorial lookout

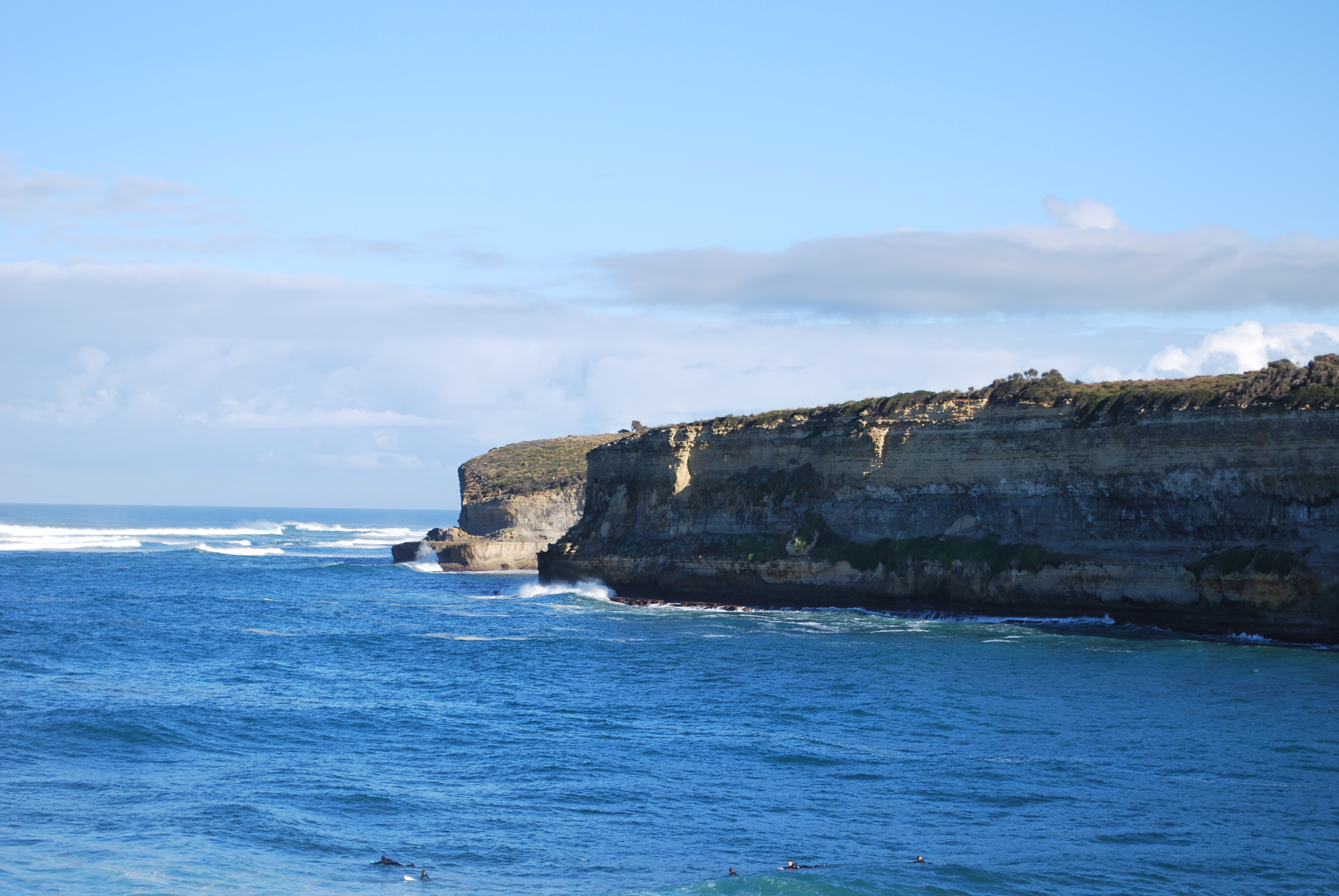
The headland of the harbour at Port Campbell

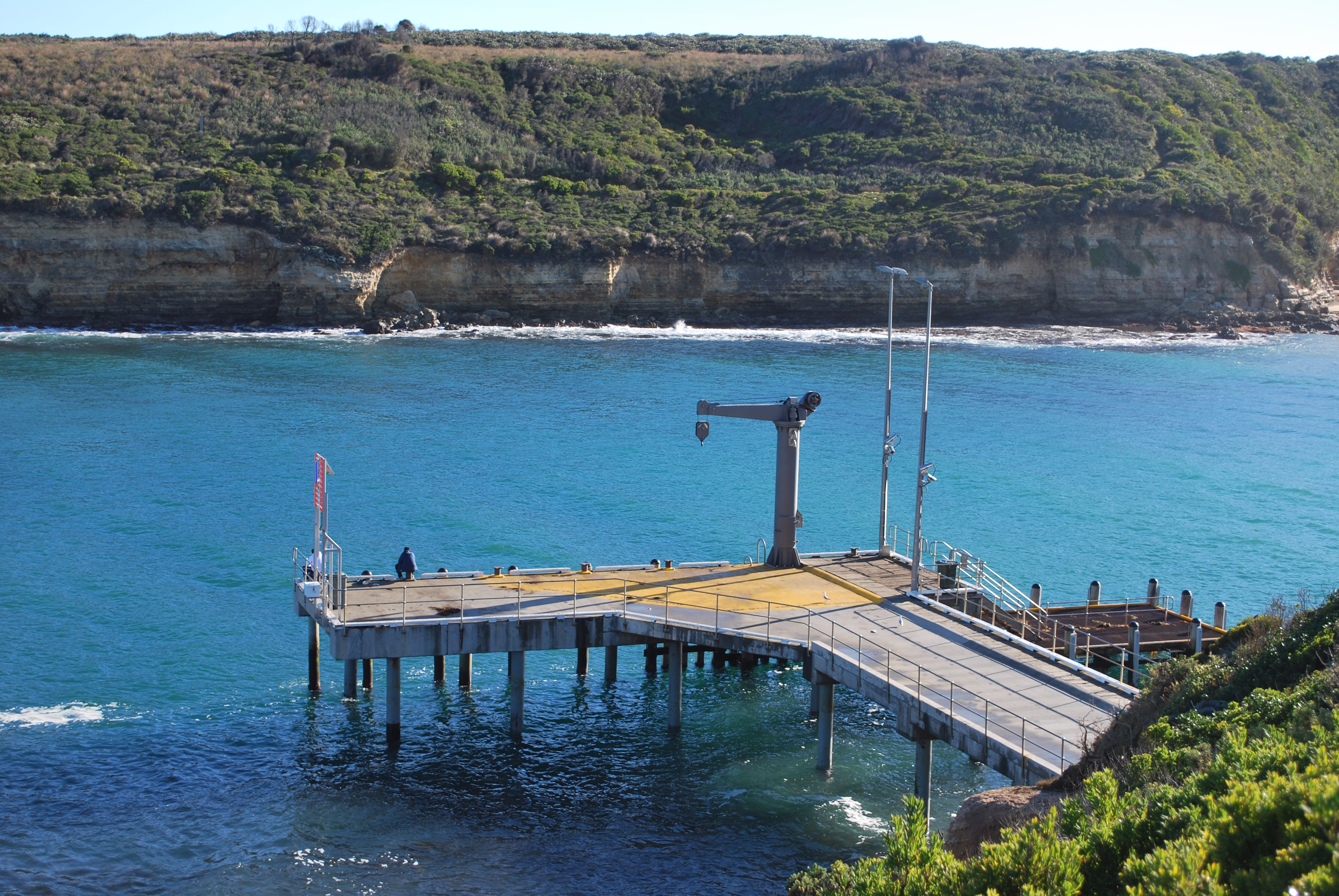
The fishing docks

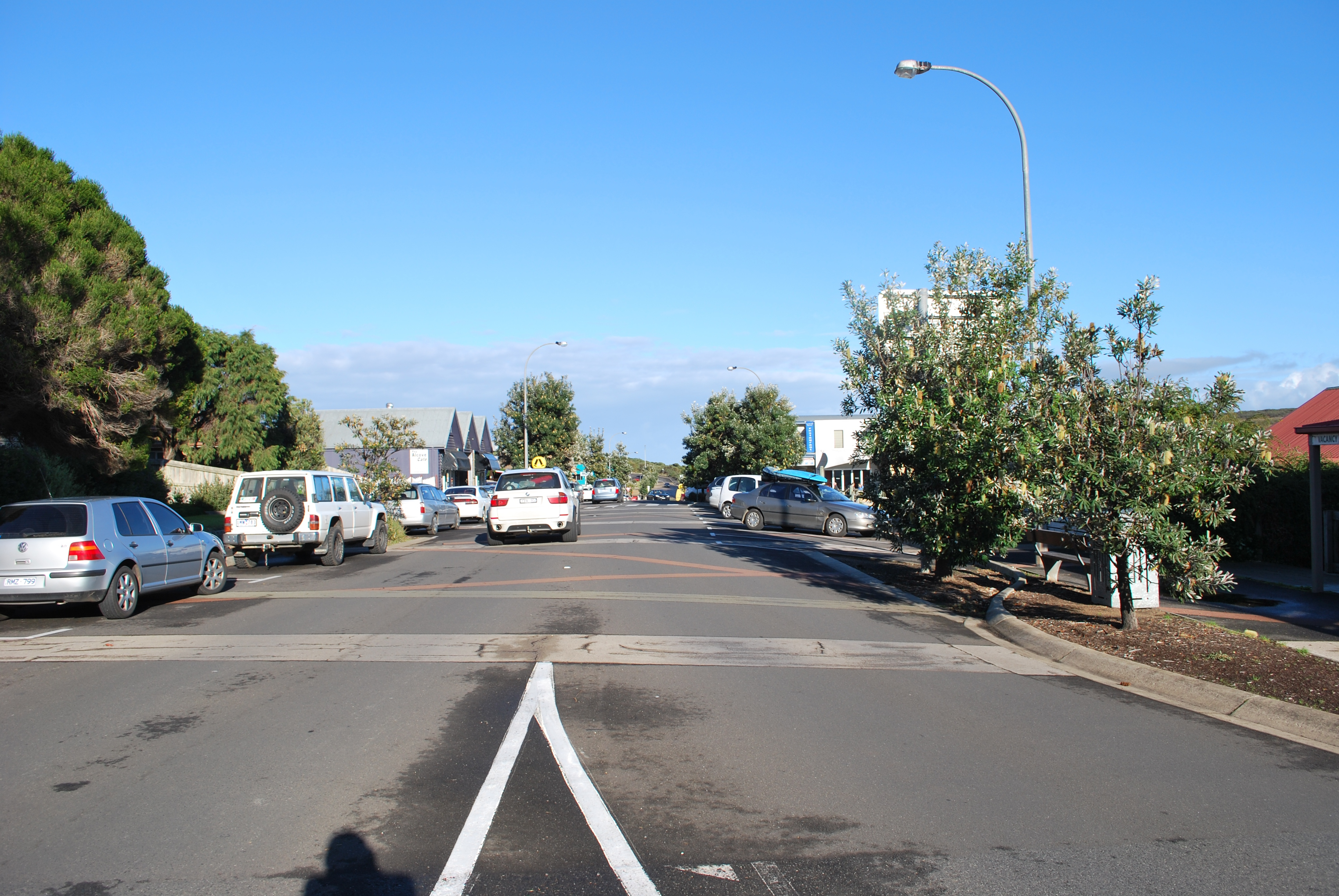
Lord Street
