= The Twelve Apostles (Victoria) =

Limestone stacks in Australia

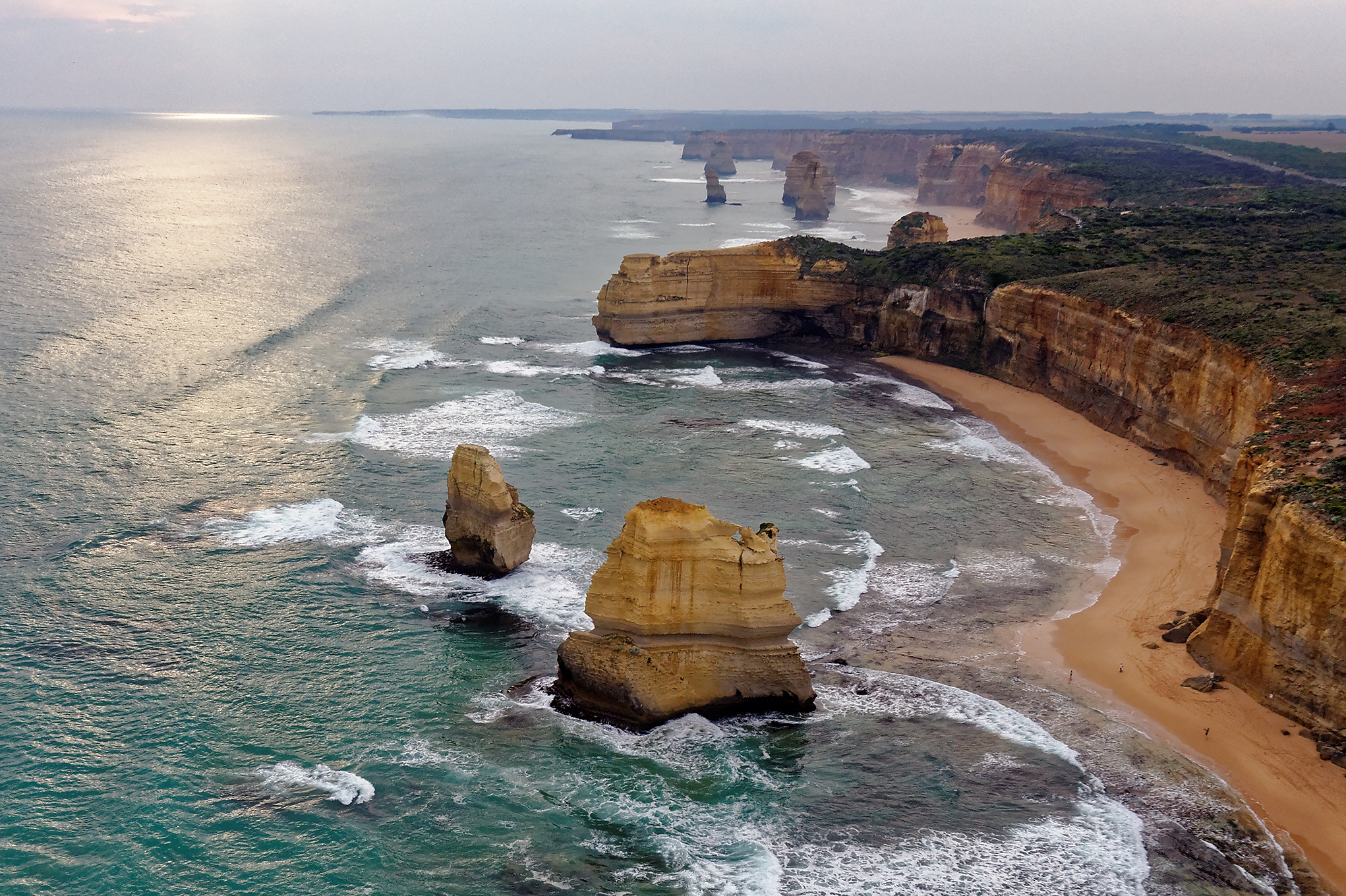

- Location within Corangamite Shire

Geography
- Location: Near Port Campbell, Victoria
- Coordinates: 38°39′57″S 143°06′16″E

Administration
- Australia
- State: Victoria
- LGA: Shire of Corangamite

The Twelve Apostles are a collection of limestone stacks off the shore of Port Campbell National Park, by the Great Ocean Road in Victoria, Australia.

Their proximity to one another has made the site a popular tourist attraction. Despite their name, it is possible that there were never 12 rock stacks. Seven of the original nine stacks remain standing. Six of them are visible from the most popular viewpoint, while the seventh is located several metres away from the corner of the main viewing platform.

== Name ==
The stacks were originally known as the Pinnacles; the Sow and Pigs (or Sow and Piglets, with Muttonbird Island being the Sow and the smaller rock stacks being the Piglets); and the Twelve Apostles. The formation's name was made official as the Twelve Apostles, after the Apostles of Jesus, to attract more tourists, despite only ever having had nine stacks.

== Formation and history ==
The limestone unit that forms The Twelve Apostles is referred to as the Port Campbell Limestone, which was deposited in the Mid-Late Miocene, around 15 to 5 million years ago.

The Twelve Apostles were formed by erosion. The harsh and extreme weather conditions from the Southern Ocean gradually eroded the soft limestone to form caves in the cliffs, which then became arches that eventually collapsed, leaving rock stacks up to 50 m (160 ft) high. The stacks are susceptible to further erosion from waves.

=== Modern history ===
In July 2005, a 50-metre-tall (160 ft) stack collapsed, leaving eight standing. Another collapsed in 2009, leaving seven remaining stacks. Due to wave action eroding the cliffs, existing headlands are expected to become new limestone stacks in the future.

In 2002, the Port Campbell Professional Fishermen's Association attempted to block the creation of the Twelve Apostles Marine National Park at the Twelve Apostles site. The association approved of a later decision by the Victorian government to prohibit seismic exploration at the site by Benaris Energy, believing such exploration would harm marine life.

In March 2023, the Federal Court of Australia ruled in favour (under the Native Title Act of 1993) of formally recognising the Eastern Maar people as traditional owners of 8,578 km^{2} of land located in south-west Victoria, including the Twelve Apostles.

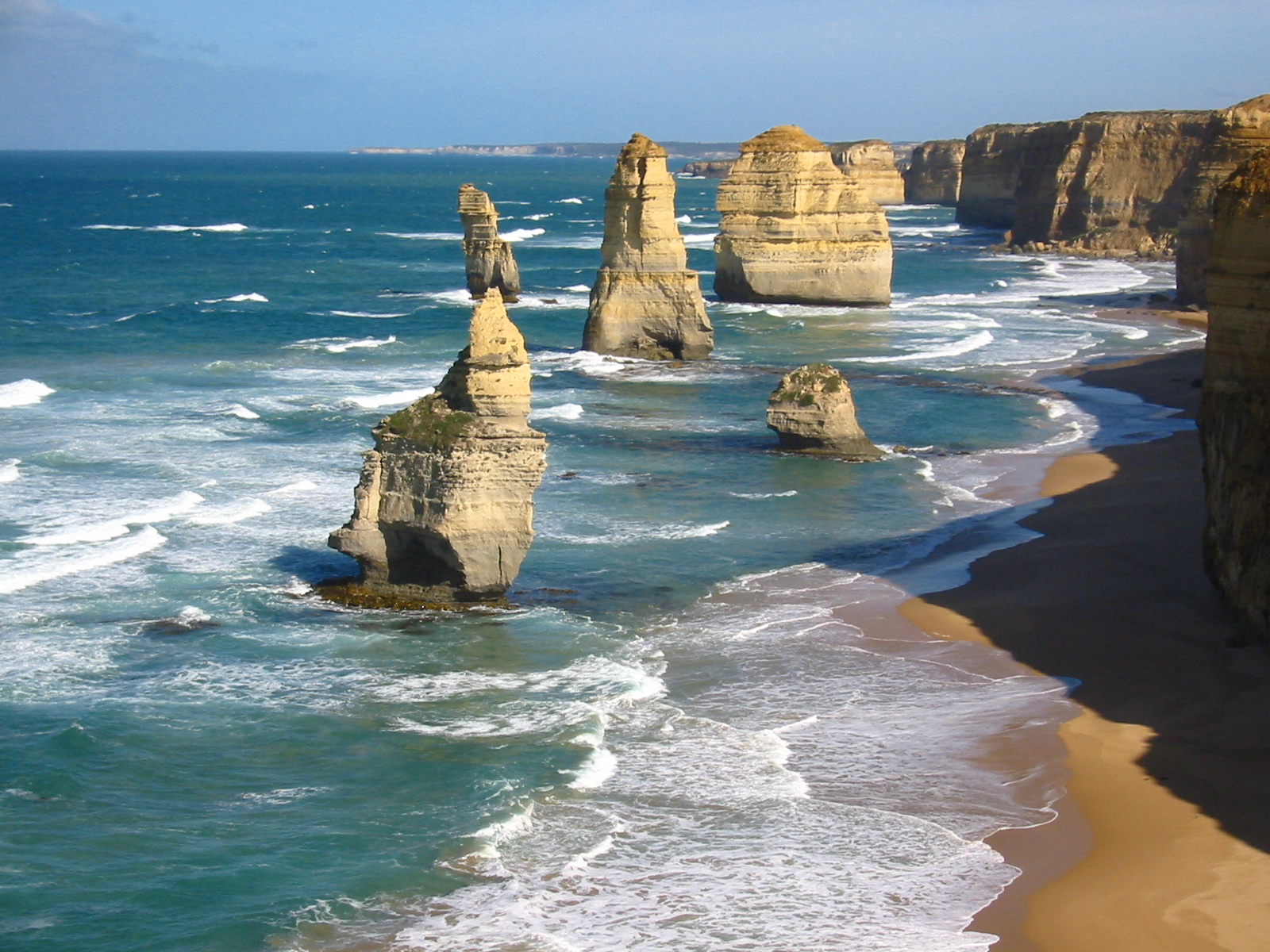
2003 before the collapse

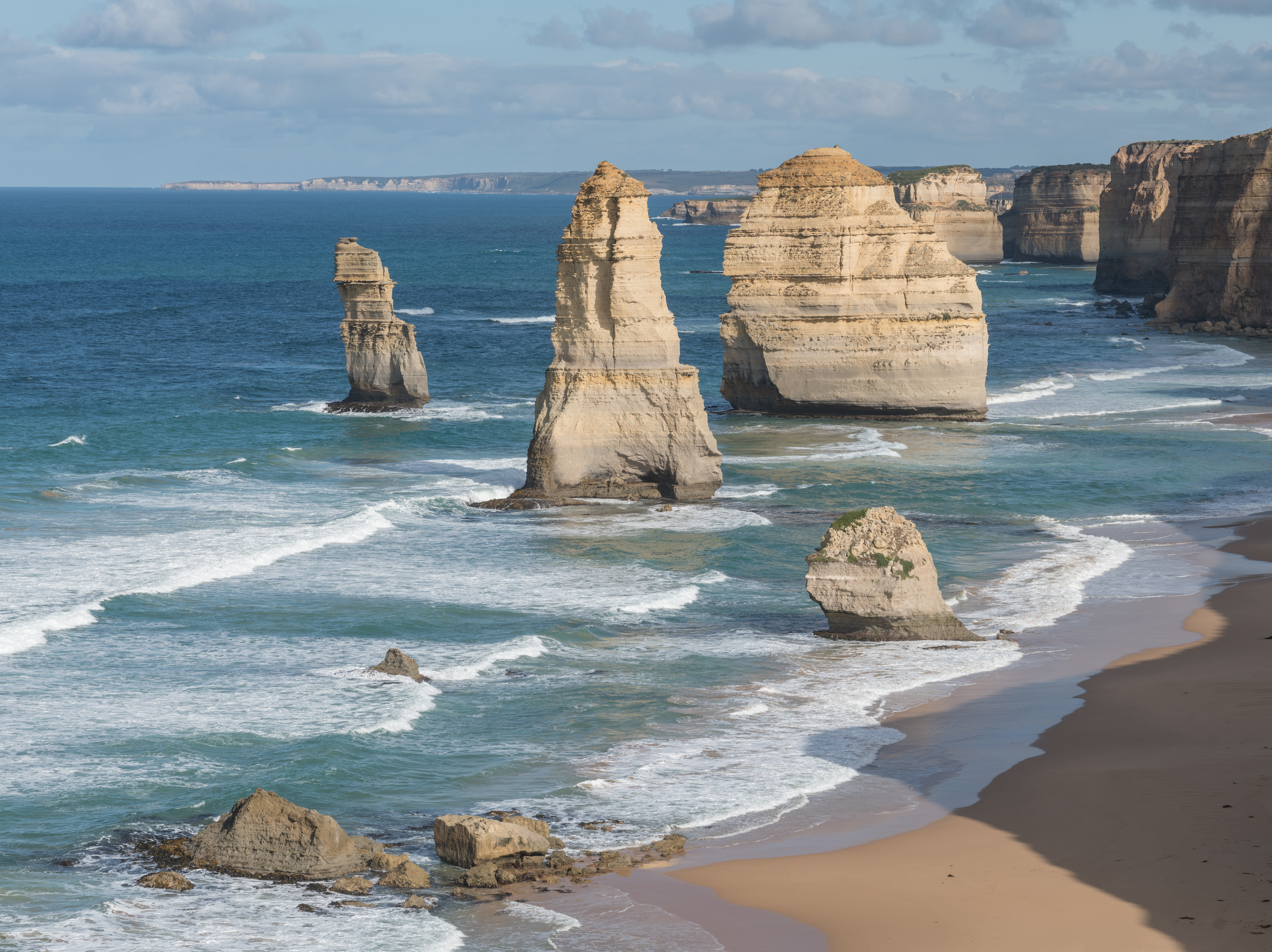
2023 after the collapse

== See also ==
- Gibson Steps
- London Bridge
- Loch Ard Gorge
