= Thomas Richard Pearce =

Irish ship master

- Born: Thomas Richard Millett; 31 October 1859; Millbrook, County Tipperary
- Died: 14 December 1908 (aged 49); Portswood, Southampton
- Burial place: Southampton Old Cemetery; 50°55′13″N 1°24′47″W
- Occupation: sea captain
- Years active: 1875–1906
- Employer(s): Aitken & Lilburn, then RMSP
- Known for: surviving shipwrecks
- Spouse: Edith Gurney Strasenburgh
- Children: 3
- Awards: Victorian Humane Society Gold Medal

Thomas Richard Pearce (1859–1908), born Thomas Richard Millett, was an Irish ship master in the UK merchant marine. He served his apprenticeship on sailing ships with Aitken & Lilburn's Loch Line, and then rose through the ranks on steamships with the Royal Mail Steam Packet Company (RMSP).

On sailing ships Pearce survived three shipwrecks: those of Eliza Ramsden in 1875, Loch Ard in 1878, and Loch Sunart in 1879. When Loch Ard was wrecked he saved a passenger from drowning, for which the Victorian Humane Society awarded him its first ever Gold Medal.

Pearce's stepfather was a ship master, both of Pearce's sons went to sea, and all three died in shipwrecks. In 1906 Pearce took early retirement due to ill-health. His death in 1908, aged only 49, prompted RMSP to found its superannuation fund.

== Upbringing ==
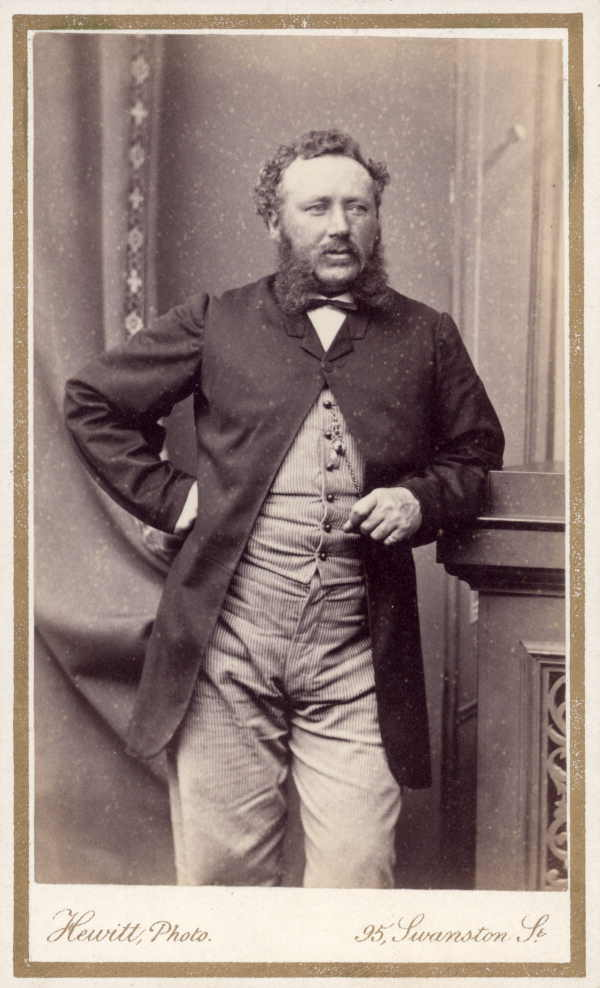
Pearce's stepfather, Captain RGA Pearce

Thomas Richard Millett was born on 31 October 1859 at Millbrook, near Cappawhite, County Tipperary, Ireland. He was the son of Richard and Emily Millett. Richard was an engineer, emigrated with his wife and children to Melbourne, and then travelled on business to New Zealand, where in 1874 he died. Captain Robert George Augustus Pearce married his widow, and Thomas Richard Millett took Pearce's surname. In 1875 RGA Pearce was killed when his command, SS Gothenburg, was wrecked off the coast of Queensland.

Thomas Richard Pearce, as he now was, began his marine apprenticeship with a voyage to Boston. Then he was a member of the crew of the sailing barque Eliza Ramsden, when she was wrecked just inside Port Phillip Heads on 24 July 1875. That was exactly five months after his stepfather was killed on Gothenburg.

== Loch Ard ==
By early 1877 Pearce was with Messrs Aitken and Lilburn of Glasgow, and was serving on Loch Ard between the United Kingdom and Australia.

Pearce was on Loch Ard in February 1878, when she loaded cargo at East India Docks in London. This was his third voyage on her. She called at Gravesend, Kent, where her compasses were adjusted. She left there on 1, 2 or 3 March 1878 (reports differ). She was carrying cargo, 17 passengers and 37 crew, bound for Melbourne. The passengers included a Dr and Mrs Carmichael from Dublin, a wealthy couple who were emigrating with their four daughters and two sons.

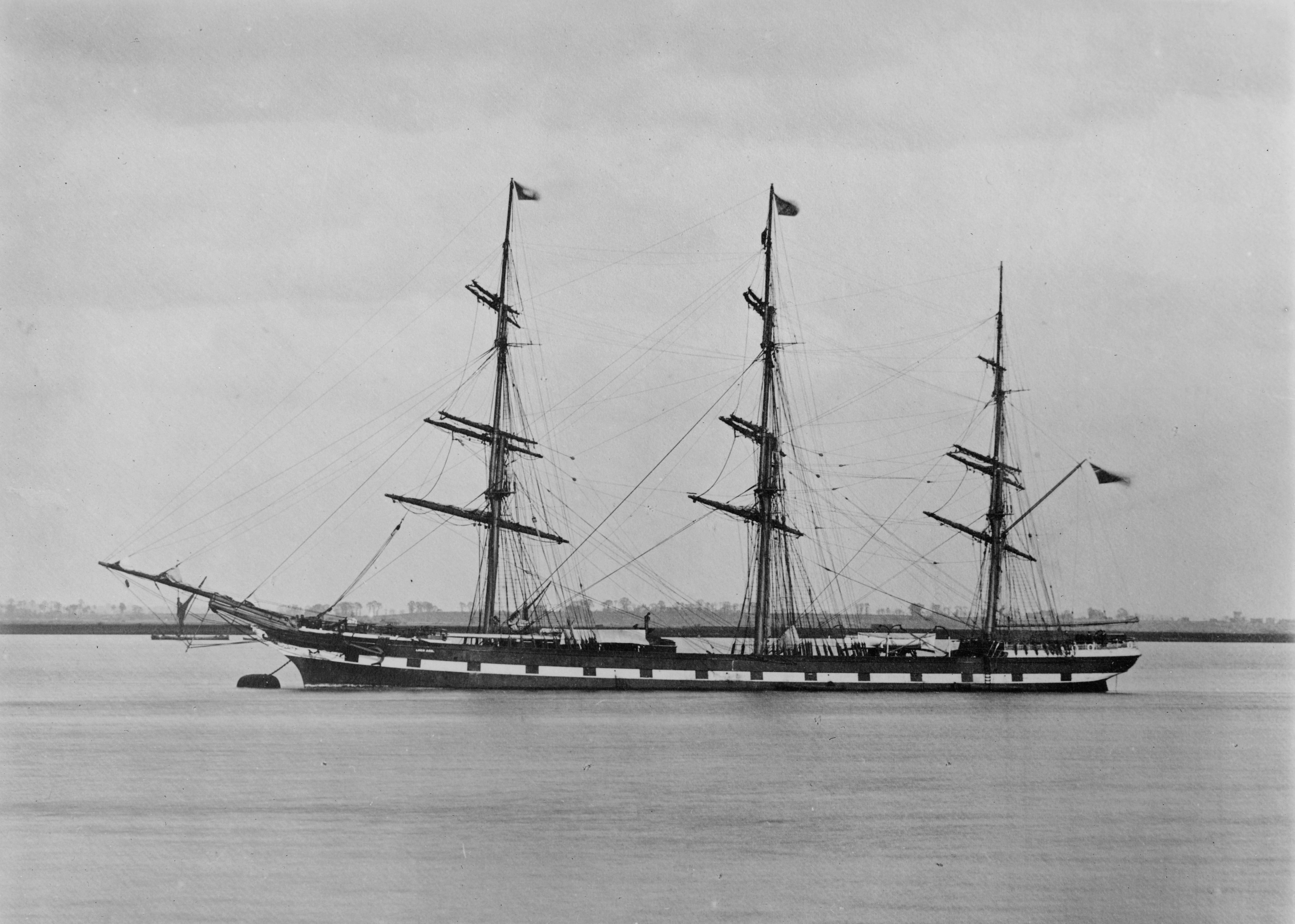
Loch Ard moored

Pearce was on duty in the small hours of 1 June when Loch Ard struck rocks on the Shipwreck Coast of Victoria. Passengers came on deck, some wearing only their nightclothes. The ship had four boats, including a lifeboat on the port side and a gig. These were the only boats carried the right way up, ready to be launched. The other boats were stowed bottom up.

Some reports said that the ship had only five lifebelts and six lifejackets. Dr Carmichael and the ship's steward got the lifejackets out of the ship's lazarette, and put them on six of the passengers: Dr and Mrs Carmichael, their elder daughters Raby and Eva, and a Mr and Mrs Stuckey. The jackets were in poor condition, and their strings broke several times when fastened.

The lifeboat was washed overboard. Pearce and five crewmen were in the boat for a few minutes, but it capsized. Pearce found himself under the boat, but swam out. The boat righted and capsized again more than once, but each time Pearce clung to its upturned keel. The boat and other wreckage drifted into an inlet that was then called The Caves and is now called Loch Ard Gorge. There it struck a rock, throwing Pearce into the water. He swam ashore, using a floating table as a buoyancy aid.

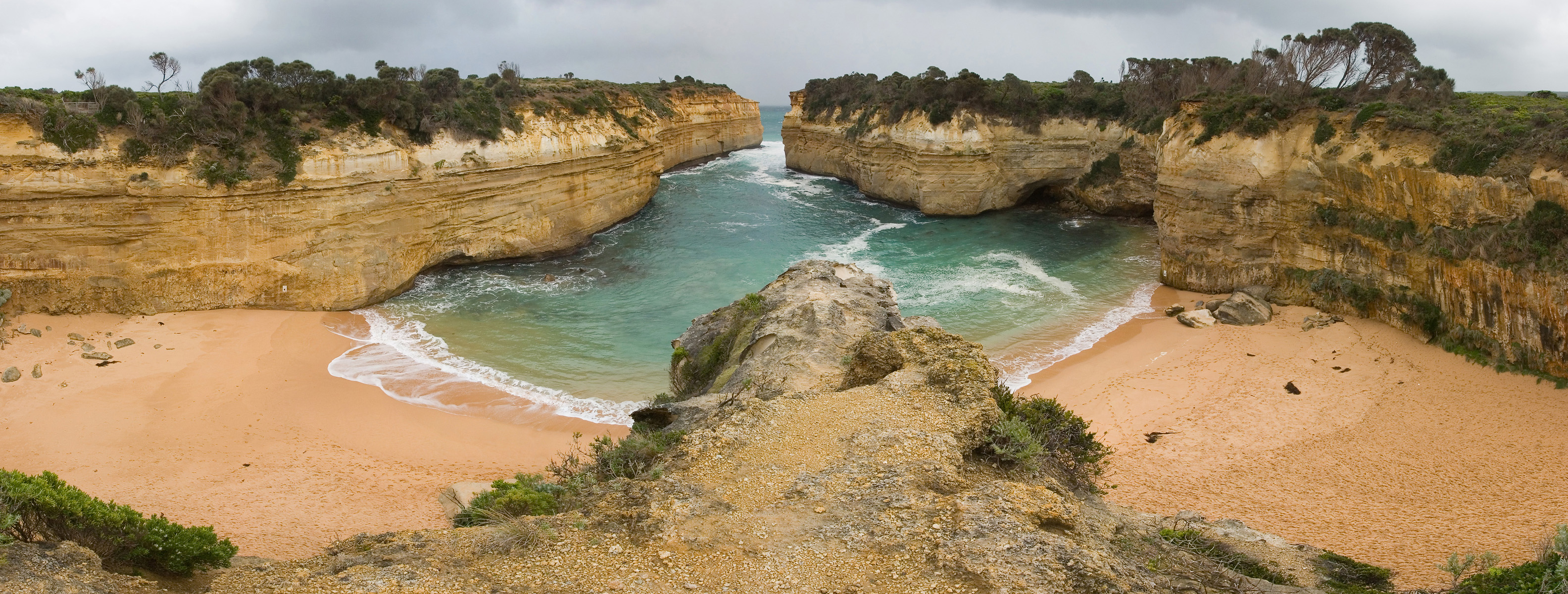
Loch Ard Gorge on the Shipwreck Coast, where Pearce brought Eva Carmichael ashore

In the water three passengers, Reginald Jones, Arthur Mitchell, and the Carmichaels' second daughter, Eva, clung to a hen coop that was floating among the wreckage. The coop kept turning over, so the trio transferred to a floating spar. Later Jones and then Mitchell were washed away, and Carmichael lost consciousness, but her lifejacket and the spar kept her afloat and alive. Later she regained consciousness, but she did not know how to swim. Pearce heard her call for help and swam out. It took him an hour in the rough sea to bring her ashore in the gorge. Pearce and Carmichael were the only survivors of the 54 people aboard. Each was 19 years old.

Carmichael was cold and weak. Pearce brought her to a cave under a cliff, then found two coats and a case of brandy among the wreckage. He gave the coats to Carmichael, and they shared a half-bottle of brandy. He rested for a couple of hours, then left Carmichael asleep and climbed about 100 to 150 feet (30 to 46 m) up a cliff. He found and followed a track. Early that afternoon he met a man on horseback called George Ford. Ford rode for help to Glenample at Curdie's Inlet, the station of Peter McArthur, JP, and Hugh Gibson. Gibson and some men rode to the gorge, and brought a horse and buggy to transport Carmichael, but she had woken up and wandered away. They found her about 1/2 mi (800 m) from where Pearce left her, and then with some difficulty helped her up the cliff.

Pearce and Carmichael stayed with for some days at Glenample. Pearce helped with the recovery of salvage and identification of bodies from the wreck, while Mrs Gibson nursed Carmichael. The bodies of Carmichael's mother and her elder sister Raby were found, as well of those of Jones and Mitchell, and on 5 June the four were buried on the clifftop. By 7 June a Captain Trouton of the Australasian Steam Navigation Company in Sydney had started a subscription fund to make a presentation to Pearce as a reward for saving Carmichael.

On 15 June the Mayor of Melbourne chaired a meeting at Melbourne Town Hall to decide how best to use the various public donations being made as a testimonial to Pearce. A group of horseracing gamblers had donated £32 10s, and Melbourne City Corporation staff had donated £5. There were proposals that the money be spent on sending him to navigation college, or even that a ship be bought for him and named Eva Carmichael. Aitken and Lilburn's agents in Melbourne were John Blyth & Co, whose representative told the meeting that when Pearce reached Melbourne he would join their ship Loch Shiel to complete his apprenticeship.

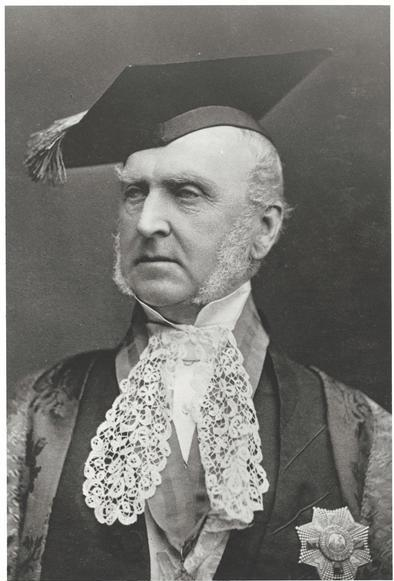
Sir Redmond Barry, who presented Pearce with a Victorian Humane Society Gold Medal

Pearce planned to move from Glenample to stay with an aunt in the Toorak area of Melbourne. On 20 June the Victorian Humane Society held its annual award ceremony in Melbourne Town Hall. Sir Redmond Barry presented the awards, including a Gold Medal to Pearce, the first the Society had ever awarded.

On 21 June the Steam Navigation Board met at the Custom House in Melbourne to inquire into the loss of Loch Ard. Pearce testified to the Board that a fortnight before the ship reached the Australian coast, he and the officers noted that the ship's compasses were slightly out of adjustment, with a slight disagreement between the standard and binnacle compasses. Contrary to earlier newspaper reports, he told the inquiry that he believed the ship carried about 16 lifejackets.

According to a 1934 report, Pearce was engaged to be married, but he offered to Carmichael to break off his engagement and marry her instead. The report claims that she declined his offer as they had "nothing in common" and it would be wrong for him to abandon his fiancée.

On 18 July Loch Shiel left Hobson's Bay, bound for London, presumably with Pearce aboard. Carmichael returned to Ireland, where she later married a Thomas Townshend from County Cork.

== Loch Sunart and Loch Katrine ==
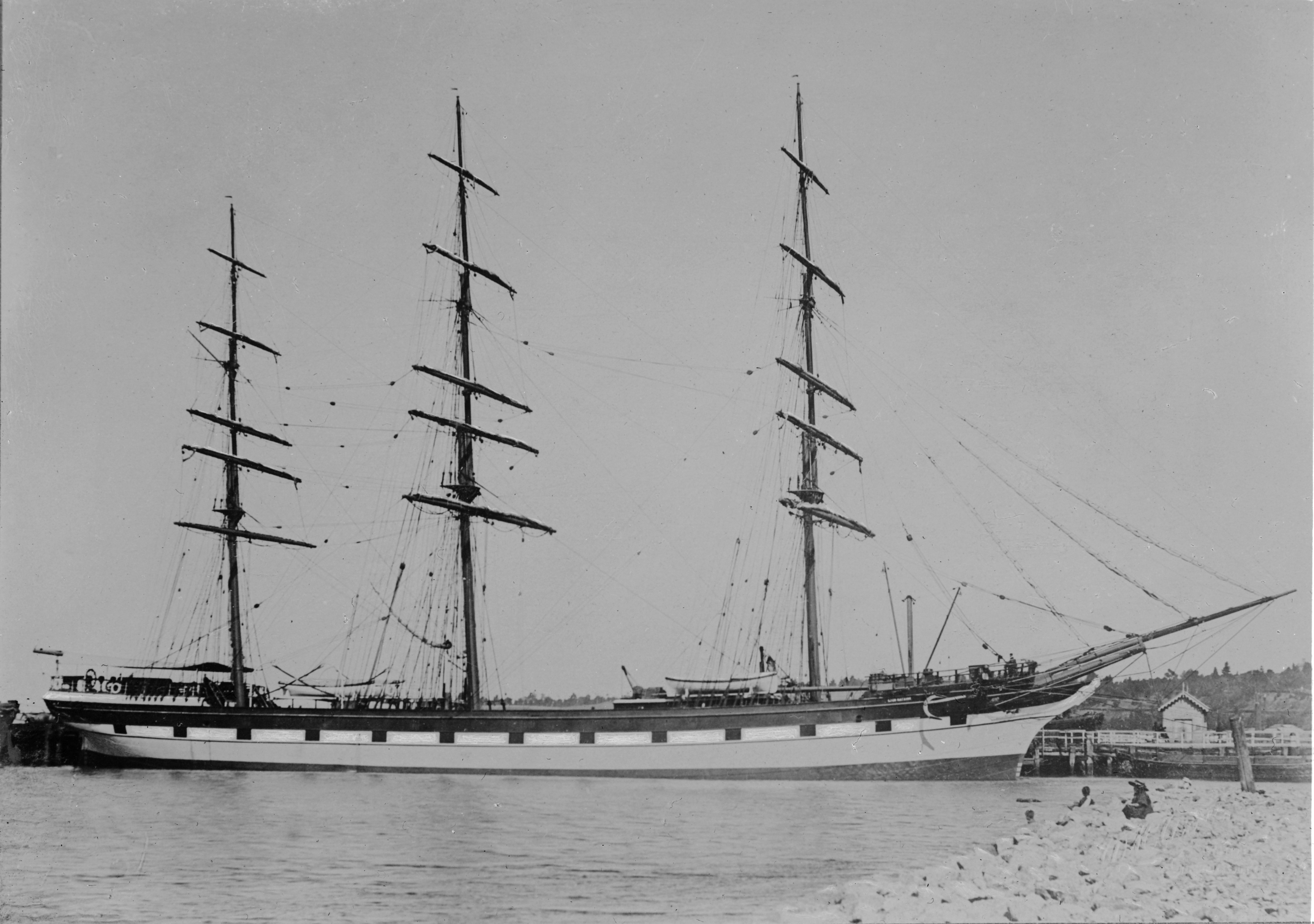
Loch Katrine in Geelong

Pearce continued his apprenticeship in Loch Sunart. In January 1879 she left Glasgow for Melbourne, but on 13 January she was wrecked on Skullmartin Rock in Ballywalter Bay, on the coast of the Ards Peninsula, County Down. No lives were lost, and all passengers and crew were safely brought ashore in boats.

According to one account, Pearce completed his apprenticeship on another Aitken and Lilburn ship, Loch Katrine.

== Marriage and children ==
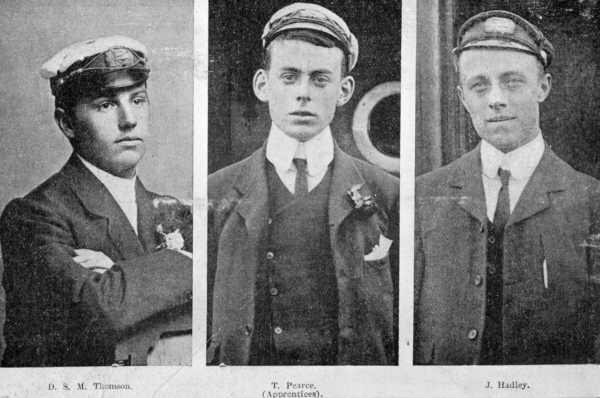
Apprentices killed on Loch Vennachar, from left to right: DSM Thomson, Thomas William Pearce, and Joseph Hadley

Pearce was engaged to Edith Strasenburgh, whose brother Robert was a fellow-apprentice killed on Loch Ard. On 14 August 1884 they were married at St George's, Hanover Square, London. They had two sons and a daughter. Both sons were apprenticed to Aitken and Lilburn: the elder, Thomas William Pearce, in Loch Vennachar and the younger, Robert Strasenburgh Pearce, in Loch Etive.

On an unknown date in September 1905 Loch Vennachar was lost with all hands on the west coast of Kangaroo Island, South Australia. Thomas William was one of three apprentices killed in the wreck. It was his fourth trip to Australia aboard her.

== Orinoco and Trent ==
After his apprenticeship with Aitken and Lilburn, Pearce changed to steamships and rose through the ranks of the Royal Mail Steam Packet Company. By 1905 he was Master of an RMSP ship "trading between Southampton and the West Indies". In 1906 he was given command of the liner RMS Orinoco.

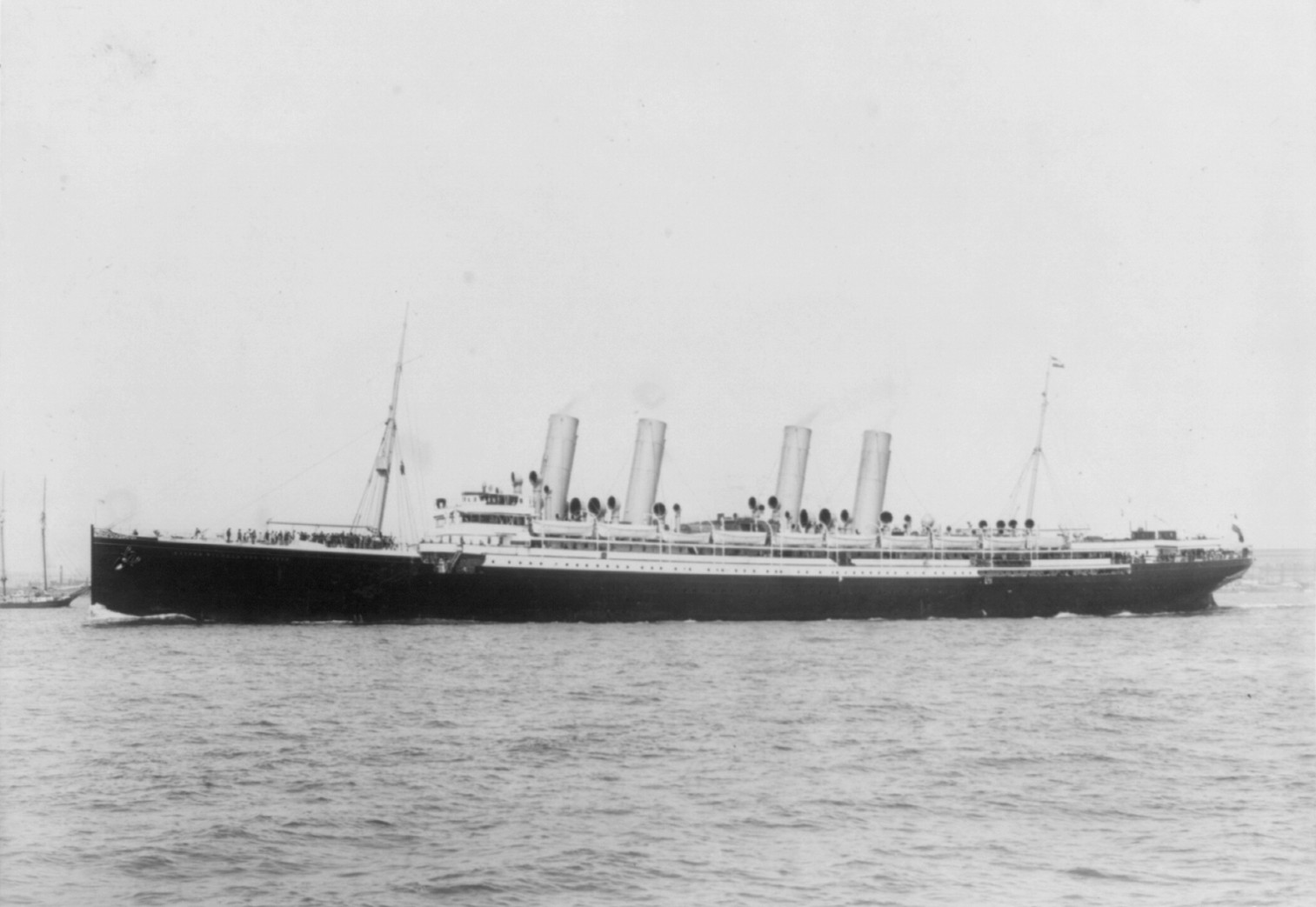
Kaiser Wilhelm der Grosse, with which RMS Orinoco collided in 1906

On 21 November 1906 in Cherbourg Harbour Orinoco collided in fog with the Norddeutscher Lloyd transatlantic ocean liner Kaiser Wilhelm der Grosse. Orinoco's clipper bow penetrated Kaiser Wilhelm der Grosse's starboard side, killing four people aboard the German ship and at least one on Orinoco. A court of inquiry found Kaiser Wilhelm der Grosse wholly responsible for the collision.

RMSP then gave Pearce command of the liner Trent, also trading between Southampton and the West Indies. However, less than two years after the collision he was relieved of his command due to ill-health. He died on 14 December 1908, and is buried in Southampton Old Cemetery.

RMSP deputed one of its Directors to attend Pearce's funeral. There is no record of RMSP having taken such a step for the death of any officer previously. Edith Pearce was widowed with two surviving children. Some RMSP Directors proposed paying her £500 ex gratia. Others disagreed, so the Court of Directors held a special meeting. The meeting not only approved the proposal to pay her £500, but also decided to establish a superannuation fund to provide for retirees and their dependants.

== Robert Pearce ==
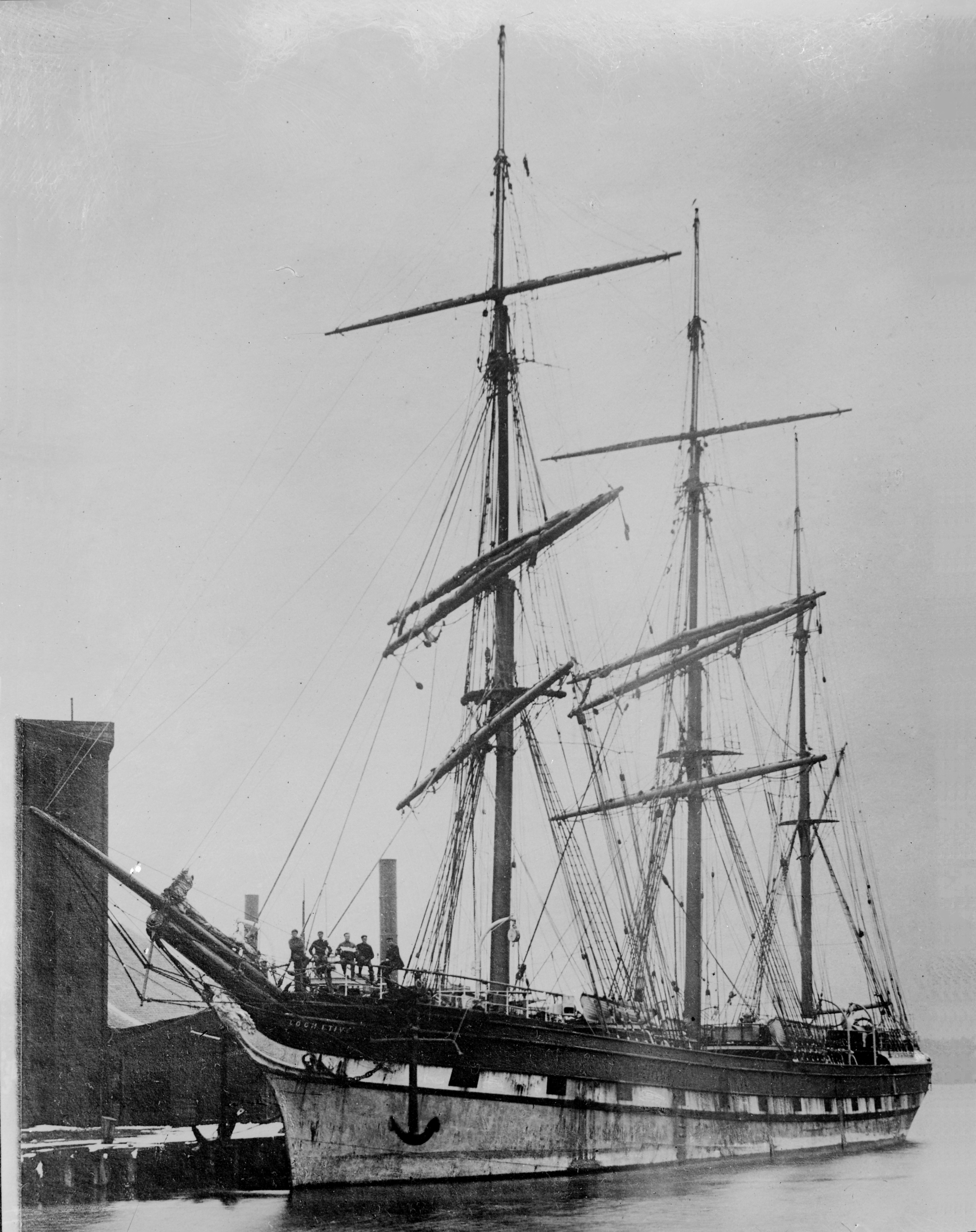
Loch Etive, in which Robert Pearce served his apprenticeship

Robert Strasenburgh Pearce (1887-1942) completed his apprenticeship with Aitken and Lilburn. In October 1915 he was commissioned as a sub-lieutenant in the Royal Naval Reserve. By December 1918 he was a full lieutenant and was mentioned in dispatches at Malta. In October 1919 he was awarded the Distinguished Service Cross. One source says Robert was on a minesweeping naval trawler when she accidentally hauled aboard a live mine. It detonated, sinking the trawler, and Robert was one of only two survivors. Another source says he served on Q-ships.

In his Merchant Navy career, Robert served with Aberdeen and Commonwealth Line and then Shaw, Savill & Albion Line. He lived in the Sydney suburb of Watsons Bay. By the early 1930s he was Chief Officer on the refrigerated cargo steamship Pakeha. Eva Townshend, by then widowed and living in Bedford, England, traced him with the help of a London newspaper, and wrote asking to meet him and "talk over the old days".

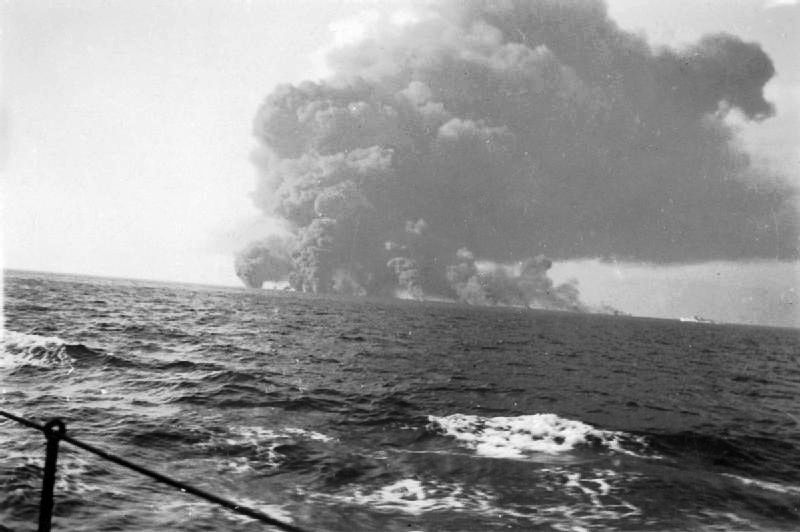
The pall of smoke from the explosion of Waimarama in 1942

By 1942 Robert was Master of the refrigerated cargo ship Waimarama. She was unusually swift for a cargo ship, capable of up to 20 knots (37 km/h), so she was selected to take part in Operation Pedestal to relieve Malta. The cargo in her holds included ammunition, and her deck cargo included containers of aviation spirit. Waimarama sailed in convoy from the Firth of Clyde via Gibraltar to the Mediterranean.

On 13 August, enemy torpedo boats and aircraft attacked the convoy. Three or four bombs dropped by a Junkers Ju 88 hit Waimarama. Within minutes she "blew up with a roar and a sheet of flame with clouds of billowing smoke". Robert Pearce was killed, along with all but two of her crew. In February 1943 he was posthumously mentioned in dispatches "For gallantry, skill and resolution while an important Convoy was fought through to Malta in the face of relentless attacks by day and night from enemy aircraft, submarines and surface forces".

== Bibliography ==
- Dorling, Henry Taprell (pseudonym Taffrail) (1973). Blue Star Line at War, 1939–45. London: W. Foulsham & Co. ISBN 0-572-00849-X.
- Lloyd's Register of British and Foreign Shipping. Vol. I–Steamers. London: Lloyd's Register of Shipping. 1906 – via Internet Archive.
- Nicol, Stuart (2001a). MacQueen's Legacy; A History of the Royal Mail Line. Vol. One. Brimscombe Port and Charleston, SC: Tempus Publishing. ISBN 0-7524-2118-2.
- Nicol, Stuart (2001b). MacQueen's Legacy; Ships of the Royal Mail Line. Vol. Two. Brimscombe Port and Charleston, SC: Tempus Publishing. ISBN 0-7524-2119-0.
