= Royal Humane Society of Australasia =

Australian charity

The Royal Humane Society of Australasia (RHSA), formerly the Victorian Humane Society, is an Australian charity dedicated to the recognition of those who risk their own lives in saving or attempting to save the lives of others. It also provides assistance to persons injured as a result of their bravery, or to their next of kin if they perished in the attempt.

We were outside the Rip when the accident took place and fully two miles off shore. Pilot McKenzie was very cool, and so was Marr who was on the mainmast. He motioned to cut it adrift so as to save the vessel, although he knew by doing so he could not be saved. We bade him good-bye and he nodded to us.

— Logbook entry, 15th July 1873

The roots of the organisation lie in an act of bravery that inspired the citizens of Melbourne, Victoria. In July 1873, the pilot schooner Rip was badly damaged in a storm off Point Nepean. Able Seaman James Marr, clinging to a broken mast in the water, urged the crew to save the ship by cutting the mast, and himself, adrift. In the wave of public commendation that followed his act of heroic sacrifice, a suggestion was made by newspaper correspondent John Wilks to form a society to recognise and reward brave acts, along the lines of the British Royal Humane Society. At a public meeting at the Melbourne Town Hall on 28 September 1874, the Victorian Humane Society was formed, with George Coppin elected its first President. The society was a great success, and within only a couple of years there were moves to extend its operations to the rest of Australia, led by the society's secretary, John Ellis Stewart.

In 1878 the society awarded its first ever gold medal. The recipient was Midshipman Thomas Pearce, who rescued passenger Eva Carmichael in the Loch Ard disaster on the Shipwreck Coast.

In 1881 Sir William Clarke donated £250 to the society, from which the Clarke Medal was created. Struck in gold or silver, it remains the society's highest honour.

In 1882 the directors of the society obtained Queen Victoria's consent to alter its name to the "Royal Humane Society of Australasia". In 1886, the society extended its operations to encompass the whole of Australia and Fiji, thus becoming the first federal institution in Australia.

The society regularly included events outside of Australia.

In the twentieth century the organization continued to distribute awards to Australian-wide events.
