= Loch Sunart (sailing ship) =

Scottish sailing ship that was wrecked on the Irish coast in 1879

Coordinates: 54°32′02″N 5°27′22″W

History

United Kingdom
- Name: Loch Sunart
- Namesake: Loch Sunart
- Owner: James Aitken
- Operator: General Shipping Co
- Port of registry: Glasgow
- Builder: A. & J. Inglis, Pointhouse
- Yard number: 135
- Launched: 19 January 1878
- Identification: UK official number 78578; code letters RDVK
- Fate: wrecked 13 January 1879

General characteristics
- Tonnage: 1,284 GRT, 1,231 NRT
- Length: 225.5 ft (68.7 m)
- Beam: 35.5 ft (10.8 m)
- Depth: 21.6 ft (6.6 m)
- Decks: 2
- Sail plan: 3 masts, square-rigged ship
- Capacity: 45 passengers
- Crew: 32

Loch Sunart was an iron-hulled sailing ship that was built in Scotland in 1878 for Loch Line's service between Great Britain and Australia. The ship was named after Loch Sunart in Lochaber.

She was wrecked off the coast of Ulster in 1879, but without loss of life. Her crew included Thomas Pearce, who had also survived the wreck of Loch Ard in Australia the previous year.

== Building ==
A. & J. Inglis built Loch Sunart at Pointhouse in Lanarkshire as yard number 135. She was launched on 19 January 1878. Her registered length was 225.5 ft (68.7 m), her beam was 35.8 ft (10.9 m) and her depth was 21.6 ft (6.6 m). Her tonnages were 1,284 GRT and 1,231 NRT. She had three masts and was a full-rigged ship.

Loch Sunart's principal owner was James Aitken, a member of one of the families that owned the Loch Line. Her manager was the General Shipping Company, which was part of Loch Line. She was registered in Glasgow. Her UK official number was 78578 and her code letters were RDVK.

== Career ==
In 1878 Loch Sunart made one voyage to Australia and back.

In January 1879 she left Glasgow for Melbourne. Her Master was Captain Gavin Weir. She was carrying emigrants as passengers, and a cargo of spirits, linen, iron railings, coal, machinery, and gunpowder. On 13 January she grounded on Skullmartin Rock in Ballywalter Bay, on the coast of the Ards Peninsula, County Down.

All of Loch Sunart's 45 passengers and 32 crew were rescued. They included apprentice Thomas Pearce, who had survived the wreck of Loch Ard only seven months earlier. Most of her cargo was salved but tugs failed to free the ship, and on 18 February she was given up as a total loss.

== Bibliography ==
- Lloyd's Register of British and Foreign Shipping. London: Lloyd's Register of Shipping. 1878 – via Internet Archive.
- Mercantile Navy List. London. 1879 – via Crew List Index Project.
