= Eddystone Point =

Point in Tasmania, Australia

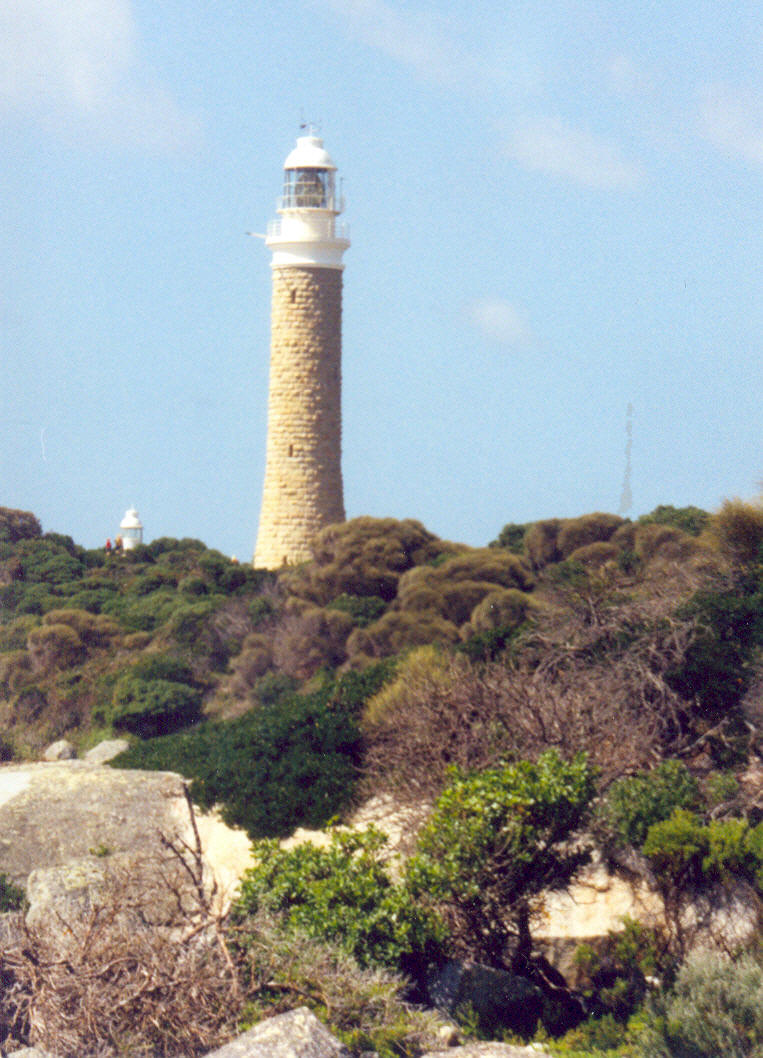
Eddystone Point Lighthouse

Eddystone Point lies on the north-east coast of Tasmania, Australia at 40.994 S/148.349 E.

== History ==
The first European to sight Eddystone Point was the Dutch navigator, Abel Tasman. In December 1642, Tasman sailed along the entire east coast of Van Diemen's Land (Tasmania). He recorded that he tried to follow the coast around this headland, but he could not penetrate the wind wall. The howling westerly gale indicated that here was a strait, not a bay, so Tasman resumed his easterly course to continue his continent-hunting.

The next European visitor was Tobias Furneaux in HMS Adventure during James Cook's second Pacific voyage, which took place during the period of intense Anglo-French rivalry that filled the twelve years between the Seven Years' War and the American Revolutionary War. In March 1773, Furneaux retraced Tasman's course up the east coast of the island to discover whether or not it was joined to New Holland. At 2 a.m. on 19 March, his ship was suddenly tossed 40 miles out to sea and lost its sails. Furneaux named the headland Eddystone Point, after the notorious Eddystone Rocks in the English Channel.

Seal hunting took place here from at least 1827.

Six applications were made to the colonial government to lease land for whaling stations at Eddystone Point in 1841. It is uncertain how many of these leases were taken up.

== Eddystone Point Lighthouse ==
In 1884, the adjacent colonies of Tasmania and Victoria were discussing the erection of a lighthouse at Eddystone Point, which was eventually built in 1889. The lighthouse and keepers' cottages are made of granite, quarried from nearby. Head of works and head mason was James Galloway from Glasgow, Scotland, who migrated to Tasmania to oversee the building program. His brother, Alexander Galloway, also migrated from Glasgow to work on the building of the lighthouse and cottages.

In the early 1920s, heavy storms damaged the buildings, jetties and equipment, and flooded the tower.

In 1935, wireless communication was installed.

In 1960, the First Order Chance Brothers lens that had been removed from the Cape du Couedic Lighthouse on Kangaroo Island in South Australia was shipped to Melbourne for installation at Eddystone Point Lighthouse.

== Geography ==
=== Climate ===
Larapuna experiences an oceanic climate (Köppen: Cfb) with mild, windy conditions year-round. On average, Larapuna only has 47.6 clear days whilst having 142.4 cloudy days per annum. The wettest recorded day was 22 April 1960 with 210.6 mm (8.29 in) of rainfall. Extreme temperatures ranged from 38.2 °C (100.8 °F) on 19 January 2018 to −4.4 °C (24.1 °F) on 6 August 1929.

Climate data for Larapuna (Eddystone Point) (40.99°S 148.35°E) (20 m (66 ft) AMSL) (1908-2025)
| Month | Jan | Feb | Mar | Apr | May | Jun | Jul | Aug | Sep | Oct | Nov | Dec | Year |
|---|---|---|---|---|---|---|---|---|---|---|---|---|---|
| Record high °C (°F) | 38.2 (100.8) | 34.7 (94.5) | 34.1 (93.4) | 26.5 (79.7) | 23.3 (73.9) | 19.4 (66.9) | 19.0 (66.2) | 19.4 (66.9) | 26.7 (80.1) | 28.8 (83.8) | 32.8 (91.0) | 35.0 (95.0) | 38.2 (100.8) |
| Mean daily maximum °C (°F) | 20.9 (69.6) | 21.1 (70.0) | 20.2 (68.4) | 18.0 (64.4) | 15.6 (60.1) | 13.6 (56.5) | 13.1 (55.6) | 13.6 (56.5) | 14.9 (58.8) | 16.3 (61.3) | 17.9 (64.2) | 19.4 (66.9) | 17.1 (62.7) |
| Mean daily minimum °C (°F) | 13.3 (55.9) | 14.0 (57.2) | 13.1 (55.6) | 11.1 (52.0) | 9.4 (48.9) | 7.8 (46.0) | 6.9 (44.4) | 7.0 (44.6) | 7.9 (46.2) | 9.0 (48.2) | 10.5 (50.9) | 12.1 (53.8) | 10.2 (50.3) |
| Record low °C (°F) | 4.6 (40.3) | 4.4 (39.9) | 2.5 (36.5) | 1.7 (35.1) | 0.6 (33.1) | −0.4 (31.3) | −1.1 (30.0) | −4.4 (24.1) | 0.0 (32.0) | 0.7 (33.3) | 2.0 (35.6) | 4.2 (39.6) | −4.4 (24.1) |
| Average precipitation mm (inches) | 45.0 (1.77) | 45.9 (1.81) | 58.6 (2.31) | 63.3 (2.49) | 64.1 (2.52) | 73.5 (2.89) | 73.3 (2.89) | 69.4 (2.73) | 62.7 (2.47) | 67.8 (2.67) | 60.6 (2.39) | 59.5 (2.34) | 744.1 (29.30) |
| Average precipitation days (≥ 0.2 mm) | 9.3 | 8.8 | 10.8 | 12.8 | 14.7 | 16.1 | 16.8 | 16.7 | 14.9 | 14.1 | 12.0 | 11.4 | 158.4 |
| Average afternoon relative humidity (%) | 68 | 69 | 69 | 69 | 73 | 75 | 75 | 72 | 71 | 70 | 70 | 69 | 71 |
| Average dew point °C (°F) | 12.7 (54.9) | 13.4 (56.1) | 12.6 (54.7) | 10.7 (51.3) | 9.6 (49.3) | 8.2 (46.8) | 7.5 (45.5) | 7.2 (45.0) | 7.9 (46.2) | 8.9 (48.0) | 10.3 (50.5) | 11.6 (52.9) | 10.1 (50.1) |
Source: Bureau of Meteorology (1908-2025)
