= Loch Vennachar =

Scottish sailing ship that was wrecked off South Australia in 1905

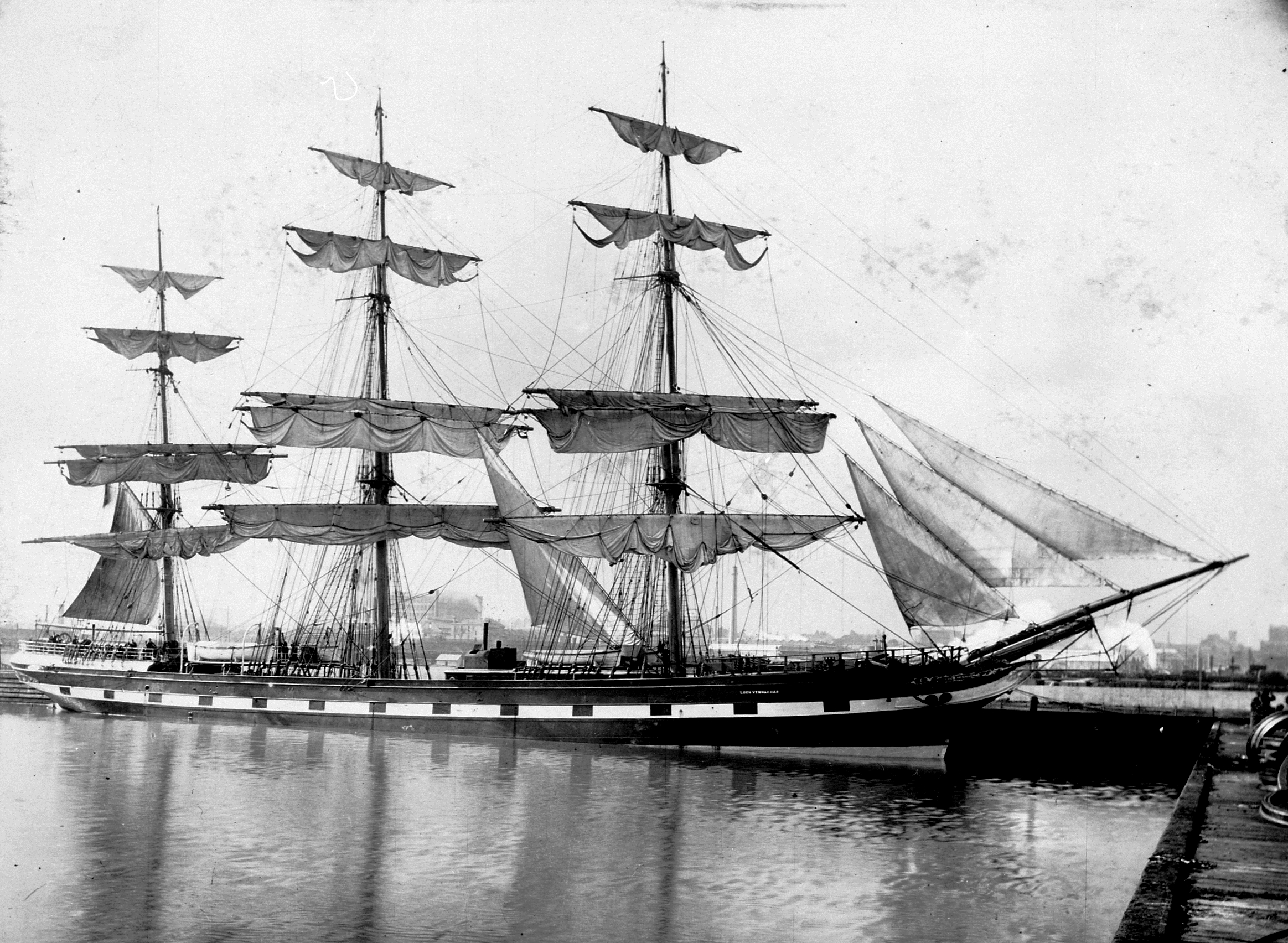
- Loch Vennachar in port

History

United Kingdom
- Name: Loch Vennachar
- Namesake: Loch Venachar
- Owner: 1875: Aitken & Lilburn; 1884: John P Kidston & others; 1888: George J Kidston & others; 1894: John P Kidston & others
- Operator: Glasgow Shipping Co
- Port of registry: Glasgow
- Builder: J&G Thomson, Dalmuir
- Launched: 4 August 1875
- Maiden voyage: 9 September 1875
- Identification: UK official number 71748; code letters PCVQ
- Fate: sank September 1905

General characteristics
- Type: clipper
- Tonnage: 1,557 GRT, 1,485 NRT
- Length: 250.1 ft (76.2 m)
- Beam: 38.3 ft (11.7 m)
- Depth of hold: 22.4 ft (6.8 m)
- Sail plan: 3-masted square-rigged ship
- Speed: 15 knots (28 km/h)
- Notes: sister ship: Loch Garry

Loch Vennachar was an iron-hulled, three-masted clipper ship that was built in Scotland in 1875 and lost with all hands off the coast of South Australia in 1905. She spent her entire career with the Glasgow Shipping Company, trading between Britain and Australia. The company was familiarly called the "Loch Line", as all of its ships were named after Scottish lochs. The ship was named after Loch Venachar, in what was then Perthshire.

In 1892 Loch Vennachar survived being dismasted by a cyclone in the Indian Ocean. In 1901 she was sunk when a steamship ran her down when at anchor in the Thames Estuary. She was raised, repaired and returned to service. In 1905 she sank again off Kangaroo Island.

In 1976 marine archaeologists found Loch Vennachar's wreck just off West Bay, Kangaroo Island. The Commonwealth Historic Shipwrecks Act 1976 protects the wreck. Parts of one of her anchors were recovered in 1980 and are now preserved on Kangaroo Island.

== Building ==
James and George Thomson built Loch Vennachar at Dalmuir on the River Clyde, launching her on 4 August 1875. Her registered length was 250.1 ft (76.2 m), her beam was 38.3 ft (11.7 m) and the depth of her hold was 22.4 ft (6.8 m). Her tonnages were 1,557 GRT and 1,485 NRT.

The Glasgow Shipping Company registered Loch Vennachar at Glasgow. Her UK official number was 71748 and her code letters were PCVQ.

The ship was first rigged with fidded royal masts, but this proved to interfere with her stability as there was too much weight aloft. She was then given topgallant and royal masts in one with crossed royal yards over double-topgallants.

== Career ==
Loch Vennachar was always in the wool trade from Adelaide and Melbourne to Britain. Her usual cargo was usually about 5,500 bales of wool. On voyages from Britain to Australia she carried other cargo, and also passengers. When sailing from Melbourne, her wool cargoes were organised by John Sanderson & Co. A book about the firm includes a painting of the ship off Port Phillip Heads.

Captain Francis Wagstaff commanded her on her maiden voyage, leaving Inishtrahull on 6 September 1875. Captain William Robertson succeeded him early in 1876, but died in 1878 after making two voyages in her. Her First Officer, James S Ozanne, was promoted to captain, and commanded her until 1884. He was succeeded by Captain William H Bennett, who retired in 1904. Captain William S Hawkins commanded her on her final voyage in 1905.

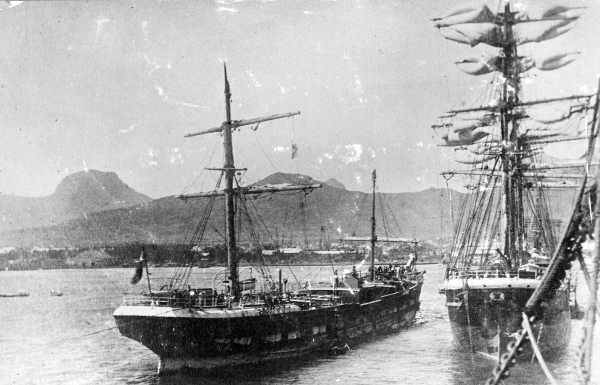
Loch Vennachar at Port Louis in 1892, showing cyclone damage

In June 1892 a cyclone dismasted the ship in the Indian Ocean. At about 8pm on 3 June, the barometer shoews a fall in pressure. Loch Vennachar's crew promptly shortened her sail. At dawn, about 5am, terrific head seas driven by a northeast gale hit the ship. Two large waves hit her. She rode the first and sank into the trough beyond. The second wave broke over her deck, breaking all three of her masts. With little left of her masts to steady her, the ship rolled dangerously in heavy seas.

After nine days, the weather eased and her crew rigged a spar forward and sail on the damaged mizzen mast. After five weeks she reached Port Louis, Mauritius. She waited there for five months for new spars. When they arrived from England, she was repaired in ten days. The repairs cost £9,071. She left Port Louis in 18 November and reached Port Phillip on 22 December. Lloyd's of London awarded Captain Bennett its Lloyd's Medal for Saving Life at Sea.

On 12 November 1901 Loch Vennachar was anchored in the Thames Estuary off Thameshaven in Essex when at about 4.15am the steamship Cato collided with her starboard bow. Loch Vennachar sank and one seaman suffered a critical head injury, but the crew launched her boats and all 30 members of her crew were saved. Six of her seven ship's cats were lost. She was raised on 9 December, repaired at a cost of £17,000, and returned to service.

== Final voyage ==
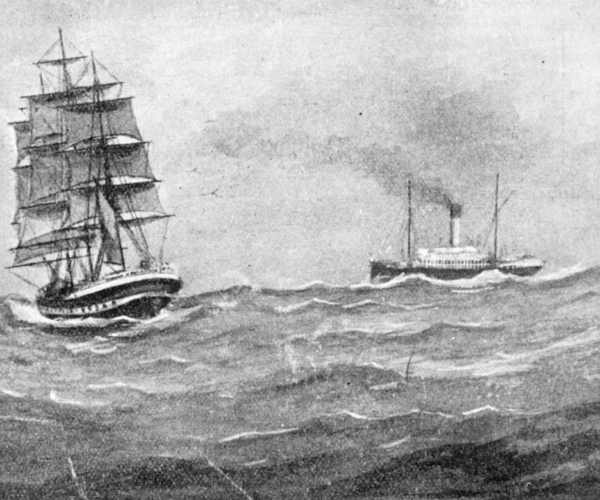
Artist's impression of Loch Vennachar (left) being sighted by Yongala (right)

Late in June 1905 Loch Vennachar left Glasgow for Adelaide, carrying a general cargo including 20,000 bricks. On 6 September 1905 Yongala overtook her about 160 nautical miles (300 km) west of the Neptune Islands and the captains exchanged "all's well" signals. Yongala's captain recorded that Loch Vennachar made a pretty sight, speeding along with her sails in full standing. It was the last known sighting of Loch Vennachar.

On 29 September, the ketch Annie Watt arrived in Adelaide and her captain reported picking up a reel of blue printing paper 18 miles northwest of Kangaroo Island. The paper was identified as part of Loch Vennachar's cargo. Three weeks later, the sea began delivering scraps of her cargo to the rocky coast of Kangaroo Island, which confirmed her loss. Twice the steamship Governor Musgrave was sent to search for the wreck and any survivors. Weeks of searching by government and local fishing boats produced only flotsam and the body of a young seaman, who was never identified. He was buried in the sand hills of West Bay. The search was eventually abandoned on 12 October.

At the time, it was incorrectly concluded that Loch Vennachar was wrecked on Young Rocks, a granite outcrop about 20 miles south-southwest of Cape Gantheaume, trying to make the Backstairs Passage.

== Crew on final voyage ==
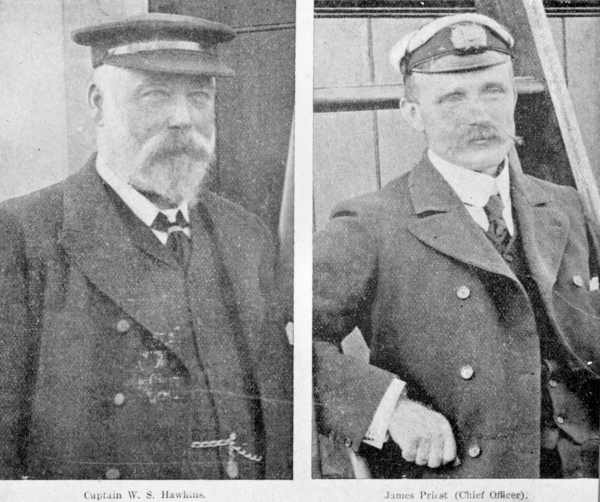
Captain William Hawkins and Chief Officer James Priest

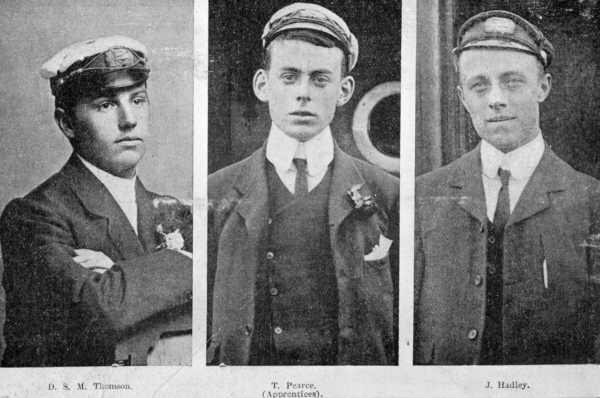
From left: D.S.M. Thomson*, Thomas Pearce (apprentice) and Joseph Hadley

The first list of people likely to be on the ship at the time of her loss appeared in newspapers late in September 1905. This list, containing 23 names of people who could be either crew or passengers, was compiled from letters waiting for collection by the ship at the offices of George Wills & Co, the ship's agent in Adelaide. A later newspaper article advised that apprentices S.C. Brown and Robert Andrews, whose names had been included in the earlier list, had transferred from Loch Vennachar to Loch Garry and Loch Torridon respectively. Late in November 1905, the following list was published in a number of newspapers in Australia, New Zealand and Scotland. This list which "was received at Fremantle by the English mail" indicates that there were no passengers on the last voyage. In the list, the abbreviations A.B. and O.S. refer respectively to able seaman and ordinary seaman.

- William S. Hawkins, master, Glasgow
- James Priest, mate, North Shields
- Charles Radcliffe, second mate, USA
- Fred. W. Lake, third mate, Melbourne
- James Reid, carpenter, Dumbarton
- W. Molseed, steward, Greenock
- W. McLean, cook, Glasgow
- R. Simpson, sailmaker, Greenock
- Eugen Broberg, A.B., Stockholm
- Donald Mathieson, A.B., Skye
- A. Anderson, A.B., Kragero
- E: McEwan, A.B., Greenock
- Thomas Anderson, A.B., Arandel
- Hugh Humphreys, A.B., Portmadoc
- Alexander Dunlop, A.B., Rothesay
- M. Jenson, A.B., Aarhus
- David Hanson, A.B., Bergen
- E. Holden, A.B., Newark, N.J.
- John Bickle, A.B., Edinburgh
- William Barry, A.B., Adelaide
- Edward McPhie, O.S., Morven
- William Turnbull, O.S., Grangemouth
- William Martin, O.S., Glasgow
- Joseph W. Hadley, apprentice, Wivenhoe
- Thomas W. Pearce, apprentice, Southampton
- D.S.B. Thomson*, apprentice, Melbourne
- Horace Eastwood, apprentice, Knottingley

The death of Thomas Pearce received attention in the Australian press because his father, Thomas R Pearce, was well known as one of two survivors of the Loch Ard wreck in 1878, and his step-grandfather, Captain Robert Pearce, died in command of SS Gothenburg when she was lost in 1875.

== Cape du Couedic Lighthouse ==
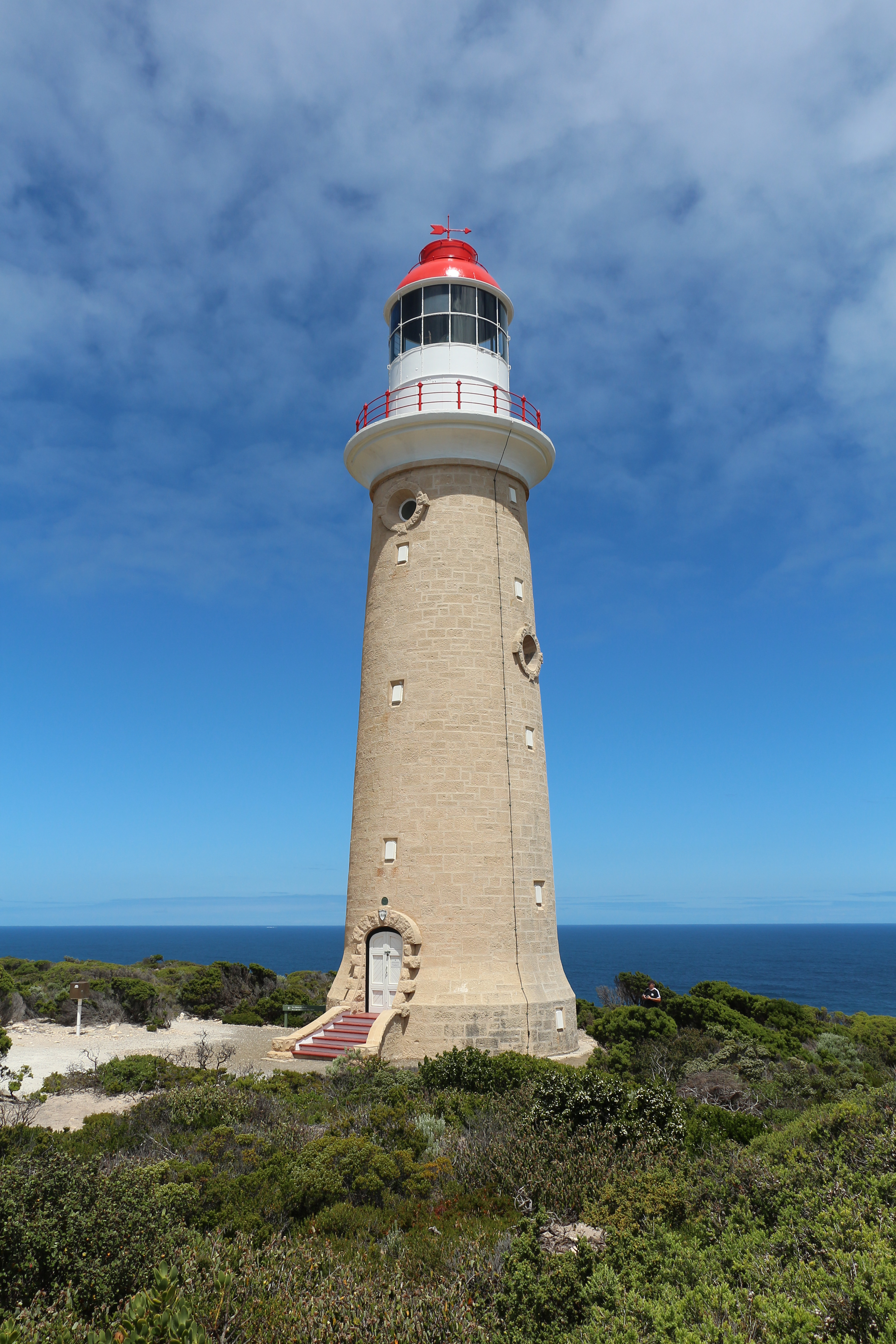
Cape du Couedic Lighthouse

The loss of Loch Vennachar followed that of Loch Sloy in 1899. In 1902 the Marine Board of South Australia had recommended building a lignthouse on Cape du Couedic, but this was not done. The Board considered that such a lighthouse could have prevented the loss of both ships. Building began in 1907 and Cape du Couedic Lighthouse was officially lit on 27 June 1909. In 1908 the northern headland of West Bay was named Vennachar Point in the memory of the ship.

== Discovery ==
In February 1976 the Society for Underwater Historical Research (SUHR) searched for the wreck off the west coast of Kangaroo Island. On 24 February conditions were unsuitable for an underwater search, so the shore was searched at the foot of cliffs just north of West Bay. A brick with the letters "GLAS...OW" on one face was found.

On 26 February conditions were suitable for scuba diving, so three SUHR divers and two local divers searched the sea where the brick was found. They found the wreck at a depth of 12 metres (39 ft). All of her anchors were still in place, which suggested that no attempt had been made to prevent her from hitting the cliff.

== Expedition ==
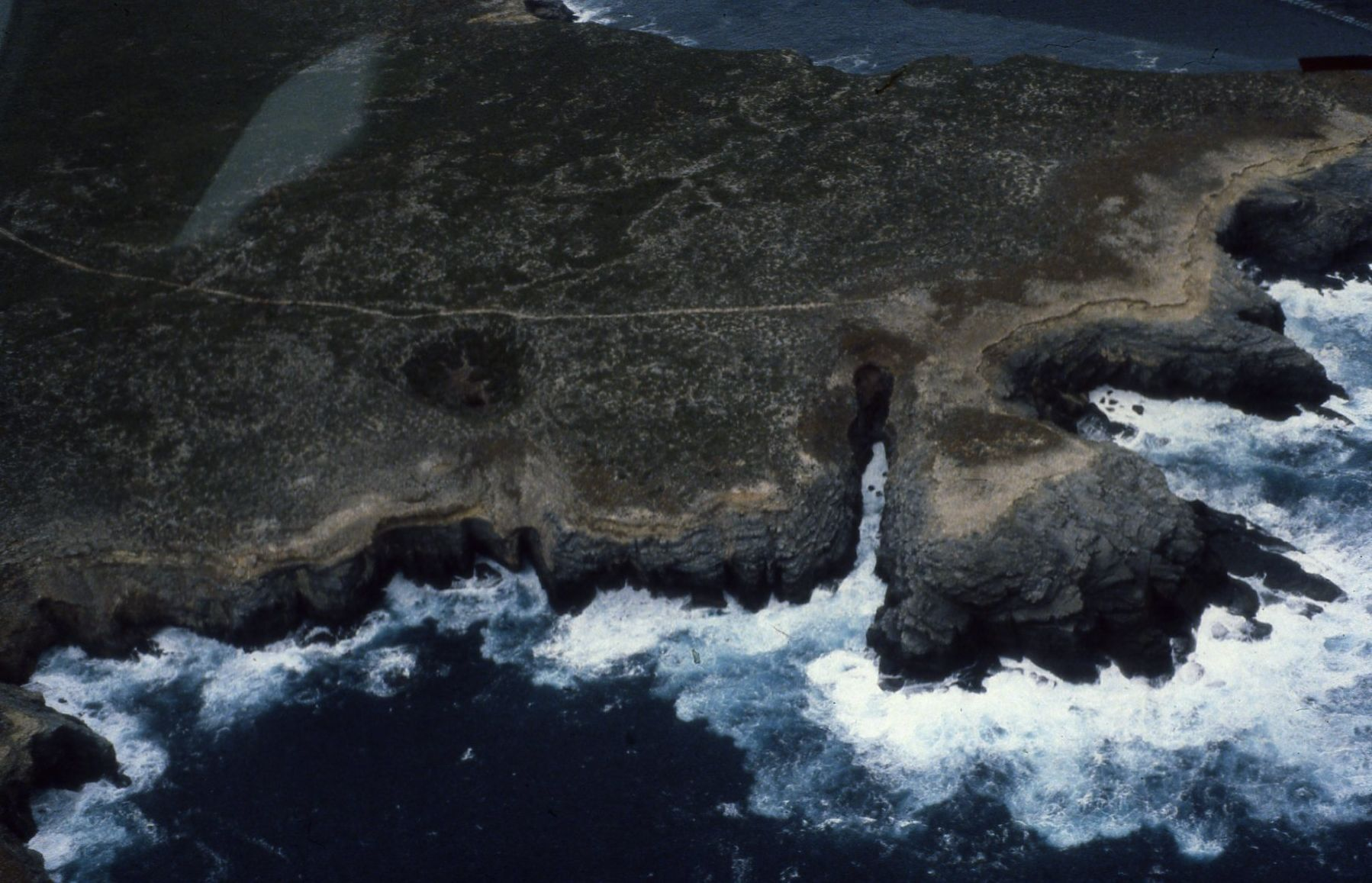
Aerial view of the wreck site on Kangaroo Island

After lobbying by the SUHR, the Premier of South Australia, Don Dunstan, announced on 11 December 1976 that the SUHR would mount an expedition in February 1977 to study the site, for which the state government would provide ten police divers, special leave for government employees involved with the expedition, and concessional fares on the government-owned ferry, Troubridge. He also declared the area of the wreck site a historic reserve under South Australia's Aboriginal and Historic Relics Preservation Act 1965.

In February 1977, a team of 34 people set up camp at West Bay for a stay of two weeks. Due to unsuitable diving conditions, the first week was spent diving on the Fides shipwreck on the north coast of Kangaroo Island. The second week was spent at the Loch Vennachar wreck. The SUHR established the location of the wreck site in relation to the land, surveyed the wreck's bow and found its main anchors, photographically recorded the site and recovered a selection of artefacts for conservation. The expedition was funded by member contributions plus the donation of services, goods and cash from four government agencies, 35 private businesses and numerous individuals.

The expedition's report recommended conserving one of the bower anchors. This was done in 1980. The SUHR collaborated with the state government and the Kangaroo Island Scuba Club, assisted by 23 government agencies, private organisations and individuals. On 31 March an anchor shank was recovered from the wreck, followed by its stock the next day. Both parts were stored in the water of West Bay until the fishing boat Lady Buick transferred them to Kingscote in April and May 1980 respectively. They were then taken to Port Adelaide; the shank on Troubridge and the stock on HMAS Banks.

Amdel in Adelaide conserved the anchor. It was returned to Kangaroo Island where it was put on display at the Flinders Chase Homestead in the Flinders Chase National Park, with a formal ceremony on 26 March 1982 attended by David Wotton, the SA Minister of Environment and Planning.

== Present day ==
The wreck site has been protected by the Commonwealth Historic Shipwrecks Act 1976 since October 1980. Its location is officially recorded as 35°52′48″S 136°31′12″E. In 1980 the area protected as a historic reserve declared under the Aboriginal and Historic Relics Preservation Act 1965 was listed on the then Register of the National Estate. The grave of the unidentified seafarer remains at West Bay, but with a replica wooden cross as the original one made from spars from the wreckage was vandalised in the 1970s. By 2006 the bower anchor had been moved from the Flinders Chase Homestead to a site next to the visitors' car park on the south side of West Bay.

== See also ==
- List of clipper ships
- List of shipwrecks of Australia
- List of disasters in Australia by death toll
