= Cape du Couedic Lighthouse =

Lighthouse in South Australia

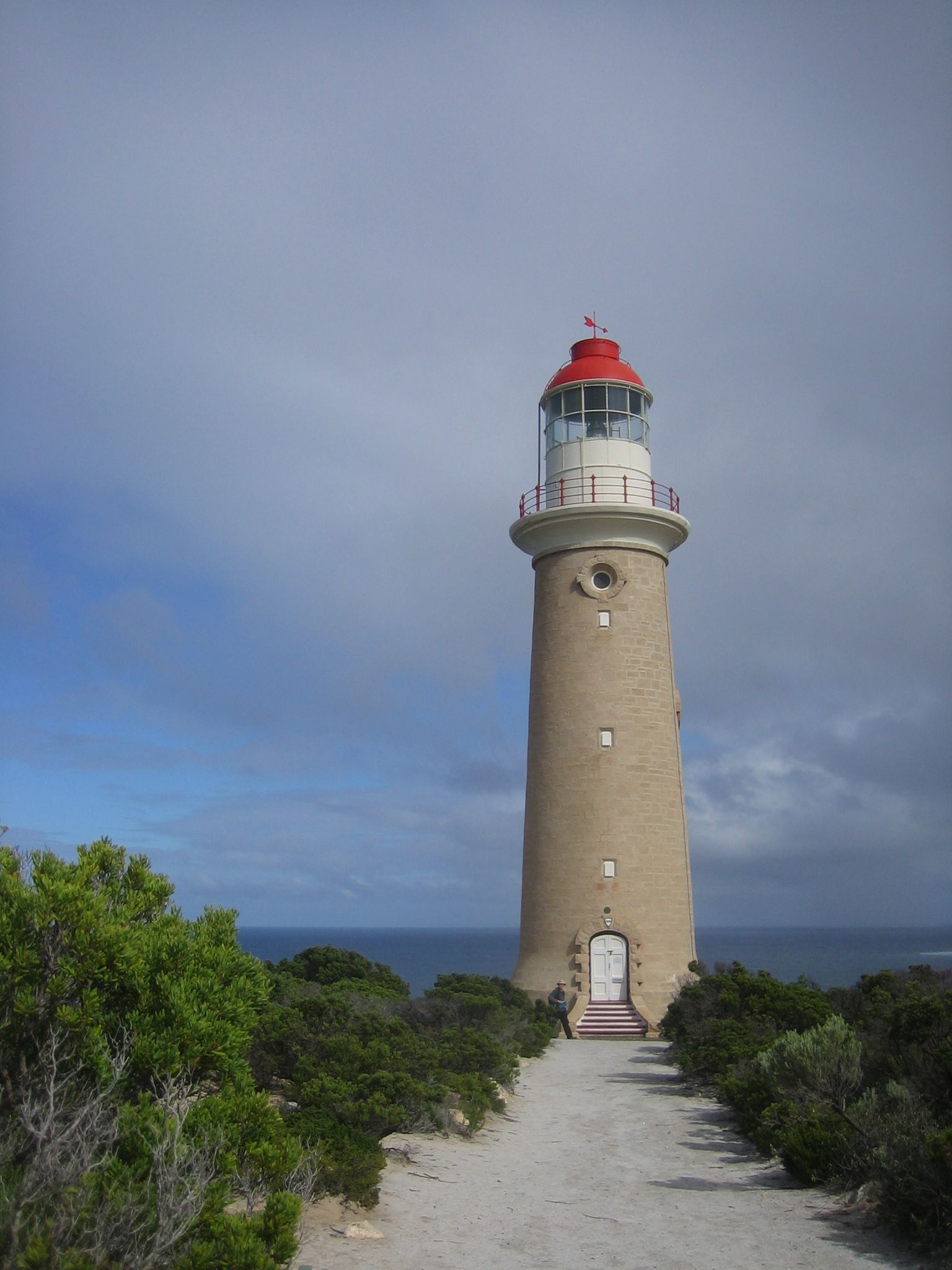
- Cape du Couedic Lighthouse
- Location: Flinders Chase, Kangaroo Island; South Australia; Australia
- Coordinates: 36°03′34″S 136°42′14″E

Tower
- Constructed: 1909
- Construction: sandstone tower
- Automated: 1957
- Height: 25 metres (82 ft)
- Shape: conical tower with balcony and lantern
- Markings: unpainted sandstone tower, white lantern room, red lantern dome and rail balcony
- Power source: mains electricity
- Operator: Australian Maritime Safety Authority
- Heritage: state heritage place since 24 July 1980

Light
- First lit: 1909
- Focal height: 103 metres (338 ft)
- Lens: Chance Brothers Fresnel lens
- Intensity: 38,000 cd
- Range: 17 nautical miles (31 km)
- Characteristic: Fl (2) 10s.

The Cape du Couedic Lighthouse is a lighthouse in South Australia located at Cape du Couedic on Kangaroo Island.

== History ==
Before construction could begin, a jetty was built in Weirs Cove, 1 mi (1.6 km) north of the lighthouse, and a flying fox erected to haul the materials up the 85 m (279 ft) cliff. Construction of the lighthouse started in 1906 completed in 1909, the fifteenth positioned on the South Australian coast. The tower and keepers' cottages were constructed from 2000 pieces of local stone. The three four-roomed cottages were built to house the head lighthouse keeper and two assistants with their families, and there were also stables and outbuildings. The lighthouse was fitted with a Chance Brothers lantern and First Order lens, powered by kerosene.

In 1915, the Commonwealth Government assumed control of all Australian lighthouses, but the takeover of Cape du Couedic did not occur until 1917.

The first motor vehicle visited the lighthouse in 1940, although there was no proper road; up until this point, supplies were delivered to the jetty at Weirs Cove by boat once every three months.

Czech-born surrealist artist Voitre Marek, who had migrated to Adelaide in 1949, spent some time with his wife and young children as lighthouse keeper at Cape du Couedic from 1956, afterwards moving to Troubridge Island Lighthouse for a few years.

By the 1950s, shipping around Cape du Couedic had decreased significantly, with most vessels using the Backstairs Passage and Investigator Strait, so Cape du Couedic was automated in 1957, no longer requiring keepers. The First Order lens, complete with mercury float pedestal, was removed and replaced by a Third Order fixed lens, lit by acetylene gas. The cottages were transferred to the South Australian Government and incorporated into the Flinders Chase National Park.

The original lens was shipped to Melbourne for installation at Eddystone Point Lighthouse in Tasmania in 1960.

In 1974 the site was converted to mains power operation.

The lighthouse was heritage-listed on the SA Heritage Register on 24 July 1980.

In 1991 restoration work on the three lighthouse-keeper's houses was undertaken, after which they became available for holiday rentals. In 2000 further work was carried out, including the replacing the roofs with slate roofs, true to the original.

== Description ==
The lighthouse is located within the Flinders Chase National Park, south of Rocky River on the south-western point of Kangaroo Island. It is accessible by road.

The lighthouse tower is 25 m (82 ft) high. The light characteristic shows two flashes every ten seconds, emitted at a focal plane height of 103 metres (338 ft). A Third Order Fresnel lens made by Chance Brothers, with a low voltage lamp and six-position lamp changer, is as of 2021 in operation.

The original buildings are intact and preserved, and visitors to the area can stay in the three keepers' cottages, while the lighthouse is a museum. The lighthouse, its former keepers' cottages, stable and store, and the jetty, funnelway and the ruins of a store at Weirs Cove, have separate listings on the SA Heritage Register, while the tower and cottages are also listed on the National Heritage List.

== See also ==
- List of lighthouses in Australia
- Loch Vennachar
