= Loch Earn (ship) =

British three-masted full-rigged ship

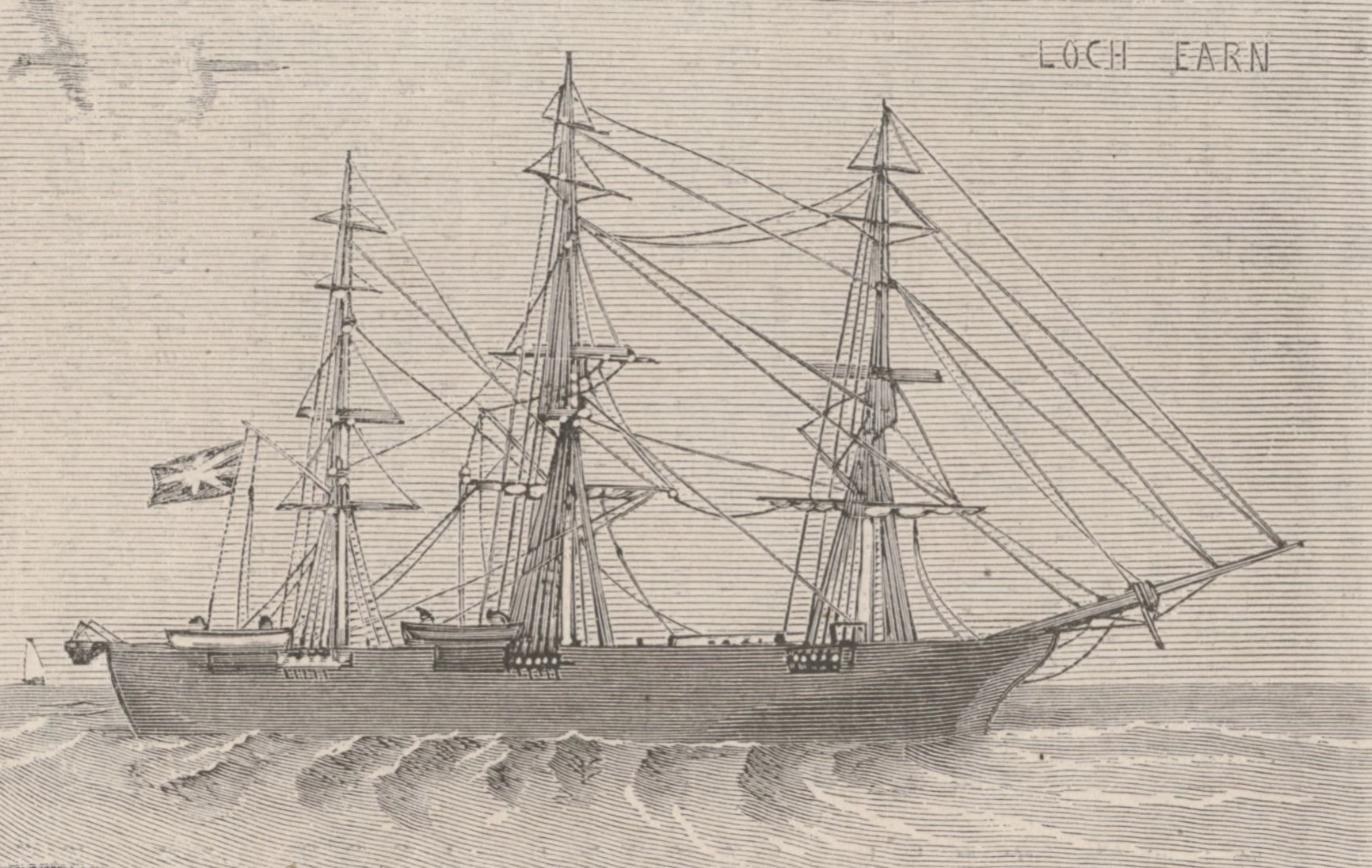
- Drawing of Loch Earn in 1873.

History
- Name: Loch Earn
- Owner: Loch Line
- Builder: Lawrie J. G. & Co.
- Yard number: 40
- Launched: 23 August 1869
- Completed: 1869
- Acquired: 1869
- In service: 15 December 1869
- Out of service: 28 November 1873
- Identification: Official number: 60470
- Fate: Sank after a collision on 28 November 1873.

General characteristics
- Type: Full-rigged ship
- Tonnage: 1,200 GRT
- Length: 68.9 m (226 ft 1 in)
- Beam: 10.9 m (35 ft 9 in)
- Depth: 6.6 m (21 ft 8 in)
- Decks: 1
- Sail plan: Full-rigged ship
- Notes: 3 masts

Loch Earn was a British three-masted full-rigged ship that was on a voyage from London, England to New York City, United States when she collided with SS Ville du Havre in the Atlantic Ocean (47°21′N 35°31′W) on 22 November 1873. Ville du Havre sank with the loss of 226 of her 313 passengers and crew, while heavily damaged Loch Earn remained afloat before finally sinking after being abandoned by her crew on 28 November 1873 with no loss of life.

== Construction ==
Loch Earn was built at the Lawrie J. G. & Co. shipyard in Glasgow, Scotland, United Kingdom. She was launched on 23 August 1869 and completed that same year. The ship was 68.9 metres (226 ft 1 in) long, had a beam of 10.9 metres (35 ft 9 in) and had a depth of 6.6 metres (21 ft 8 in). She was assessed at 1,200 gross register tons (GRT) and had three masts.

== Collision and sinking ==
Loch Earn departed London, England for New York City, United States under the command of Captain William Robertson, with 85 passengers and crew on board. By 22 November 1873, the ship was already halfway across the Atlantic when Captain Robertson spotted the lights of another ship around 2 am. Due to the clear night with little wind but heavy seas, the other ship's lookouts (Ville du Havre bound from New York to Le Havre, Seine-Inférieure under the command of Captain Marino Surmonte) had likewise spotted the Loch Earn, but second officer Endurand, who was in charge of the Ville du Havre that night, believed the Loch Earn to be at a safe enough distance to clear the approaching vessel. Under the law of the sea at the time, it was customary for steam to give way to sail. However, the Ville du Havre steamed and sailed onwards at a speed of about 12 knots (22 km/h; 14 mph) and swung across the bow of the Loch Earn.

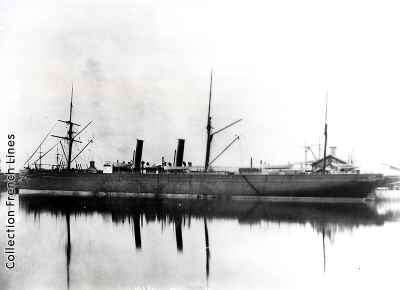
Photograph of Ville du Havre.

Captain Robertson observed the Ville du Havre approaching dangerously close, and rang the ship's bell before turning the helm hard to starboard in an effort to avoid a collision. Loch Earn struck the Ville du Havre amidships at (47°21′N 35°31′W), 15 minutes after the ships had already spotted each other. Ville du Havre shook violently during the collision as the bow of the Loch Earn tore open the ship's side for a distance of 9 m (30 ft) and penetrated her 3.6 m (12 ft) deep, almost opposite the engines. Ville du Havre was nearly split in half by the impact before the Loch Earn dislodged herself from the ship and floated away from the stricken vessel. After one mile (1.6 km) the ship came to a stop, and her captain ordered her four lifeboats to be swung out and lowered to pick up any survivors from the water.

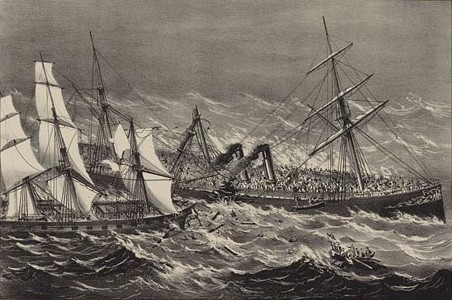
Collision between Loch Earn and Ville du Havre.

Meanwhile, chaos descended onto the decks of the Ville du Havre as the ship started rapidly sinking. The sleeping passengers had been awakened by the noise of the collision and were now on deck trying to reach one of the ship's lifeboats. However, about five minutes into the sinking, the ship's masts collapsed and crushed two lifeboats, killing and wounding several people. Another lifeboat managed to get away unscathed, and rowed towards the Loch Earn, dropping of a load of survivors before returning to find more people struggling in the water. Some swimmers managed to reach the Loch Earn and were hauled aboard by a rope. Captain Sarmont was also rescued from the water. Within 12 minutes of the collision, Ville du Havre sank, but not before splitting in half as she went down.

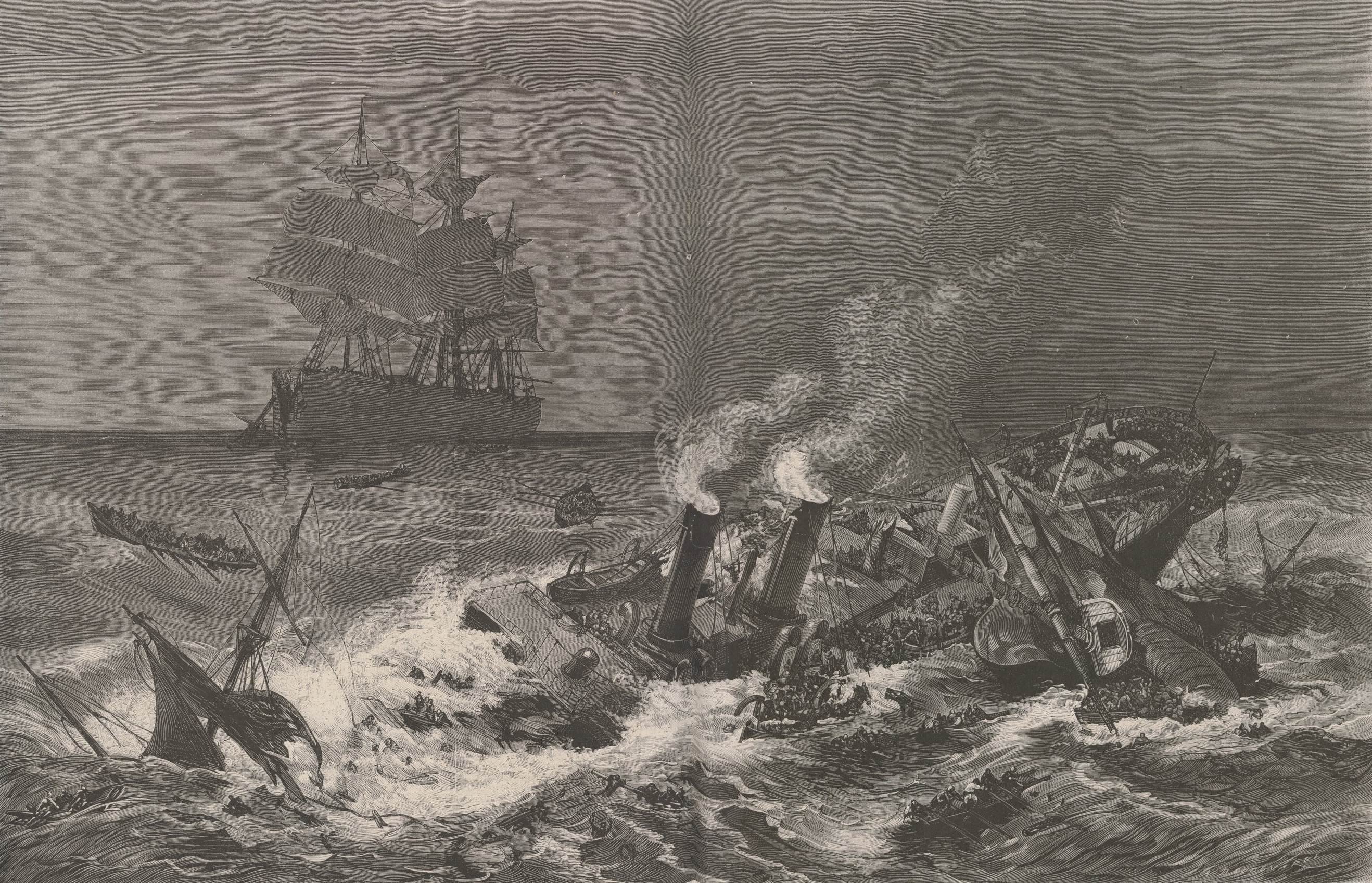
Illustration of the sinking of Ville du Havre with the damaged Loch Earn in the background.

Despite the cold water, survivors were found as much as two hours after the collision. The lifeboats kept searching for survivors until 10 am. In total 87 survivors (26 passengers and 61 crew) were saved from the Ville du Havre and were brought safely on board the Loch Earn. However, the ship herself was badly damaged with her bow smashed in, and of risk of sinking herself. The American cargo ship Tremountain, en route from Bristol, United Kingdom to New York, spotted the stricken Loch Earn at 7 am and the survivors alongside her own 85 passengers and crew were transferred to the Tremountain. Before setting sail to the UK with the survivors, the ship searched the wreck site one last time for any survivors until nightfall. Tremountain reached Cardiff, Wales, United Kingdom on the morning of 1 December 1873 where she unloaded the 87 survivors of the Ville du Havre. In total 226 people died in the collision, all were passengers and crew of the Ville du Havre.

Despite her fragile state, Loch Earn tried to reach Queenstown, Ireland by 29 November 1873. However, her bulkheads gave way and she started to sink. The ship was successfully evacuated before she sank on 28 November 1873. The Board of Trade commenced an inquiry into the disaster which ended on 28 December 1873, in which the court unanimously decided that the officers of the Loch Earn were not responsible for the unfortunate events.
