= Loch Line =

Former shipping line between Britain and colonial Australia (1867-1911)

The Loch Line of Glasgow, Scotland, was a group of colonial clippers managed by Messrs William Aitken and James Lilburn. They plied between the United Kingdom and Australia from 1867 to 1911.

== History ==
House flag of the Glasgow Shipping Company

House flag of the General Shipping Company

In the late 1860s, Messrs Aitken and Lilburn formed the Glasgow Shipping Company with six 1,200-ton iron sailing clippers. In 1873 a second company, the General Shipping Company, was formed with a different group of investors, but also managed by Aitken and Lilburn. Originally, the Glasgow Shipping Company was intended to serve Adelaide and Melbourne and the General Shipping Company to serve Sydney, but over time the two companies merged and were only distinguished for shareholding purposes. The merged companies rapidly grew and became commonly and officially known as the Loch Line. The Loch Line fleet grew to 25 ships.

At first, it had been intended to name the ships after clans, but the Clan Line registered the name first. As a consequence, the decision was made to name the fleet after Lochs in Scotland. A keen yachtsman, and one-time Commodore of the Royal Northern Yacht Club, James Lilburn was a man who thoroughly understood ships, but loved them for their own sake. It was under such owners that sailors considered themselves lucky to serve.

The usual route was to load general cargo and passengers at Glasgow and then sail to Adelaide. They then sailed on to Melbourne or Sydney where they loaded wool or grain, generally for London. The company never changed to steamships but persisted with sail, and from 1900 consistently ran at a financial loss. Passengers generally preferred the speed and comfort of steamers and also as a consequence, freight rates dropped. The ships usually managed one round voyage to Australia per year, and half of this time was unprofitably spent in port, loading, unloading or waiting for cargos. Experimental homeward voyages via San Francisco, South Africa and New Caledonia also proved unprofitable, and the service finally closed in 1911. The remaining six ships were sold.

== Reputation ==
The Loch Line had a reputation of misfortune, as it lost several vessels. Seventeen vessels bearing the Loch name sank in accidents, disappeared, were wrecked or torpedoed in oceans and ports around the globe. Of the 25 ships in the Loch Line fleet, only five remained and were sold off when the company finally closed in 1911.

== Fleet ==
Vessel	Built	Fate	Photo
Loch Ard	1873	Three masted ship. She was wrecked on 1 June 1878 near Curdies Inlet on the Victorian coastline, 27 miles (43 km) west from Cape Otway on voyage from London to Melbourne. Only two of the 54 passengers and crew aboard survived.	Loch Ard
Loch Broom	1885	Four masted barque sold in 1912 to Skibsakties Songdal, Norway and renamed Songdal. She was sunk by German submarine U-81 at position 50°10′N 10°10′W on 2 February 1917 en route to London from Buenos Aires carrying maize.	Loch Broom
Loch Carron	1885	Four masted barque that collided with Inverskip in 1904, resulting in £30,000 damages against Loch Line. Sold to Kristiansand, Norway in 1912 and renamed Seileren. On 11 October 1915, she was sunk in a collision with SS Vittoria off Torr Head, County Antrim on voyage from Greenock to Delaware.	Loch Carron
Loch Earn	1868	Three masted ship abandoned at sea in November 1873 while sinking after colliding with and sinking the French steamer Ville du Havre in the North Atlantic. All 85 passengers and crew were saved. However, there was a loss of 226 lives from the French ship.	Ville Du Havre & Loch Earn
Loch Etive	1877	Three masted ship. Five days out of Glasgow, on 21 September 1894, her Master, Captain Stuart died at sea on his 63rd birthday. He was buried at sea some 300 miles (480 km) South-West of Queenstown. In 1911, the ship was sold for scrapping in Italy.	Loch Etive
Loch Fyne	1876	Three masted ship that sailed from Lyttelton on 14 May 1883 for the Channel with a cargo of wheat and went missing. Was suspected that she went down during a heavy gale which swept over the Bay of Biscay and English Channel on 1 & 2 September the same year. All 42 passengers and crew perished.	Loch Fyne
Loch Garry	1875	Three masted ship. In 1884 she was part of the relief expedition for the ill-fated Lady Franklin Bay Expedition in the Canadian Arctic. She had two serious mishaps, the worst in 1889, when she was dismasted and nearly lost off the Cape of Good Hope in a furious gale, yet still made it to Mauritius 2,600 miles (4,200 km) away. After lying idle for nearly two years, In 1911, the ship was sold for just 1800 pounds for scrapping in Italy. However, in early 1912 she was bought by Italian merchants from the breakers for 2500 pounds and continued in the nitrate trade and later converted to a coal hulk, until laid up after the end of the war in 1919. She was broken up for scrap at Genoa later that same year.	Loch Garry
Loch Katrine	1869	Three masted ship. In 1907, she was nearly lost outbound to Australia. Heavy seas smashed the lifeboats and broke the cabin skylights. Men at the wheel were washed away and the ship broached filling her main deck to the rail. All hands were called to save her. In 1910, she was dismasted off Cape Howe and picked up by a Swedish Steamer. In October 1910, she was sold for carrying coal around the Australian coastline and subsequently taken to Rabaul and sunk as a breakwater.	Loch Katrine
Loch Laggan	1872	Three masted ship (originally named America) purchased from J. H. Watt, Glagow in 1875 and renamed Loch Laggan. She was spoken to on 25 November 1875 in position 26°00′S 25°00′W but was never seen again. She was an iron ship built at Glasgow only three and a half years before she disappeared. She was classed 100 at Lloyds and valued at £25.000, and the hull was largely underwritten at Glasgow. The loss of the cargo fell chiefly on London and Liverpool merchants. The vessel was owned by Mr James AITKEN, of Glasgow and chartered by Messers Thomas MARWOOD and Co, Water St, Liverpool. About 20 passengers embarked by her on the voyage to Melbourne, but in consequence of her going on to the Tuskar Rocks she had to be put back to Liverpool and the passengers were then transferred to another vessel. Crew of 38 all perished.	Loch Laggan
Loch Leven	1870	Three masted ship stranded on 24 October 1871 at King Island, Bass Strait on voyage from Geelong to London with wool. All saved but the Captain drowned when he returned to the ship to retrieve the ship's papers and she capsized.	Loch Leven
Loch Lomond	1870	Three masted ship (later barque rigged), 1908 sold to C. H. Cooper, London, 1908 resold to the Union SS Co. of New Zealand. On 16 July 1908, sailed from Newcastle NSW for Lyttelton with cargo of 1,700 tons of coal. The vessel reached Cook Strait on 8 August, but was forced back by south easterly gales. The barque was partially dismasted, losing her spanker boom, steering binnacle and the saloon deck skylight. The Loch Lomond's skipper, Captain James F. Thompson decided to sail his damaged vessel north around the top of New Zealand. It was this decision that led to the Loch Lomond running aground off of Cape Maria Van Diemen and sinking with the loss of all 19 of her crew. The NZGSS Hinemoa spent three days unsuccessfully searching for the wreck and survivors in November 1908.	Loch Lomond
Loch Long	1876	Three masted ship that sailed from New Caledonia for Glasgow on 29 April 1903, with a cargo of nickel ore and went missing with 24 crew. Wreckage was discovered on the East coast of the Chatham Islands – the wreck was reported by Chatham islanders to be lying just inside Blind Reef, near the NE tip of the island. The Loch Long's skipper, Captain James Strachan was deeply concerned about his heavy cargo (ore-carrying was the death of many a sailing vessel) and the fact that a passage had to be made to and round the Horn 'out of season'. In the event, the Loch Long did not make it south to pick up the westerlies, having apparently struck the NE tip of the Chatham Islands in fog. It was assumed that she had foundered with all hands on the Chatham Islands, as wreckage and one sailor's body was found washed up there.	Loch Long
Loch Maree	1873	Three masted ship, commanded by Captain Alex Scott, that sailed from Geelong on 29 October 1881 bound for London. Her cargo was valued at about £150,000, and consisted chiefly of 8,847 bales of wool intended for the February sales. One day out, she was spoken to by the three-masted schooner Gerfalcon and the barque Don Diego, who was in company with the Loch Maree off Kent's Group on 30 October. The Don Diego was bound for Otago through Foveaux Straits, and before entering there encountered a heavy Northerly gale. The sea was very high at the time, and the weather thick, and the vessels lost sight of each other. Expected to arrive in London in January or early February, the Loch Maree never arrived. The ship Mermerus, that sailed from Melbourne on 20 November 1881 came across a huge iceberg as she crossed the South Pacific on her way to the Horn. Floating in the water at the base of the berg was a large quantity of wreckage that the crew identified as having come from the Loch Maree.	Loch Maree
Loch Moidart	1881	Four masted barque. On 27 January 1890, she was wrecked and capsized at Callantsoog, Nieuwe Diep on voyage from Pisagua to Hamburg with nitrate. Only two of the 32 crew were saved.	Loch Moidart
Loch Ness	1869	Three masted ship. In 1908 she was sold to Stevedore & Shipping Co., Sydney (a subsidiary of Deutsche-Australische Line) for use as a coal hulk. In 1914 she was seized by the Australian Government and was sunk in 1926 by gunfire practice by HMAS Melbourne in the Rottnest ship graveyard off Rottnest Island, Western Australia.	Loch Ness
Loch Nevis	1894	Four masted barque that was sold in 1900 to "Rhederei-Actien-Gesellschaft von 1896" ("Shipping Company Corporation of 1896") in Hamburg and renamed Octavia. On 6 August 1905 she was beached at Bahía Blanca after explosion in the coal cargo, but was salvaged and converted to hulk at Puerto Madryn. On 17 August 1922 she wrecked at Deseado near Penguin Island on voyage to Buenos Aires.	Loch Nevis
Loch Rannoch	1868	Three masted ship purchased in 1875 from Kidston, Ferrier-Kerr and Black, Glasgow and renamed Loch Rannoch. In 1907, she was sold to M. Nielsen of Laurvig, Norway and in 1909 was scrapped at Harburg.	Loch Rannoch
Loch Ryan	1877	Three masted ship, sold to Government of Victoria, Melbourne in 1909 for use as a training ship. In 1910 she was renamed John Murray, and in 1917 was sold to Government of Australia and returned to service. On 29 May 1918, she was wrecked on the Maldon Islands, South Pacific on voyage from San Francisco to Melbourne.	Loch Ryan
Loch Shiel	1878	Three masted ship. On 30 January 1894, she was stranded and subsequently sank on Thorn Island near Milford Haven while seeking shelter from gale, on voyage from Glasgow to Adelaide and Melbourne. Heroic rescue of all 33 aboard by Angle lifeboat.	Loch Shiel
Loch Sloy	1877	Three masted ship. On 24 April 1899 she was wrecked off Kangaroo Island on voyage from Glasgow to Adelaide and Melbourne. Five passengers and 25 crew drowned. There were only 3 survivors.	Loch Sloy
Loch Sunart	1878	Three masted ship. On 11 January 1879, en route from Glasgow to Melbourne, she hit the Skulmartin reef off Ballywalter and sank. All 45 passengers and 32 crew got ashore by lifeboats. An inquiry suspended the certificates of Captain Gavin Weir for nine months and First Officer David Higie for three months. The inquiry heard that Higie mistook the rock for a schooner.	
Loch Tay	1869	Three masted ship. In 1909 she was sold to Huddart Parker & Co., Melbourne for use as a coal hulk. In 1958 she was scrapped at Port Adelaide	Loch Tay
Loch Torridon	1881	Four masted barque that was sold in 1912 to A. E. Blom, Nystad, Norway. On 27 December 1914, she lost all of her rigging and was severely damaged in a hurricane in the North Atlantic. On 24 January 1915, the crew abandoned her in sinking conditions at 51°35′N 12°28′W on voyage from Fredrikstad to Geelong with a load of timber. The crew were rescued by the steamer Orduna.	Loch Torridon
Loch Vennachar	1875	Three masted ship rammed and sunk by SS Cato on 12 November 1901 while at anchor off Thameshaven, later salvaged and repaired. On 14 June 1905 sailed from Glasgow for Adelaide and Melbourne, spoken to in 35°21′S 133°00′E and then disappeared in September 1905 with loss of all 27 lives. Wreck found by the Society for Underwater Historical Research in 1976 off Kangaroo Island.	Loch Vennachar

== See also ==
- Australian National Maritime Museum
- Scottish Maritime Museum
