= Voitre Marek =

Australian artist (1919–1999)

Voitre Marek (30 May 1919 – 27 November 1999), also known as Vojtěch Marek, was an Australian artist. He was born in Czechoslovakia and lived in South Australia from 1949. He is known for his surrealist style and religious art, in particular sculptures, some of which are held in churches around Australia.

== Life in Czechoslovakia ==
Voitre Marek was born on 30 May 1919 in Bítouchov, Czechoslovakia, the eldest of three brothers, to parents Vojtěch Marek and his wife Hermína, née Schinovská.

Voitre became an apprentice to a metal engraver in 1935, before going to study at the Prague Academy of Fine Arts between 1939 and 1944, where he met his future wife, Věra Podpěrová. After this he worked as a freelance sculptor from his own studio, and won prizes for his works in 1946 and 1947.

== Emigration ==
After the Communist coup in February 1948, Voitre and his brother Dusan decided to leave after Voitre was told that he would not be allowed to exhibit his work unless he joined the Communist Party. The brothers managed to cross the border into Germany, with the help of a cousin who was in the underground resistance movement.

The pair stayed for some time at a refugee camp in Dillenburg, West Germany, where Voitre sculpted busts of the American commander, being paid in peanut butter sandwiches. After their stay at the camp, they boarded the Charlton Sovereign, bound for Australia, in August 1948.

After landing at Sydney, the brothers spent some time in Bathurst migrant camp before moving to Adelaide, where Vera joined them and married Voitre on 8 April 1949.

== Career in Australia ==
Under the displaced persons' employment scheme, the new migrants had to work for two years to repay the costs of their voyage. Dusan and Voitre first worked for the railways, until Vera helped Voitre obtain a job as an engraver at Shepphard's Jewellers, where he was later joined by Dušan. Both brothers had their work displayed in group exhibitions; Voitre work was shown at the autumn 1949 exhibition of the Royal South Australian Society of Arts (RSASA), and in July a Contemporary Art Society exhibited works by both of them.

Dušan, whose works created controversy, left Adelaide for some years, while Voitre became director of the New Gallery of Fine Art, established on 8 August 1953 on Rundle Street as a commercial gallery. and later gave Marek his first solo exhibition. During this time most of Marek's output was small drawings and prints, in a surrealist style which has been likened to Jean Arp.

In 1956 Voitre, Vera and their small children then went to work as lighthouse keepers at Cape du Couedic Lighthouse on Kangaroo Island, which was automated and de-staffed in 1957. They then moved to the Troubridge Island Lighthouse, where they stayed until 1960. During this period of isolation he had a religious epiphany, which marked a change in direction in his work.

RSASA put on a solo exhibition of Marek's work in 1960. He then developed a technique for welding steel rods to create sculptures, which initially included several works of an abstract and biomorphic nature. From this point onwards he started producing religious art, in particular sculptures incorporating steel rods and embossed copper, which is held in 24 churches in Australia, including five works commissioned by St Joseph's in Tranmere in 1965. His style blended surrealism with Byzantine and Romanesque features.

The 1966 Adelaide Festival of Arts included a solo exhibition of his work.

== Recognition ==
- 1969–70: Churchill Fellowship, to further his study of religious art
- 1970: Elected associate member of the US Guild for Religious Architecture
- 1997: Papal blessing for his contribution to religious art

== Later life and death ==
In 1973 Marek was involved in a car accident, which caused brain injury, which afterwards affected his work. He died in Adelaide on 27 November 1999, survived by his wife and two children.

Apart from the ecclesiastical work held in churches around the country, the Art Gallery of South Australia holds much of Marek's work, and mounted the first major survey of the brothers' work in 2021.

== New Gallery of Fine Art ==
As mentioned above, Voitre became director of the New Gallery of Fine Art, which was established on 8 August 1953 as a commercial gallery. which was located in Rundle Street (Note: Now Rundle Mall.) with its entrance in Francis Street, leading to a space above the Trocadero Cafe. The gallery, unusually for Adelaide, opened on weekday evenings, as well as daytimes Monday to Saturday, and had permanent displays as well as time-limited solo and group exhibitions.

The inaugural exhibition at the New Gallery showcased the paintings of George Matthews (born 1924 in Kent Town), who had sketched small drawings in places such as Ceylon, Port Said and London. Matthews used mostly pencil and craypas, a type of crayon for his drawings, and also created small sculptures.

The second exhibition was of the work of Francis Roy Thompson (1896–1966), described as a "well-known artist", who painted scenes from nature in South Australia. Thompson, who settled in Adelaide in 1948, also known as Frank Roy or F.R. Thompson, was known as a flouter of convention and one of the more eccentric modernist post-war architects. He won at least two art prizes, and his work is held in the National Gallery of Victoria, Art Gallery of South Australia, Tasmanian Museum and Art Gallery and several regional galleries. An exhibition of his work was held at Carrick Hill in 2014.

Voitre Marek had his first solo exhibition at the gallery.
