= Bítouchov =

- Municipality
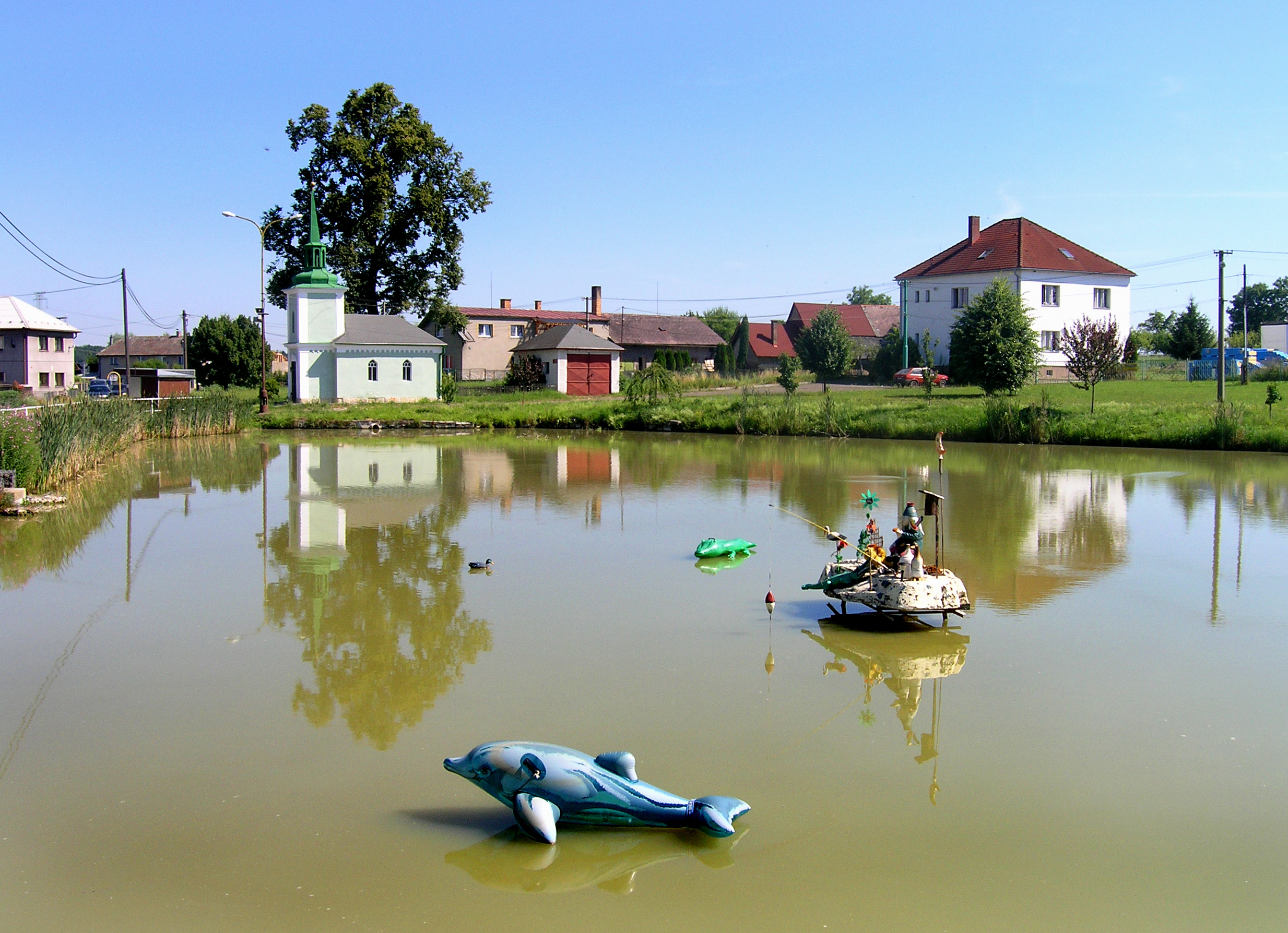
- Centre of Bítouchov

- Location in the Czech Republic
- Coordinates: 50°28′33″N 14°53′22″E
- Country: Czech Republic
- Region: Central Bohemian
- District: Mladá Boleslav
- First mentioned: 1388

Area
  - Total: 7.10 km^{2} (2.74 sq mi)
- Elevation: 281 m (922 ft)

Population (2026-01-01)
  - Total: 441
  - Density: 62.1/km^{2} (161/sq mi)
- Time zone: UTC+1 (CET)
  - Summer (DST): UTC+2 (CEST)
- Postal code: 294 01
- Website: www.obec-bitouchov.cz

Bítouchov is a municipality and village in Mladá Boleslav District in the Central Bohemian Region of the Czech Republic. It has about 400 inhabitants.

== Administrative division ==
Bítouchov consists of three municipal parts (in brackets population according to the 2021 census):

- Bítouchov (305)
- Dalešice (58)
- Dolánky (68)

== Geography ==
Bítouchov is located about 5 kilometres (3 mi) north of Mladá Boleslav and 48 km (30 mi) northeast of Prague. It lies in the Jizera Table.

== History ==
The first written mention of Bítouchov is from 1388. However, a mention of "Bítúch's court" allegedly appeared as early as the 12th century. The village was part of the Zvířetice estate.

== Demographics ==
Historical population

Year	Pop.	±%
1869	525	—
1880	496	−5.5%
1890	542	+9.3%
1900	578	+6.6%
1910	674	+16.6%

Year	Pop.	±%
1921	562	−16.6%
1930	645	+14.8%
1950	427	−33.8%
1961	416	−2.6%
1970	354	−14.9%

Year	Pop.	±%
1980	315	−11.0%
1991	247	−21.6%
2001	282	+14.2%
2011	340	+20.6%
2021	431	+26.8%

Source: Censuses

== Transport ==
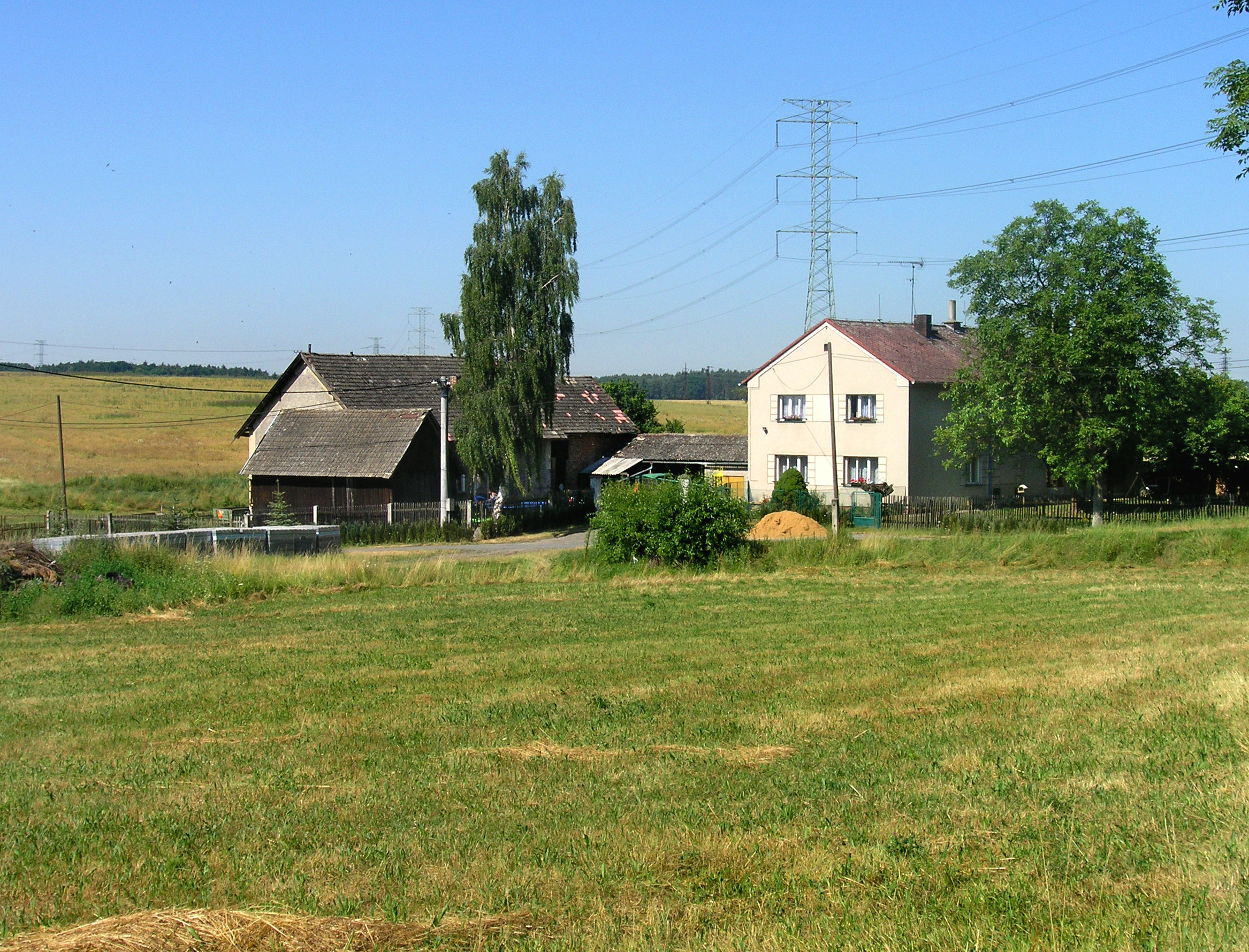
The village of Dolánky

The railway line Mladá Boleslav–Rumburk runs through the southern part of the municipality and along the northern municipal border, but there is no train station.

== Sights ==
The only cultural monument in Bítouchov is the Chapel of the Virgin Mary, located in the centre of the village. It was built in the Empire style in 1830.

== Notable people ==
- Voitre Marek (1919–1999), Czech-Australian artist
