= List of shipwrecks in 1890 =

The list of shipwrecks in 1890 includes ships sunk, foundered, grounded, or otherwise lost during 1890.

table of contents
1890
Jan	Feb	Mar	Apr
May	Jun	Jul	Aug
Sep	Oct	Nov	Dec
Unknown date

== Unknown date ==
List of shipwrecks: Unknown date 1890
Ship	State	Description
Aslacoe	United Kingdom	The steamship was wrecked at Freshwater Point, Newfoundland Colony. Her 25 crew survived. She was on a voyage from Grimsby, Lincolnshire to Montreal, Quebec, Canada.
Atalanta	United States	The ship foundered off Cape Flattery, Washington.
Castillian	United States	The schooner was driven ashore and wrecked on Bald Porcupine Island, Maine. She was on a voyage from Bar Harbor to Deer Island, Maine.
Cyphrenia	United Kingdom	The steamship was driven ashore at the mouth of the York River, Virginia, United States. She was later refloated with the assistance of Merritt (United States) and resumed her voyage to Liverpool, Lancashire.
Dinapore	United Kingdom	The barque was wrecked at Cape Corrientes, Argentina with the loss of six of her 20 crew. She was on a voyage from Middlesbrough, Yorkshire to Bahía Blanca, Brazil.
Dunluce	United Kingdom	The cargo ship was wrecked on the Wijkesgrund.
Erik Berendsen	United Kingdom	The ship went ashore on the island of Sylt, Germany, with the loss of all but one of her crew. A lifeboat capsized whilst trying to save her crew.
Eva	Norway	The ship was wrecked on the coast of Canada. Her crew survived.
Ferm	Mexico	The brig was lost at Laguna de Términos. She was on a voyage from Laguna de Términos to the English Channel.
Friedrich	Norway	The clipper was abandoned in the Atlantic Ocean.
George	Netherlands	The barque was abandoned in the Atlantic Ocean and the crew landed at Queenstown, County Cork, United Kingdom by Emily (Norway) on 14 February.
George H. Chance	United States	The steam fishing boat was lost off the coast of Oregon with the loss of all fifteen crew.
Hattie Dell	Flag unknown	.The schooner was abandoned at sea. She was on a voyage from the Turks Islands to Boston, Massachusetts, United States.
Henry Buck	United Kingdom	The barque was presumed to have foundered in the Pacific Ocean several hundred miles off New Zealand with the loss of all hands. She was on a voyage from Newcastle upon Tyne, Northumberland to a port in New South Wales.
Hugo	United Kingdom	The ship foundered in the Sunda Strait with the loss of all hands. She was on a voyage from Singapore to Marseille, Bouches-du-Rhône, France.
Irene	France	The barque was lost at sea, and the crew landed at Lima , Peru on 7 December by Maravilla (Flag unknown).
Lawrence McKenzie		The schooner was lost opposite Forked River, New Jersey.
Louise Ernest	France	While en route for Nantes, France, from Falmouth, Cornwall, England, the ketch was unable to round the Lizard and turned back. She hit Castle Point, St Mawes, Cornwall, and the crew of five men and a boy were taken off by the lifeboat Jane Whittington ( Royal National Lifeboat Institution) of the Falmouth Lifeboat Station.
Marlborough	United Kingdom	The refrigerated full-rigged ship disappeared after being sighted off the coast of New Zealand on 13 January while on a voyage from Lyttelton, New Zealand, to London. Possibly subsequently wrecked on the coast of Chile with the loss of all on board.
Modesta	Barbados	The barque was lost in a collision with another vessel.
Nova Sympathia	Brazil	The ship was lost after 14 May.
Picton Castle	United Kingdom	The ship ran aground in the Paraná River downstream of Rosario, Argentina between 17 March and 15 April. She was refloated.
Prima Donna	United Kingdom	The fishing smack struck a rock in Rosscarbery Bay and sank. Her crew survived.
Selene	United Kingdom	The full-rigged ship was driven ashore and wrecked at Santa Rosalia. She was on a voyage from Briton Ferry, Glamorgan to Santa Rosalia.
Talookdar	United Kingdom	The full-rigged ship collided with Libussa (flag unknown) off the Cape of Good Hope and foundered.
Webster	United States	The vessel was lost at Atka Island in the Andreanof Islands – part of the Aleutian Islands – in the District of Alaska.
William W. Rice	United States	The fishing schooner was lost on a halibut fishing trip to Iceland in March or April. All sixteen crew were killed.
Unnamed lifeboat	Germany	A lifeboat was lost while attempting to rescue the crew of Erik Berendsen (United Kingdom) which went ashore on the island of Sylt, Germany. Eleven lifeboat crew died.
