= Shipwreck Coast =

Segment of coastline in Victoria, Australia

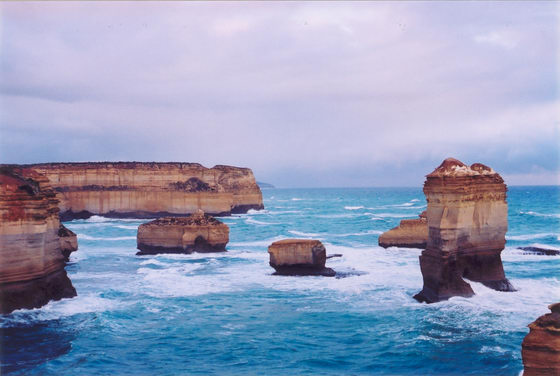
Limestone formations east of Loch Ard Gorge

The Shipwreck Coast of Victoria, Australia stretches from Cape Otway to Port Fairy, a distance of approximately 130 km. This coastline is accessible via the Great Ocean Road, and is home to the limestone formations called The Twelve Apostles.

Explorer Matthew Flinders said of the Shipwreck Coast, "I have seldom seen a more fearful section of coastline."

There are approximately 638 known shipwrecks along Victoria’s coast, although only around 240 of them have been discovered. The Historic Shipwreck Trail along the Shipwreck Coast and the Discovery Coast shows some of the sites where gales, human error and, in some cases, foul play caused these vessels to be wrecked.

Ships wrecked on the Shipwreck Coast include:

- Thistle (1837)
- Children (1839)
- Unknown French whaler (1841)
- Lydia (1843)
- Socrates (1843)
- Cataraqui (1845)
- Enterprise (1850)
- Essington (1852)
- Freedom (1853)
- SS Schomberg (built Liverpool, named after Charles Frederick Schomberg, sunk 1855)
- John Scott (1858)
- Golden Spring (1863)
- Marie Gabrielle (1869)
- Young Australian (1877)
- Loch Ard (1878)
- Napier (1878)
- Alexandra (1882)
- Yarra (1882)
- Edinburgh Castle (1888)
- Fiji (1891)
- Joseph H. Scammell (1891)
- Newfield (1892)
- Freetrader (1894)
- La Bella (1905)
- Falls of Halladale (1908)
- The Speculant (1911)
- Antares (1914)
- Casino (1932)
- City of Rayville (1940)

Over 50 shipwrecks are commemorated in a Historic Shipwreck Trail beginning at Port Fairy.
