= Loch Ard (ship) =

UK ship launched in 1873

Coordinates: 38°38′55″S 143°04′19″E

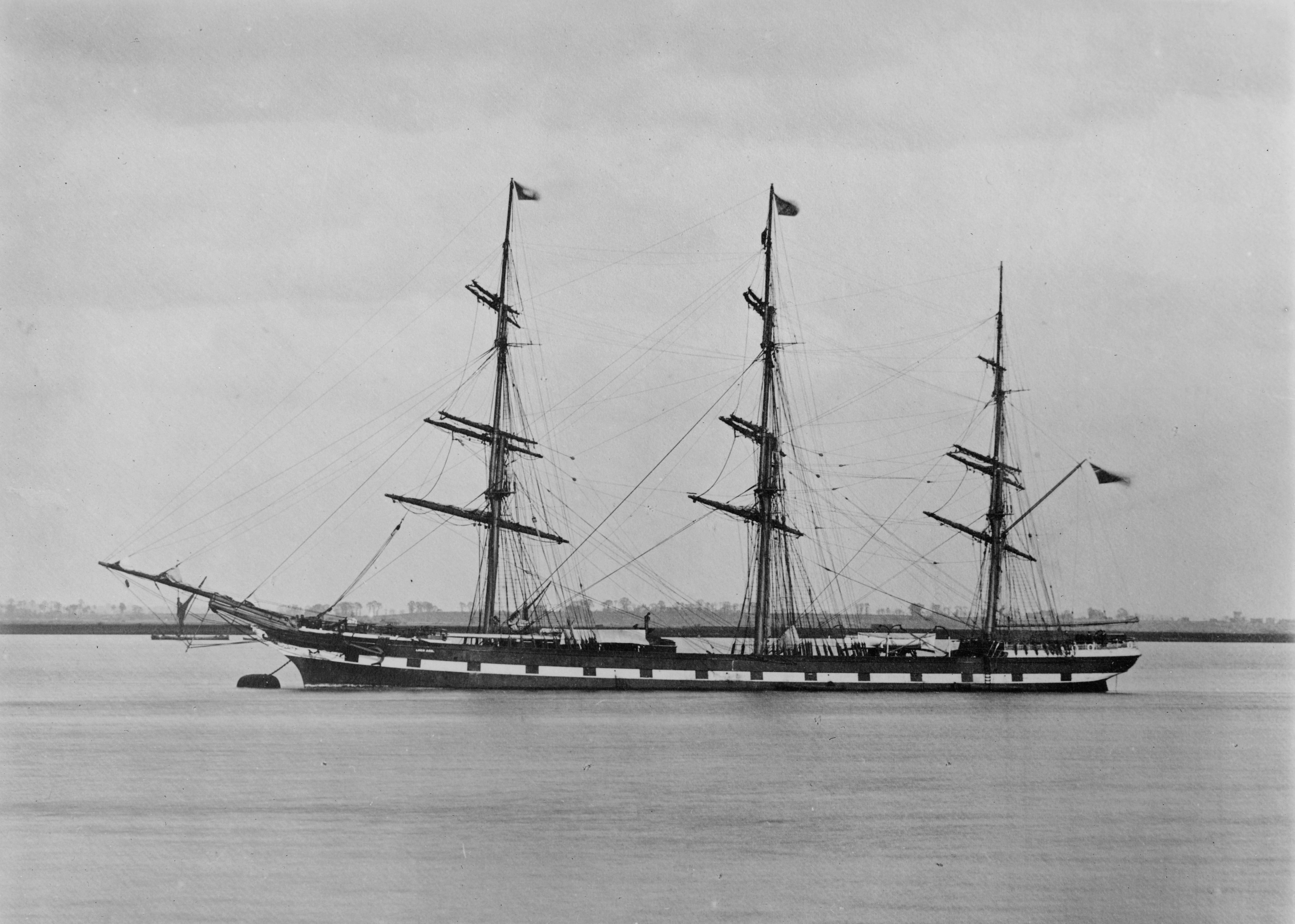

History

United Kingdom
- Name: Loch Ard
- Namesake: Loch Ard, Scotland
- Owner: General Shipping Co
- Operator: James Aitken
- Port of registry: Glasgow
- Builder: Charles Connell & Co, Scotstoun
- Yard number: 87
- Launched: 8 November 1873
- Maiden voyage: Glasgow – Melbourne; 26 January – 24 May 1874
- Identification: official number 68061; code letters WSGD
- Fate: Wrecked 1 June 1878

General characteristics
- Type: Clipper
- Tonnage: 1,693 GRT, 1,624 NRT
- Length: 262.7 ft (80.1 m)
- Beam: 38.3 ft (11.7 m)
- Depth: 23.0 ft (7.0 m)
- Propulsion: sail, three masts
- Sail plan: full-rigged ship
- Crew: 17
- Notes: Gave her name to Loch Ard Gorge, where she was wrecked.

Loch Ard was an iron-hulled clipper ship that was built in Scotland in 1873 and wrecked on the Shipwreck Coast of Victoria, Australia in 1878.

== Building ==
Charles Connell and Company of Scotstoun, Glasgow built Loch Ard for the General Shipping Company, part of the Loch Line of Glasgow that operated between Great Britain and Australia. Her yard number was 57 and she was launched on 8 November 1873. Her registered length was 262.7 ft (80.1 m), her beam was 38.3 ft (11.7 m) and her depth was 23.0 ft (7.0 m). Her tonnages were 1,693 GRT and 1,624 NRT. She had three masts and was a full-rigged ship.

Her owners registered Loch Ard in Glasgow. Her official number was 68061 and her code letters were WSGD.

The ship was named after Loch Ard in Scotland, a loch west of Aberfoyle and east of Loch Lomond. It means "high lake" in Scottish Gaelic. She gave her name to Loch Ard Gorge on the Shipwreck Coast.

== Maiden voyage ==
Loch Ard was twice dismasted on her maiden voyage from Glasgow to Melbourne. The first dismasting was in December 1873, only days after leaving Glasgow. She was able to turn back and be repaired. On 26 January 1874 she left Glasgow for the second time. On 2 April a gale in the Southern Ocean broke all three of her masts. On the fourth day after the accident, her crew managed to bale her out and make jury-masts. She reached Melbourne on 24 May.

== Final voyage ==
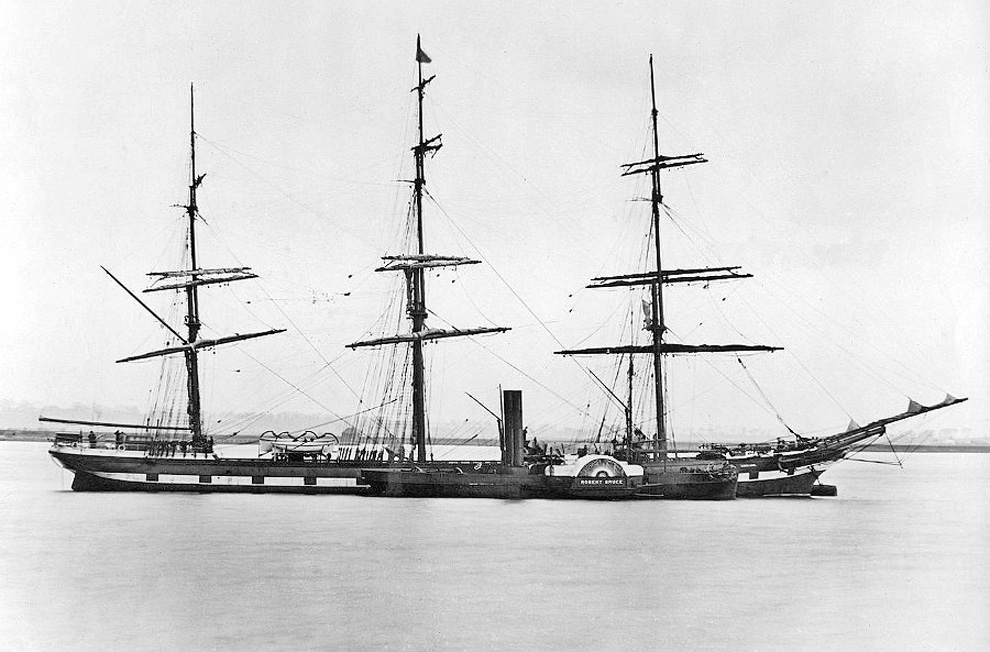
Loch Ard with the Thames tugboat Robert Bruce

Loch Ard left Gravesend, Kent on 1 March 1878, bound for Melbourne, commanded by Captain George Gibb and with a crew of 36 men and 18 passengers, a total of 54 people. She was loaded with a general mixed cargo weighing 2275 tons. On 1 June she was approaching Melbourne. The crew expected to sight land but encountered heavy mist. The inquest determined that, unable to see the Cape Otway lighthouse; having faulty chronometers on board; and not having been able to take a reading to establish his exact position due to bad weather conditions over the previous few days, Captain Gibb was unaware how close he was running to the coast. The mist lifted around 4am, revealing breakers and cliff faces. The lookout called “breakers ahead!” Capt Gibb quickly ordered sail to be set to wear ship and get clear of the coast, but they were unable to do so in time, and ran aground on a reef. The masts and rigging came down, killing some people on deck and preventing the lifeboats from being launched effectively. The ship sank within 10 or 15 minutes of striking the reef.

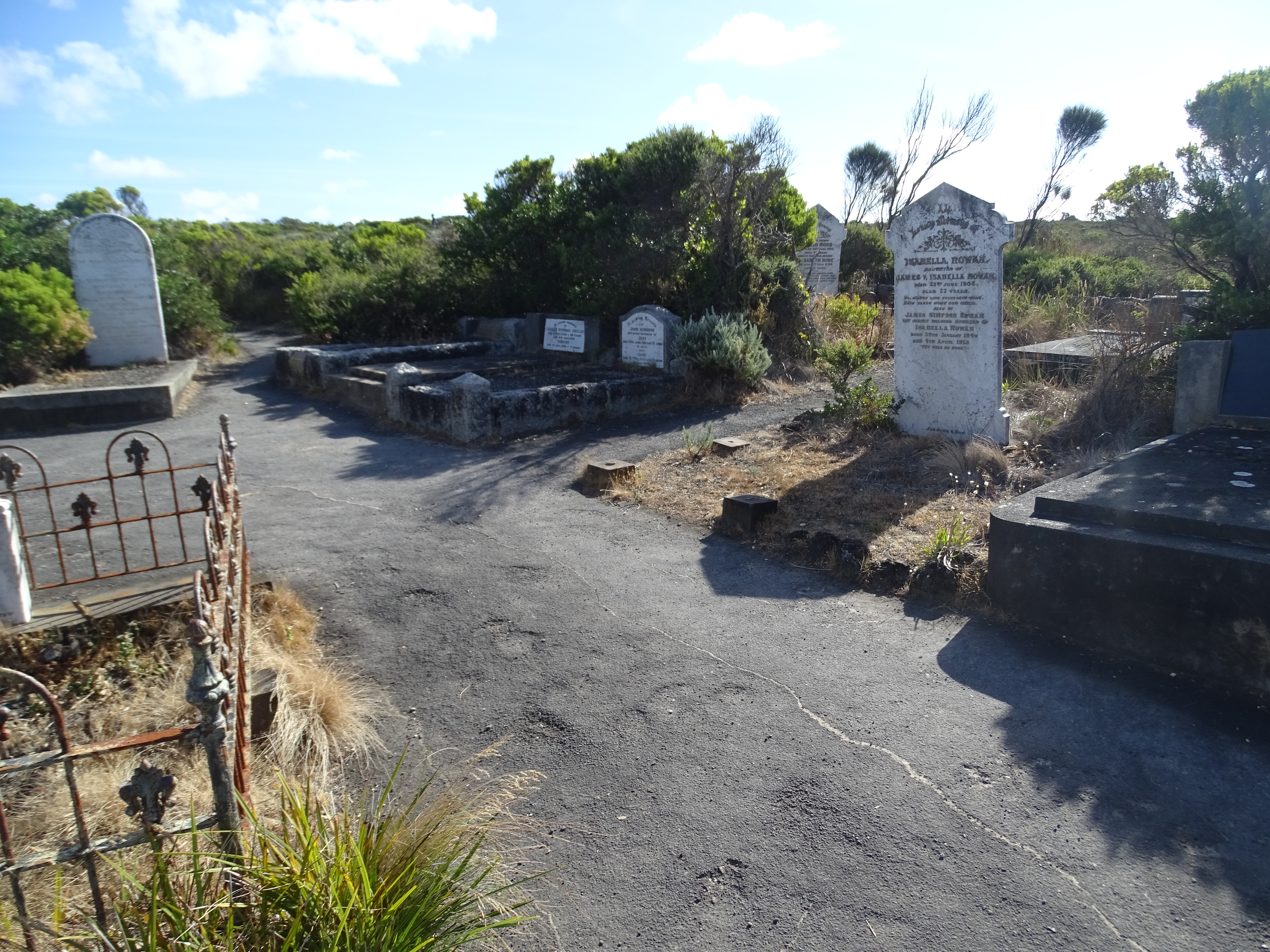
Graves of some of the passengers and crew of Loch Ard, near Loch Ard Gorge

The widespread popular belief that Gibb mistook the opening of the nearby Loch Ard Gorge for Port Phillip Heads has no basis in fact or probability. There is no physical or cartographic resemblance whatever, ships are obliged to stop outside the Heads to take on a pilot, and Loch Ard never entered the Gorge.

The only two survivors of the wreck were Eva Carmichael, who survived by clinging to a spar for five hours, and Thomas Pearce, an apprentice who clung to the upturned hull of a lifeboat. Pearce came ashore first, then heard Carmichael's shouts and went back into the ocean to rescue her. They came ashore at what is now known as Loch Ard Gorge and sheltered there before seeking help. Pearce was the stepson of Captain RGA Pearce, Master of SS Gothenburg, which had been wrecked off Queensland in 1875.

== Surviving artefacts ==
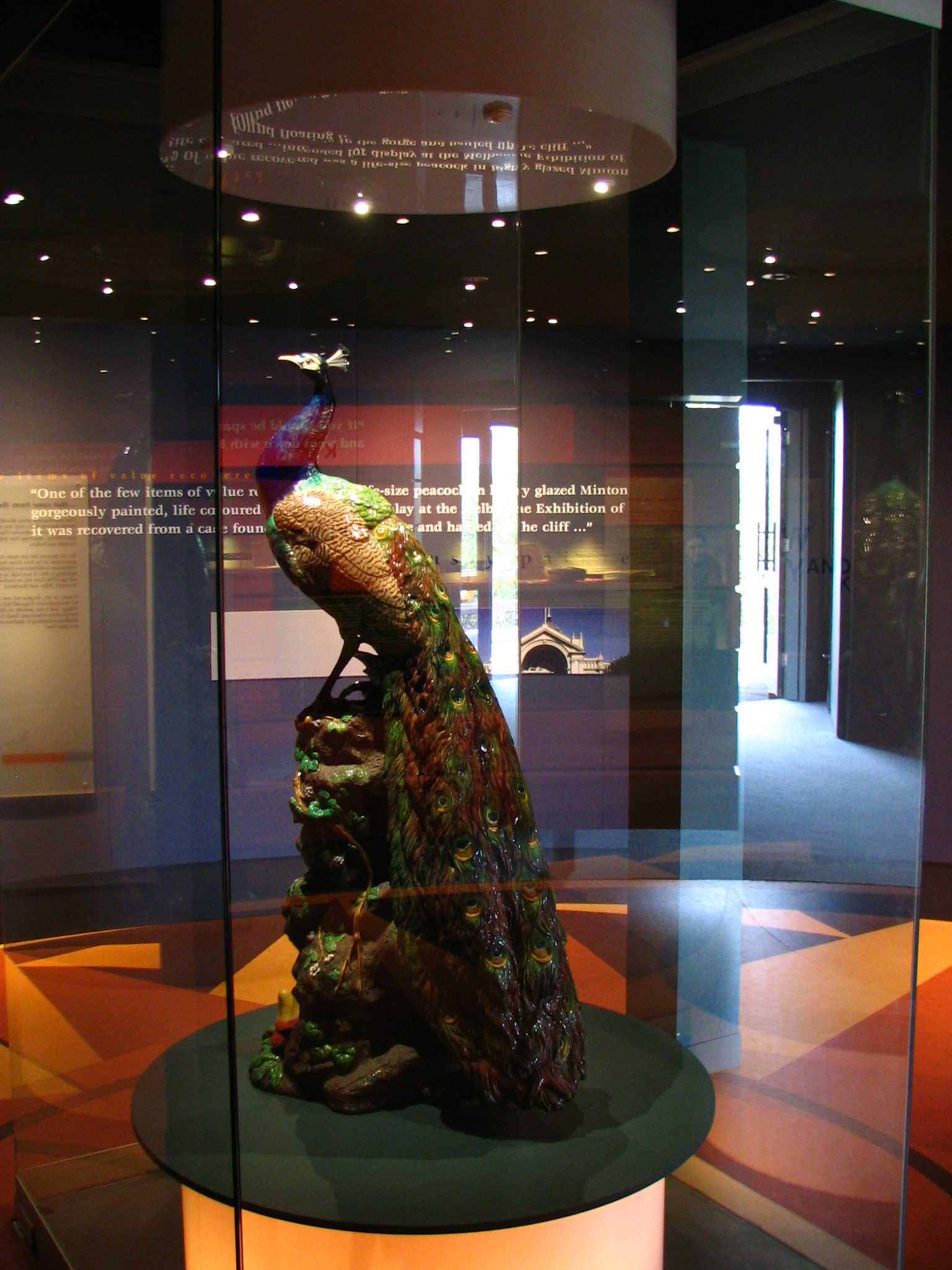
The Loch Ard Peacock, now in Flagstaff Hill Maritime Museum

Loch Ard's cargo included various luxury goods, including a grand piano which later washed up in the Gorge, and a large decorative porcelain peacock made by Mintons in England, intended to be displayed in the Melbourne International Exhibition in 1880. The peacock was recovered intact and was eventually able to be displayed a century later for the Victoria Pavilion at the Brisbane 1988 World Exposition. It is now on display at the Flagstaff Hill Maritime Museum in Warrnambool, Victoria, along with other relics of the wreck.

Also recovered was a unique Georgian pocket watch, made in 1814 by the Belfast watchmaker James McCabe, reputedly for Dublin Corporation to present to King George IV in 1814. It was found in the waistband of Eva Carmichael's elder sister Rebecca, whose body was among those recovered and buried after the shipwreck. Eva returned to Ireland, and in 1884 married a Thomas Townsend, to whom she gave the watch. The watch remained with their heirs until October 2011, when their grandson auctioned it in Australia. Flagstaff Hill Maritime Museum had the watch designated an "item of national significance", thereby securing federal government funding to buy the watch for the museum.

== Wreck ==
Loch Ard's wreck lies at a depth of 25 metres (82 ft). It is a recreational wreck diving site, rated "Advanced Open Water and beyond".

== Play ==
Eva and the Cabin Boy by Sheila Dewey, produced at the Warehouse Theatre in Croydon in 1994, concerned the Loch Ard shipwreck.

== See also ==
- List of disasters in Australia by death toll

== Sources ==
- Charlwood, DE (1971). The wreck of the Loch Ard: End of a Ship, End of an Era. London & Sydney: Angus & Robertson. ISBN 0-207-12316-0.
- Charlwood, Don (1993). Wrecks & reputations: the loss of the Schomberg and Loch Ard (3rd ed.). Burgewood Books. ISBN 0-646-28006-6.
- Loney, Jack K (1970). The Loch Ard Disaster. Geelong: Marine History Publications. ISBN 0-9599853-1-X.
