= Danger =

Danger is a lack of safety and may refer to:

== Places ==
- Danger Cave, an archaeological site in Utah
- Danger Island, Great Chagos Bank, Indian Ocean
- Danger Island, alternate name of Pukapuka Atoll in the Cook Islands, Pacific Ocean
- Danger Islands, Antarctica
- Danger Point, a coastal feature and cliff face in Devon, England
- Point Danger (Portland), Victoria, Australia
- Point Danger (Torquay), Victoria, Australia
- Point Danger (Tweed Heads), on the border of New South Wales and Queensland, Australia

== People ==
- Danger (musician) (born 1984), stage name of French electronic musician Franck Rivoire
- Danger Quintana (born 1994), Cuban former volleyball player
- Danger, South African musician in the kwaito group Big Nuz

== Film and television ==
- Danger, a 2003 Bangladeshi film featuring Shakib Khan
- Danger (2005 film), an Indian Telugu-language thriller written and directed by Krishna Vamsi
- Danger (unreleased Hindi film), an Indian Bollywood horror thriller written and directed by Faisal Saif
- Danger (TV series), a 1950–1955 American live drama anthology series
- "Danger" (QI), a 2006 TV episode

== Music ==
=== Groups and labels ===
- Danger Danger, an American hard rock band

=== Albums ===
- Danger (album), a 2009 album by P-Square
- Danger Danger (album), a 1989 self-titled album
- Danger! (EP), an EP by The Sound of Arrows

=== Songs ===
- "Danger" (The Motels song), 1980
- "Danger" (Sharon O'Neill song), 1983
- "Danger" (The Flirts song), 1983
- "Danger" (AC/DC song), 1985
- "Danger" (Blahzay Blahzay song), 1993
- "Danger" (Erykah Badu song), 2003
- "Danger" (Katie Underwood song), 2003
- "Danger" (Migos and Marshmello song), 2017
- "Danger (Been So Long)" by Mystikal, 2000
- "Danger (Spider)", a 2023 song by Offset and JID
- "Danger" by Hilary Duff from Dignity, 2007
- "Danger" by Lil Baby from It's Only Me, 2022
- "Danger" by Mötley Crüe from Shout at the Devil, 1983
- "Danger" by Olivia Dean from Messy, 2023
- "Danger" by Third Eye Blind from Out of the Vein
- "Danger" by Tomorrow X Together from The Star Chapter: Sanctuary, 2024
- "Danger", by Woo!ah! from Joy, 2022

== Literature ==
- Danger (comics), the physical manifestation of X-Men's self-aware Danger Room software
- Danger!: Being the Log of Captain John Sirius, a 1914 story by Arthur Conan Doyle

== Companies ==
- Danger (company), a Microsoft subsidiary which made cellular telephones
- High Voltage Software, an American video game developer
- Nebraska Danger, an Indoor Football League team based in Grand Island, Nebraska

== See also ==
- Danger Danger (disambiguation)
- Danger Island (disambiguation)
- Danger Zone (disambiguation)
- Dangerous (disambiguation)
- Dangers (disambiguation)
- Point Danger (disambiguation)
