= Whites Beach (Torquay) =

Beach in Torquay, Victoria, Australia

- Beach
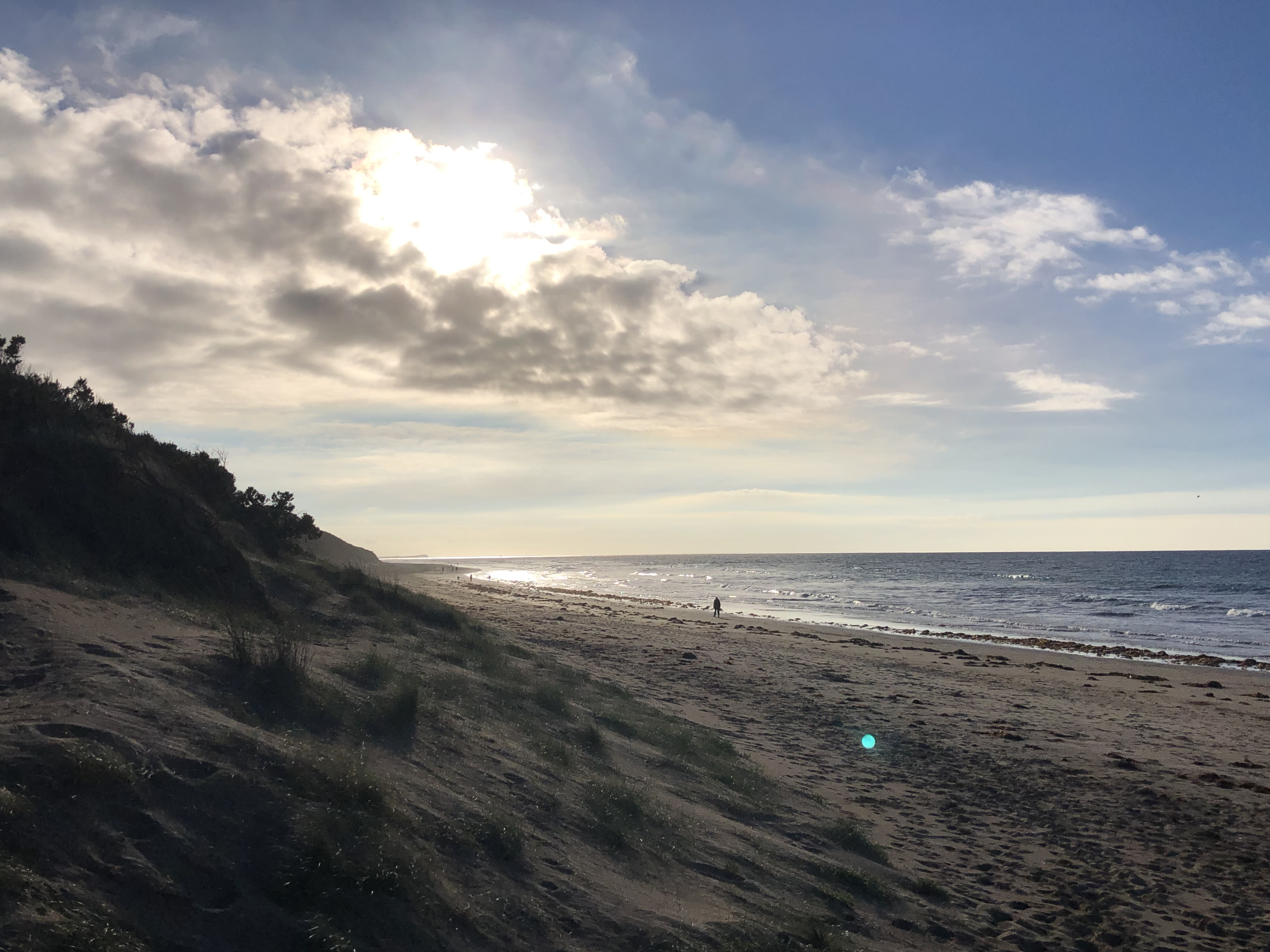
- Whites Beach
- Interactive map of Whites Beach
- Coordinates: 38°19′08″S 144°20′44″E
- Location: Torquay, Victoria, Australia
- Water bodies: Bass Strait

Dimensions
  - Length: 4.5 kilometres (2.8 mi)
- Hazard rating: 5/10 (moderately hazardous)
- Access: The Esplanade

Whites Beach is a long sandy beach located between Torquay and Breamlea on Victoria's Surf Coast, Australia. Extending for approximately 4.5 kilometres, it is one of the longer beaches in the Torquay area and is known for its natural setting, walking opportunities and popularity among dog owners. The beach is backed by a foreshore reserve, access tracks through the duns and several car parking areas, while its sheltered position and offshore reefs creates relatively calm conditions compared with many other beaches along the coast.

== History ==
Whites Beach takes its name from Andrew White an Englishman from Warwickshire who arrived in Australia in 1852 and acquired extensive land around the Torquay area. White established his home at Stretton Park, Mount Duneed, and gradually expanded his holdings until he owned much of the land surrounding present-day Torquay.

Following Andrew White's death, the property passed to his son Alfred George White. Both Andrew and Alfred were active members of the local community, with Andrew serving for many years as a councillor representing the Connewarre Riding, while Alfred contributed land for community purposes, including the establishment of a racetrack. During the early twentieth century, Alfred White made a symbolic sale of land known as "Whites Paddock" to the Torquay Golf Club, allowing the organisation to establish an 18-hole golf course on the property.

The area also played a role during the Second World War period, when Australian Light Horsemen trained along the beach in early 1940. Whilst in the area, they also assisted in putting out bushfires.

On July 13 2014, whilst running along the beach with his dog, Sean Purcell suddenly collapsed and went into cardiac arrest. The first two people to spot him on the beach were a former nurse and a personal trainer from the Army, who both underwent CPR training. This was followed by another two people who knew CPR who arrived, and another two who taught resuscitation courses at Jan Juc Surf Life Saving Club. A further two arrived, one running to the nearby golf course to retrieve a defibrillator. Paramedics arrived and he was subsequently airlifted to Geelong Hospital, where he was in a coma for five days. Upon awakening, he had lost six-eight months of his memory.

== Description ==
Whites Beach faces southeast and stretches from the mouth of Deep Creek towards Point Impossible. Its southern and eastern sections receive protection from the nearby Point Danger and extensive offshore rock reefs, resulting in generally low-energy surf conditions. Waves typically average around one metre and form a continuous shallow sandbar, although rips may develop during and after periods of larger swell, particularly around reefs and rocky areas.

The beach is considered moderately safe for swimming close to shore, although visitors are advised to take care around deeper channels, reefs and rocks during higher wave conditions. The eastern section of the beach, towards Point Impossible, includes a designated optional-dress (nude) beach area.

Whites Beach is particularly popular among local dog owners, as it is one of the Surf Coast Shire's designated off-leash beaches. The beach attracts regular morning and weekend visitors, with dog walking forming a significant part of its recreational use.

== See also ==
- Thirteenth Beach
- Torquay Surf Beach
- Torquay Front Beach
- Jan Juc Beach
- Great Ocean Road
