= Fishermans Beach =

Beach in Torquay, Victoria, Australia

- Beach
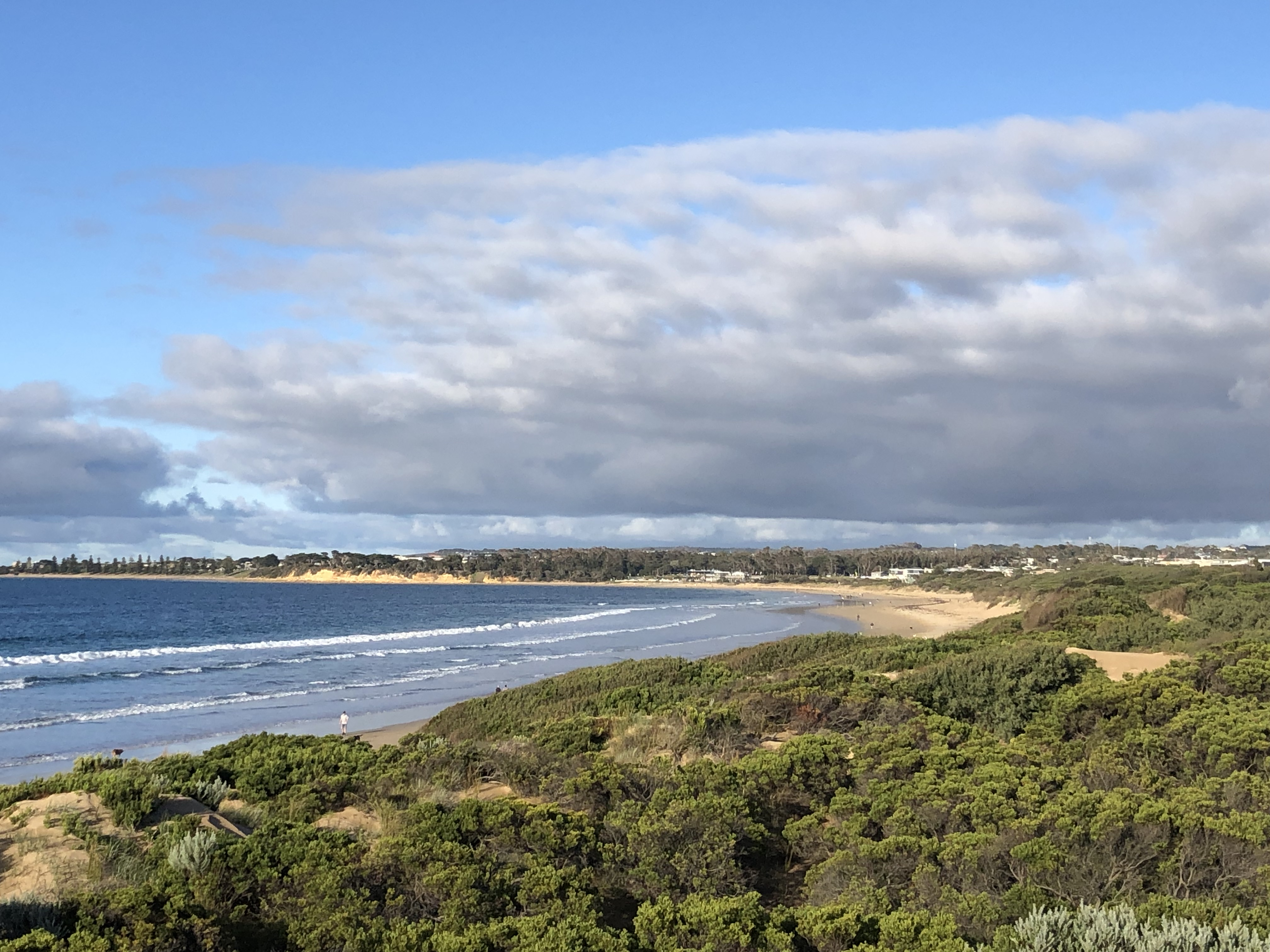
- Fishermans Beach
- Interactive map of Fishermans Beach
- Coordinates: 38°19′35″S 144°19′43″E
- Location: Torquay, Victoria, Australia
- Water bodies: Bass Strait

Dimensions
  - Length: 1 kilometre (0.62 mi)
- Patrolled by: SLSA
- Hazard rating: 4/10 (moderately hazardous)
- Access: The Esplanade

Fishermans Beach (commonly known as "Fishos") is a beach located in Torquay, Victoria, Australia. Extending for approximately 1 kilometre between the mouth of Deep Creek and Yellow Bluff, it is one of Torquay's most sheltered beaches and has long served as the town's centre for commercial and recreational boating and fishing. The beach is backed by a foreshore reserve and The Esplanade, and today accommodates a beach boat ramp, the Torquay Angling Club, the Torquay Sailing Club and the Torquay Marine Rescue Service.

== History ==
Fishing activity at Fishermans Beach dates back to at least the 1860s, when fisherman established huts and tents along the shoreline. The beach became the base for Torquay's early fishing fleet, with catches regularly transported to the growing market in Geelong. The beach's long association with the fishing industry gave rise to its name.

The Torquay Motor, Yacht and Angling Club was established at the beach in 1961 by foundation directions J. Pawson, J. Poole, A. McKenzie, O. Yateman and C. Troy. In 1982, the organisation was renamed the Torquay Angling Club. The beach later became home to the Torquay Marine Rescue Service, founded by J. Norman Ainsworth, Adri Dijksman and Pat Dungan.

A historic anchor recovered from the wreck of the Joseph H. Scammell is displayed on the foreshore, with another located on the foreshore beside the front beach.

== Description ==
Fishermans Beach extends from the mouth of Deep Creek before curving south towards the limestone cliffs of Yellow Bluff. Situated within the sheltered waters of Zeally Bay, it is a low-energy beach protected from the larger swells that affect much of the Surf Coast, making it one of Torquay's safest and calmest swimming beaches. The beach is characterised by a broad, shallow sandbar with rip currents rarely forming under normal conditions.

The beach has a launching ramp and facilities for recreational fishing, sailing, motor boating at its western end. It is also popular for swimming during the summer months due to its generally calm conditions, while larger winter swells can occasionally produce surfable waves over the shallow reefs and sandbars. Anglers commonly fish from the reefs around Yellow Bluff, particularly at high tide.

== See also ==
- Thirteenth Beach
- Torquay Surf Beach
- Torquay Front Beach
- Jan Juc Beach
- Great Ocean Road
