= Addiscot Beach =

Beach in Victoria, Australia

Addiscot Beach Point Addis Beach Addis Beach
- Beach
- Addiscot Beach
- Interactive map of Addiscot Beach
- Coordinates: 38°22′59″S 144°15′20″E
- Location: Bells Beach, Victoria, Australia
- Water bodies: Bass Strait

Dimensions
  - Length: 1.8 kilometres (1.1 mi)
- Hazard rating: 6/10 (moderately hazardous)
- Access: Point Addis Road

Addiscot Beach, also known as Addis Beach or Point Addis Beach, is an unpatrolled beach located near Bells Beach, Victoria, Australia. The beach is a popular tourist stop along the Great Ocean Road, and sees many swimmers and surfers in the summer months. The beach is also notable for its dominating cliffs, reaching as high as 80 metres, and geology.

== Geology and geography ==
The beach stretches from the Jarosite Headland to the east, and to Point Addis on its western end, with the cliffs at Point Addis at a height of 20 metres gradually increasing in height to around 80 metres at Jarosite Headland. Much of the cliffs stretching from Jarosite Headland towards Point Addis are composed of the Demons Bluff Formation (of the Late Eocene to Early Oligocene age), which is mostly made up of the Anglesea Formation, which is a type of siltstone. It comprises brownish black to brownish grey, carbonaceous, pyritic, silty clay, with abundant burrows, filled with sand that have been made by marine invertebrates. Upper sections of the cliff that are more strongly weathered contain paler sediments, with the pyrite being altered into yellow jarosite, gypsum or limonite. The Jarosite Headland gets its name from the jarosite rock. The rocks at Point Addis, whilst being the 'type' locality for Point Addis Limestone, have a small amount of Demons Bluff Group rocks at beach level that occurred from a landslip, which predates the Point Addis Limestone.

A major landslip in the cliffs overlooking the middle of the beach is known as the Ironbark Basin which is rich in vegetation. It is named after the Ironbark tree, which occurs in patchy areas of dry, shallow, ferruginous soils south of the Great Dividing Range. It grows alongside Messmate and Brown Stringybark. Ironbark can be seen at a higher level, with the stringybarks (Messmate and Brown Stringybark) seen further down. The Paper-flower, which has very scattered occurrences across Victoria, flowers here, alongside the rare velvet Daisy-bush subspecies cardiophylla.

The beach itself receives waves averaging 1 to 1.5 metres, which incrementally increase in size from Point Addis to Jarosite Headland. With the increase in the size of waves, the beach is incrementally cut by rips closer towards the Headland. The fine sand, combined with the waves, produces a continuous bar along the length of the beach, with the corner of the beach closest to Point Addis being the calmest and largely absent of rips and large waves.

The beach is popular with surfers, and a small surfbreak known as "Pixie Caves" (named after a small cave underneath Point Addis) is found off to the right of the Point. The neighbouring Southside Beach is a designated nude beach, with clothes being optional from Jarosite Headland to Bells Headland.

== History ==
Addiscot Beach is named after Addiscot Homestead, which in turn was named after Edward Brown Addis, the Commissioner of Crown Lands during the 1840s, who lived in a small cottage at the site prior to the construction of the homestead.

During WW2, Point Addis and Ironbark Basin were acquired by the Royal Australian Air Force as a firing range, including bombing and strafing.

At 7:20 in the morning on 6 June 2013, cyclists stumbled across a burnt-out car, with the remains of an unidentified body found inside.

On July 2, 2013, a woman was attended to by emergency workers and subsequently airlifted after falling from 60 metre-tall cliffs surrounding the beach, suffering head and leg injuries, and was found in a non-life-threatening condition.

On New Year's Eve 2021, a cliff collapse at the Jarosite Headland resulted in 5 injuries and one death.

On November 28, 2022, 18 year old Highton resident Jonah Lear was found dead at the beach after committing suicide, following a battle with mental illness.

Another cliff collapse occurred on January 4, 2026, after a paraglider several days prior warned locals of visible cracking in the cliff. No one was injured.

== Access and features ==
The beach can be accessed from the Great Ocean Road via Point Addis Road, with several car parking areas. From the car park, a small path and staircase leads down to the beach, with the Ironbark Track breaking off and heading up toward the Ironbark Basin towards Southside Beach and Bells Beach. Public toilets also exist adjacent to the car parks.

== See also ==
- Bells Beach
- Twelve Apostles (Victoria)
- Great Ocean Road
