= Bells Beach =

- Town
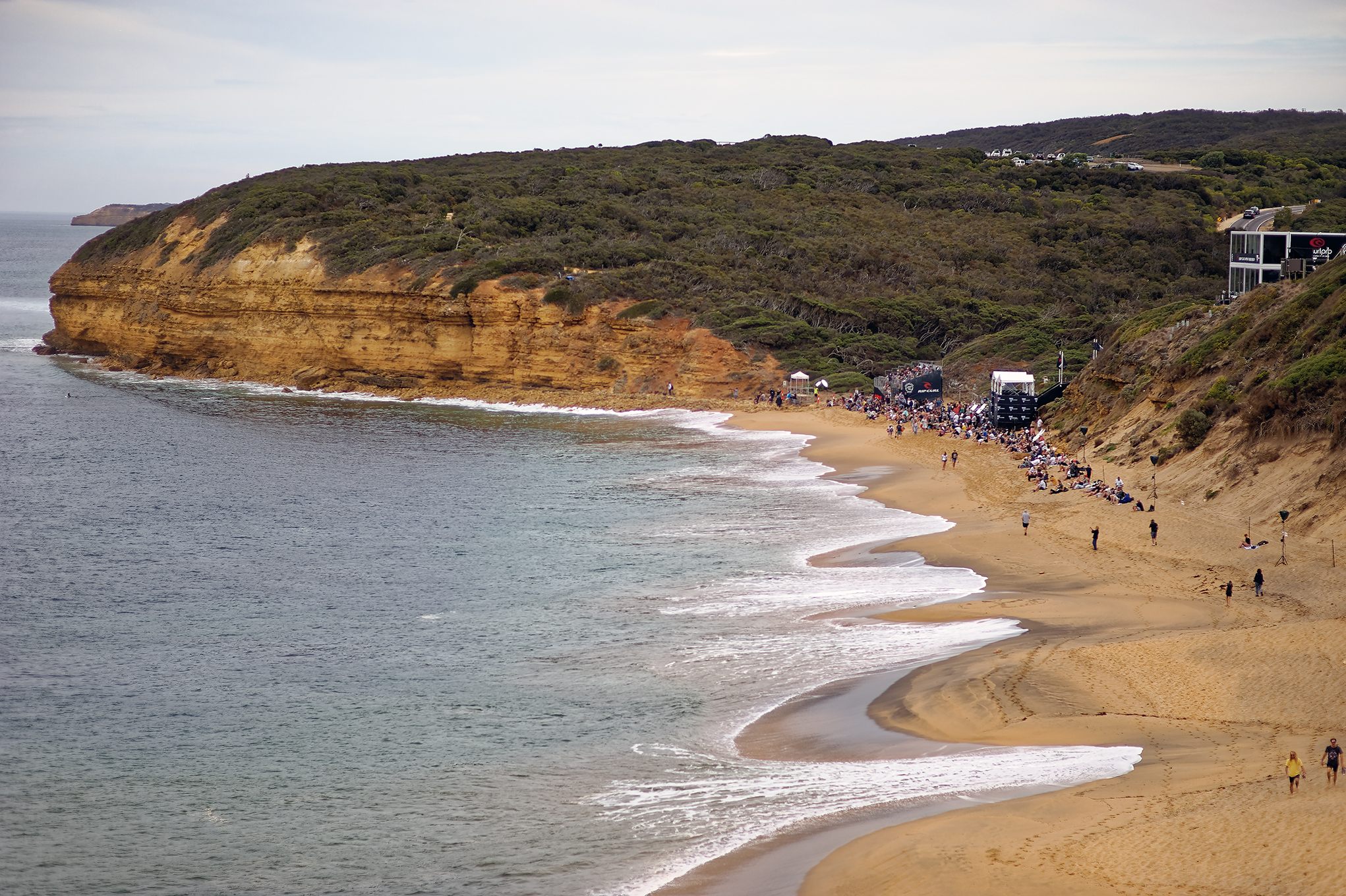
- Bells Beach hosting the Rip Curl Pro 2019

- Coordinates: 38°22′S 144°17′E
- Country: Australia
- State: Victoria
- LGA: Surf Coast Shire
- Location: 86 km (53 mi) SW of Melbourne; 25 km (16 mi) S of Geelong; 13 km (8.1 mi) NE of Anglesea; 5 km (3.1 mi) SW of Torquay

Government
  - State electorates: Polwarth; South Barwon
  - Federal division: Corangamite
- Elevation: 12 m (39 ft)

Population
  - Total: 130 (2016 census)
- Postcode: 3228
Localities around Bells Beach
Bellbrae	Bellbrae	Jan Juc
Anglesea	Bells Beach	Bass Strait
Bass Strait	Bass Strait	Bass Strait

Aerial views of Bells Beach.

Bells Beach.

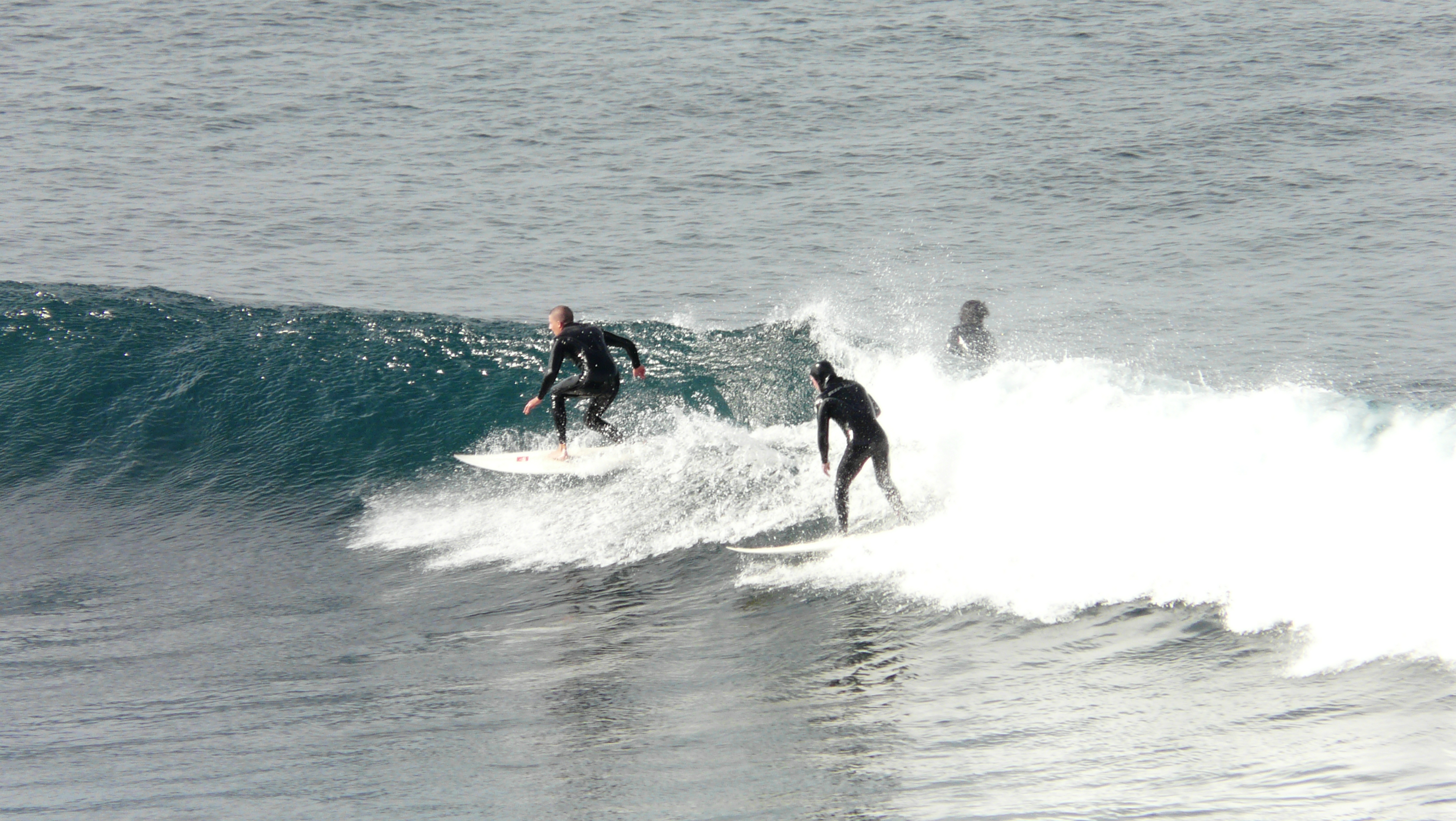
Surfers at the beach

Bells Beach is a locality in Surf Coast Shire, Victoria, Australia. It is a popular surf beach, located 100 km (62 mi) south-west of Melbourne, on the Great Ocean Road near the towns of Torquay and Jan Juc. The beach and coastal reserve are listed on the Victorian Heritage Register.

Bells Beach is named after William Bell, a Geelong businessman and grazier, who owned much of the property there from the 1840s. Many records wrongly accredit the location's name to John Calvert Bell of the family that took up a pastoral run there much later in 1905 and built the 'Addiscot' homestead. John Calvert Bell was, before that time, a resident at Calder Park, Mount Duneed, and not related to William Bell of Bells Beach.

In the 2016 Census, there were 130 people in Bells Beach, 88.7% of whom were born in Australia and 94.5% of whom spoke only English at home.

== Surfing ==
Bells Beach is the home of the world's longest continuously running pro surfing competition – now known as the Rip Curl Pro Bells Beach. The event was formerly known as the Bells Easter Classic (among a variety of other titles). The competition was first held in January 1962 and then at Easter every year since, although occasionally, when conditions at Bells aren't suitable, the competition has been transferred to other breaks such as Johanna and Woolamai.

As early as 1939, surfers from Torquay made their way to Bells but access was a considerable problem until 1960, when Torquay surfers and Olympic wrestler Joe Sweeney hired a bulldozer and cleared a road along the Bells cliff from the Cobb & Co Road, where the concrete wave now stands, down to the beach. He charged one pound per surfer to recover his expenses. This is now part of the Surf Coast walking track.

Nearby surf breaks include "Southside", "Centreside", "Rincon", "Winki Pop", (Uppers and Lowers), "Boobs" and "Steps". Although Bells is known internationally as one of the best breaks in Victoria, "Winki Pop" often works better under more diverse conditions than the other nearby breaks.

The first "Surfboard Rally" at Bells Beach was organised by surfing pioneers Peter Troy and Vic Tantau to help promote sales of T Boards, their own brand. Planned to run in December 1961 the event was postponed until 26 January 1962. From the following year the Australian Surfriders Association - ASA (Victorian Branch) - now called Surfing Victoria -hosted and staged the annual surfing competition at Bells Beach held at Easter each year. The ASA also ran the conservation contest at Bells Beach which included tree planting in an effort to help preserve natural values every year since the mid-1970s.

=== Surfing competitions ===
- Rip Curl GromSearch National Series (under 17s)
- Rip Curl Pro every Easter since 1962

=== Surfers Appreciating the Natural Environment (SANE) ===
In 1988 a group of local surfers who were concerned about the human impact that tourism was having on the Bells Beach Surfing Reserve started a group called Surfers Appreciating the Natural Environment. Since 1988 they have met monthly to revegetate the reserve in an effort to bring it back to its original state. They have planted over 100,000 plants there to date.

== In popular culture ==
Although the final scene of the film Point Break is set at Bells Beach, the scene was not filmed there. Bells Beach is a straight stretch and the beach in the film is a cove with spruce trees atop a hill. The actual location of the film was Indian Beach in Ecola State Park located in Cannon Beach, Oregon in the United States.

Geoffrey Wright filmed the final scene of the 1992 Australian picture Romper Stomper at Bell’s Beach. In the scene, the main protagonist Hando (played by Russell Crowe) confronts the characters Davey and Gabrielle.

Bells Beach is visited in the 1966 documentary film The Endless Summer.

In the 2007 animation film Surf's Up, the Australian surfer is shown to be from Bells Beach.

== See also ==
- Addiscot Beach
- Jan Juc Beach
- Torquay Surf Beach
- Torquay Front Beach
- Thirteenth Beach
- Bancoora Beach
