= Danger Danger (disambiguation) =

Danger Danger are an American hard rock band formed in 1986.

Danger Danger may also refer to:

- Danger Danger (album), their eponymous debut, 1989
- "Danger Danger" (song), by Dom Dolla and Solomun featuring Skepta, 2026
- "Danger, Danger", song by Alan Schmuckler from the My Little Pony: A New Generation soundtrack, 2021

== See also ==
- Danger (disambiguation)
- Dangerous (disambiguation)
