= Point Danger =

Point Danger or Danger Point may refer:

== Places ==
=== Australia ===
- Point Danger (Tweed Heads), on the border of New South Wales and Queensland
- Point Danger (Portland, Victoria), in south-western Victoria
- Point Danger (Torquay), south-western Victoria

=== Other places ===
- Danger Point (County Devon), England, UK

== Facilities and structures ==
- Danger Point Lighthouse, Walker Bay, South Africa
- Point Danger Light, located at Point Danger (Tweed Heads) on the border of New South Wales and Queensland, Australia
