= Area D =

Area D may refer to:

- Area D (video game), a 1997 adventure video game
- Area D: Inō Ryōiki, a 2012 manga series
