= Offshore Festival =

Former annual music festival in Australia

Coordinates: 38°19′26.34″S 144°17′39.46″E

The Offshore Festival was a camp-out rock and alternative music festival held during Easter at a farm near Torquay, Victoria, Australia from the late 1990s to 2001. It was run by the same organisers as the Falls Festival, held at nearby Lorne on New Year's Eve. It interlinked with the Rip Curl Pro surfing event, held at nearby Bells Beach and festival ticketholders had free admission to the surfing event.

The festival reached its peak in 2000, when it sold a capacity of 20,000 tickets. The organizers moved the event to the Royal Melbourne Showgrounds (home of the Big Day Out) the following year.

== Artist lineups ==
Over the years, the Offshore Festival featured a large range of artists including Blink 182, Silverchair, Tool, Rollins Band, NOFX, Pennywise, L7, Primus, Cosmic Psychos, The Living End, Ben Harper and the Innocent Criminals, The Wailers Band and more.

== 1995 ==
Silverchair

== 1997 ==
Friday 28 March
Snout
The Living End
The Mark of Cain
Blink 182

Saturday 29 March
Def FX
Grinspoon

Sunday 30 March
The Sloths
Silverchair
Tool

== 1998 ==
Friday 10 April
Michael Franti & Spearhead
Pre Shrunk
Stereophonics
The Avalanches
The Living End
The Mavis's
Violetine

Saturday 11 April
Everclear
Front End Loader
Moler
MxPx
No Fun at All
Painters and Dockers
Sandpit
Snout
The Superjesus

Sunday 12 April
Good Riddance
L7
Mr Blonde
Primus
Sick of It All
The Cruel Sea
The Tea Party
The Wailers Band
Tomorrow People

== 1999 ==
Friday 2 April
28 Days
99 Reasons Why
Area-7
Beaverloop
Cosmic Psychos
Custard
Gerling
Guttermouth
Josh Abrahams
Moler
Pollyanna
Reel Big Fish
Shihad
Sonic Animation
The Celibate Rifles
The Cruel Sea
The Fauves

Saturday 3 April
Something for Kate
Blink 182

Sunday 4 April
Ben Harper and the Innocent Criminals
Regurgitator
The Jon Spencer Blues Explosion

== 2000 ==
Friday 21 April
28 Days
Grinspoon
Ozomatli

Saturday 22 April
Area-7
Michael Franti & Spearhead
NOFX
Pennywise
Royal Crown Revue
Testeagles

Sunday 23 April
Primus
Rollins Band
The Living End

== 2001 ==
Friday 13 April
Augie March
Ben Harper
Bomfunk MC's
Fatboy Slim
Frankenbok
H-Block 101
Machine Gun Fellatio
Resin Dogs
Superheist
You Am I

Sonic Jihad
