= Torquay, Victoria =

Torquay
- Town
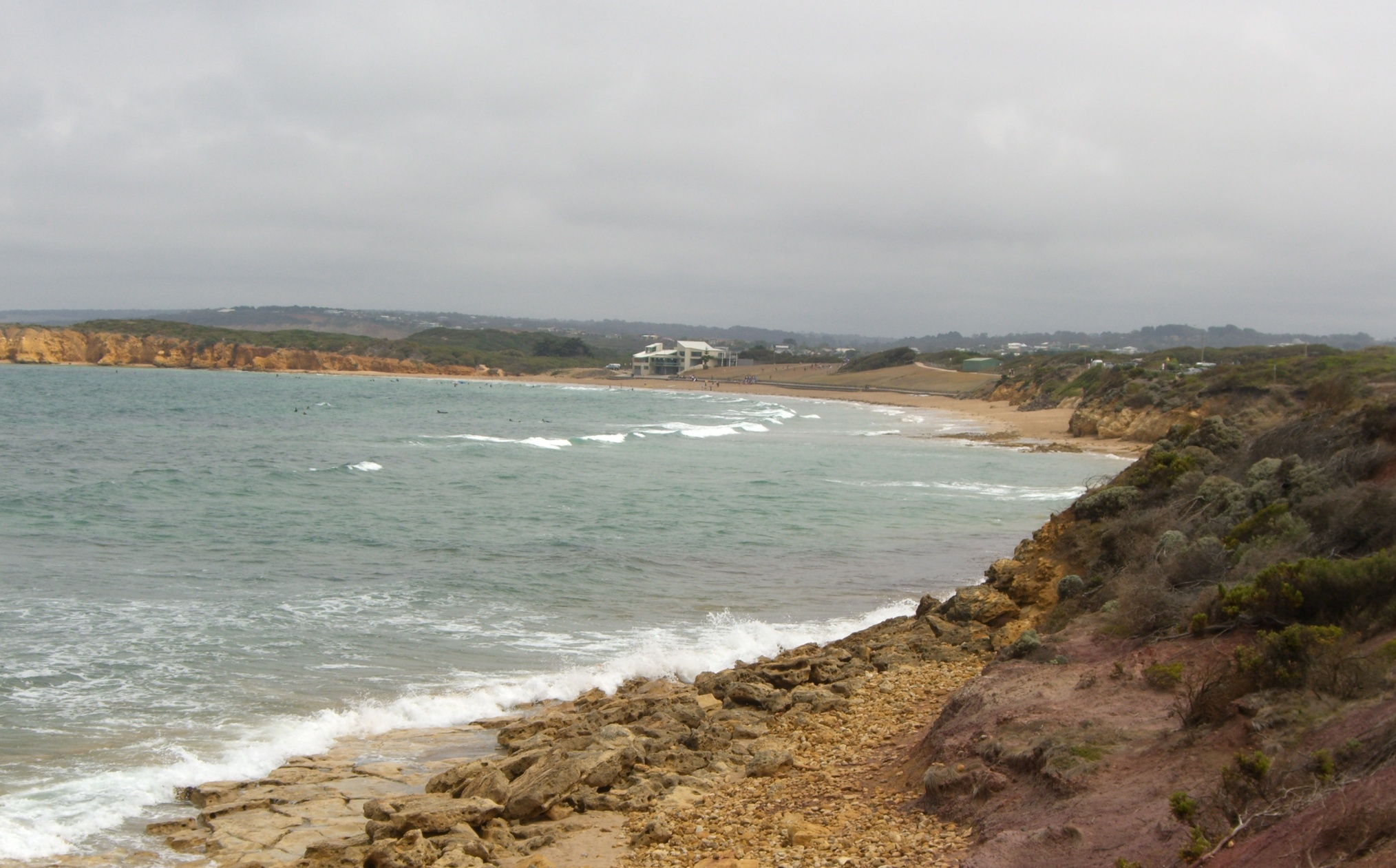
- View from Point Danger, looking towards the Torquay Surf Beach

- Coordinates: 38°20′0″S 144°19′0″E
- Country: Australia
- State: Victoria
- LGA: Surf Coast Shire
- Location: 97 km (60 mi) SW of Melbourne; 21 km (13 mi) S of Geelong; 18 km (11 mi) NE of Anglesea
- Established: 1871

Government
  - State electorate: Polwarth
  - Federal division: Corangamite

Area
  - Total: 34,306 km^{2} (13,246 sq mi)
- Elevation: 22 m (72 ft)

Population
  - Total: 18,534 (2021 census)
  - Density: 0.540255/km^{2} (1.39925/sq mi)
- Time zone: UTC+10
- Postcode: 3228
Localities around Torquay
Freshwater Creek	Mount Duneed	Connewarre
Bellbrae	Torquay	Breamlea
Jan Juc	Bass Strait	Bass Strait

Torquay (/tɔːˈkiː/ tor-KEY) is a town in Surf Coast Shire, Victoria, Australia, which faces Bass Strait, 21 km south of Geelong and is the gateway to the Great Ocean Road. It is bordered on the west by Spring Creek and its coastal features include Point Danger and Zeally Bay. At the 2021 census, Torquay had a population of 18,534.

== History ==
Torquay is situated on Wadawurrung country which is part of the Kulin nation that surrounds Port Phillip Bay. Wadawurrung have been living there for millennia.

The area that presently constitutes Torquay initially began as the outer reaches of pastoral properties, with Elias Harding occupying the area surrounding the present-day town centre, extending all the way to Point Addis, and William Neil occupying the 'South Beach' run, towards the north of the town. Robert Zeally, who had initially been based around Camperdown, took over control of the South Beach run.

From the 1860s, picnickers began to frequent the location, which was originally known as Spring Creek, after the watercourse along its south-western edge, but it was named Puebla in the 1882 Victorian Municipal Directory. James Follett, who settled there in 1871, came from Torquay, the seaside town in Devon, England, and at his suggestion the name Torquay was officially adopted in 1892. The Post Office opened on 20 August 1894. On 3 April 1908, the Spring Creek bridge was built, connecting the town to Anglesea.

The first shop in the town opened in 1890, and in 1891, the Pioneer Coffee Palace, opened by James Follett, gained a liquor license and was renamed to the Palace Hotel.

In 1891, the Joseph H. Scammell sailing ship struck the reef near Point Danger in Torquay and subsequently became wedged on the reef and as a result the ship broke up in the heavy seas. The cargo of the Scammell was washed onto the beach of Torquay and was looted. The anchors of the Scammell are still on display at the Torquay Front Beach and the Torquay boat ramp.

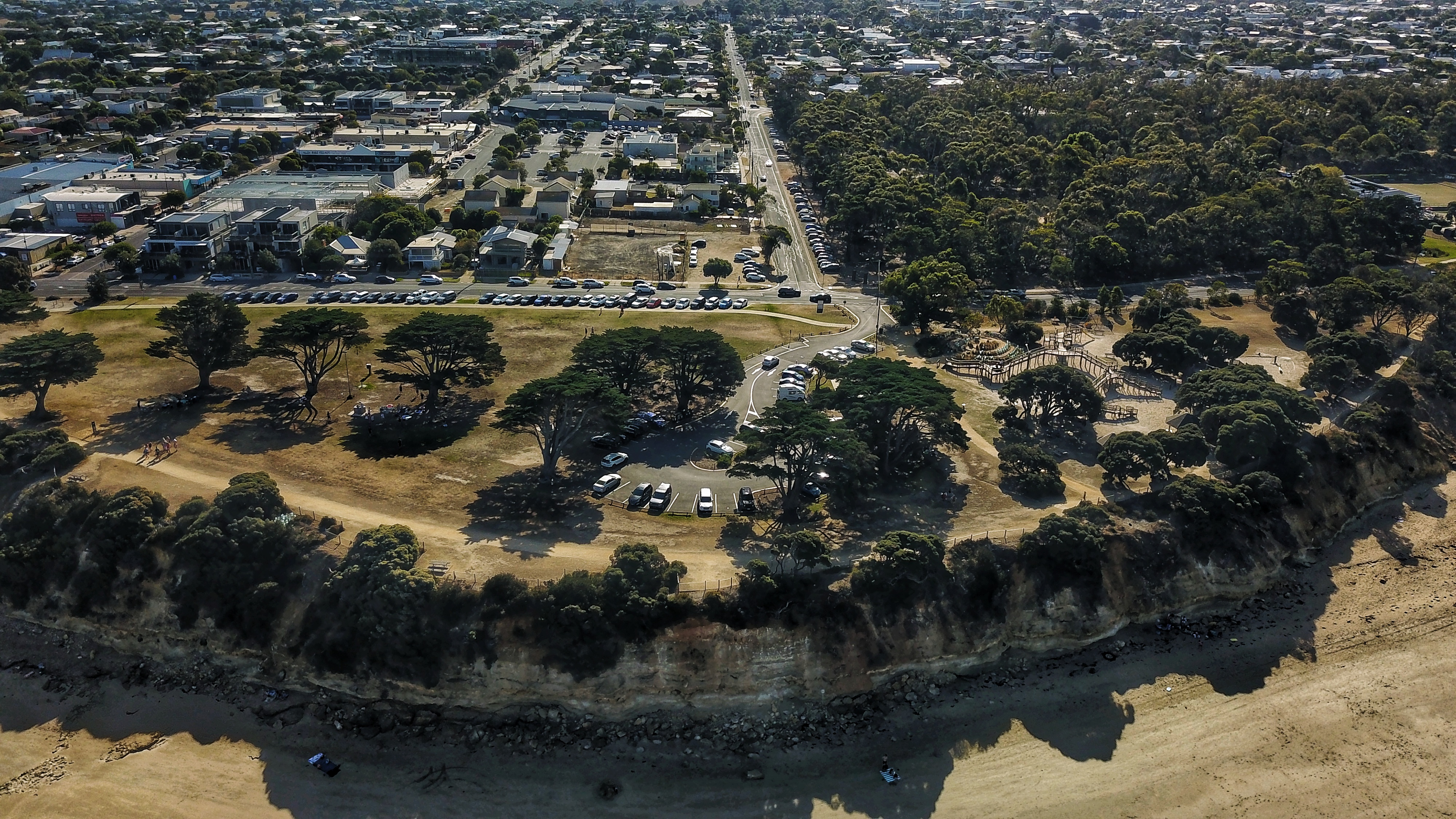
Torquay Beach from the air

In 1900, a primary school was opened in the newly built Presbyterian church, moving to the recreation hall in 1901, a permanent school building not opened until 1910. A bowling green, tennis courts and a golf course were opened by the 1920s. The town once had 145 bathing boxes on the main beach. In 1946, the Torquay Surf Life Saving Club was formed, opening their current clubrooms in 1971 after the previous one burnt down. Today, it is the oldest and largest club in Victoria.

In 1967, a surfboard shop was opened by Fred Pyke, where the brands Rip Curl, Quiksilver and Piping Hot began.

Recent years have seen increased development of the area and illegal consumption. With the 'old town' between the highway and the beach almost fully developed, housing spread to Jan Juc, west of Spring Creek, in the 1970s, and new estates opened up to the north of the town after the 1980s. There was conflict between long-term residents and those behind some developments, in particular over the former Torquay Primary School site on Bristol and Boston Roads, which was sold by the government for luxury apartments and an expanded shopping centre, instead of being retained for community uses. In 2001, The Sands golf club and residential development commenced construction to the north west of the town on the site of the former Torquay Tip, which closed in the early 1990s. The resort opened in 2004.

The magazine History Matters produced by Torquay Museum Without Walls continues to document the history of Torquay.

== Climate ==
Torquay has an oceanic climate (Köppen climate classification: Cfb), with warm-summer Mediterranean climate tendencies (Köppen climate classification: Csb). Summers are warm, though just barely with cool nights. Winters consist of cool days with chilly nights.

Climate data for Torquay, Victoria
Month	Jan	Feb	Mar	Apr	May	Jun	Jul	Aug	Sep	Oct	Nov	Dec	Year
Mean daily maximum °C (°F)	22.4 (72.3)	23.0 (73.4)	21.7 (71.1)	19.3 (66.7)	16.4 (61.5)	14.1 (57.4)	13.5 (56.3)	14.4 (57.9)	15.9 (60.6)	17.7 (63.9)	19.2 (66.6)	20.9 (69.6)	18.2 (64.8)
Mean daily minimum °C (°F)	14.4 (57.9)	15.2 (59.4)	13.9 (57.0)	11.7 (53.1)	9.5 (49.1)	7.2 (45.0)	6.2 (43.2)	6.8 (44.2)	8.1 (46.6)	9.7 (49.5)	11.1 (52.0)	12.9 (55.2)	10.6 (51.0)
Average precipitation mm (inches)	41.3 (1.63)	43.4 (1.71)	40.5 (1.59)	50.0 (1.97)	76.8 (3.02)	55.0 (2.17)	59.1 (2.33)	71.6 (2.82)	68.2 (2.69)	65.0 (2.56)	49.9 (1.96)	40.5 (1.59)	661.3 (26.04)
Source: Travel Victoria

== Attractions ==
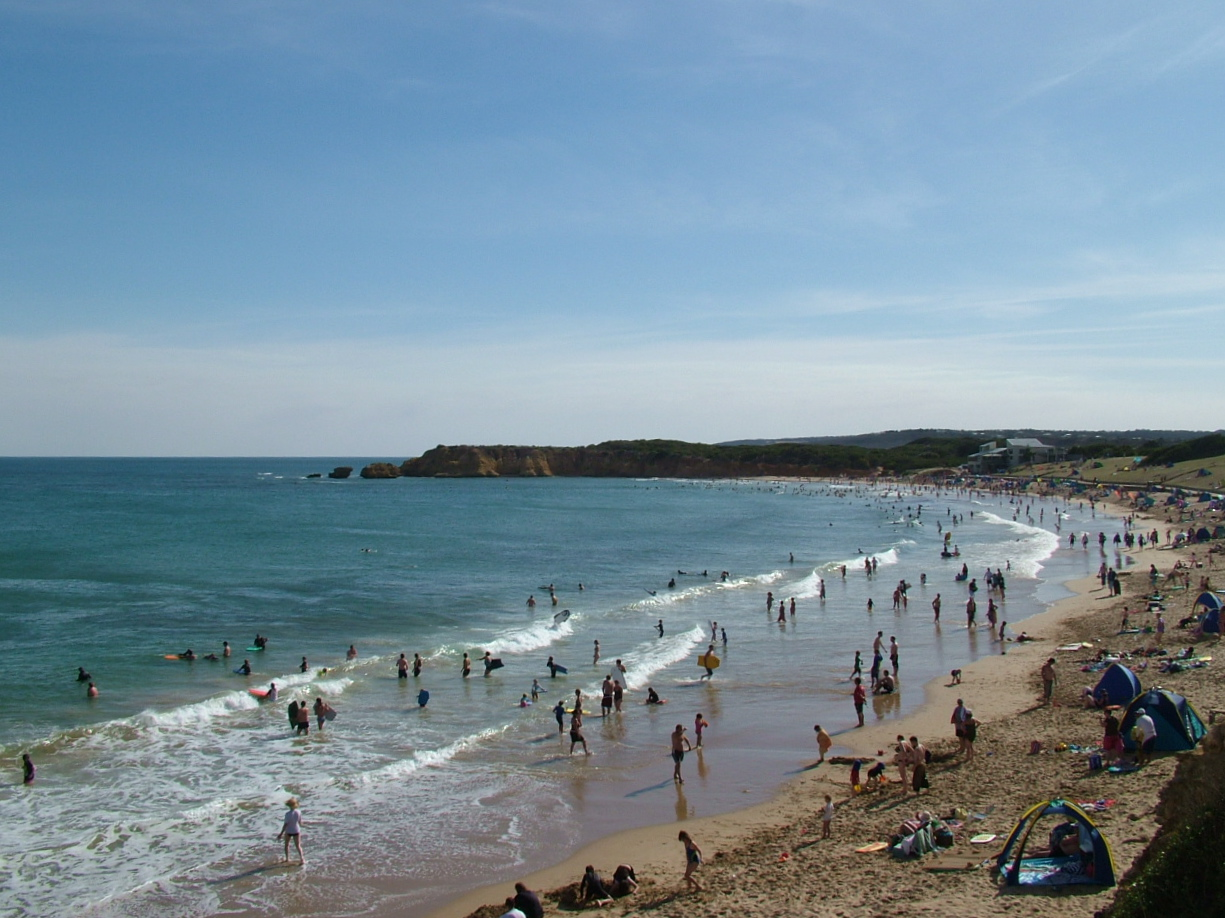
Torquay Surf Beach

The Torquay area is famous for its surf beaches, with Jan Juc and the world-famous Bells Beach located on the town's south-west outskirts. Other popular beaches are Point Impossible Beach and Southside Beach. It was home to the popular Offshore Festival in the late 1990s. Many of the world's most famous surf companies have their home in Torquay, including Rip Curl and Quiksilver, all of which make up part of the Surf Coast Plaza, which provides shopping and eating, as well as the Surf World Museum.

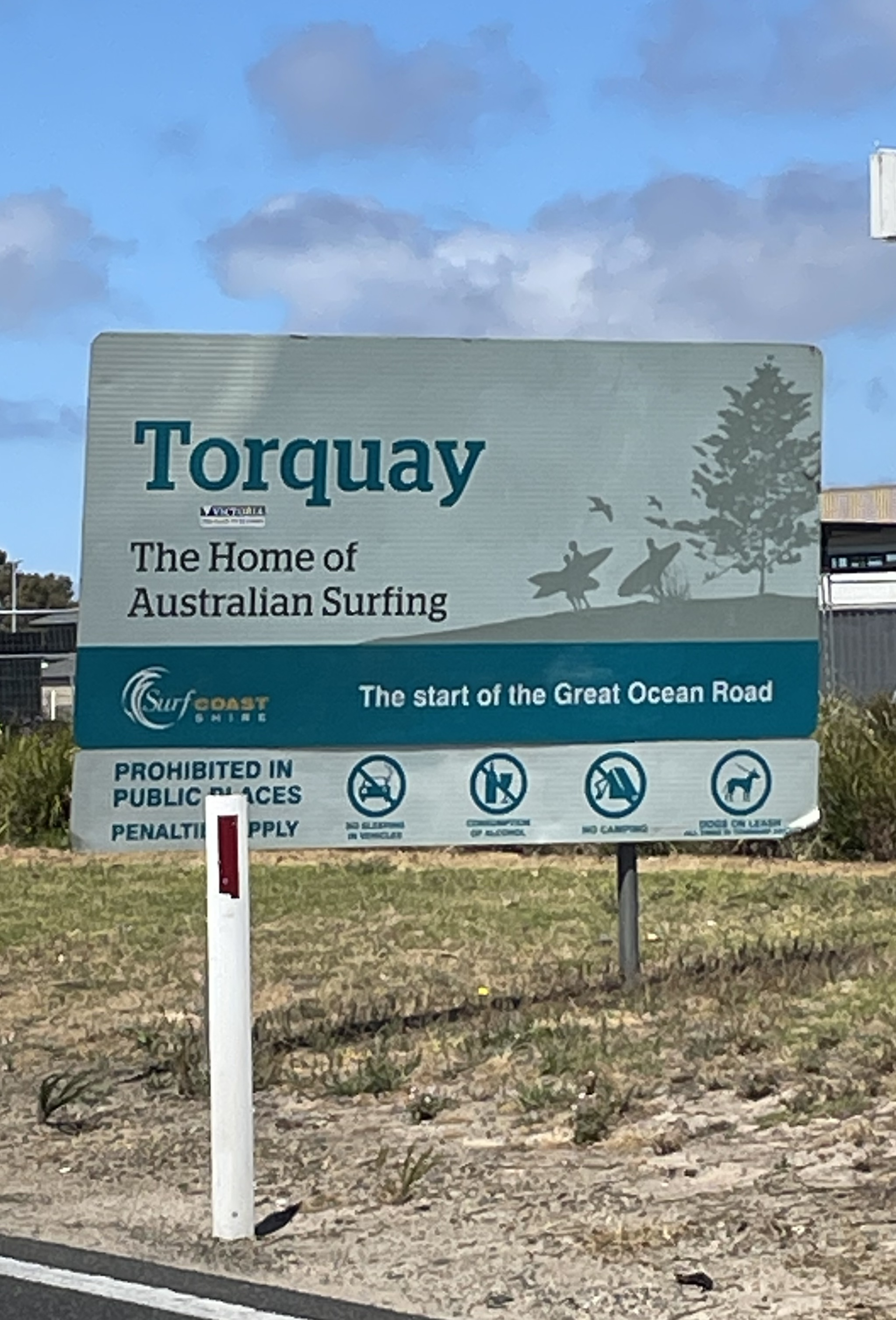
Road sign entering Torquay from Geelong: "The Home of Australian Surfing"

Torquay's population usually triples between January and end of February, when the school holidays end; the town also hosts end of year schoolies week celebrations, jointly with Lorne, Victoria's most active schoolies week destination.

The Australian National Surfing Museum is also located in Torquay.

== Palaeontology ==
The Torquay area is the location of two significant fossil strata, the Jan Juc Formation of the late Oligocene and the Puebla Formation of the early Miocene. Significant numbers of marine fossils have been discovered in the area.

== Facilities ==
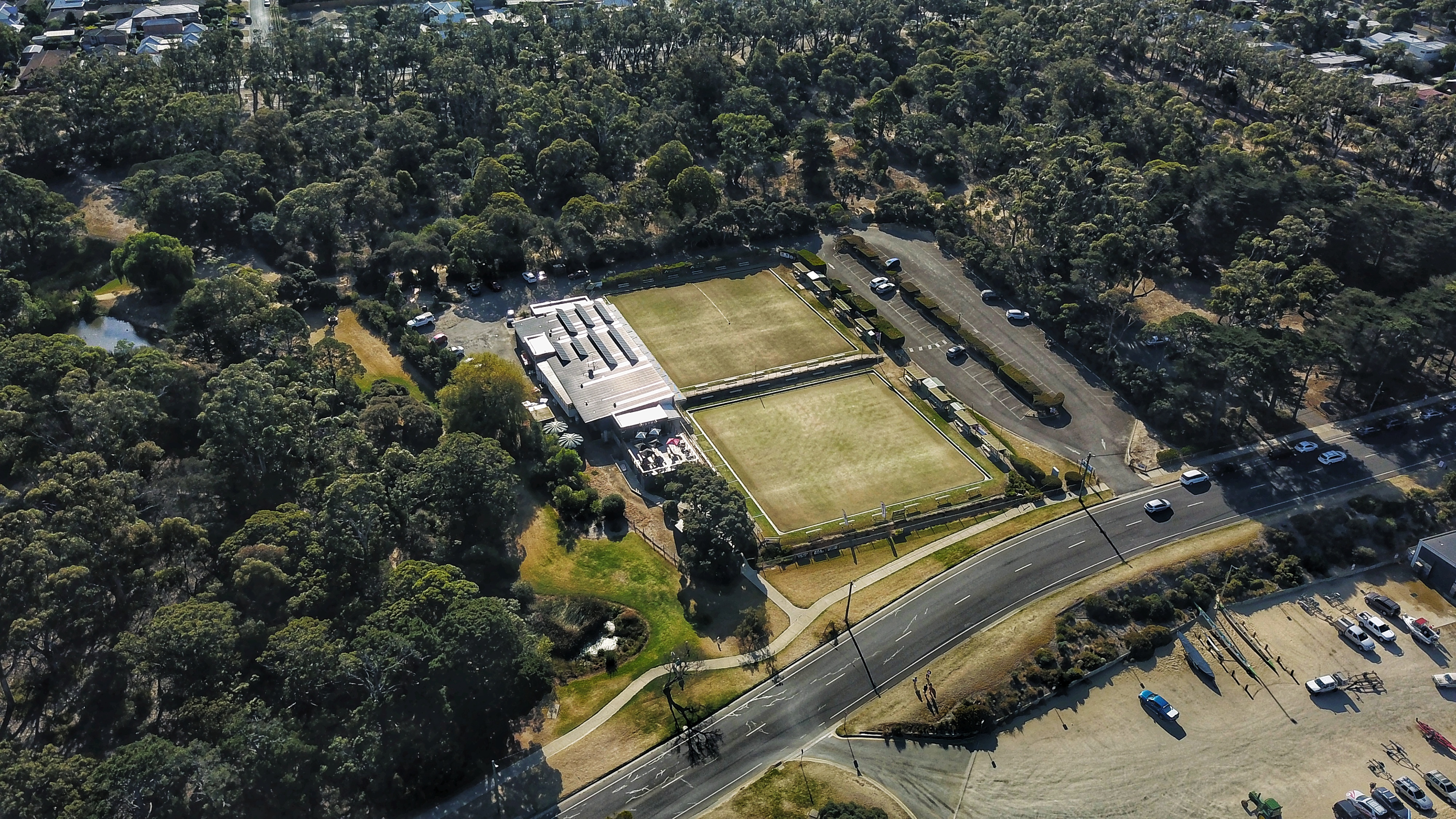
Aerial perspective of Torquay Bowls Club. March 2019

Torquay's local schools are Torquay College (primary school), St. Therese Catholic Primary School, Torquay Coast Primary School, Lisieux Catholic Primary School and Surf Coast Secondary College.

Torquay Primary School was once located in the 'old town', being moved across from St. Therese in October 2001. The same year a review on the provision of secondary schooling in Torquay was commenced, and in 2003 it was recommended that Torquay Primary School become a P-9 school (Torquay College) doing so in 2009; in 2012 it reverted to a standalone primary school. The secondary years split from Torquay College in 2012 to form Surf Coast Secondary College which moved to a standalone campus in Torquay North at the start of 2014.

In October 2007, The new Torquay Police Station opened at the corner of Surf Coast Highway and Central Avenue. The new police station was built at a cost of $7.8 million and is considered to be a state-of-the-art facility.

== Areas of Torquay ==
=== Frog Hollow ===
Frog Hollow is in the north west of Torquay.

The estate has been developed on the site of a water catchment which has been drained.

=== Ocean Views ===
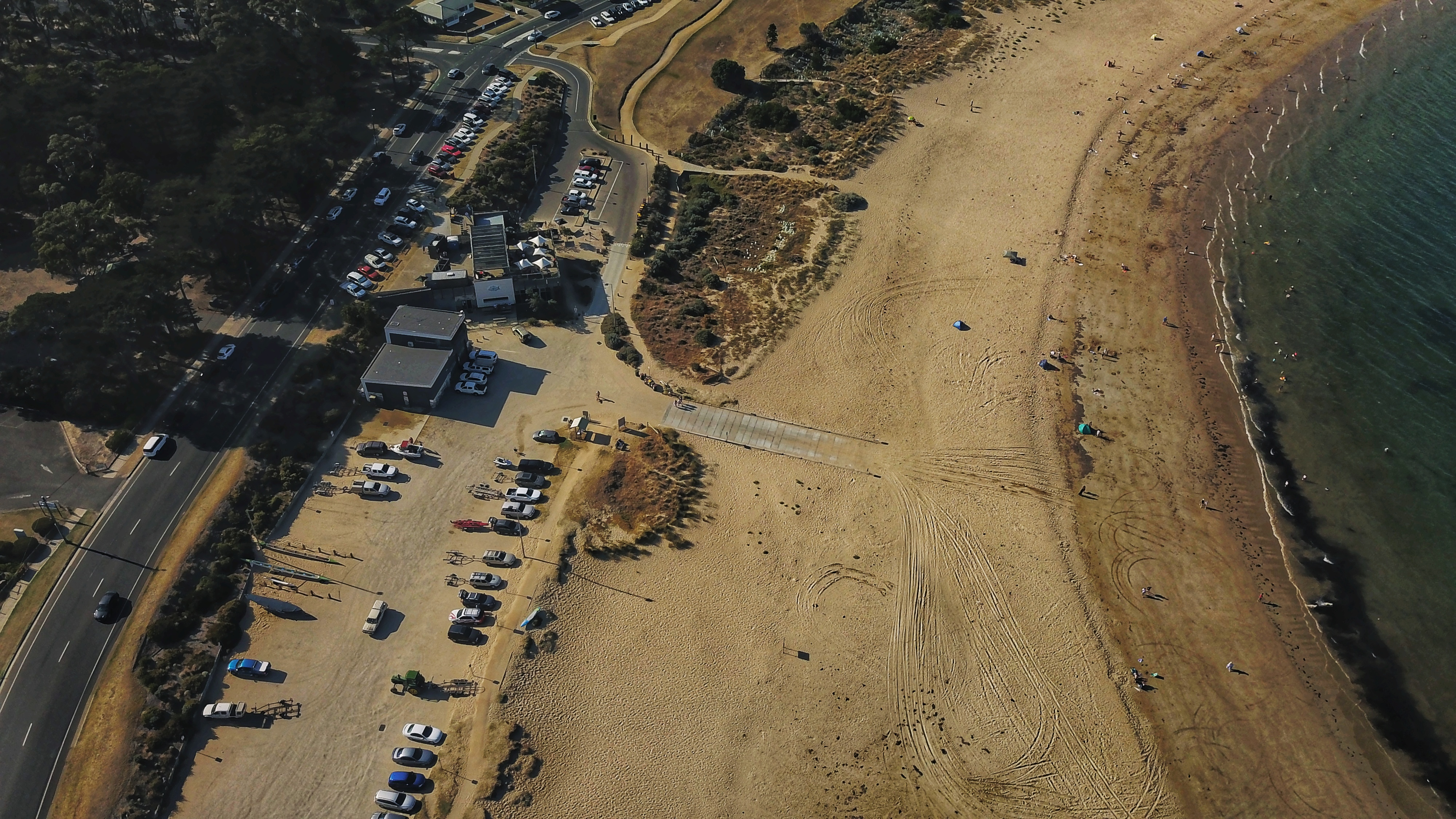
Aerial perspective of Fishermans' Beach at Torquay, March 2019

Ocean Views is in the south of Torquay.

The area was developed from 2000 when the first homes were built. It was originally a sheep and cattle grazing and farming area, known as Hard Man's land because of its rocky and hilly landscape making it difficult to graze on.

It is now primarily residential, backing onto Spring Creek, where a proposed development with capacity for another 20,000 people was rejected in April 2009. It has a football oval and a golf club backing onto it.

The area has a V-line bus stop, the bus running to Warrnambool or to Geelong, three summer bus run stops, a post office box and a park, Spring Creek Play Park (locally known as Froggy Park). Walking access across the river to the football ground used to be difficult until in 2007 the shire built a footbridge connecting the reserve and the edge of the suburb, which is only around a 1.5 km radius. Ocean Views also have a BMX park.

The area is known for its high number of families.

=== Wombah Park ===
Wombah Park is in the north east of Torquay and is home to about 1000 residents.

=== The Church Estate ===
Once owned by the Catholic Church, The Church Estate is bounded by Spring Creek Reserve, Spring Creek and Torquay Road and was developed in the 1960s.

=== Zeally Bay ===
Zeally Bay is east of Torquay. The bay and Zeally Point were named after Richard Zeally, a squatter who lived in the area from 1851 on his property named South Beach. Zeally Bay hosts a yachting club, a fishing club, Fishermans Beach, Taylor Park - a public 4-acre (16,000 m^{2}) park and the Crowne Plaza Torquay, a multimillion-dollar resort and plaza which was built on the site of the old Zeally Bay Caravan Park. In 2004 the Zeally Bay caravan park had been sold by the owners due to increasing land tax costs, to a developer who said they would build a retirement village.

== Sport ==
Torquay is best known for the sport of surfing. Popular surf spots include Torquay Surf Beach, Draino's and Fisho's. The Torquay Boardriders Club represents Torquay surfers in local and national competitions.

The town has an Australian Rules football team, the Torquay Tigers, competing in the Bellarine Football League playing their home games at Spring Creek Reserve. There is also a Youth Football and Netball Club, Surf Coast Suns, based at the Banyul-Warri Fields sporting precinct, the club was formed in 2016.

Soccer club Surf Coast FC play at Banyul Warri sporting precinct. The senior men's team play in the Victorian state league while the juniors play in the Geelong community competition.

Golfers play at the course of the RACV Torquay Golf Club on Great Ocean Road, or at The Sands Torquay on Sands Boulevard, an 18-hole championship course designed by Australian golfer Stuart Appleby.

== Popular culture ==
Bells Beach, near Torquay, is the setting for the final part of the 1991 film Point Break, starring Patrick Swayze and Keanu Reeves, although no filming took place there.

The town was the primary setting for the 2013 film Blinder.
