= Dangers =

Dangers may refer to:

- Dangers, Eure-et-Loir, a commune in north-central France
- Dangers (band), American hardcore punk band
- Jack Dangers (born 1965), English musician

== See also ==
- Danger (disambiguation)
