= Danger Island =

Danger Island or Danger Islands may refer to:

== Places ==
- Danger Island, Great Chagos Bank, part of Chagos Archipelago in Indian Ocean
- Danger Island, now known as Pukapuka, an atoll of Cook Islands in the Pacific Ocean
- Danger Islands, near the tip of the Antarctic Peninsula in the Southern Ocean

== Film and television ==
- Danger Island (serial), 1931 American film
- Mr. Moto in Danger Island, 1939 American mystery film
- Danger Island (TV series), 1968 American children's serial
- Danger Island (film), 1992 American TV film
- Danger Island (Archer), 9th season (2018) of American animated TV series

== Video games ==
- Danger Island (video game), a 1997 FMV game also known as Area D

== See also ==
- Dangar Island, island in New South Wales
