= Dangerously =

Dangerously may refer to:

- "Dangerously" (song), by Charlie Puth on Nine Track Mind (2016)
- Jesse Dangerously (born 1979), Canadian alternative hip hop artist
- Johnny Dangerously, a fictional character

== See also ==
- Dangerous (disambiguation)
