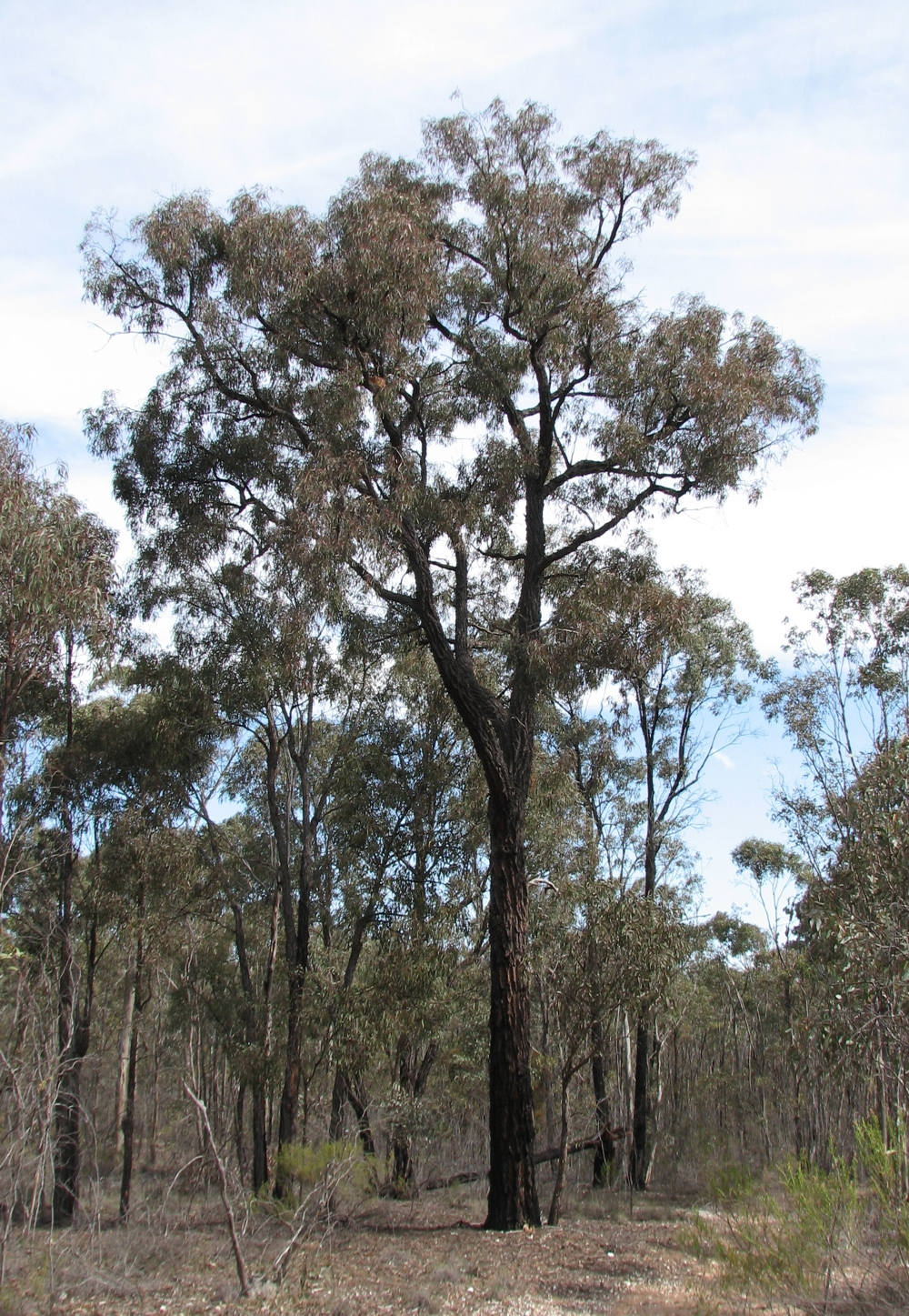
- Eucalyptus tricarpa in Paddys Ranges State Park

Scientific classification
- Kingdom: Plantae
- Clade: Embryophytes
- Clade: Tracheophytes
- Clade: Spermatophytes
- Clade: Angiosperms
- Clade: Eudicots
- Clade: Rosids
- Order: Myrtales
- Family: Myrtaceae
- Genus: Eucalyptus
- Subgenus: Eucalyptus subg. Symphyomyrtus
- Section: Eucalyptus sect. Adnataria
- Species: E. tricarpa

Binomial name
- Eucalyptus tricarpa (L.A.S.Johnson) L.A.S.Johnson & K.D.Hill

= Eucalyptus tricarpa =

Red ironbark

Species of eucalyptus

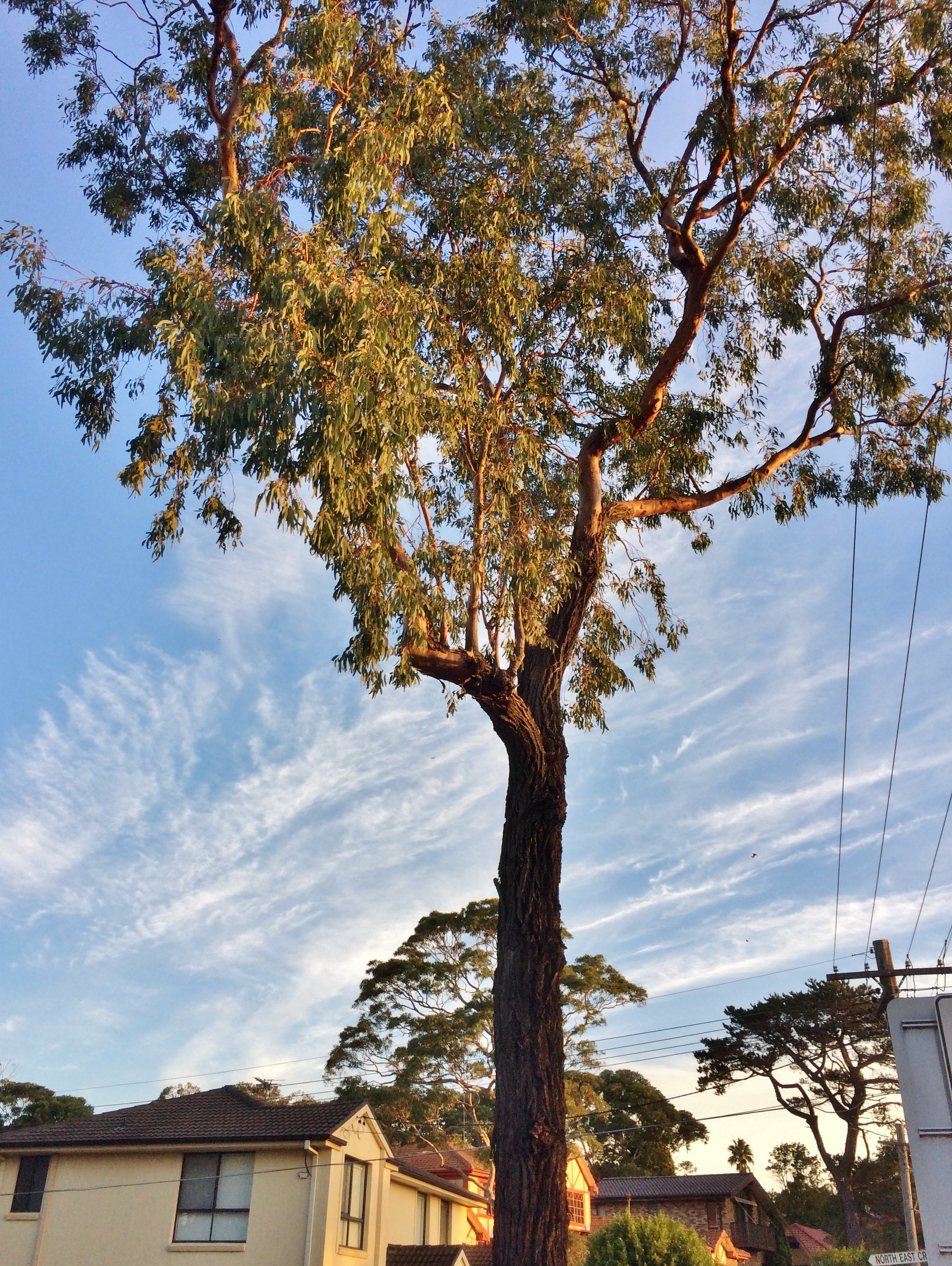
Red ironbark street tree Port Hacking, NSW

Eucalyptus tricarpa, commonly known as red ironbark or mugga ironbark, is a species of tree that is endemic to south-eastern Australia. It has thick, rough ironbark on the trunk and branches, lance-shaped adult leaves, flower buds usually in groups of three, white flowers and cylindrical or spherical fruit.

== Description ==
Eucalyptus tricarpa is a tree that typically grows to a height of 35 m (115 ft) and forms a lignotuber. It has thick rough, reddish brown to black ironbark on the trunk and branches. Young plants and coppice regrowth have green to greyish, elliptical to lance-shaped leaves that are 40–110 mm (1.6–4.3 in) long and 13–30 mm (0.51–1.18 in) wide and petiolate. Adult leaves are arranged alternately, the same shade of green to greyish green on both sides, lance-shaped to curved, 80–220 mm (3.1–8.7 in) long and 10–26 mm (0.39–1.02 in) wide, tapering to a petiole 10–30 mm (0.39–1.18 in) long. The flower buds are arranged in leaf axils in groups of three, sometimes seven, on an unbranched peduncle 8–15 mm (0.31–0.59 in) long, the individual buds on pedicels 5–18 mm (0.20–0.71 in) long. Mature buds are oval, 10–15 mm (0.39–0.59 in) long and 6–9 mm (0.24–0.35 in) wide with a conical to beaked operculum. Flowering occurs from February to November and the flowers are white or pale pink. The fruit is a woody cylindrical to shortened spherical capsule 8–13 mm (0.31–0.51 in) long and 8–15 mm (0.31–0.59 in) wide with the valves enclosed below the rim.

== Taxonomy and naming ==
The red ironbark was first formally described in 1962 by Lawrie Johnson who gave it the name Eucalyptus sideroxylon subsp. tricarpa and published the description in Contributions from the New South Wales National Herbarium. In 1991, Johnson and Ken Hill raised the subspecies to species level as E. tricarpa. The specific epithet (tricarpa) is from ancient Greek words meaning "three" and "fruit".

In 2004, Kevin James Rule described two subspecies and the names are accepted by the Australian Plant Census:

- Eucalyptus tricarpa subsp. decora Rule has pruinose seedlings, branchlets, and flower buds;
- Eucalyptus tricarpa (L.A.S.Johnson) L.A.S.Johnson & K.D.Hill subsp. tricarpa has no parts that are pruinose.

== Distribution and habitat ==
Eucalyptus tricarpa grows in forest and woodland in coastal south from Araluen in New South Wales and is common in the goldfields near Bendigo, near Anglesea and in coastal and near-coastal areas of Gippsland. Subspecies decora occurs in open woodland around St Arnaud in Victoria.

== Gallery ==
Features of the red ironbark (Eucalyptus tricarpa)
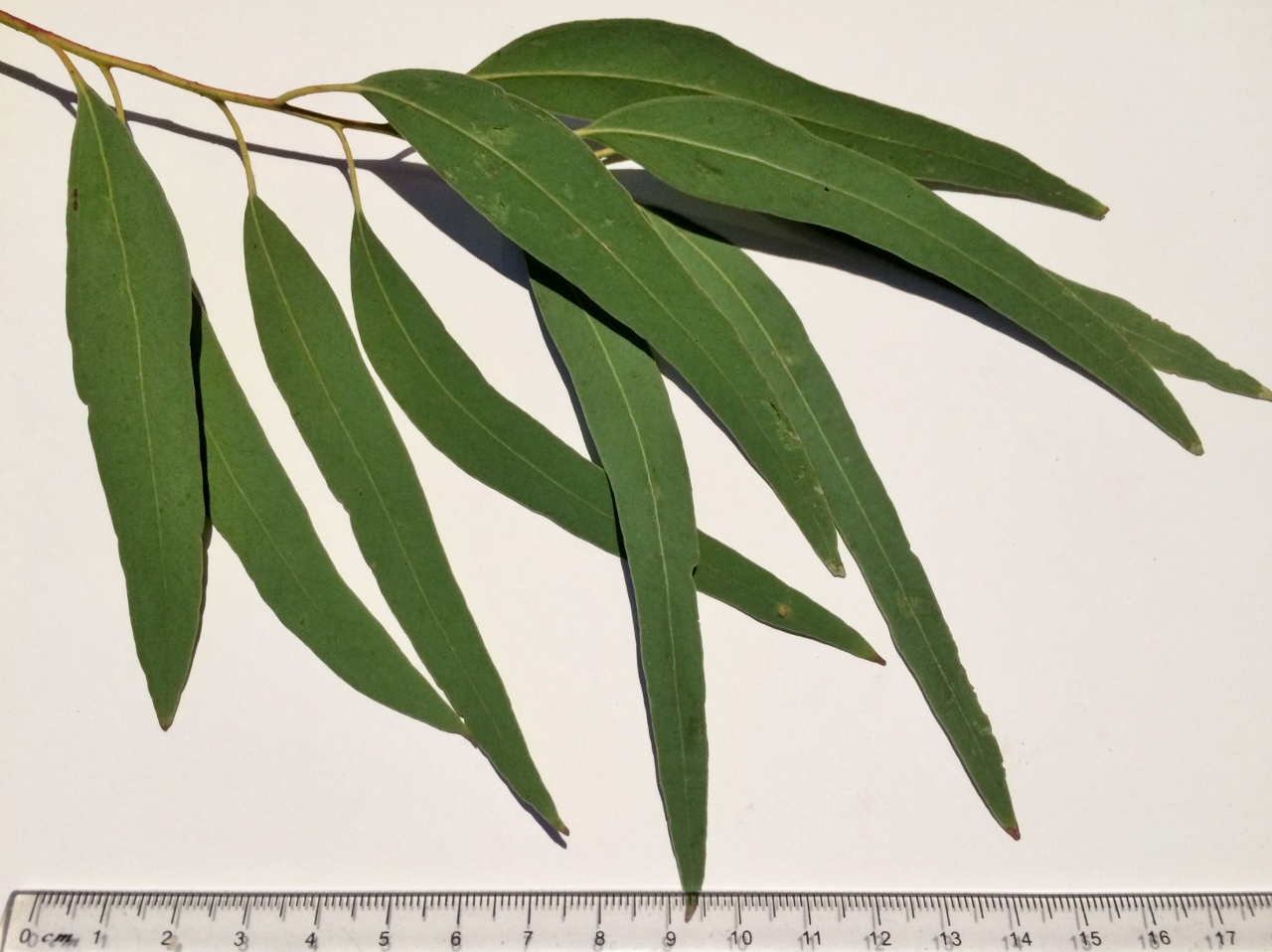
Adult leaves

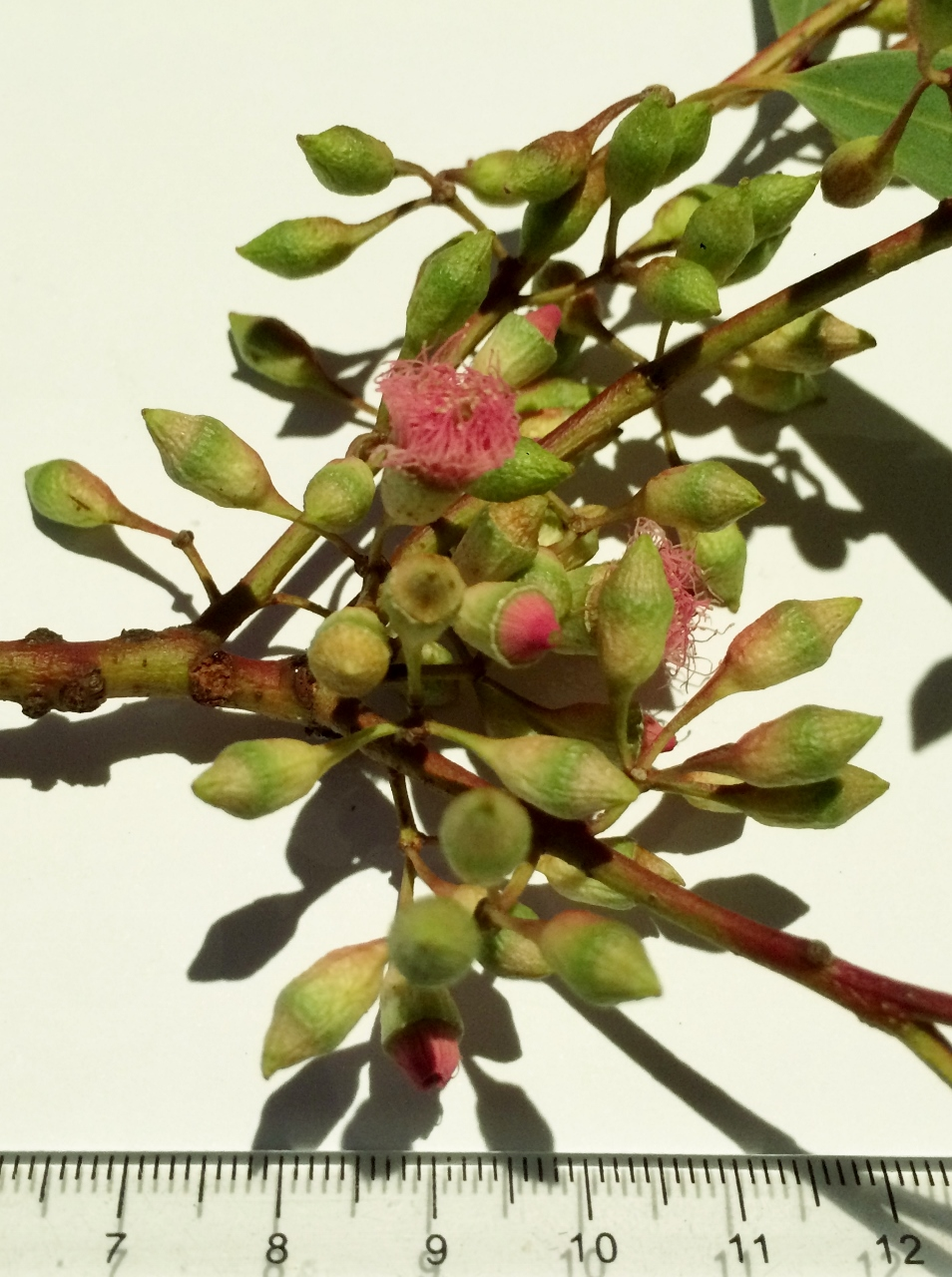
Inflorescence
(buds & flowers)

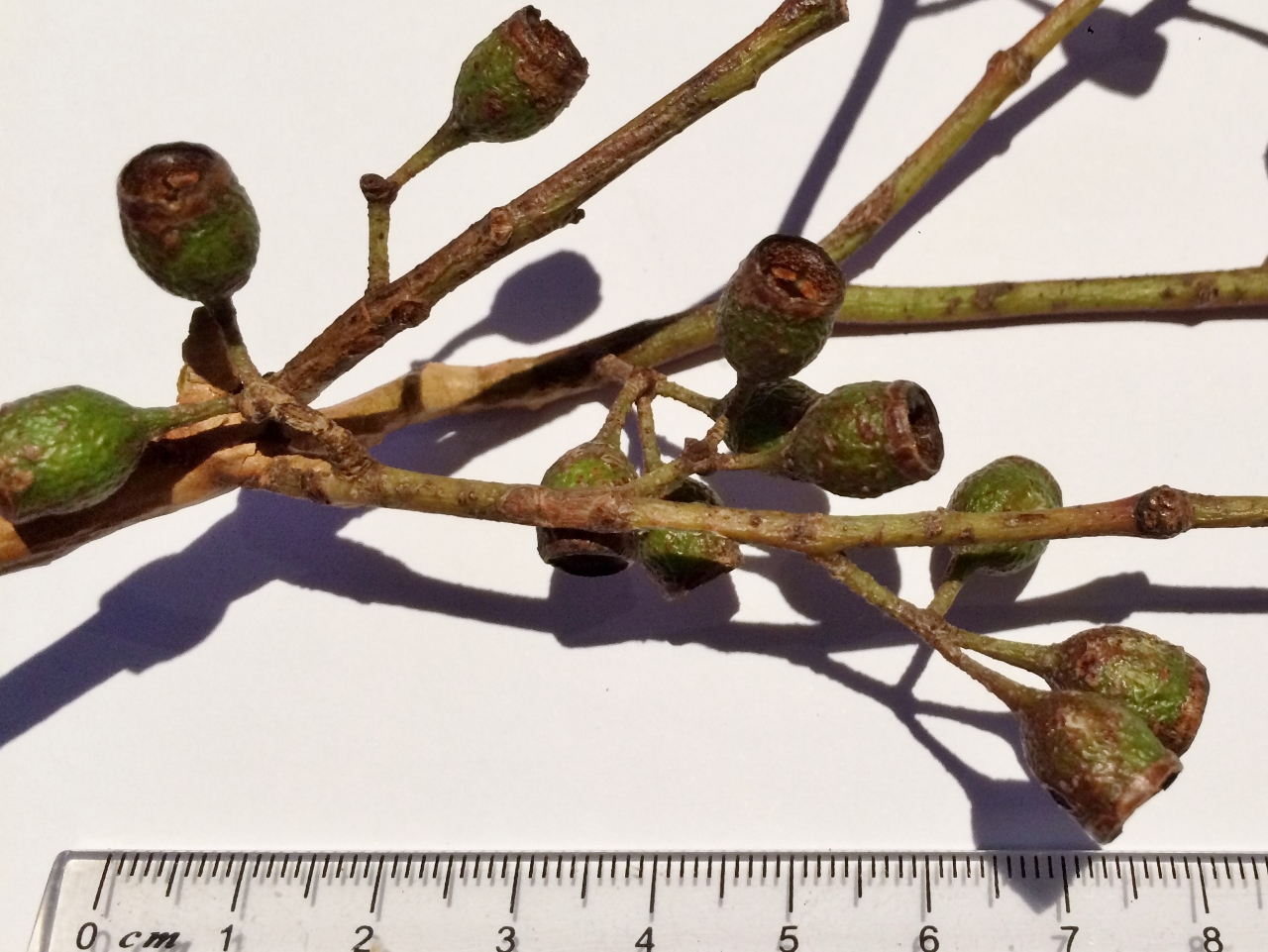
Fruit

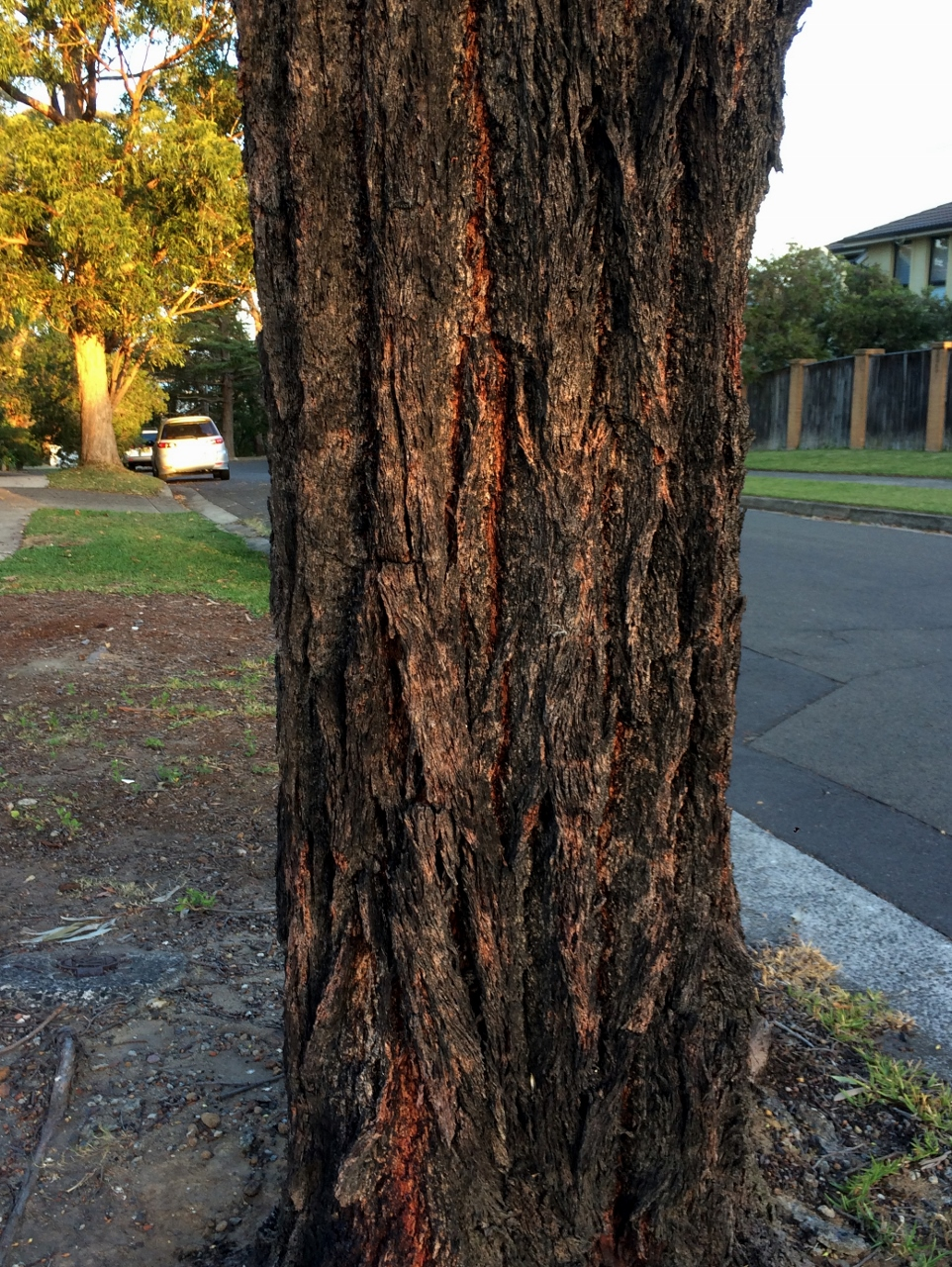
Trunk bark

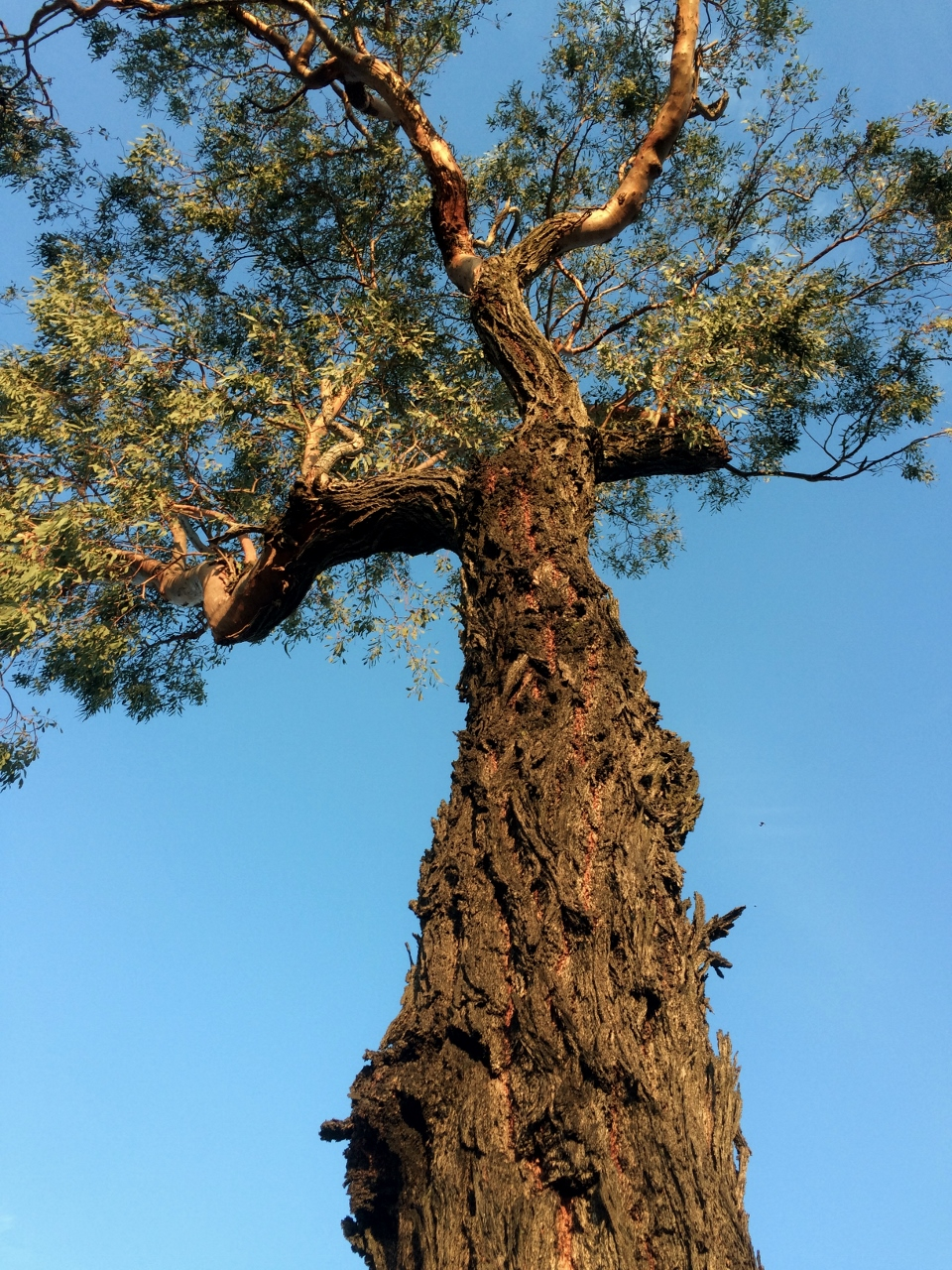
Upper branch bark

== See also ==
- List of Eucalyptus species
