= Dangerous =

Dangerous may refer to:

== Film and television ==
- Dangerous (1935 film), an American film starring Bette Davis
- Dangerous: The Short Films, a 1993 collection of music videos by Michael Jackson
- Dangerous (Australian TV series), a 2007 Australian drama
- Dangerous (Indian TV series), a 2020 Indian Hindi-language crime thriller
- Dangerous (2021 film), a Canadian-American action thriller
- Dangerous (2022 film), an Indian Hindi-language action drama film
- Dangerous Rangers, the Working Title of Danger Rangers an 2005 American animated series

== Music ==
- Dangerous!, an Australian punk band
- Dangerous World Tour, Michael Jackson's 1992–93 world concert tour
- Dangerous Records, a British record label associated with Sawmills Studios

=== Albums ===
- Dangerous (Andy Taylor album), 1990
- Dangerous (The Bar Kays album) or the title song, 1984
- Dangerous (Michael Jackson album) or the title song (see below), 1991
- Dangerous (Natalie Cole album) or the title song, 1985
- Dangerous (SpeXial album) or the title song, 2015
- Dangerous (Yandel album), 2015
- Dangerous: The Double Album, by Morgan Wallen, or the title song, 2021
- Dangerous, by DecembeRadio, or the title song, 2005
- Dangerous, by KJ-52, or the title song, 2012

=== Songs ===
- "Dangerous" (21 Savage, Lil Durk and Metro Boomin song), 2024
- "Dangerous" (Big Data song), 2013
- "Dangerous" (Busta Rhymes song), 1997
- "Dangerous" (Cascada song), 2009
- "Dangerous" (David Guetta song), 2014
- "Dangerous" (The Doobie Brothers song), 1991
- "Dangerous" (James Blunt song), 2011
- "Dangerous" (Kardinal Offishall feat. Akon song), 2008
- "Dangerous" (Loverboy song), 1985
- "Dangerous" (M. Pokora song), 2008
- "Dangerous" (Meek Mill song), 2018
- "Dangerous" (Michael Jackson song), 1991
- "Dangerous" (Penny Ford song), 1985
- "Dangerous" (Roxette song), 1989
- "Dangerous" (Rumer song), 2014
- "Dangerous" (S-X song), 2020
- "Dangerous" (Seether song), 2020
- "Dangerous" (Sleep Token song), 2025
- "Dangerous" (Within Temptation song), 2013
- "Dangerous" (Ying Yang Twins song), 2006
- "Dangerous", by Before You Exit, 2014
- "Dangerous", by BoyNextDoor from 19.99, 2024
- "Dangerous", by Comethazine from Bawskee 3.5, 2019
- "Dangerous", by Def Leppard from Def Leppard, 2015
- "Dangerous", by Depeche Mode, B-side of "Personal Jesus", 1989
- "Dangerous", by Ella Mai from Ella Mai, 2018
- "Dangerous", by f(x) from Pinocchio, 2011
- "Dangerous", by Groove Coverage from Riot on the Dancefloor, 2012
- "Dangerous", by Group 1 Crew from Fearless, 2012
- "Dangerous", by Hailee Steinfeld from Sinners, 2025
- "Dangerous", by Jennifer Hudson from JHUD, 2014
- "Dangerous", by Jessie J from R.O.S.E., 2018
- "Dangerous", by Ladyhawke from Wild Things, 2016
- "Dangerous", by My American Heart Hiding Inside the Horrible Weather, 2007
- "Dangerous", by NEFFEX, 2018
- "Dangerous", by Nick Jonas from Spaceman, 2021
- "Dangerous", by S Club 7, B-side of "Have You Ever", 2001
- "Dangerous", by Schoolboy Q from Crash Talk, 2019
- "Dangerous", by Shinedown from Threat to Survival, 2015
- "Dangerous", by Shinee from The Misconceptions of Us, 2013
- "Dangerous", by Shaman's Harvest from Smokin' Hearts & Broken Guns, 2014
- "Dangerous", by Van Morrison from What's It Gonna Take?, 2022
- "Dangerous", by the Who, B-side of "It's Hard", 1982
- "Dangerous", by the xx from I See You, 2017
- "Dangerous", by Madison Beer, 2022
- "Dangerous", by Jorge Rivera-Herrans from Epic: The Musical

== Other uses ==
- Chris Dangerous (born 1978), Swedish musician
- Dangerous (Bill Hicks album), a comedy album, 1990
- Dangerous (book), a 2017 autobiography by Milo Yiannopoulos
- Dangerous (horse) (foaled 1830), a British Thoroughbred racehorse
- Dangerous Reef, in Spencer Gulf, South Australia

== See also ==
- , pages beginning with Dangerous in quotes
- Danger (disambiguation)
- Dangerously (disambiguation)
