= Brown stringybark =

Brown stringybark may refer to:

- Eucalyptus baxteri, native from New South Wales into Victoria
- Eucalyptus capitellata, native to New South Wales
