= Danger Zone =

Danger Zone, The Danger Zone, or Dangerzone may refer to:

== Film and television ==
- Danger Zone (1951 film), an American film noir by William Berke
- Danger Zone (1996 film), an American action film by Allan Eastman
- "Danger Zone" (Grey's Anatomy), a 2017 TV episode

== Music ==
=== Albums ===
- Danger Zone (Hardline album) or the title song, 2012
- Danger Zone (Lord Kossity album) or the title song, 2006
- Danger Zone (Sammy Hagar album) or the title song, 1980
- Danger Zone (EP), by China White, 1981
- The Danger Zone (album), by Big L, 2011
- Danger Zone, by Player, 1978
- Danger Zone, by Sinner, 1984
- Danger Zone, by Tuff Crew, 1988

=== Songs ===
- "Danger Zone" (song), by Kenny Loggins, 1986
- "Danger Zone", by Amaranthe from Massive Addictive, 2014
- "Danger Zone", by Black Sabbath from Seventh Star, 1986
- "Dangerzone", by Chris Sorbello, 2010
- "Danger Zone", by Crystal Gayle from Miss the Mississippi, 1979
- "Danger Zone", by Gwen Stefani from Love. Angel. Music. Baby., 2004
- "Danger Zone", by Nash the Slash from Children of the Night, 1981
- "Danger Zone", by Planet Patrol, 1984
- "Danger Zone", by Rainbow from Down to Earth, 1979
- "Danger Zone", by the Ramones from Too Tough to Die, 1984
- "Dangerzone", by Vanilla Ninja from Love Is War, 2006
- "Danger Zone", by the Vels from House of Miracles, 1986

== Video games ==
- Danger Zone (video game), a 2017 racing game
- Jurassic Park III: Danger Zone!, a 2001 action-adventure game
- "Danger Zone", an episode from the game Angry Birds Space

== Other ==
- Danger zone (food safety), the temperature range in which foodborne bacteria can grow
- Danger triangle of the face
- "Danger zone", the loose areolar connective tissue of the human scalp
- Danger Zone, a 1975 novel by Maurice Shadbolt
- The Danger Zone, a book series published by Salariya Book Company
