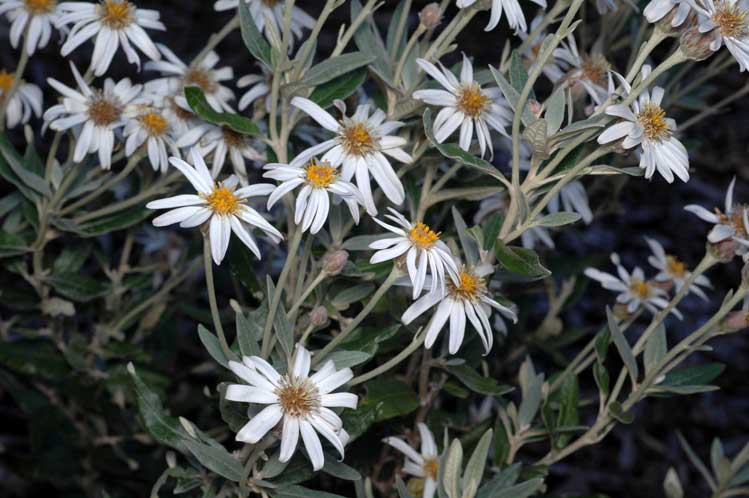
- Subspecies pannosa in the Australian National Botanic Gardens

Scientific classification
- Kingdom: Plantae
- Clade: Tracheophytes
- Clade: Angiosperms
- Clade: Eudicots
- Clade: Asterids
- Order: Asterales
- Family: Asteraceae
- Genus: Olearia
- Species: O. pannosa

Binomial name
- Olearia pannosa Hook.

Synonyms
- Aster pannosus (Hook.) F.Muell.; Eurybia pannosa (Hook.) F.Muell. nom. inval.; Olearia lanceolata Sond. nom. inval., pro syn.; Steetzia pannosa (Hook.) Sond.

= Olearia pannosa =

Species of plant

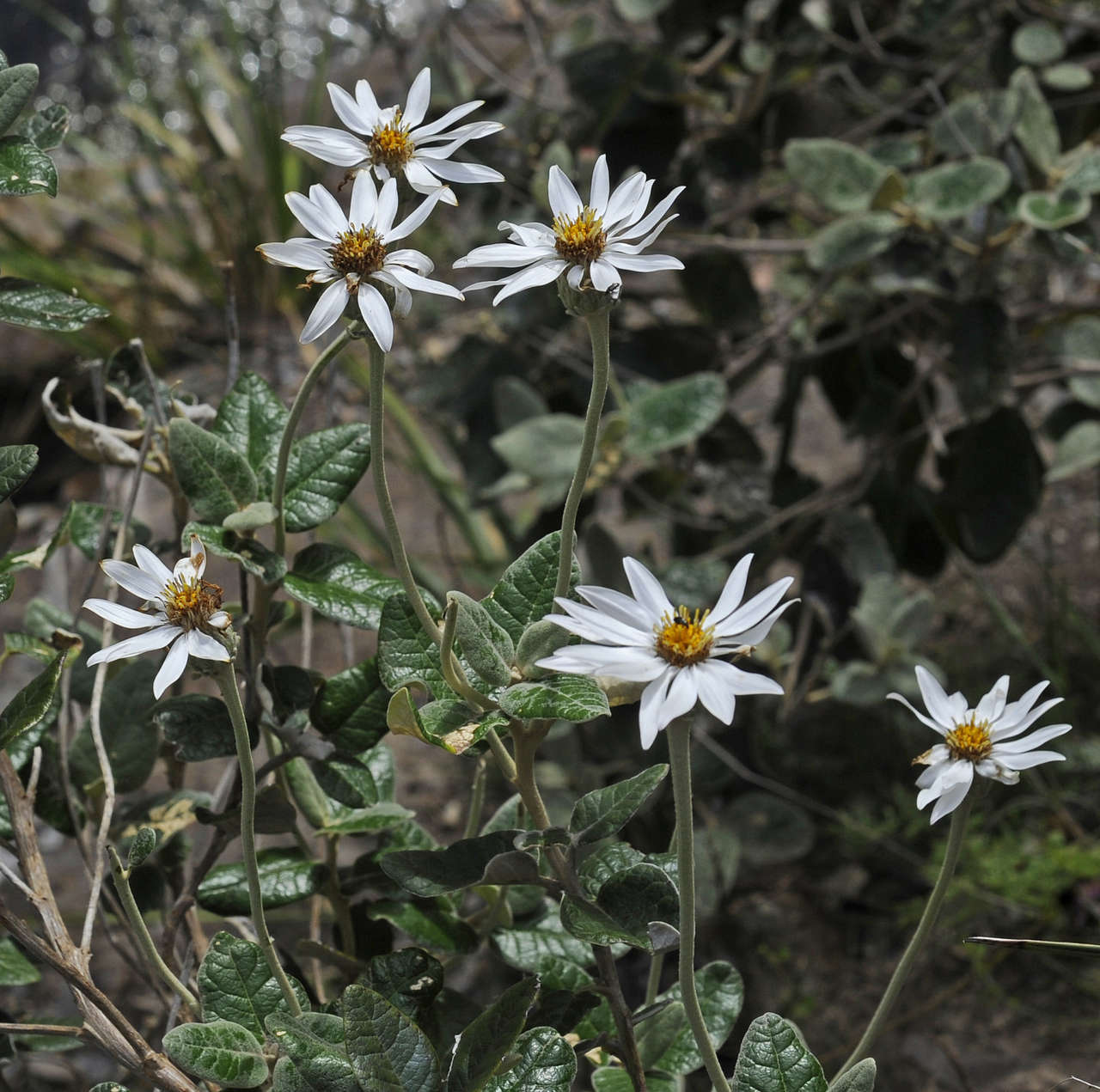
Subsp. cardiophylla near Staughton Vale

Olearia pannosa, commonly known as silver-leaved daisy or velvet daisy-bush, is a species of flowering plant in the family Asteraceae and is endemic to south-eastern continental Australia. It is a spreading undershrub or shrub with egg-shaped or heart-shaped leaves, and white and yellow daisy flowers.

== Description ==
Olearia pannosa is a spreading undershrub or shrub that typically grows to a height of up to 1 m (3 ft 3 in) and forms a root suckers. The branchlets are covered with woolly, Y-shaped hairs. The leaves are arranged alternately, egg-shaped or heart-shaped, 30–120 mm (1.2–4.7 in) long and 18–65 mm (0.71–2.56 in) wide on a petiole up to 22 mm (0.87 in) long, the upper surface becoming glabrous and the lower surface covered with hairs similar to those on the branchlets. The heads or daisy-like "flowers" are arranged singly on the ends of branches and are 35–75 mm (1.4–3.0 in) wide on a peduncle 5–25 mm (0.20–0.98 in) long, the involucre hemispherical and woolly-hairy. Each flower has 8 to 24 white ray florets and 18 to 50 yellow disc florets. Flowering occurs from September to November and the achenes are 5–8 mm (0.20–0.31 in) long, the pappus 8–10 mm (0.31–0.39 in) long.

== Taxonomy ==
Olearia pannosa was first formally described in 1852 by William Jackson Hooker in his Icones Plantarum from specimens collected near the Murray River in South Australia.

In 1853, Ferdinand von Mueller described Eurybia cardiophylla in the journal Linnaea from specimens collected on Mount Remarkable in South Australia, but in 1986, David Cooke reduced this species to Olearia pannosa subsp. cardiophylla (F.Muell.) D.A.Cooke. That name, and that of the autonym (Olearia pannosa Hook. subsp. pannosa (F.Muell.) D.A.Cooke) are accepted by the Australian Plant Census.

== Distribution and habitat ==
Both subspecies of O. pannosa occur in the south-east of South Australia, but only subspecies cardiophylla occurs in Victoria, where it grows in dry forest on rocky sites in scattered locations.

== Conservation status ==
Olearia pannosa subsp. pannosa is listed as "vulnerable" under the Australian Government Environment Protection and Biodiversity Conservation Act 1999 and the South Australian Government National Parks and Wildlife Act 1972. Threats to this subspecies include habitat loss, weed invasion and inappropriate fire regimes. Subspecies cardiophylla is listed as "vulnerable" in Victoria, under the Flora and Fauna Guarantee Act 1988.
