= Danger (unreleased Hindi film) =

- Directed by: Faisal Saif
- Written by: Faisal Saif
- Produced by: Faisal Saif; Ali G
- Starring: Faisal Khan; Vedita Pratap Singh; Kavita Radheshyam
- Cinematography: MRM Jai Suresh
- Edited by: Ashutosh Anand Verma
- Production company: Faith Pictures Inc.
- Country: India
- Language: Hindi

Danger is an unreleased Indian Bollywood horror thriller film, written and directed by Faisal Saif under his own banner Faith Pictures Inc.

== Plot ==
The film is inspired by true events of Gaya (Bihar) Hotel's brutal owner who killed people and used their meat to serve others. Khan plays a Gujrati stockbroker in the film who gets trapped in this hotel along with his wife played by Vedita Pratap Singh.

== Cast ==
- Faisal Khan
- Vedita Pratap Singh
- Kavita Radheshyam
- Sony Charishta
- Nishant Pandey
- Asif Basra
- Meera

== Production ==
=== Development ===
The official announcement of the film was announced in the end of July 2016. The title of the film was said to be Danger.

=== Casting ===
Saif approached actor Aamir Khan's brother Faisal Khan to play the main lead role and Khan found the script very exciting and became a part of it. Khan also claimed that he worked very hard on nailing the Gujrati accent required for the film. Later, Vedita Pratap Singh and Saif's regular fixture Kavita Radheshyam were added to the cast. Television actor Nishant Pandey was approached along with Sony Charishta to play other lead characters in the film.

=== Filming ===
The principal photography of the film commenced sometime in September 2016 and wrapped up with Pakistani actress Meera's song in December 2016.

=== Promotion ===
On 23 December 2016, the makers released the First Look poster of the film. India.com praised the First Look poster by calling it "Aamir Khan's brother Faissal Khan's comeback film looks creepy AF!".
