= Torquay Front Beach =

Beach in Torquay, Victoria, Australia

Torquay Front Beach Cosy Corner
- Beach
- Torquay Front Beach, looking towards Cosy Corner and Point Danger
- Interactive map of Torquay Front Beach
- Coordinates: 38°20′06″S 144°19′30″E
- Location: Torquay, Victoria, Australia
- Water bodies: Zeally Bay (Bass Strait)

Dimensions
  - Length: 1 kilometre (0.62 mi)
- Patrolled by: SLSA
- Hazard rating: 4/10 (moderately hazardous)
- Access: The Esplanade

Torquay Front Beach is a popular patrolled beach located in Torquay, Victoria, Australia. The beach faces due east and stretches for 1 kilometre from Yellow Bluff at its northern end to Point Danger to its south. The beach is popular with families, as the surf is comparably calmer than its counterpart, the adjacent surf beach, with an even calmer section of the beach protected by Point Danger known as Cosy Corner.

== Geography and features ==
Torquay Front Beach averages waves less than 1 metre, and is ideal for swimming as there are no rips and a shallow sandbar, with a seasonal lifeguard on duty. Many beginner surfers use the beach to practice, and occasionally, during big swell, larger waves make can make their way past Point Danger and toward the beach.

== History ==
Since the 1860s Torquay and its beaches have been frequented by holidaymakers, and, seeing the popularity of its beaches, the Torquay Improvement Association sought out the Royal Human Society to purchase a lifebuoy for the safety of those at the beach in 1899.

In the 1880s people began to erect bathing boxes, akin to those at Brighton, with many of them taking the name of the owner's houses.

On 7 May 1891, the Canadian vessel Joseph H. Scammell ran aground on the reef at Point Danger. Felix Rosser, a local fisherman, tried to sail out to the boat but was turned away by dangerous conditions, and lit fires along the foreshore and Fishermans Beach to guide the crew if rescuers could not get to the boat in time. The crew, all alive, managed to disembark the following day with calmer conditions.

In 1922, the Torquay Life Saving Club was formed, using a rudimentary bathing box and a bell tower. The surf lifesaving club was positioned here as opposed to the official surf beach around the Point as many swimmers rarely ventured into the water at the Back Beach, deeming it treacherous. The surf life saving club later moved to its present location on the surf beach in 1946.

In 1936, the Torquay Reserves Committee, fearing the loss of sand on the beach, constructed groynes and a sea wall on the beach to stop sand movement.

== See also ==
- Great Ocean Road
