= Joseph H. Scammell (ship) =

Canadian sailing ship

Coordinates: 38°20′31″S 144°19′54″E

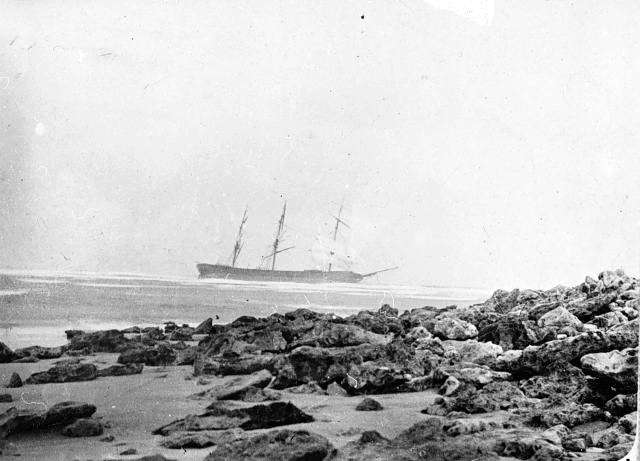
- Shipwrecked off Torquay in 1891

History

Canada
- Port of registry: Saint John, New Brunswick, Official Number 8675
- Builder: Scammell Brothers, Eatonville, Nova Scotia, Canada
- Launched: September 1884
- Identification: Code Letters RLJB
- Fate: Wreck at Torquay, Australia, May 7, 1891

General characteristics
- Type: Full-rigged ship
- Tonnage: 1459 gross tons
- Length: 223 feet (68 m)
- Beam: 39.2 feet (11.9 m)
- Depth: 22.5 feet (6.9 m)

The Joseph H Scammell was a Canadian sailing ship that was built at Eatonville, Nova Scotia in 1884 and shipwrecked at Point Danger, Torquay, Victoria, Australia in 1891. Her wreck triggered a large scale episode of shipwreck pilfering and smuggling.

== Construction ==
Joseph H Scammell was built at Eatonville a small village in Cumberland County, Nova Scotia. Today the village is a vanished ghost town in the middle of Cape Chignecto Provincial Park but, in 1884, it was the centre of a large lumbering operation and a substantial shipyard. In 1884, the yard was run by the Scammell Brothers who named the ship after one of the family patriarchs. The ship was launched in September 1884 and registered at Saint John, New Brunswick, the nearest large port. She would sail under a Canadian flag for her entire career.

== Wreck ==
On May 7, 1891, when the vessel was on its 114th day of its voyage from New York City to Melbourne, the Scammell had set a course for Port Phillip Heads when bad weather and rough seas dragged the ship towards the shore, and it ran aground on a reef near Point Danger at Torquay. There were 22 people aboard the Scammell, including the wife and daughter of Captain J A Chapman. The ship's dangerous position was first noticed by local fisherman at approximately 11 pm.

One of the fisherman, Felix Rosser, attempted to row out to the ship to provide assistance but was forced back to shore by strong seas. The following day, after the seas had settled, the crew of the ship were able to lower a boat and evacuate all on board. Due to the incident, Captain J. A. Chapman had his master’s certificate suspended for 12 months for careless navigation and negligence.

== Pilfering ==
In the following days, the cargo of the ship was washed ashore and an estimated 2,000 locals began looting various items of merchandise, which included tobacco, buggy sides, leather, clothing and kerosene. By the time customs officials and police arrived, most of the $120,000 cargo had already been looted. Within a week, a man from Geelong had purchased the ship and its remaining cargo for $2628, after an auction held on the beach. The ship's deckhouse was bought and incorporated into the second floor of a house at 24 Pride street, Torquay.

== Culture ==
In late 2014, several locals put on a performance outlining the history of the Joseph H. Scammell, on the Torquay front beach.
