= Area D (video game) =

1997 video game

- Developer: Dosch Design
- Publisher: ARI Data CD GmbH
- Platform: Microsoft Windows
- Release: 1997
- Genres: First-person adventure, FMV
- Mode: Single-player

Area D (also known as Danger Island in a 2002 re-release) is a first-person adventure and puzzle FMV video game. It was developed by Dosch Design, published by ARI Data CD GmbH, and released in 1997 in Germany for Microsoft Windows. The following year, it was released in other European countries. It follows a skilled adventurer who is sent to find a team of scientists sent into the Amazon, eventually being forced to fight dinosaurs in order to rescue them. The game was critically panned for most aspects, including its acting and writing.

== Reception ==
PC Games rated the game 28/100, calling the graphics good but saying that the lack of animations made it look outdated. They also criticized the lack of puzzles.

PC Player rated the game 19/100, joking that the game itself "wiped out the dinosaurs" due to its "monotonous" dialogue and questioning whether the actors were "professionals" as the game's advertising claimed.
