= Danger Point =

Cliff face in Devon, England

- Cliff
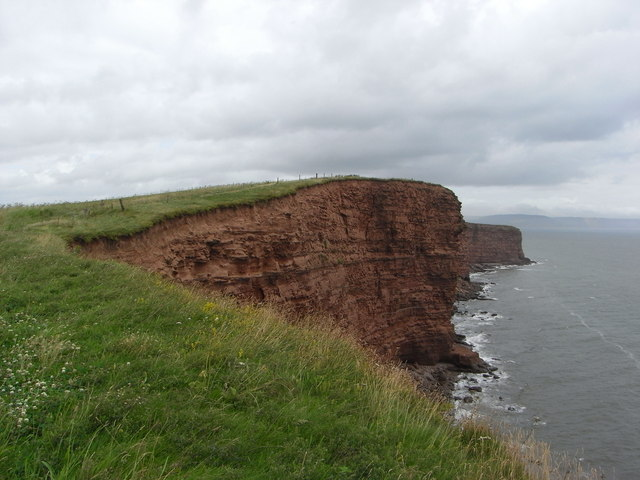

- Coordinates: 50.63165°N 3.30153°W

Danger Point is a coastal feature and cliff face in Devon, on the south coast of England. It is about 18 kilometres (11 mi) southeast of the city of Exeter and about 7 kilometres (4.3 mi) east of Exmouth and lies between the towns of Budleigh Salterton and Sidmouth.

== Geology and littoral ecology ==
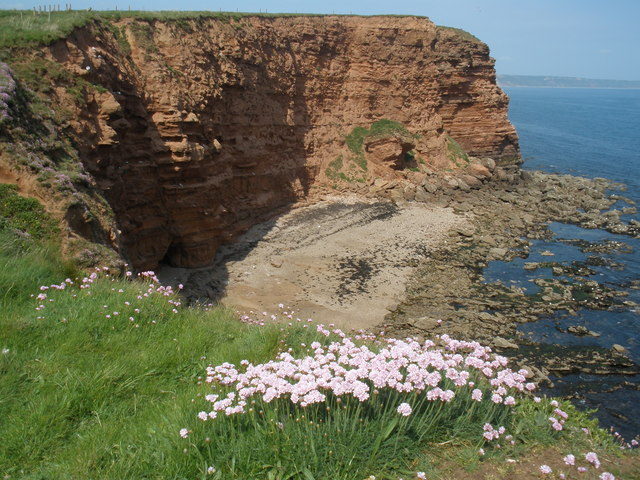
Danger Point, East Devon

There are two rock sequences along the coast at Budleigh Salterton, the Pebble Beds and the "Otter Sandstone Formation". In the cliff face it is very apparent that both dip eastward. The "Budleigh Salterton Pebble Beds" are overlain by the sandstones that form the cliffs at Danger Point. Both sediments are markedly red, which indicates that they were formed in a desert in the hot dry climate of in the Triassic Period about 225 million years ago.

The coastal path, south of the village of Otterton on the peninsula of Otter Sandstone, has many viewpoints and headlands from which the cliffs can be seen. However, there is no safe access to the seaward shore on any of the stretch between the southern tip near Danger Point to Ladram Bay in the north. The vertical cliffs are not interrupted (cut) by streams valleys, hence the lack of shore-access. To study the coast accurately a boat is required. It is possible to travel along the shore from the mouth of the Otter river to Ladram Bay near Otterton at very low tides but the beach is mostly covered with massive boulders of fallen sandstone, many very slippery because the more ferruginous nature of the rocks encourage algal growth. The embayments mean that there is always a risk of being cut off between headlands by even a slight rise in local sea level or weather conditions such as a wind blowing on shore. The most critical point is at Danger Point itself - hence its helpfully descriptive name! There are four other headlands which make this 4 km (3 mile) scramble continuously anxiety-provoking. However, the danger means the littoral ecology of the whole stretch is virtually untouched and very close to what can be inferred to be 'natural'. This includes impressively numerous gastropod populations with some unusually large specimens on show - (Patella spp & Littorina spp) and some red algae(such as Gigartina & Corallina ) which are fairly rare elsewhere on the south coast. There are some normal faults cutting the 100m cliffs further north closer to Ladram Bay and a lot of post-diagenetic mineralisation along joints, as well as some truncated coarse cross-bedding and what appear to be fossil levees seen in cross-section

Fossils from the Triassic period are extremely rare. Although normally only fossil fragments are found, the sandstones at Danger Point have yielded excellent discoveries, such as the Beaked Lizard, known as Rhynchosaur.
