= Jan Juc Beach =

Beach in Jan Juc, Victoria, Australia

- Beach
- Jan Juc Beach
- Interactive map of Jan Juc Beach
- Coordinates: 38°20′49″S 144°18′32″E
- Location: Jan Juc, Victoria, Australia
- Water bodies: Half Moon Bay (Bass Strait)

Dimensions
  - Length: 1.2 kilometres (0.75 mi)
- Patrolled by: SLSA
- Hazard rating: 7/10 (highly hazardous)
- Access: Carnarvon Avenue, Clubhouse Road, Ocean Boulevard

Jan Juc Beach is a patrolled beach in Jan Juc, Victoria, Australia, adjacent to the popular Torquay Surf Beach. The beach is situated along the Surf Coast coastline and faces south-south-west towards Bass Strait, and is a popular stopping-point for tourists exploring the Great Ocean Road. The beach is patrolled seasonally by the Jan Juc Surf Life Saving Club, and is known for its exposure to ocean swells and variable surf conditions.

== Geography ==
The beach is bounded by Rocky Point at the eastern end, and Bird Rock at the western end. The beach is surrounded by cliffs, that progressively get larger toward Bird Rock, with an exception being a small opening in the center of the beach, where the Jan Juc Creek intermittently flows out toward the ocean.

Due to the beach facing nearer to due south than the Torquay Surf Beach, Jan Juc receives larger waves, and combined with the medium to fine sand, produces a single bar with three to four rips. Permanent rips exist beside both Bird Rock and Rocky Point. Around 30 people are rescued each year.

== Geology ==
Jan Juc is situated within the Torquay Basin, which is characterised by rocks from the Cenozoic Age. The rocks progressively get older from east to west. From the eastern end, the cliffs are composed of Zeally limestone, which have unearthed fossils such as bryozoans, echinoids and other shelled creatures. Underneath the Surf Life Saving Club cliff, a unit of rock known as Gellibrand Marl appears, an even muddier form of limestone.

The Bird Rock headland, at the western end of the beach, is predominantly composed of Gellibrand Marl, which has been split into informal units known as Puebla Clay and Cellepora Beds, which is sandwiched by Zeally Limestone on top and Jan Juc Marl peeking out at the base of the headland. Bird Rock itself is composed of Jan Juc Marl, which originates from the Late Oligocene age. Its flat top is due to a hard limestone cap on top of grey marl. The arc-like shape of the rock indicates that it was part of a plunging anticline.

== History ==
During the 1960s, as surfing began to take off in popularity, many sought to escape the crowds, and so people would walk around Rocky Point to swim at Jan Juc Beach. It previously used to be known as Fossil Beach. As the beach can be treacherous at times, many swimmers found themselves in need of rescuing. Locals would run to the house of Joe Sweeney, who lived atop the cliffs and was a member of the nearby Torquay Surf Life Saving Club, who had a malibu set aside for performing a rescue. As more and more people arrived, his rescuing would become more frequent. He asked the locals for some financial support for a rescue reel and line to be placed on the beach, but no interest was shown, until in January 1963, a drowning occurred on a crowded day. Tom Trevaskis and Dick Garrard, two experienced local surfers, attempted to keep the patient afloat, but Joe did not make it in time after being summoned over. On 1 May 1964, the Jan Juc Surf Life Saving Club organised its first patrol roster.

In the late 1990s, Staumn Hunder, a teenage surfer who, whilst exploring the cliffs, discovered fossils, which were later identified as a new species, named Janjucetus in honour of the town.

In June 2019, local resident Ross Dullard discovered a fossil, composed of a skull with ears, bones and teeth. After handing in the fossils to Museums Victoria, it was later found that they were the same species.

== See also ==
- Bancoora Beach
- Thirteenth Beach
- Torquay Surf Beach
- Torquay Front Beach
- Twelve Apostles (Victoria)
- Great Ocean Road
