= Torquay Surf Beach =

Beach in Torquay, Victoria, Australia

Torquay Surf Beach Torquay Back Beach
- Beach
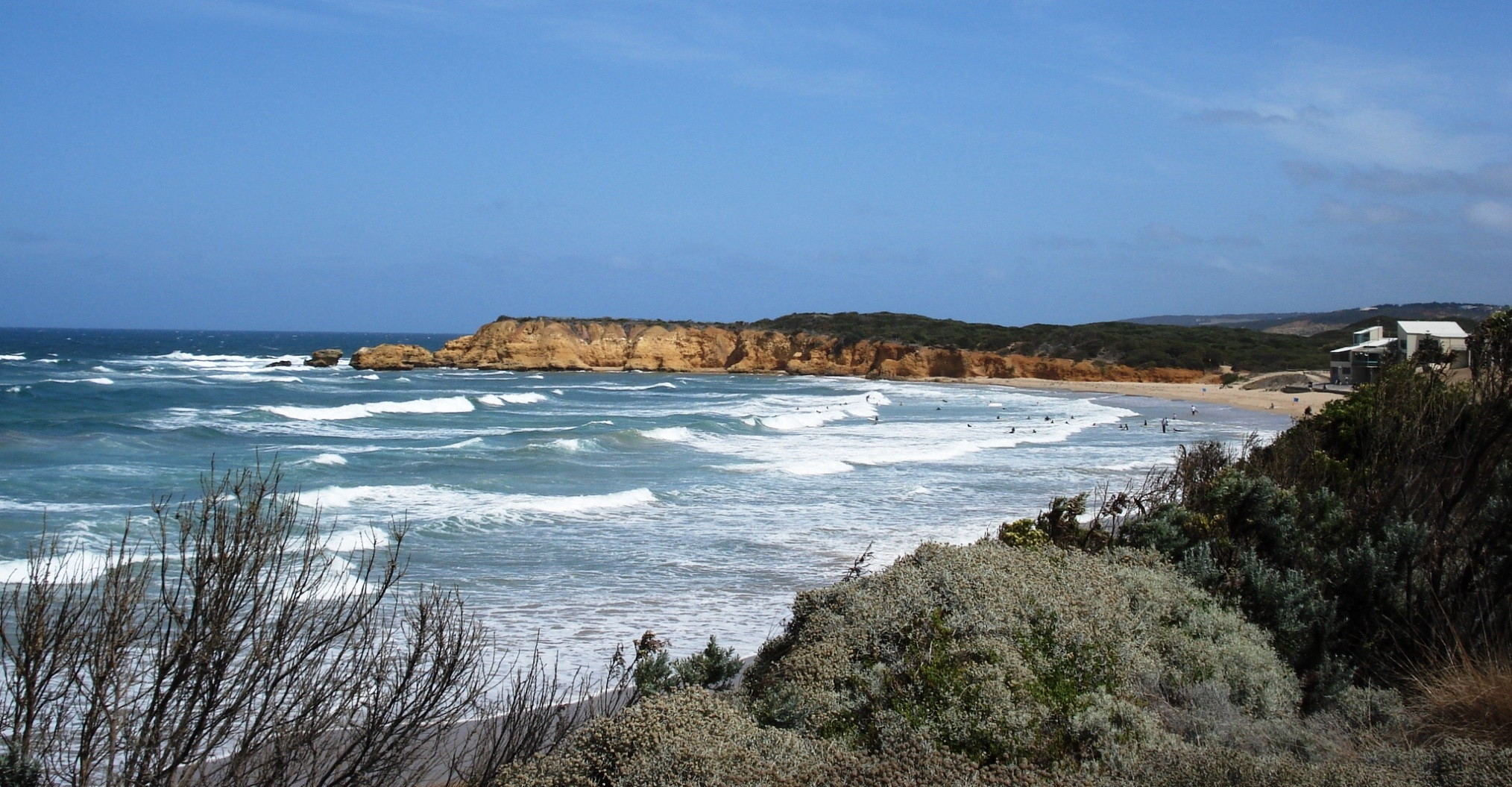
- Torquay Back Beach
- Interactive map of Torquay Surf Beach
- Coordinates: 38°20′34″S 144°19′13″E
- Location: Torquay, Victoria, Australia
- Water bodies: Bass Strait

Dimensions
  - Length: 0.8 kilometres (0.50 mi)
- Patrolled by: SLSA
- Hazard rating: 6/10 (moderately hazardous)
- Access: Surf Beach Drive, The Esplanade

Torquay Surf Beach, also known as the Torquay Back Beach (to distinguish it from the nearby Torquay Front Beach), is a highly popular patrolled coastal beach facing the Bass Strait in Torquay, Victoria, Australia. It lies southwest of Torquay's town centre and adjacent to the start of the Great Ocean Road, attracting surfers, beachgoers and tourists. The beach reserve is managed by the Surf Coast Shire council in partnership with the Great Ocean Road Coast and Parks Authority, and seasonal patrolling is provided by the Torquay Surf Life Saving Club (part of Life Saving Victoria).

== Geography and features ==
Torquay Back Beach faces the open ocean of the Bass Strait and is bounded to the northeast by Point Danger, a limestone headland that separates the beach from Torquay's Front Beach, which is comparatively more sheltered and sees smaller waves, ideal for swimmers. Whilst typically safer in the patrolled areas, the rocky areas at either ends of the beach can be particularly dangerous, and roughly 27 people are rescued each year.

The beach faces south-east, and a small amount of protection and calmer water can be found in the southern area beside Rocky Point. Waves are around 1.2 metres (~3 ft) on average, and typically create three rips. A permanent rip, known as the 'Escalator', takes surfers out to surf-breaks known as "Torquay Point" and "Haystacks", located beside Rocky Point, with the latter taking its name from the Hay Stacks, two small limestone rocks jutting out from the Point. Towards Point Danger, another rip marks a surf break known as "Draino's", and transports surfers to "Supertubers", a surf break positioned off the intertidal reef of Point Danger.

To the west of the life saving club, Spring Creek drains out toward the ocean, typically sealed by sand. Fishing is popular here, as well as in the rocky areas toward Point Danger.

== History ==
Holidaymakers have frequented Torquay's beaches since the 1860s and with the creation of the town, this number continued to increase. The Front Beach was favoured more for early swimmers and the surf lifesaving equipment was initially installed there as early as 1899.

During World War II, fearing a Japanese invasion, much of the foreshore was closed off, and barbed wire was placed across the dunes surrounding the beach, and anti-tank pylons placed in the sand. By 1943, these defences were being pulled down by Italian prisoners of war.

In December 1945, the formation of the Torquay Surf Life Saving Club was discussed, and the inaugural club meeting took place in the Palace Hotel on 4 January 1946.

A central figure in Torquay's early surfing history was Rex Albert "China" Gilbert (born 23 April 1924). China and his friends were among the first to ride the waves around Torquay in the 1940s, travelling from Melbourne in search of surf and embracing the emerging culture of board riding on wooden surfboards.

In November 1956, as part of the Melbourne Olympics, the Australian and International Surf Carnival was held at the beach, seeing participants from California, Hawaii, Ceylon, South Africa, and New Zealand, amongst locals.

The beach and town were the setting of "Narmucca Bay", a fictional town featured in the Australian comedy mockumentary Angry Boys.

== See also ==
- Jan Juc Beach
- Twelve Apostles (Victoria)
- Great Ocean Road
