= Point Danger (Torquay) =

Coordinates: 38°20′24″S 144°19′38″E

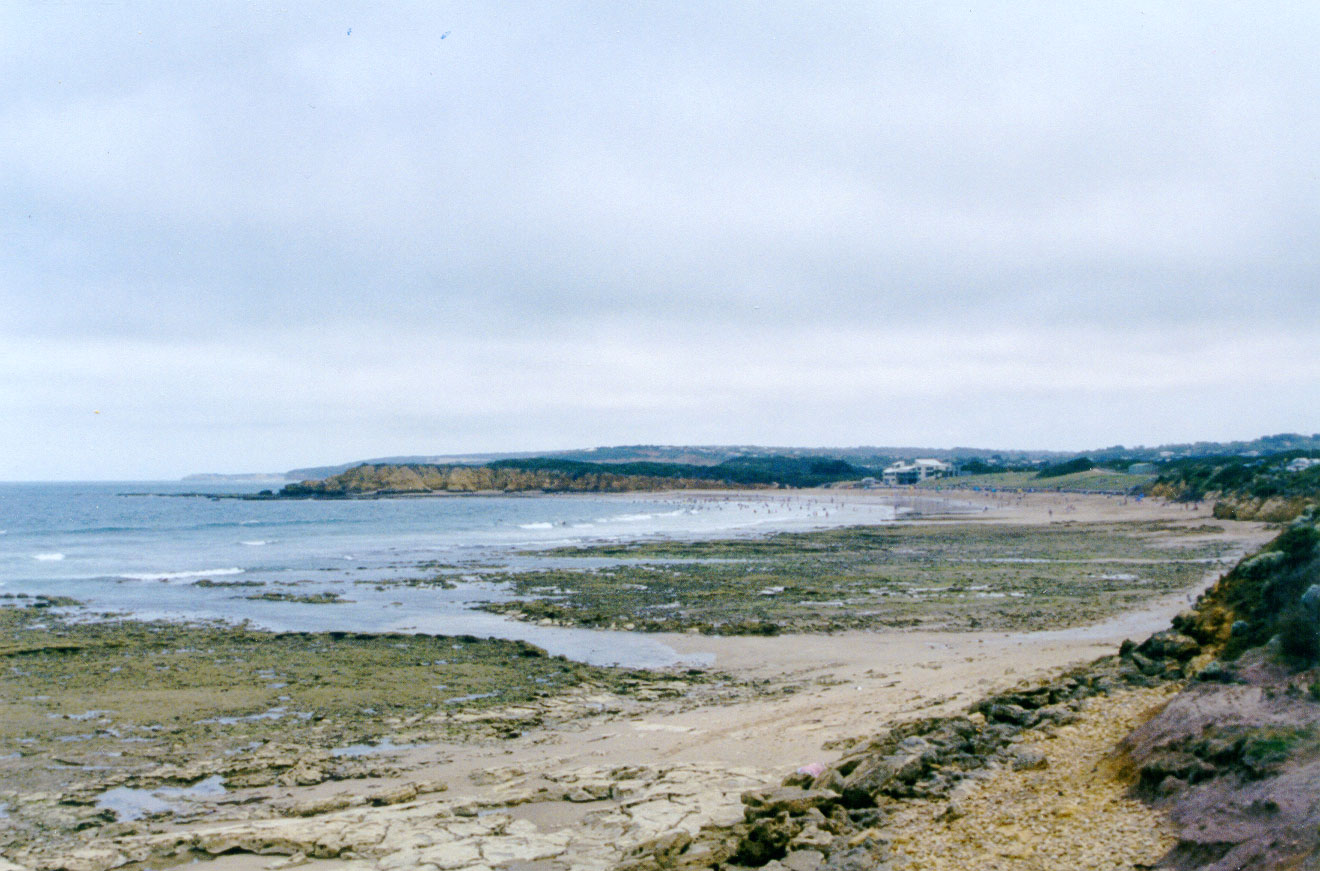
Westward view of Torquay and the coast from Point Danger

Point Danger is a limestone headland on the coast of south-western Victoria, Australia on the northern side of Bass Strait. It is adjacent to the coastal town of Torquay, separating the town's front and back surfing beaches. It is the site of Torquay's war memorial and a venue for ANZAC Day services.

== Marine sanctuary ==
The waters off the headland are protected in the 25 ha (62-acre) Point Danger Marine Sanctuary, which includes a large, sandy, limestone reef platform. It contains a diverse variety of marine invertebrates, with 96 species of opisthobranchs recorded in the area.
