= Johanna Beach =

Beach in Victoria, Australia

Johanna Beach Sutherlands Beach
- Beach
- Johanna Beach
- Interactive map of Johanna Beach
- Coordinates: 38°45′43″S 143°22′36″E
- Location: Johanna, Victoria, Australia
- Water bodies: Southern Ocean

Dimensions
  - Length: 3.6 kilometres (2.2 mi)
- Hazard rating: 8/10 (highly hazardous)
- Access: Red Johanna Road

Johanna Beach is an exposed ocean beach near Johanna, on the Great Ocean Road coast of south-western Victoria, Australia. The beach extends for approximately 3.6 kilometres (2.2 mi) between Slippery Point in the west and Rotten Point in the east, with the Johanna River crossing its central section before entering the Southern Ocean. Johanna Beach is a well-known surfing location and hosted the World Surfing Championships in 1970. It has also been used as an alternative competition venue for the Rip Curl Pro when conditions at Bells Beach were unsuitable.

== History ==
Johanna Beach takes its name from the brig Johanna, which was wrecked near the mouth of the Johanna River on 22 September 1843 while travelling westward through Bass Strait. The vessel was carrying supplies from Launceston toward Port Fairy and Portland when it was driven ashore during a gale. One crew member was swept away and drowned during the wreck, while four others reached the shore.

With no nearby European settlement, the survivors travelled east along the coast and reached Geelong eight days later. After exhausting their supplies they reportedly survived partly on shellfish and blubber from a whale carcass found on the shore and received assistance from Aboriginal people encountered during the journey. Their journey has been described as the first recorded European traverse of this section of the Victorian coast.

European settlement of the Johanna district expanded following the opening of land for selection during the late nineteenth century, and in December 1888, settler Alfred Hampshire chartered the ketch Emily to transport his family and belongings to the area. After the passengers had been brought ashore, deteriorating weather prevented the vessel from leaving and it was subsequently driven on to the beach. Much of its cargo was recovered, but the vessel was not refloated.

A school operated on the cliffs overlooking Johanna Beach between 1911 and 1916. The beach later became a competitive surfing venue, with it hosting the World Surfing Championships in 1970 and was used for rounds of the Rip Curl Pro in 2007 and 2010 when surf conditions at Bells Beach were inadequate for competition.

== Geology ==
Much of the bedrock exposed around Johanna Beach consists of Eumerella Sandstone. At the eastern end of the beach, inclined sedimentary layers can be seen in small coastal headlands where the strata dip beneath the surface. The same sandstone reappears at the western end of the beach and continues westward as a series of coastal cliffs toward Moonlight Head.

Large reddish boulders containing conglomeratic layers also occur on the beach. These are derived from younger rock formations inland and were transported toward the coast before reaching the shoreline. The material formed considerably later than the underlying Eumeralla Sandstone, during a geological period associated with the early inundation of the area now occupied by Bass Strait. Exposures of these younger strata can occasionally be seen behind the beach where the dune cover is interrupted.

A small outcrop contains fossil-bearing strata with marine fossils including sea urchins, bryozoans and brachiopods. Near the western camping and parking area, a shoreline reef of calcarenite is exposed at low tide. The calcarenite formed from wind-blown sand during the Pleistocene and contains a series of circular pools weathered into the surface.

== Geography and features ==
Johanna Beach faces south-west and is exposed directly to Southern Ocean swell, with average wave heights exceeding 1.5 metres (4 ft 11 in). The eastern half of the beach is backed by dunes rising against coastal bluffs approximately 30 to 100 metres (98 to 328 ft) high. Grassy slopes occur behind the western end, where a camping and picnic area is situated. Rotten Point forms the eastern boundary of the beach and Slippery Point its western boundary.

The Johanna River crosses the central part of the beach, although the size and position of its mouth vary according to rainfall, river flow and beach conditions. At times the river reaches the sea as a relatively small stream, while during periods of greater discharge it can form a substantially larger channel across the beach.

The surf zone is characterised by a series of transverse sand bars separated by deep rip channels. There are approximately eight bar-and-rip systems along the shoreline, with the rip channels spaced at intervals of roughly 350 metres (1,150 ft). The surf zone extends to around 250 metres (820 ft) in width in places. These features develop through the interaction of persistent wave energy with the beach's medium-grained sand and produce breaking waves on either side of the bars.

The depth of the rip channels allows waves to travel farther toward shore before breaking than on beaches with more uniform sand bars, contributing to the formation of both left- and right-breaking waves. Johanna Beach can therefore remain surfable during relatively large swells and has long been used when conditions at more sheltered surfing locations farther east are too small. Surfing conditions are generally favoured by northerly to north-easterly winds and low to moderate swell, although substantially larger waves also occur.

The same rip systems make the beach hazardous for swimming. Deep channels occur close to shore and strong seaward currents can develop throughout the surf zone, particularly within the embayments between sand bars. The beach is also used for recreational fishing, with the deeper rip channels providing fishing holes from the shore. Species recorded as targets of surf fishing include salmon, mullet and gummy shark.

== Access ==
Johanna Beach is accessible by a loop road from the Great Ocean Road. A camping and picnic area is situated behind the western section of the beach, with parking and viewing areas overlooking the coast. The Great Ocean Walk also crosses the area and descends to the beach by a steep track near its eastern end.

== See also ==
- Glenaire Beach
- Castle Cove
- Wreck Beach
- Princetown Beach
- Port Campbell Beach
- Jan Juc Beach
- Great Ocean Road
