= Martyrs Beach =

Beach in Victoria, Australia

Martyrs Beach Bay of Martyrs Beach
- Beach
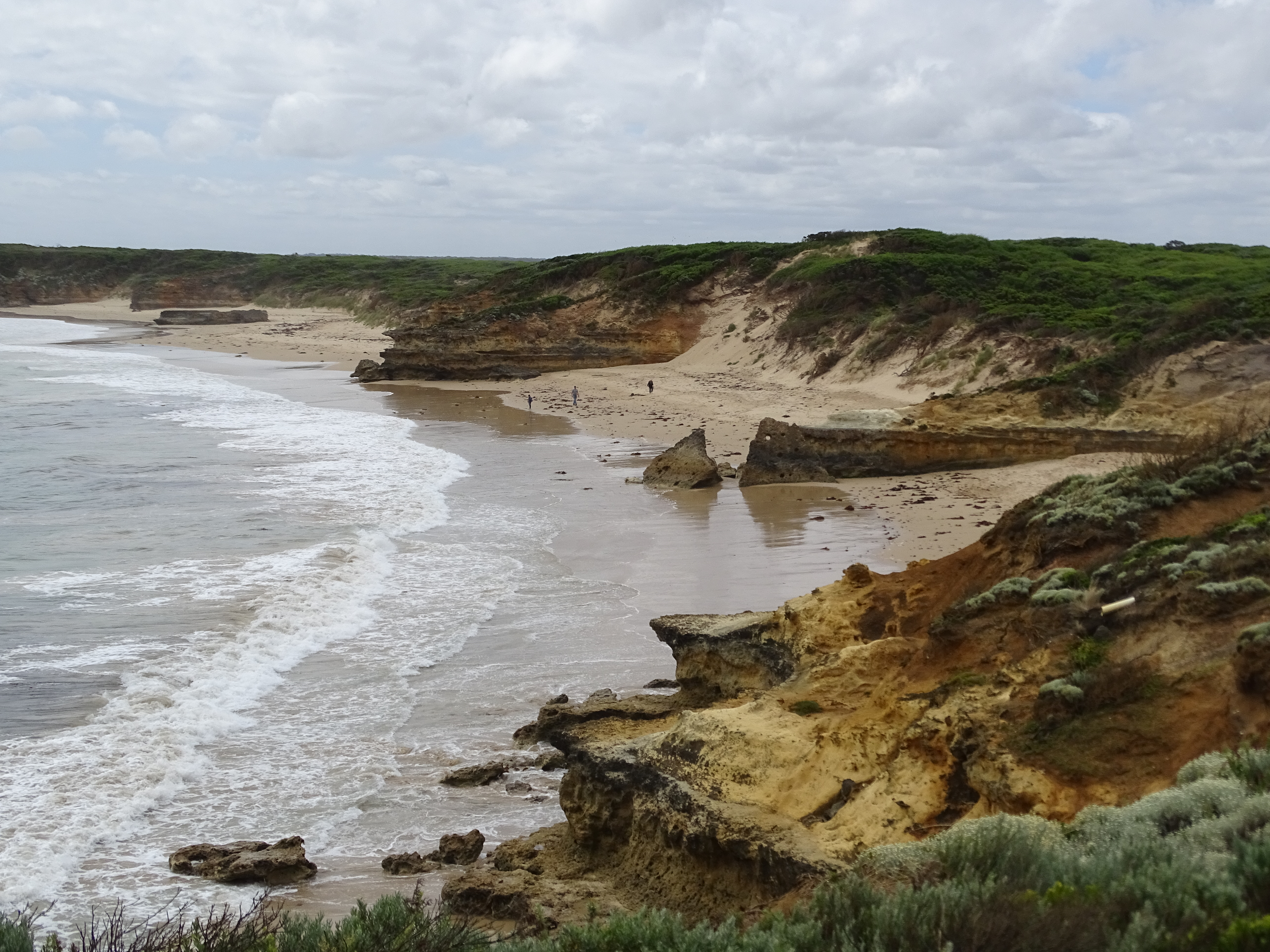
- Martyrs Beach
- Interactive map of Martyrs Beach
- Coordinates: 38°35′51″S 142°51′29″E
- Location: Peterborough, Victoria, Australia
- Water bodies: Bay of Martyrs (Southern Ocean)

Dimensions
  - Length: 0.5 kilometres (0.31 mi)
- Hazard rating: 4/10 (moderately hazardous)
- Access: Great Ocean Road

Martyrs Beach, also known as Bay of Martyrs Beach, is a coastal beach at the eastern end of the Bay of Martyrs near Peterborough, on the Great Ocean Road in south-western Victoria, Australia. The beach is approximately 500 metres (1,600 ft) long and forms part of the Bay of Islands Coastal Park. It is partly sheltered by the reefs and offshore rock formations within the bay and is one of several beaches along the Bay of Martyrs shoreline.

== Geography and features ==
The Bay of Martyrs is an open, south-west facing embayment approximately 2.5 kilometres (1.6 mi) long. Its coastline is characterised by numerous offshore reefs and limestone sea stacks, while much of the shoreline is formed by reddish limestone bluffs rising to around 10 metres (33 ft). Several smaller coves and beaches occur within the bay, including Massacre Bay and Crofts Bay. Martyrs Beach occupies the eastern end of the larger bay.

Martyrs Beach faces south-west and is backed by a combination of low dunes and irregular limestone bluffs. The Great Ocean Road passes close behind the shoreline, with a car park and beach access situated at the eastern end. Offshore reefs reduce wave energy reaching the beach, and surf conditions are generally less energetic than on more exposed sections of the surrounding coast.

The reefs become more exposed as the tide falls, while higher tides cover more of the shallow reef platform. Martyrs Beach is one of the more accessible and comparatively sheltered swimming locations within the bay, although conditions remain dependent on tide and swell. Surfing generally occurs on offshore reef breaks rather than directly from the beach. The shallow reefs are also used for recreational fishing, particularly around higher tide.

The beach provides habitat for the hooded plover, which nests along this section of coast. Visitors are advised to keep clear of the birds and nesting areas. Dogs are not permitted on Martyrs Beach because of the presence of breeding hooded plovers, although they are permitted on some adjoining walking tracks and beaches elsewhere between the Bay of Martyrs car park and Peterborough.

== See also ==
- Peterborough Beach
- Torquay Surf Beach
- Port Campbell Beach
- Wild Dog Cove
- Great Ocean Road
