= Milanesia Beach =

Beach in Victoria, Australia

- Beach
- Milanesia Beach
- Interactive map of Milanesia Beach
- Coordinates: 38°45′06″S 143°18′46″E
- Location: Yuulong, Victoria, Australia
- Water bodies: Southern Ocean

Dimensions
  - Length: 1.8 kilometres (1.1 mi)
- Hazard rating: 7/10 (highly hazardous)
- Access: Hornes Road

Milanesia Beach is a remote ocean beach on the Great Ocean Road coast of south-western Victoria, Australia. The beach occupies an open bay between Lion Headland and Bowker Point and extends for approximately 1.8 kilometres (1.1 mi). It is backed by steep forested slopes and private farmland, while offshore reefs partly shelter the shoreline from direct Southern Ocean swell. Access is limited, with no formal facilities at the beach.

== Geography, geology and features ==
Milanesia Beach lies within a bay approximately 2 kilometres (1.2 mi) wide, bounded by Lion Headland, which rises to about 100 metres (330 ft), and Bowker Point. The beach faces south-south-west and is backed by steep, forested slopes reaching elevations of around 200 metres (660 ft). Two valleys cut through the slopes behind the beach, including Nettle Pass, which carries drainage from Milanesia Creek and Running Creek toward the coast.

Milanesia Creek periodically forms a small lagoon behind the beach. Near the creek mouth, deeper water provides one of the few sections of the nearshore zone largely free of rocks and reef. Elsewhere, patchy reefs occur along much of the 1.8 kilometres (1.1 mi) shoreline. Although these reefs reduce some incoming wave energy, gaps within them produce six persistent rip currents.

Rocky reefs and rip channels dominate much of the surf zone. Quieter pools can form among the reefs, particularly around low tide, but the beach remains isolated and exposed to strong currents. Surfing occurs over the offshore reefs, generally during smaller swells and around higher tide, while fishing takes places from the beach, rip holes and exposed rocks.

The cliffs and rock platforms toward Lion Headland contain sedimentary rocks deposited on an ancient floodplain about 106 million years ago. Some exposed and fallen slabs preserve ripple marks and other sedimentary structures, while the cliff faces also contain conspicuous concretions. Rockfalls occur along this section of coast.

In 2010, palaeontologists identified approximately 20 dinosaur footprints on two fallen rock slabs at Milanesia Beach. The tracks represented at least three small dinosaurs. The slabs were subsequently removed form the beach and transported to Melbourne for museum preservation and study.

== Access ==
The beach is partly bordered by privately land. Access is provided by a vehicle track and a separate walking track, with the latter reached from the end of Hornes Road. Parking near the access points is limited.

== See also ==
- Glenaire Beach
- Castle Cove
- Wreck Beach
- Princetown Beach
- Port Campbell Beach
- Jan Juc Beach
- Great Ocean Road
