= Sherbrook River Beach =

Beach in Victoria, Australia

Sherbrook River Beach Broken Head Beach Rutledge Creek Beach
- Beach
- Interactive map of Sherbrook River Beach
- Coordinates: 38°38′34″S 143°03′25″E
- Location: Port Campbell, Victoria, Australia
- Water bodies: Southern Ocean

Dimensions
  - Length: 0.2 kilometres (0.12 mi)
- Hazard rating: 7/10 (highly hazardous)
- Access: Great Ocean Road

Sherbrook River Beach is an exposed ocean beach at the mouth of the Sherbrook River on the Great Ocean Road coast of south-western Victoria, Australia. The beach lies west of Loch Ard Gorge and is backed by low coastal cliffs and a small area of dunes. The river mouth is commonly closed by a sand barrier, forming a shallow estuarine area behind the beach, while the ocean shoreline is exposed to strong surf and rip currents.

== Geography and features ==
The Sherbrook River enters the coast west of Loch Ard Gorge after a short catchment of a little over 12 kilometres (7.5 mi). Its relatively small flow means that the river does not always maintain an open connection with the Southern Ocean. A sand barrier frequently develops across the mouth, creating an estuarine pool immediately inland from the beach. At other times, the river cuts through the barrier and flows directly to the sea.

The beach faces south-west and is backed by cliffs approximately 10 to 20 metres (33 to 66 ft) high, with a small dune area near the river mouth. It is composed mainly of medium-grained sand and has a relatively steep profile. Offshore, a single sand bar commonly develops, often separated from the shore, with a persistent rip channel extending seaward through the surf zone.

The ocean beach is exposed to larger waves than nearby Broken Head Beach and is hazardous for swimming because of rip currents, deep water and an energetic shorebreak. When the river entrance is closed, the sheltered water behind the sand barrier can provide calmer conditions, although the width, depth and flow of the river mouth can change rapidly. Visitors are advised not to cross the mouth because currents may be affected by river discharge, tides and incoming waves.

Surfing occurs over the offshore bars and nearby reefs under suitable conditions. The permanent rip channel and deeper water close to shore also create areas used for recreational fishing.

Sherbrook River Beach lies near several other coastal features, including Broken Head, Thunder Cave and Loch Ard Gorge. Access is from a turn-off on the Great Ocean Road west of the Sherbrook River bridge, followed by a gravel road to a parking area and a walking track to the coast. The river mouth is roughly a 1 kilometre (0.62 mi) walk from the car park.

== See also ==
- Peterborough Beach
- Torquay Surf Beach
- Port Campbell Beach
- Wild Dog Cove
- Great Ocean Road
