= Worm Bay =

Beach in Peterborough, Victoria, Australia

- Beach
- Worm Bay
- Interactive map of Worm Bay
- Coordinates: 38°36′04″S 142°51′29″E
- Location: Peterborough, Victoria, Australia
- Water bodies: Worm Bay (Southern Ocean)

Dimensions
  - Length: 0.1 kilometres (0.062 mi)
- Hazard rating: 4/10 (moderately hazardous)
- Access: Great Ocean Road

Worm Bay is a small beach on the eastern side of the Bay of Martyrs, near Peterborough, on the Great Ocean Road in south-western Victoria, Australia. The beach is approximately 100 metres (330 ft) long and lies within a narrow break in the surrounding limestone bluffs. Its position inside the Bay of Martyrs and the presence of offshore reefs provide some protection from open-ocean swell.

== Geography and features ==
Worm Bay lies about 300 metres (980 ft) west of the Falls of Halladale car park and is situated immediately west of the Great Ocean Road. The beach is backed by limestone bluffs approximately 10 metres (33 ft) high, with stairs access descending from the cliffs to the sand. Parking areas are located near both ends of the beach.

The beach faces west and is partly enclosed by headlands on either side. Numerous reefs within the Bay of Martyrs further reduce incoming wave energy, and conditions on the beach are usually characterised by relatively low waves that surge onto the beach face rather than forming a broad surf zone. Larger swells can produce a stronger shorebreak.

The surrounding cliffs form a curved enclosure around much of the beach and provide some shelter from prevailing winds, although southerly conditions remain more exposed. At the western end, sections of the cliff overhang the beach and create a sheltered recess. Native coastal vegetation occurs along the bluff and around the access steps. Offshore, several of the limestone sea stacks of the Bay of Martyrs are visible from the beach.

The shallow inshore area is used for wading and swimming in calmer conditions, while deeper water occurs relatively close to parts of the shoreline. There is no recognised surf break within Worm Bay itself, although surfing occurs on reefs farther offshore in the Bay of Martyrs. Fishing takes place from the beach, adjoining headlands and bluffs, where access to deeper water is available.

== See also ==
- Martyrs Beach
- Wild Dog Cove
- Thirteenth Beach
- Torquay Surf Beach
- Torquay Front Beach
- Jan Juc Beach
- Great Ocean Road
