= Crofts Beach =

Beach in Peterborough, Victoria, Australia

- Beach
- Interactive map of Crofts Beach
- Coordinates: 38°35′14″S 142°50′11″E
- Location: Peterborough, Victoria, Australia
- Water bodies: Crofts Bay (Southern Ocean)

Dimensions
  - Length: 1.2 kilometres (0.75 mi)
- Hazard rating: 4/10 (moderately hazardous)
- Access: Great Ocean Road

Crofts Beach, also known as Crofts Bay, is a coastal beach west of Peterborough, on the Great Ocean Road in south-western Victoria, Australia. It occupies the westernmost of the smaller embayments within the broader Bay of Martyrs and extends for approximately 1.2 kilometres (0.75 mi). The beach is partly sheltered by an extensive offshore reef system, resulting in generally lower wave energy than on more exposed sections of the surrounding coast.

== Geography and features ==
The name of the beach most likely comes from Henry Croft, who purchased the property behind the bay in 1877.

Crofts Bay lies approximately 4 kilometres (2.5 mi) west of Peterborough and forms a shallow, south-facing embayment backed by low dunes and coastal bluffs. The Great Ocean Road passes behind the beach, with parking areas near the centre and western end of the bay. Steps descend from the western car park to the shoreline, while another access track approaches from near the Bay of Islands area.

Reefs extend for up to approximately 1 kilometre (0.62 mi) offshore and reduce the size of waves reaching the beach to an average of about 0.5 metres (1 ft 8 in). The shoreline is relatively steep and generally lacks a developed sand bar or persistent rip-current system. Small rocks occur along parts of the beach, while sections of reef become exposed as the tide falls.

The comparatively sheltered conditions make the beach less energetic than many nearby ocean beaches, although the water becomes deep relatively close to shore, particularly around high tide. Surfing is generally limited to the outer reef breaks rather than the beach itself. Recreational fishing takes place from the beach and reef margins, with species targeted in the bay including Australian salmon, trevally, snapper, sweep and gummy shark.

The western end of the bay contains caves and recesses in the coastal bluff that were formerly used to store small fishing boats above the waterline. Local families also maintained holiday shacks in this part of the bay, and the area was used seasonally for fishing and recreation. Some of the former boat-storage cavities remain visible in the rock face.

== See also ==
- Peterborough Beach
- Torquay Surf Beach
- Port Campbell Beach
- Wild Dog Cove
- Great Ocean Road
