= Castle Cove (Victoria) =

Beach in Victoria, Australia

- Beach
- Castle Cove
- Interactive map of Castle Cove
- Coordinates: 38°46′59″S 143°25′39″E
- Location: Glenaire, Victoria, Australia
- Water bodies: Southern Ocean

Dimensions
  - Length: 0.3 kilometres (0.19 mi)
- Hazard rating: 8/10 (highly hazardous)
- Access: Great Ocean Road

Castle Cove is a coastal beach on the Great Ocean Road in south-western Victoria, Australia. It contains a small main beach and a narrower adjoining beach, both exposed to the Southern Ocean. The Great Ocean Road reaches the coast at Castle Cove after running inland from the Mounts Bay area, with a roadside lookout situated on the cliffs above the beach. Castle Cove is also recognised for its geological exposures and is identified as a geological site of state significance.

== Geology ==
The cliffs at Castle Cove expose rocks belonging to the Eumeralla Formation, including grey sandstone and mudstone. At the western end of the beach, these sedimentary layers are initially close to horizontal before dipping steeply beneath beach level. The change in orientation has been attributed to the subsurface 'Castle Cove Fault'.

Farther east, the steeply dipping sequence includes younger marine sediments deposited over a period of roughly 30 million years beginning about 50 million years ago. These strata record a period when marine conditions extended across the region during the separation of Australia from Antarctica and the continuing breakup of Gondwana. Fossilised shells occur within some of the exposed layers.

== Geography and features ==
Castle Cove contains two south-west-facing beaches backed by steep, vegetated bluffs. The main beach is approximately 300 metres (980 ft) long, while the eastern beach is a narrower strip of sand bordered by patchy rock and reef. A roadside car park and viewing area are located on the cliffs about 30 metres (98 ft) above the shoreline.

Both beaches are exposed to waves averaging more than 1.5 metres (4 ft 11 in). The interaction between the incoming swell, sand and reef produces two persistent rip-current systems. The larger rip flows directly offshore below the main lookout, while another occurs farther east and extends beyond the eastern beach. The surf zone is also affected by reefs and, during larger swell, a heavy shorebreak.

The permanent rip channel influences the local surf breaks, with waves breaking to either side of the channel during lower to moderate swell. On larger swells, a right-breaking wave can form from the rocky western end of the cove. The beach is also used for recreational fishing, particularly around the deeper water associated with the main rip channel.

Swimming is hazardous because of the combination of strong rip currents, reefs, deep water and exposed surf. Most visitors view the cove from the cliff-top lookout rather than entering the beach. Direct descent from the roadside lookout is not encouraged, although access to the shoreline may be possible from tracks connected to the Great Ocean Walk.

== See also ==
- Thirteenth Beach
- Princetown Beach
- Milanesia Beach
- Wreck Beach
- Torquay Surf Beach
- Torquay Front Beach
- Jan Juc Beach
- Great Ocean Road
