= Ford River =

Ford River may refer to:

== Rivers ==
- Ford River (Victoria), Australia
- Ford River (Michigan), a tributary of Lake Michigan, U.S.
- Ford River (Nunavut), Southampton Island, a river in Nunavut, Canada
- Ford River (Tasmania), a river of Tasmania, Australia

== Places ==
- Ford River, Michigan, U.S., an unincorporated community
  - Ford River Township, Michigan

== See also ==
- Ford (crossing), a shallow crossing of a river or stream
- Sam Ford Fiord, Baffin Island, Canada
- Fording River, British Columbia, Canada
