= Great Ocean Walk =

Australian walking trail

Coordinates: 38°47′18″S 143°39′03.2″E

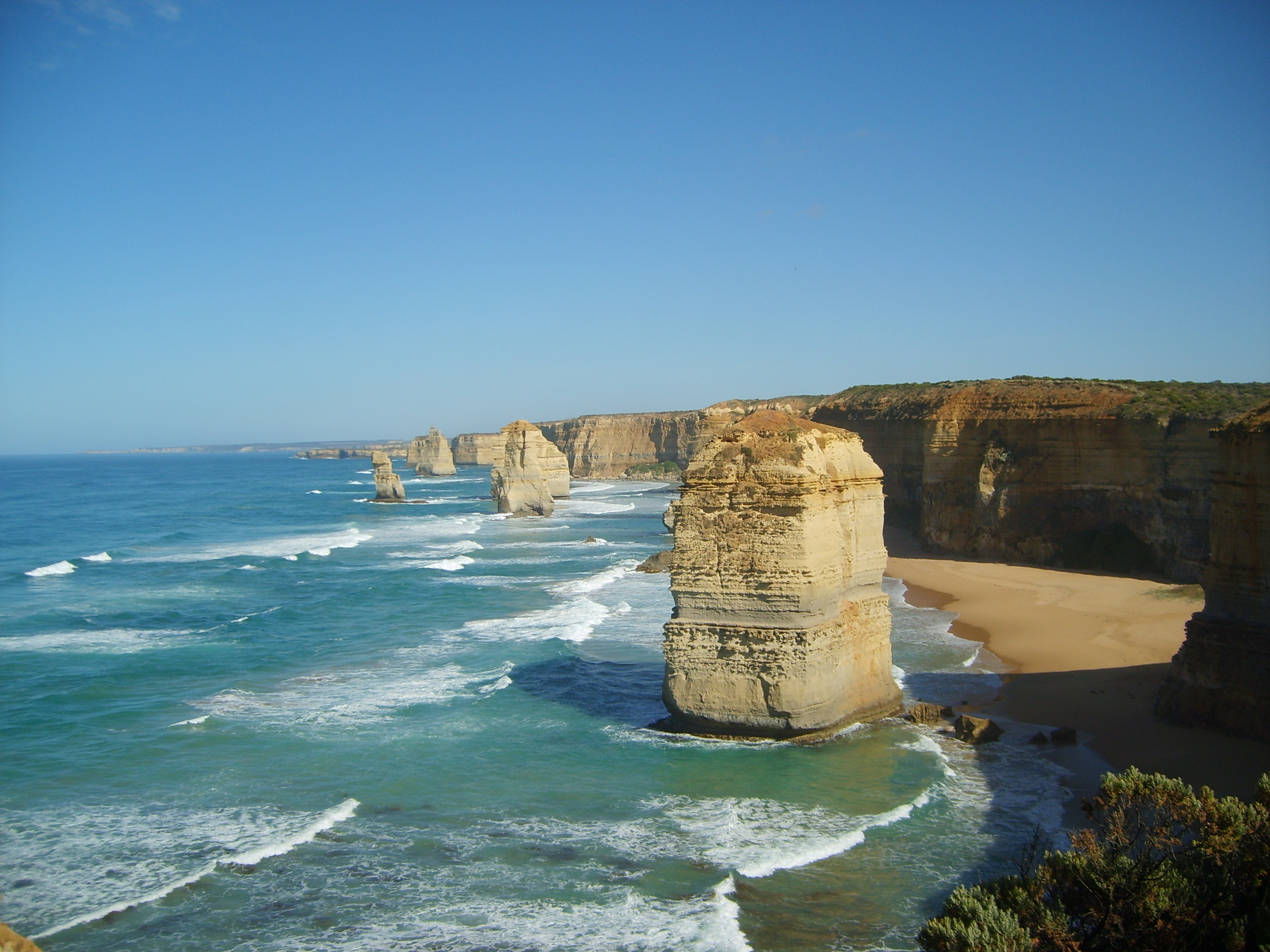
- The Twelve Apostles
- Length: 104 km (65 mi)
- Location: Victoria, Australia
- Trailheads: Apollo Bay, The Twelve Apostles (Victoria)
- Use: Hiking: overnight and day walks
- Lowest point: Beaches
- Difficulty: Easy-medium
- Season: All
- Sights: Coastal, shipwrecks, beaches, rivers, Waterfalls
- Hazards: Snake bite, cliff walking, high tides and river crossings
- Maintainer: Great Ocean Road Coast and Parks Authority

The Great Ocean Walk is a walking trail on Victoria's southwest coast in Australia, traversing several areas of historical and cultural significance. The track makes extensive usage of eco-friendly facilities; with Parks Victoria and tour guide operators attempting to raise environmental awareness. The trail meanders along high cliff tops and sandy beaches.

== Track ==
The Great Ocean Walk is a walking track located 200 kilometres south-west of Melbourne. It stretches 104 kilometres from Apollo Bay to Glenample Homestead, located near The Twelve Apostles, Victoria. The walk passes through the Otway National Park, with Parks Victoria providing seven hike-in camp-sites spaced at intervals of 10 km to 15 km along the track. Guided tours are offered by several operators, with the walk estimated to take about eight days to complete. All walkers are required to register with Parks Victoria, and must book for use of camp-sites.

The track hugs coastline which is not always visible from the Great Ocean Road; and traverses an area that hosts koalas, wallabies, echidnas, reptiles, bird species, snakes (including tiger, brown, and copperhead), ants, bees, European wasps and leeches. From June through September, whales can be spotted along the coastline. The track passes through several named areas; including Elliot Ridge, Blanket Bay, Cape Otway, Aire River and the Aire River Beach, Johanna Beach, Ryans Den and Devils Kitchen.

The difficulty of the track increases along the walk; with the section between Apollo Bay and Cape Otway suitable for beginners, becoming more challenging when reaching the rugged terrain through Ryans Den. Also, travellers need to note that sections of track can be dangerous or impassable at high tide.

== Facilities ==
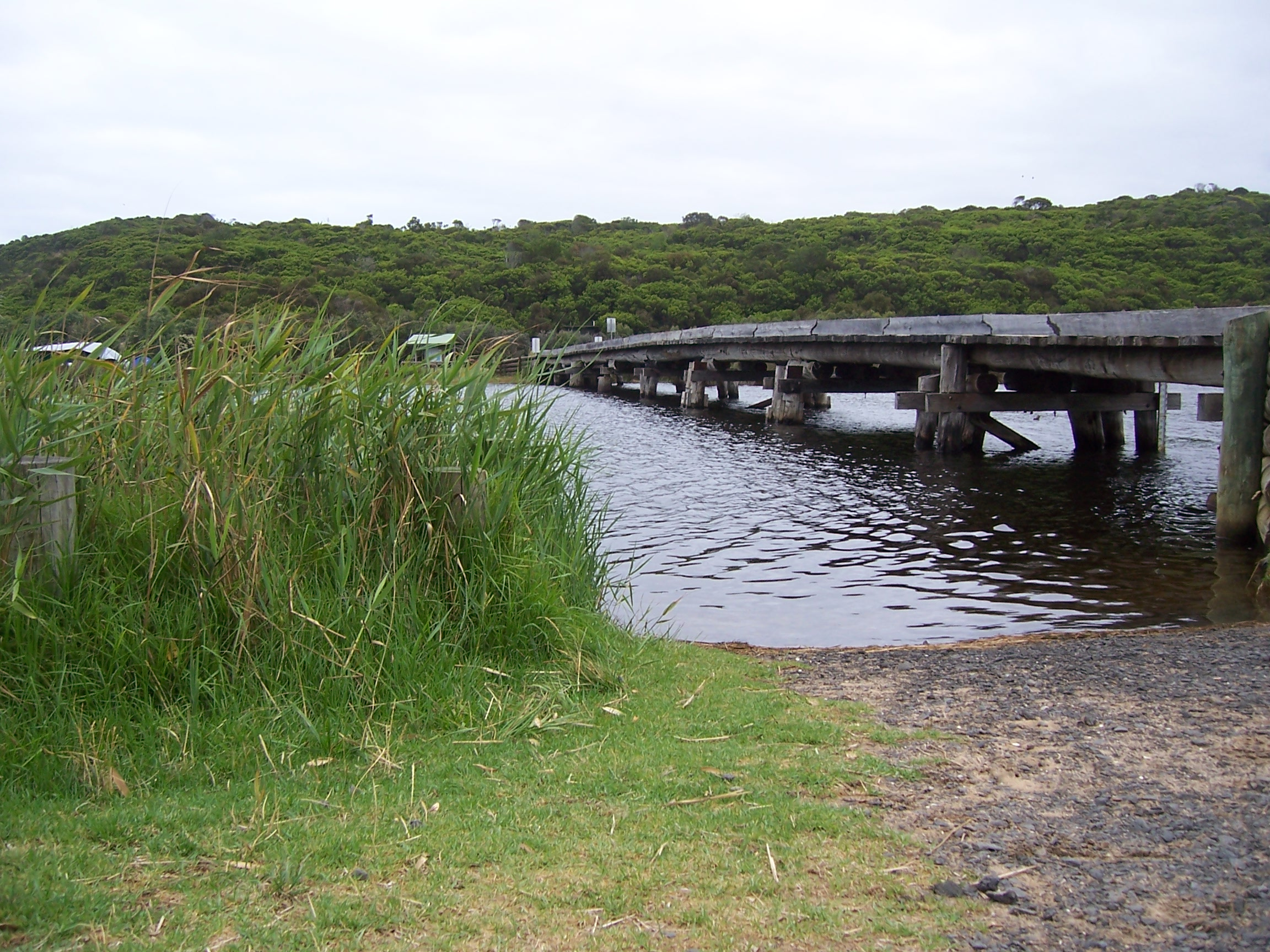
Aire River

Tourism and park officials offer bus services to and from accommodations, ranging from basic camp-sites to modern eco-lodges which utilise alternative energy. There are seven dedicated hike-in camps along the walk at Elliot Ridge, Blanket Bay, Cape Otway, Aire River, Johanna Beach, Ryans Den and Devil's Kitchen. Elliot Ridge, Blanket Bay and Cape Otway have three dedicated group camping areas; with access to the same facilities as the hike-in camp-sites including environmentally friendly toilet, a three-sided shelter and park benches. Blanket Bay, Parker Hill, Aire River and Johanna Beach host drive-in camp-sites.

About $500,000 was spent on constructing the camp-sites, with each selected after taking into account environmental, cultural, geo-technical, experiential, risk, cost and community interests. Over thirty sites were investigated in the planning phase.

Three-sided shelter at Devils Kitchen on the Great Ocean Walk

Each camp-site has between eight and fifteen camping pads, a toilet, untreated rainwater tanks, camp benches and, except for Blanket Bay, a shelter. The Clivus Multrum toilets are a self-contained, waterless, odourless continuous composting system. They were sized above their capacity taking into account climatic factors. Waste material and wood shavings compost in the tanks and the vent pipe to reduce odours. Recycled red gum posts were sought from demolished wharfs at Docklands, which are used as feature posts for the toilets and shelter.

Radial sawn yellow stringybark timbers from East Gippsland have been used for cladding of the buildings. This form of saw log creates minimal waste and features the natural curves of the tree. Native cypress from northern New South Wales and Queensland was sourced for posts and framing to provide resistance to termites and rot. 14 tonnes of material was flown into the camp-sites at Ryans Den and Devils kitchen by helicopter. A JetRanger helicopter carried a maximum load of 600 kg which accounted for the single 7 m long red gum posts. Each camp-site took an average of six weeks to build.

There are two hygiene stations at Blanket Bay and Parker Inlet to reduce the potential spread of Phytophthora cinnamomi. Tracks may be closed and rehabilitated at times, to protect sensitive sand dunes and cultural sites. Sections of disturbed land are re-vegetated with indigenous species.

== History ==
Most of the walks I've done in the past— Kokoda, Mt Kilimanjaro — were about speed and pushing my limits, [In Victoria] I had the chance to slow down, let the camera crew catch up, and take in the beauty of the area.

— Paralympian Michael Milton, "The Art of Walking". Australian Geographic. Archived from the original on 14 May 2010.

The idea to create the Great Ocean Walk was originally rejected in 1974. It was however rumoured to have been resurrected by local accommodation providers in the early 1990s, with planning actually beginning in 1994. Development did not begin until 2001; with the trail finally opening in January 2006. Parks Victoria provided an initial investment of $2.3 million for a 91 kilometre trail between Apollo Bay and the Glenample homestead, near the Twelve Apostles.

Construction efforts included clearing 25 kilometres of previously existing track, with most of the new track constructed by hand using mattocks, shovels and crowbars. Hand built local and imported stone was used for rock steps; put in place by power carriers and Tirfor winches. Elevated steps were built for the steeper terrain. Stepping stones, small rock bridges, and a single timber bridge, were built to cross water areas. Track work has also been performed by volunteers, including Conservation Volunteers Australia, Greencorps, Deakin University, and the regional employment and education Program.

In 2009, extra funding was allocated to build 10 kilometres of additional walking track from Moonlight Head to the Twelve Apostles Visitor Centre, as well as a viewing point for the Twelve Apostles, new trail signage, seats and environmental boot-cleaning stations. The upgrade, worth $1.3 million, was slated to be completed by April 2010. On 25 June 2010, Premier John Brumby announced that $6.3 million was being allocated to upgrade 100 kilometres of walking track for all-season weather access, off-road track realignment, and camp-site extensions at Princetown and Johanna. Parks Victoria allocated $4.2 million for the project, while the state government allocated $2.1 million from the Regional Development Infrastructure Fund.

In June 2026 management of the Great Otway National Park and the Great Ocean Walk transferred to the Great Ocean Road Coast and Parks Authority (GORCAPA).

== The Art of Walking documentary ==
A one-hour documentary by Zach Merch, titled The Art of Walking: Great Ocean Walk, depicted the track as walked by American environmentalist John Francis, German Olympic figure skater Katarina Witt, and paralympic skier Michael Milton - led by Head Ranger Will Cox. The documentary premiered on Australian and New Zealand's National Geographic Channel on 2 May 2010.

== Points of historical interest ==
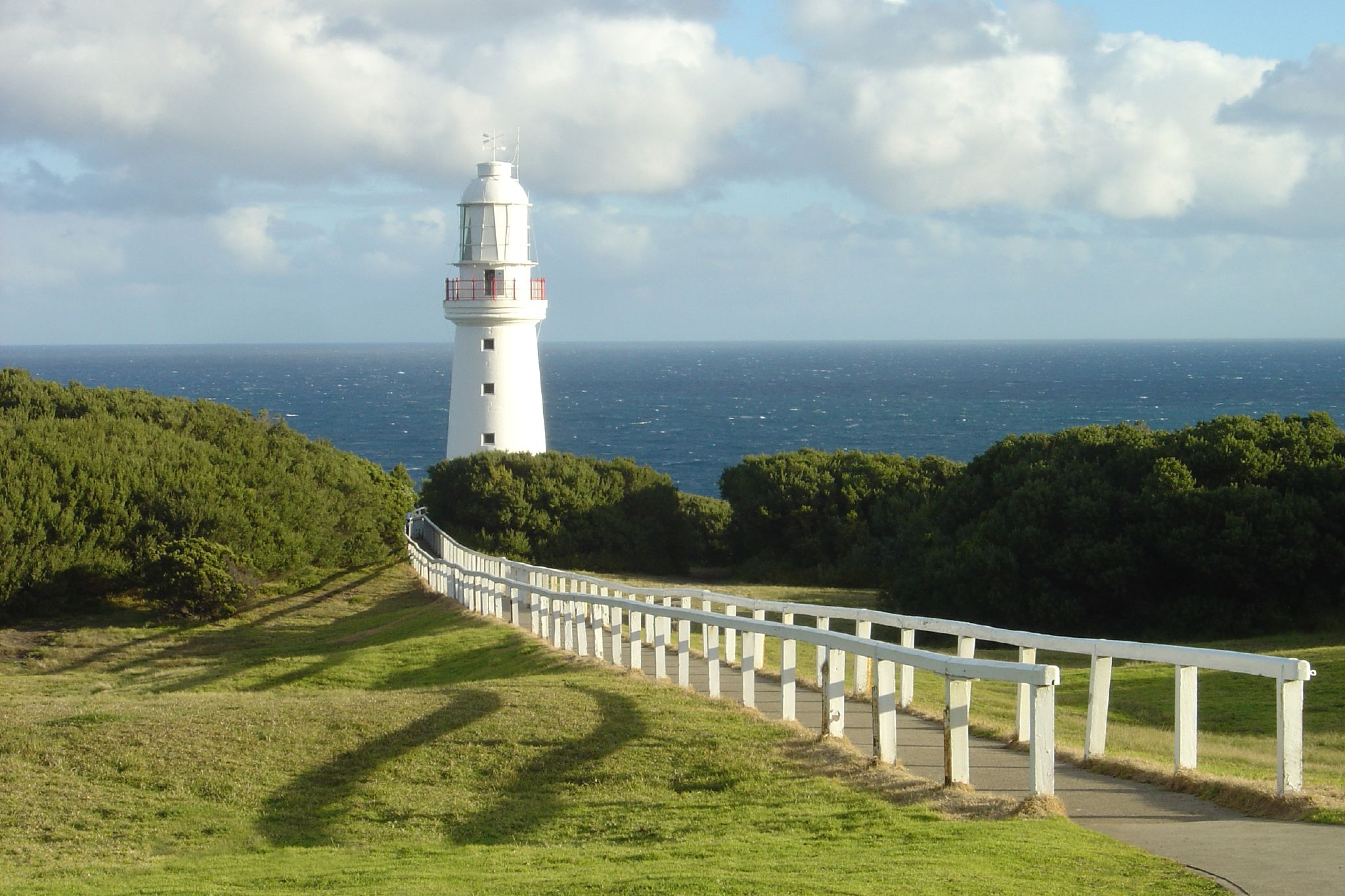
Lighthouse at Cape Otway

The Great Ocean Walk traverses the Otways, an area rich in fossils; including those of a dinosaur that roamed the area 105 million years ago. The area is also littered with various shipwrecks, including the ships Marie Gabrielle (in 1869) and Fiji (in 1891) at Johanna Beach and Wreck Beach respectively. To combat further shipwrecks on the Bass Strait coast and King Island, the Cape Otway light-station was built in 1848; standing 18 meters tall (at 90 metres above sea level). The lighthouse's first operator, Captain James Lawrence, operated the lighthouse for only a few months, as he was constantly drunk and failed to keep the light shining. Besides that, ship captains hailed the lighthouse as ultimately successful in helping them performing a dangerous manoeuvre they referred to as threading the eye of the needle, entering the western entrance of Bass Strait.

Johanna Beach, occasionally used as a site for surfing tournaments, was named after the Joanna vessel that ran aground there, on its maiden voyage from Tasmania in 1843. A single crewman was lost, with the survivors taking an entire week to travel by foot to Geelong, helped by local aborigines.

The historic Glenample Homestead, built by pioneer pastoralist Hugh Gibson in 1869 from locally quarried sandstone, is at the end of the walk. The homestead currently stands as a museum, and displays information about the Loch Ard shipwreck, from which survivors Eva Carmichael and ship apprentice Thomas Pearce were taken to the homestead to recover. The homestead also contained information about early station life, including other shipwrecks and local pastoral history, but the building has been closed indefinitely since 13 September 2007.

== Wildlife ==
Wildlife that can be encountered include koala, sulphur-crested cockatoos, rosella, echidna, wallaby and fairy penguins, kangaroo, peregrine falcon, hooded dotterel, tiger snake, brown snake, and wedge-tailed eagles. There are also abundant spots, where hikers can see southern right whales and fur seal. Hikers are told how to react to possible encounters with dangerous animals (snakes) at the mandatory orientation session prior to starting the walk.

== See also ==
- Apollo Bay, Victoria
- Great Ocean Road
