= Ford River (Victoria) =

Perennial river in Victoria, Australia

Ford
- Location of the Ford River mouth in Victoria

Location
- Country: Australia
- State: Victoria
- Region: South East Coastal Plain (IBRA), The Otways
- Local government area: Colac Otway Shire

Physical characteristics
- Source: Otway Ranges
  - location: near Lavers Hill
  - coordinates: 38°40′03″S 143°22′28″E
  - elevation: 448 m (1,470 ft)
- Source confluence: East and West Branches of the Ford River
  - coordinates: 38°44′21″S 143°26′7″E
- Mouth: confluence with the Aire River
  - location: east of Glenaire
  - coordinates: 38°46′51″S 143°27′59″E
  - elevation: 0 m (0 ft)
- Length: 15 km (9.3 mi)

Basin features
- River system: Corangamite catchment
- National park: Port Campbell National Park

The Ford River is a perennial river of the Corangamite catchment, in the Otways region of the Australian state of Victoria.

== Location and features ==
The headwaters of the Ford River rise in the Otway Ranges in southwest Victoria, near Lavers Hill, and flows generally east by south through the Port Campbell National Park towards the town of Glenaire where the river heads east and reaches its confluence with the Aire River, northwest of Cape Otway. From its highest point, the river descends 386 metres (1,266 ft) over its 15-kilometre (9.3 mi) course.

== See also ==
- List of rivers of Australia § Victoria
