= Wreck Beach (Corangamite Shire) =

Beach in Corangamite Shire, Victoria, Australia

- Beach
- Anchor of the shipwrecked Marie Gabrielle
- Interactive map of Wreck Beach
- Coordinates: 38°45′18″S 143°12′48″E
- Location: Gellibrand Lower, Victoria, Australia
- Water bodies: Southern Ocean

Dimensions
  - Length: 1.2 kilometres (0.75 mi)
- Hazard rating: 8/10 (highly hazardous)
- Access: Wreck Beach Track

Wreck Beach is a coastal beach near Moonlight Head on the Great Ocean Road coast of south-western Victoria, Australia. The beach is approximately 1.2 kilometres (0.75 mi) long and lies below high coastal bluffs west of Cat Reef. It is named after the wreck of the French sailing vessel Marie Gabrielle in 1869. The beach is the site of another wreck, the Fiji, with its anchor also left on the beach.

== History ==
The Marie Gabrielle, a French vessel carrying tea from China to Melbourne, was driven ashore during a gale in November 1869. The crew reached land safely, and 11 men subsequently made their way to the lighthouse at Cape Otway after several days travelling along the coast. An anchor and other remains from wreck can still be seen on the beach when tidal conditions permit.

On 6 September 1891, the Fiji, whilst travelling from Hamburg to Melbourne with general cargo, struck offshore rocks. After a crew member reached shore and encountered a surveying party, assistance was sought from the Port Campbell rocket crew. A line was successfully fire to the vessel, but a number of crew members were lost during the rescue attempt. Local resident Arthur Wilkinson also died after entering the water in an attempt to assist one of the men. An anchor from the Fiji remains embedded in the shore platform farther along the beach from the Marie Gabrielle wreck site.

The Fiji anchor

In the early twentieth century, residents raised money to prepare and fence a racecourse, situated above the beach, with the first meeting held in 1905. Racing was generally held annually until the First World War.

In January 2018, large numbers of buoy barnacles washed ashore at the beach following a storm. The species lives suspended beneath a gas-filled float secreted by the animal and is only occasionally observed ashore.

== Geography and features ==
Wreck Beach lies below bluffs ranging from approximately 20 to 80 metres (66 to 262 ft) in height and faces south-west toward the Southern Ocean. The beach is formed by a continuous strip of sand divided into six semi-circular bays, each separated by rocky shore platforms. Offshore reefs occur along much of the beach, while Cat Reef lies immediately to the east. Beyond a small headland, Moonlight Beach continues for a further 400 metres (1,300 ft).

Wave heights commonly exceed 1.5 metres (4 ft 11 in), and the combination of reef, sand and exposed ocean swells create a complex surf zone. Wreck Beach contains four large, persistent rip currents, while another occurs off Moonlight Beach. The rips generally flow seaward through gaps in the offshore reef system. Moonlight Beach has a more continuous reef.

Swimming conditions are hazardous because of the persistent rip currents, submerged reefs and exposure to open-ocean swell. Rock pools exposed at low tide can provide comparatively sheltered water, although deeper channels between reefs may contain strong rip currents. The beach is also used for surfing and fishing, with reef breaks developing under suitable conditions and deeper rip channels providing access to offshore water.

The Marie Gabrielle anchor is approximately 400 metres (1,300 ft) from the foot of the access steps, with the Fiji anchor farther along the shoreline. Access to these sites depends on tide and sea conditions, as sections of the shore platform and beach can become inaccessible during high tide or rough weather.

== Access ==
The beach is reached from a car park near Moonlight Head. A gravel access road leads from the Great Ocean Road to the car park, from which a steep stairway of 366 steps descends to the beach.

== See also ==
- Peterborough Beach
- Johanna Beach
- Princetown Beach
- Torquay Surf Beach
- Port Campbell Beach
- Jan Juc Beach
- Great Ocean Road
