= Glenaire Beach =

Beach in Victoria, Australia

Glenaire Beach Aire River Beach
- Beach
- Interactive map of Glenaire Beach
- Coordinates: 38°48′29″S 143°27′50″E
- Location: Glenaire, Victoria, Australia
- Water bodies: Southern Ocean

Dimensions
  - Length: 0.75 kilometres (0.47 mi)
- Hazard rating: 7/10 (highly hazardous)
- Access: Sand Road

Glenaire Beach is an exposed ocean beach at the mouth of the Aire River on the Great Ocean Road coast of south-western Victoria, Australia. The beach faces south-west toward the Southern Ocean and is bordered by coastal sand dunes, rocky shoreline and the lower Aire River lagoon. A smaller adjoining beach, Glenaire East Beach, lies immediately to the east. The area is used for surfing and recreational fishing, although the open-ocean surf is characterised by strong rip currents and is hazardous for swimming.

== Geography and features ==
The Aire River reaches the coast through a gap approximately 500 metres (1,600 ft) wide between masses of dune calcarenite. These consolidated dune deposits were formed from wind-blown sand over several hundred thousand years, while younger unconsolidated sand in the area was deposited during approximately the past 6,000 years. Near the coast, the lower river broadens into an elongated lagoon that is commonly separated from the sea by a sand barrier.

Glenaire Beach and Glenaire East Beach both face south-west and are exposed to persistent Southern Ocean swell, with average wave heights exceeding 1.5 metres (4 ft 11 in). The surf zone extends to about 200 metres (660 ft) in width in places and contains detached sand bars and strong rip currents. Rips commonly occur at intervals of roughly 300 metres (980 ft) and may also form beside larger rocks. Glenaire Beach usually contains two major rip channels, while Glenaire East Beach is typically dominated by a single large rip.

The exposed conditions make the surf unsuitable for most swimmers, with the sheltered lagoon providing a safer alternative when conditions permit. Surfing occurs along the beach, particularly during smaller swells and northerly winds, although the quality of the beach breaks varies according to the position and shape of the sand banks.

The river, lagoon and beach are also used for recreational fishing. Surf fishing is concentrated around deeper holes and gutters in the beach, while estuary fishing occurs farther upstream along the Aire River.

== Access ==
Access is from the road to the riverside camping area within the national park. From there, a walking track follows the Aire River toward the coast and continues to Glenaire Beach.

== See also ==
- Wreck Beach
- Princetown Beach
- Port Campbell Beach
- Jan Juc Beach
- Great Ocean Road
