= Redwater Creek =

Creek in South Dakota and Wyoming, US

Coordinates: 44°34′37.52″N 104°11′36.44″W

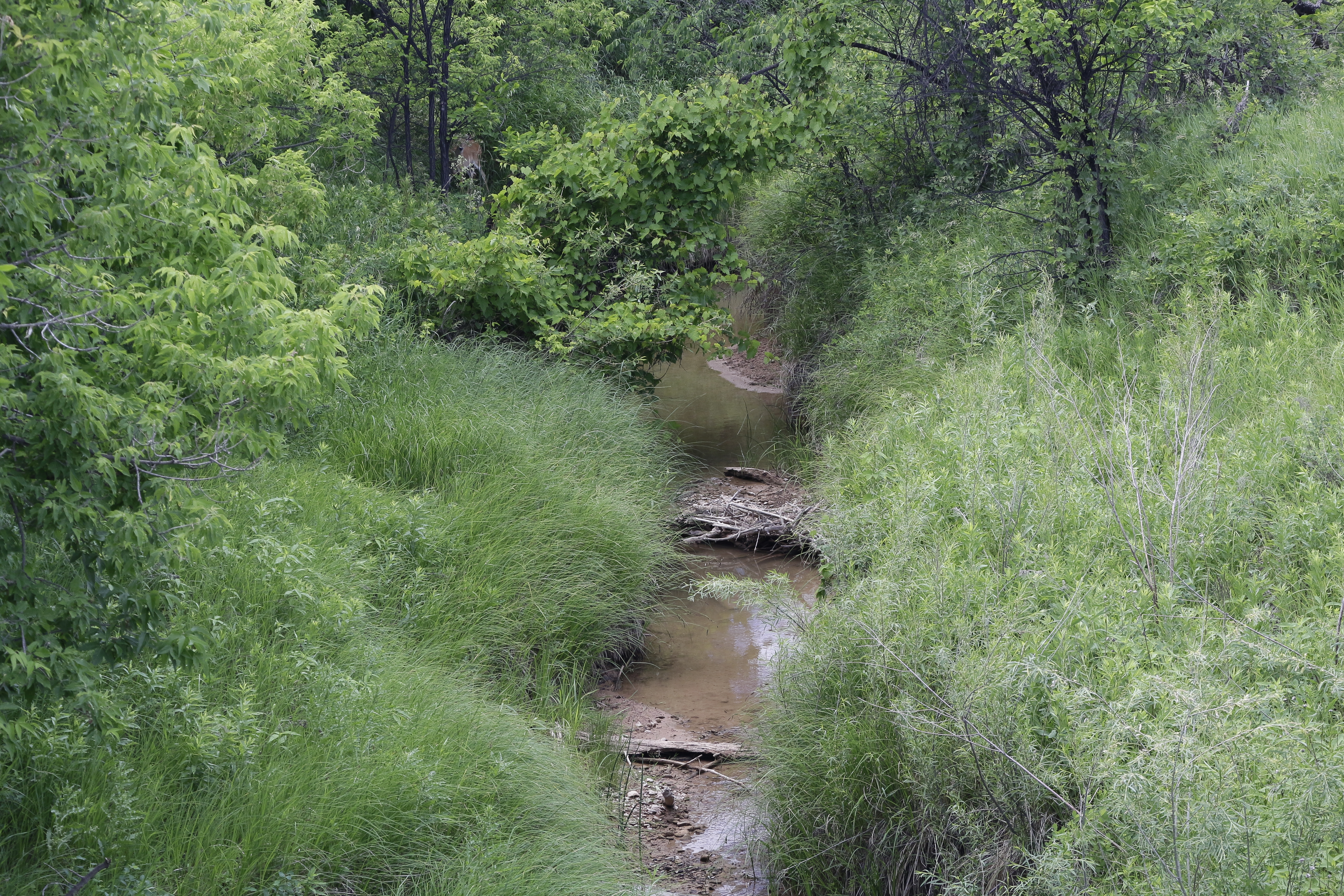
- Redwater Creek from Redwater Road in Beulah, Wyoming, June 2017

Location
- Country: United States
- State: Wyoming

Redwater Creek is a stream in Butte and Lawrence counties in South Dakota and Crook County, Wyoming in the United States. It is a tributary of the Redwater River.

The creek's name comes from the Sioux Indians of the area, for the color of the river water.

== See also ==
- List of rivers of South Dakota
- List of rivers of Wyoming
