= Wild Dog Cove =

Beach in Peterborough, Victoria, Australia

Wild Dog Cove Crazy Kate
- Beach
- Interactive map of Wild Dog Cove
- Coordinates: 38°36′16″S 142°52′12″E
- Location: Peterborough, Victoria, Australia
- Water bodies: Wild Dog Cove (Southern Ocean)

Dimensions
  - Length: 0.5 kilometres (0.31 mi)
- Hazard rating: 4/10 (moderately hazardous)
- Access: Great Ocean Road, Macs Street, Schomberg Road

Wild Dog Cove is a small coastal bay west of Peterborough, on the Great Ocean Road in south-western Victoria, Australia. The approximately 500 metres (1,600 ft)-wide bay contains several small beaches and extensive limestone reefs, with a longer beach running beside the Great Ocean Road. Much of the shoreline is backed by low limestone cliffs and a foreshore reserve. The sheltered reefs and rock pools are used for paddling, snorkelling and coastal recreation, although the beaches are unpatrolled and conditions vary with tide and weather.

== Geography and features ==
Wild Dog Cove is a roughly circular, south-facing bay with about 1 kilometre (0.62 mi) of shoreline. It is backed in places by reddish limestone cliffs approximately 10 metres (33 ft) high, while the shallow floor of the bay contains extensive limestone reefs. These reefs reduce much of the incoming wave energy, and the beaches commonly experience low waves or calm conditions, particularly around low tide.

Five beaches occur within the cove. Four small pocket beaches are arranged along the eastern side of the bay, each situated beneath the limestone bluffs and partly sheltered by the shallow reef system. Access to these smaller beaches is by steps or by descending the bluffs. The main beach is approximately 500 metres (1,600 ft) long and follows the alignment of the Great Ocean Road. It is backed by vegetated bluffs, with a small car park and stair access near the centre of the beach.

Large areas of reef are exposed as the tide falls, creating rock pools and shallow channels across parts of the bay. These areas are used for paddling and snorkelling. A locally named section near the access steps is known as 'Crazy Kate', while the opposite end of the main beach contains a natural rock arch that can be reached at low tide.

Although the inner parts of the cove are generally more sheltered than the open coast around Peterborough, conditions are affected by tide and swell. The beaches are relatively sheltered and bathing is generally easier around higher tide, when more of the reef is covered. Hazards include deep water, slippery rocks and unstable cliffs, and the cove is not patrolled.

Surfing is largely confined to the outer reef system, while fishing is generally more productive from the outer rocks than within the shallow central part of the bay. The foreshore reserve extends behind the beaches and provides access from the Great Ocean Road. Dogs are permitted at Wild Dog Cove Beach but are required to be kept on a leash.

== See also ==
- Worm Bay
- Peterborough Beach
- Princetown Beach
- Glenaire Beach
- Jan Juc Beach
- Great Ocean Road
