= Aire River (Victoria) =

River in Victoria, Australia

Aire
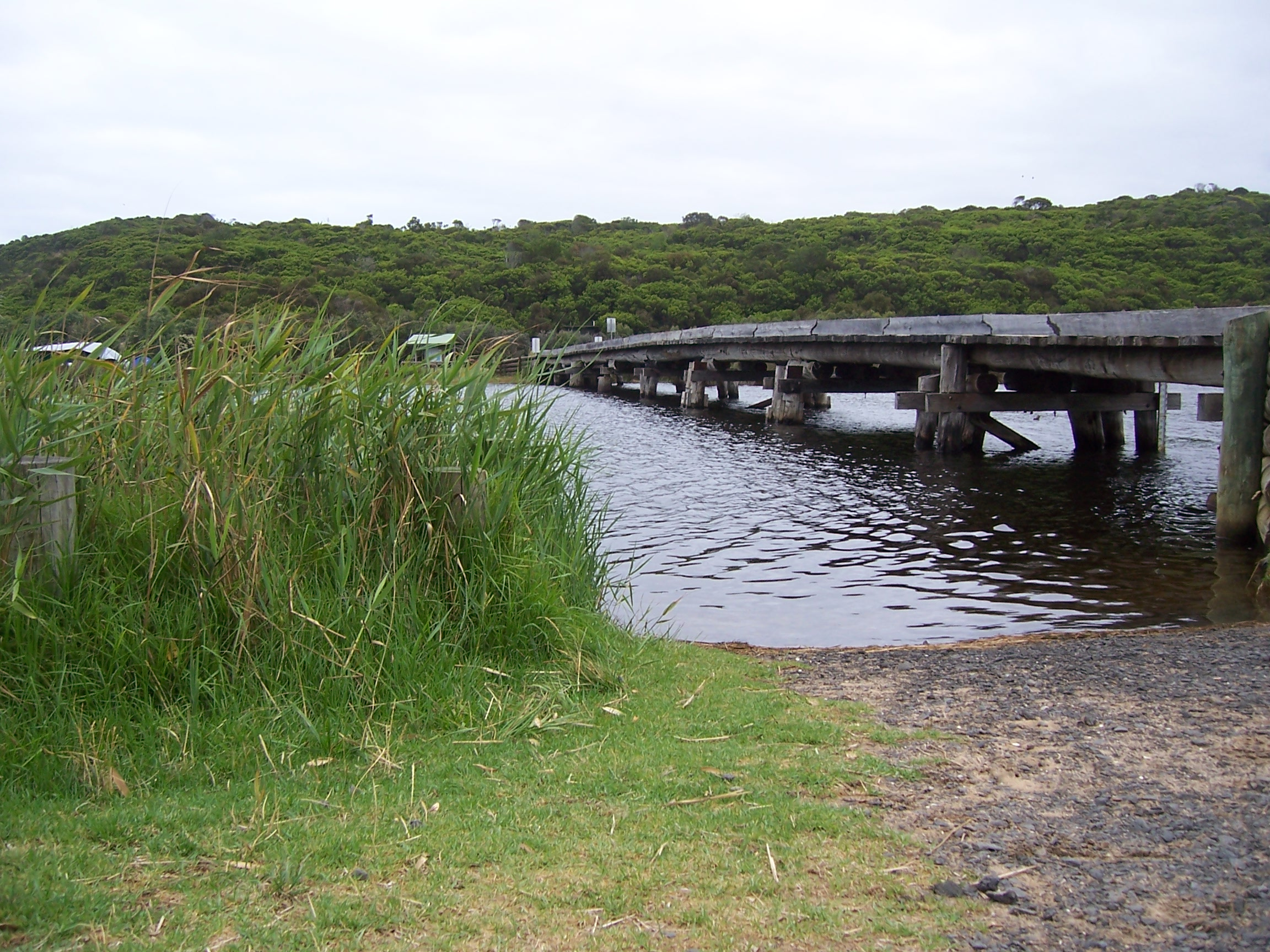
- The Great Ocean Walk across the Aire River, in 2007

- Location of the Aire River mouth in Victoria
- Etymology: After the River Aire.

Location
- Country: Australia
- State: Victoria
- Region: South East Coastal Plain (IBRA), The Otways
- Local government area: Colac Otway Shire

Physical characteristics
- Source: Otway Ranges
  - location: near Beech Forest
  - coordinates: 38°38′42″S 143°38′25″E
  - elevation: 554 m (1,818 ft)
- Mouth: Bass Strait
  - location: west of Cape Otway
  - coordinates: 38°48′26″S 143°27′32″E
  - elevation: 0 m (0 ft)
- Length: 40 km (25 mi)

Basin features
- River system: Corangamite catchment
- Tributaries
  - left: Redwater Creek
  - right: Young Creek (Victoria), Little Aire Creek
- Waterfalls: Hopetoun Falls
- National park: Great Otway National Park

The Aire River is a perennial river of the Corangamite catchment, in the Otways region of the Australian state of Victoria.

== Location and features ==
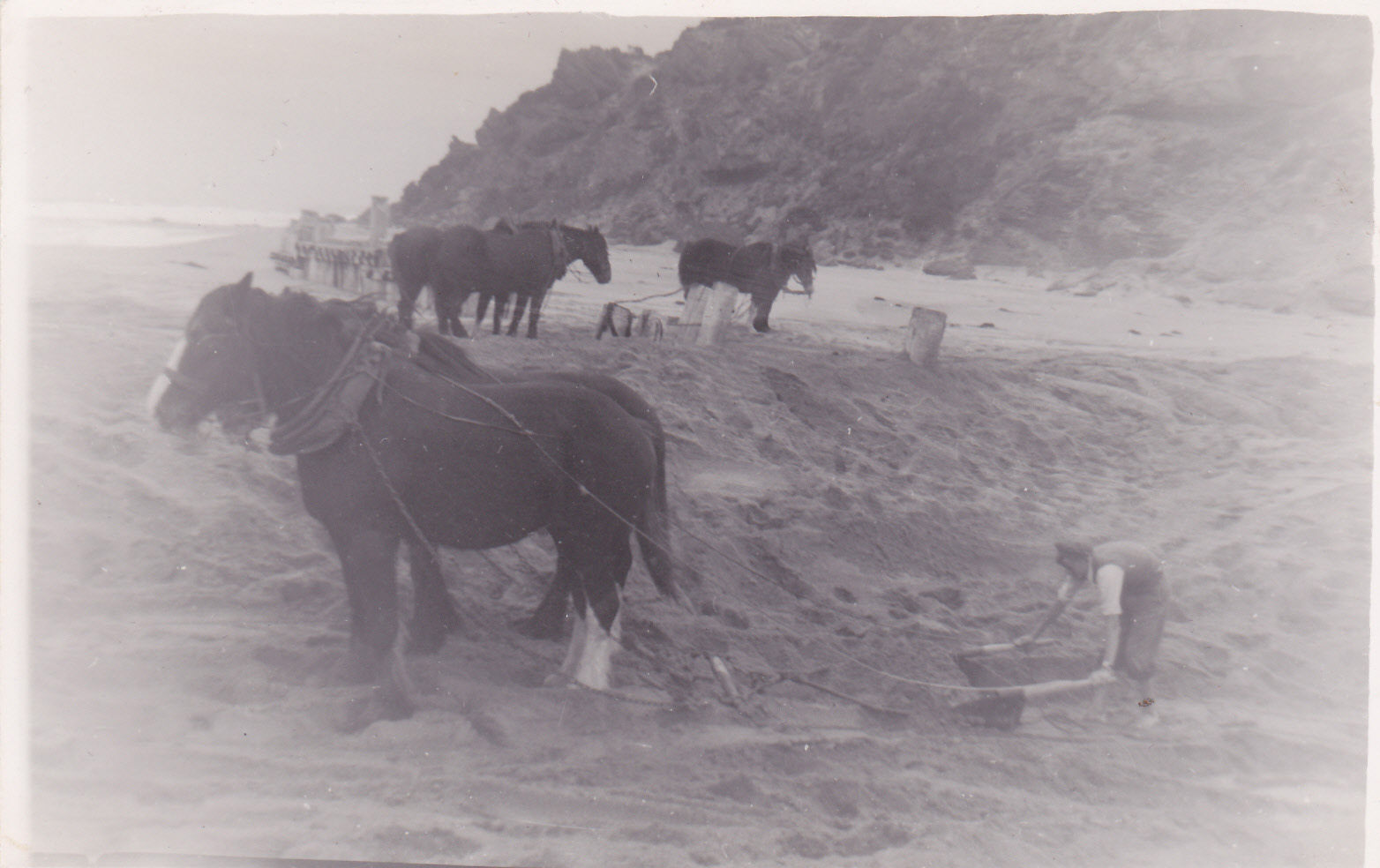
Horse teams used in 1948 to unblock the river mouth to prevent salt water being deposited on the arable river flats

The Aire River rises below the Otway Ranges in a remote forestry area southeast of the locality of Beech Forest. The river generally flows west by south then south through the Great Otway National Park, joined by three minor tributaries, before reaching its mouth and emptying into Bass Strait west of Cape Otway. The river descends 555 metres (1,821 ft) over its 40 kilometres (25 mi) course; including a 49 metres (161 ft) descent over the Hopetoun Falls in its upper reaches, located at an elevation of 314 metres (1,030 ft) above sea level.

The river is traversed by the Great Ocean Road and the Great Ocean Walk near the river's mouth.

It was named by the surveyor George Smythe after the River Aire in Yorkshire, England.

== See also ==
- List of rivers of Australia § Victoria
