= Moonlight Head =

- Coordinates: 38°46′11.5″S 143°14′20.5″E
- Country: Australia
- State: Victoria
- LGA: Corangamite Shire
- Location: 200 km (120 mi) SW of Melbourne; 90 km (56 mi) E of Warrnambool

Government
  - State electorate: Polwarth
  - Federal division: Wannon
- Postcode: 3269
- Mean max temp: 20 °C (68 °F)
- Mean min temp: 7.5 °C (45.5 °F)
- Annual rainfall: 80.9 mm (3.19 in)

Moonlight Head is a locality located on the Great Ocean Road in southwest of Victoria on the Southern Ocean. It is believed to be the headland seen by Matthew Flinders from the Investigator during a break in showery weather, on the night of 20 April 1802.

It is notable for the vertical cliffs up to 50 metres high, which in some places overhang, and expose geological structures such as cross bedding, scour and fill channels and variable sizes of concretions. There is also a sea cave and a massive active landslip, which extends inland for 500 metres. As a consequence amethyst stones, which give the place its name, can be found on the pebbly beach.

This stretch of the coast is renowned for its shipwrecks, with the ship, Fiji wrecked just off the head in 1891 and the Marie Gabrielle wrecked on 25 November 1869.

An Aboriginal shell midden was excavated in a rock shelter at Moonlight Head and was found to have been occupied between 1030 BP and 180 BP when excavated by archaeologist David Frankel. This was probably one of the places occupied by the Ngarowurd gundidj clan identified by George Augustus Robinson’s Gadubanud informants. The find extended the known period of Aboriginal presence on this part of the Otway coast.
