= Peterborough Beach =

Beach in Peterborough, Victoria, Australia

Peterborough Beach Newfield Bay Beach
- Beach
- Peterborough Beach, with 'The Spit' in the centre, obscuring Newfield Bay Beach
- Interactive map of Peterborough Beach
- Coordinates: 38°36′32″S 142°53′13″E
- Location: Peterborough, Victoria, Australia
- Water bodies: Newfield Bay (Southern Ocean)

Dimensions
  - Length: Peterborough Beach: 0.8 kilometres (0.50 mi); Newfield Bay Beach: 0.7 kilometres (0.43 mi); Both: 1.3 kilometres (0.81 mi)
- Hazard rating: 5/10 (moderately hazardous) (Peterborough); 6/10 (moderately hazardous) (Newfield Bay)
- Access: Great Ocean Road, Irvine Street

Peterborough Beach is an ocean beach at Peterborough, on the Great Ocean Road in south-western Victoria, Australia. It lies immediately east of the mouth of Curdies Inlet, with Newfield Bay Beach occupying the eastern side of the same coastal sand barrier. Both beaches are partly sheltered by offshore reefs and are among the more readily accessible beaches along this section of the coast. Peterborough Beach is approximately 800 metres (2,600 ft) long, while Newfield Bay Beach extends for about 700 metres (2,300 ft).

== Geography and features ==
Peterborough is situated at the mouth of Curdies Inlet, a coastal lagoon separated from the ocean by a sand barrier approximately 1.5 kilometres (0.93 mi) long and 300 to 400 metres (980 to 1,310 ft) wide. The barrier includes dunes rising to about 10 to 20 metres (33 to 66 ft) and a cuspate foreland formed in the lee of Schomberg Reef. Peterborough Beach lies on the western side of this foreland, while Newfield Bay Beach occupies its eastern side. The Great Ocean Road follows the landward side of the barrier before crossing Curdies Inlet into Peterborough.

Peterborough Beach faces south-south-west and is sheltered to some extent by offshore reefs and reefs near the entrance to Curdies Inlet. It generally has a steep beach face and is characterised by surging waves rather than a broad surf zone. When the inlet is closed by sand, the area near its mouth is generally more sheltered than the open sections of beach. Larger swells can produce stronger shorebreaks and rip currents.

Newfield Bay Beach faces south and is also partly protected from ocean swell by offshore reefs. Conditions vary along the beach, with the section nearest the reef generally being steeper and lacking a substantial sand bar, while toward the eastern car park the waves are somewhat larger and an attached bar becomes more developed. Rip currents are more likely in this section, including a persistent rip near the eastern end below the car park.

Both beaches are used for swimming, although conditions become more hazardous during larger swells. The inlet mouth, particularly when closed, generally provides the more protected swimming area. Rock platforms and other intertidal areas around Peterborough are exposed at low tide but may be rapidly covered as the tide rises or during larger waves.

Surfing conditions are generally limited by the reefs and steep beach profiles, although beach breaks commonly form near the Newfield Bay car park. Smaller beach breaks an also develop around the mouth of Curdies Inlet, particularly under suitable swell conditions, while much of the remaining shoreline is characterised by shorebreaks.

Curdies Inlet and the surrounding beaches are also used for recreational fishing. Fishing occurs within the lagoon, around the inlet entrance and from nearby beaches and rock platforms. Salmon and bream may be caught within the inlet at different times of the year, while boats can sometimes be launched in calm conditions to fish offshore reefs for species including snapper, gummy shark and trevally.

== Access ==
Access to Peterborough Beach is available from parking and picnic areas near Frenchs Bridge (the bridge over Curdies Inlet) and, when the inlet is closed, from the Peterborough foreshore reserve. Newfield Bay Beach is accessible from the Great Ocean Road, with a parking area near its eastern end. Both beaches are close to the facilities of Peterborough.

== See also ==
- Crofts Beach
- Wild Dog Cove
- Thirteenth Beach
- Torquay Surf Beach
- Torquay Front Beach
- Jan Juc Beach
- Great Ocean Road
