= Bay of Islands Coastal Park =

Coastal reserve in Victoria, Australia

Coordinates: 38°33′47″S 142°46′48″E

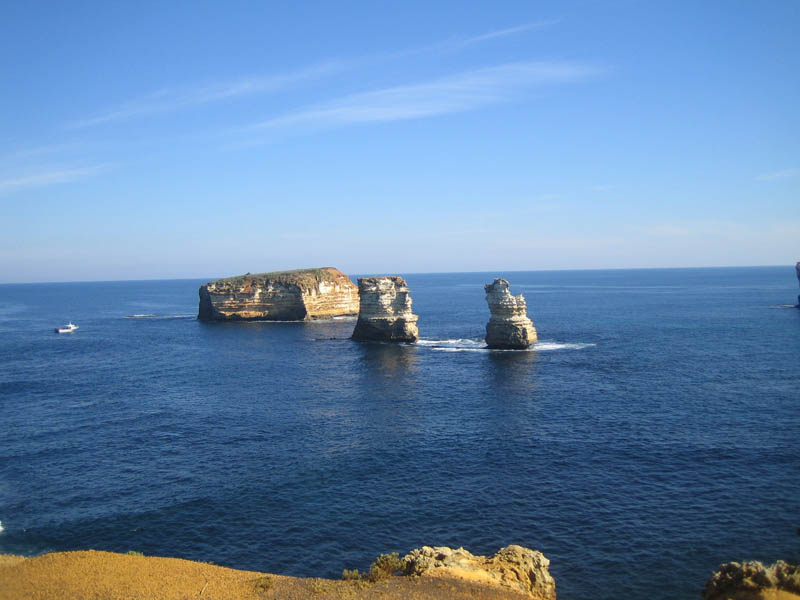
Bay of Islands

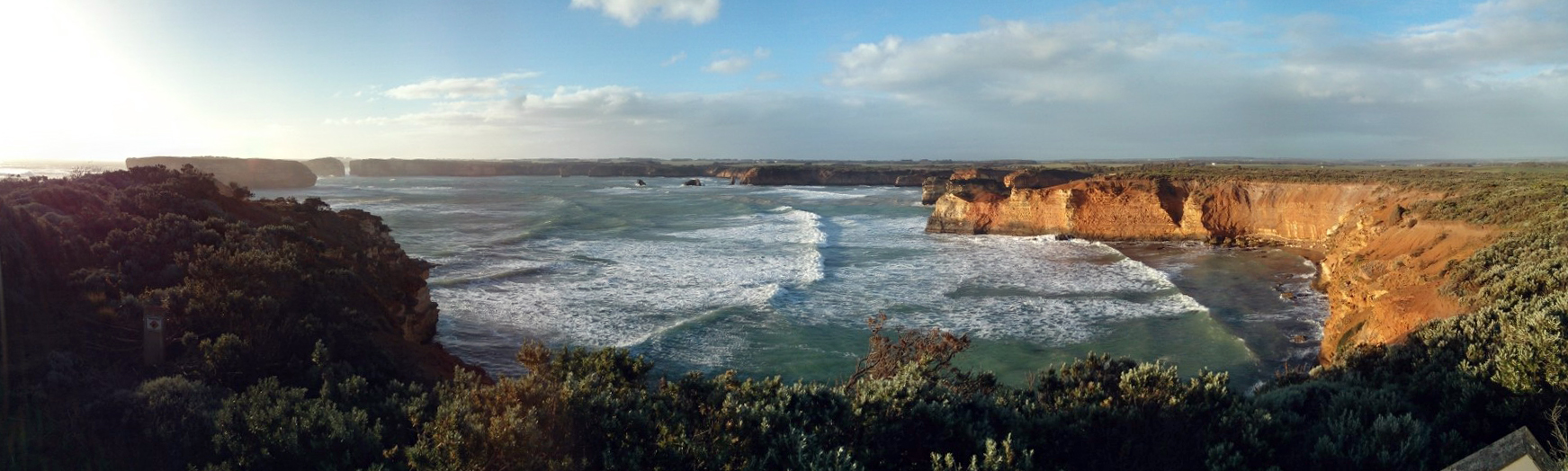
The Bay of Islands near sunset.

Bay of Islands Coastal Park is a 32 kilometres (20 miles) long coastal reserve located in Victoria, Australia on the Great Ocean Road between Peterborough and Warrnambool. Lookout areas with parking are provided at the Bay of Martyrs, the Bay of Islands, Three Mile Beach and Childers Cove.
