= Princetown Beach =

Beach in Victoria, Australia

- Beach
- Part of Princetown Beach, looking toward Point Ronald, and the mouth of the Gellibrand River
- Interactive map of Princetown Beach
- Coordinates: 38°42′25″S 143°09′32″E
- Location: Princetown, Victoria, Australia
- Water bodies: Southern Ocean

Dimensions
  - Length: 3 kilometres (1.9 mi)
- Hazard rating: 7/10 (highly hazardous)
- Access: Old Coach Road

Princetown Beach is a beach at the mouth of the Gellibrand River outside of Princetown, on the Great Ocean Road in south-western Victoria, Australia. The beach lies immediately east of Point Ronald and forms the westernmost part of a series of beaches extending for approximately 3 kilometres (1.9 mi) along the coast. It is situated within the Twelve Apostles Marine National Park and is characterised by an exposed surf zone, coarse sand, strong rip currents and a largely undeveloped coastal setting.

== Geography, geology and features ==
The Gellibrand River reaches the Southern Ocean beside Point Ronald, a coastal headland approximately 50 metres (160 ft) high. The headland is composed largely of calcarenite formed from wind-blown sand desposited during the Pleistocene, overlying older geological formations. Cross-bedding visible in the cliff face records successive episodes of sand deposition, while erosion by the Gellibrand River has cut through the calcarenite ridge and exposed the underlying rock.

East of Point Ronald, a continuous surf zone extends for about 3 kilometres (1.9 mi) in front of a series of five separate beaches. The beaches are divided by limestone and calcarenite bluffs, rocky platforms and small headlands. They generally face south-west and are exposed to ocean swells averaging more than 1.5 metres (4 ft 11 in). The combination of relatively large waves and coarse beach sediment produces alternating sand bars and deep rip channels, with rip systems occurring at intervals along the shoreline.

The main beach has a broad vegetated dune field, reaching approximately 1 kilometre (0.62 mi) in width, extending inland behind the beach. The river enters the ocean near the western end, and a large rip current commonly forms through the adjacent surf zone.

The exposed nature of the coast produces steep beach profiles, strong shoreward and seaward currents and deep rip channels close to the shoreline. Swimming conditions are therefore hazardous, particularly near the river mouth and during periods of larger swell. The beaches are more commonly used for surfing and fishing, with beach breaks occurring along the coast during lower to moderate swell and northerly winds. The rip channels also create deeper areas used for surf fishing.

The Gellibrand River mouth is periodically blocked by a sand bar, and in 1906, an attempt was made to provide a means of opening the river to the sea by constructing a tunnel through Point Ronald. The tunnel, approximately 90 metres (300 ft) in length, contains gates, intended to assist in releasing water when the entrance became blocked.

The sluice gate entrance and tunnel, seen in the centre

Whilst Princetown Beach lies within the Twelve Apostles Marine National Park, recreational fishing is permitted within an exclusion area extending eastward from the headland toward Rivernook Beach. Fishing also occurs from the surf beach and along the lower Gellibrand River.

== Access ==
Access to Princetown Beach is from Princetown Reserve Road, which leads toward the camping and recreation area near the Gellibrand River. From the parking area, a walking track of approximately 500 to 600 metres (1,600 to 2,000 ft) follows the river bank to the beach. The more easterly beaches require longer walks or access by tracks along the national park boundary.

== See also ==
- Peterborough Beach
- Torquay Surf Beach
- Port Campbell Beach
- Wild Dog Cove
- Great Ocean Road
