= Peterborough, Victoria =

Peterborough
- Town
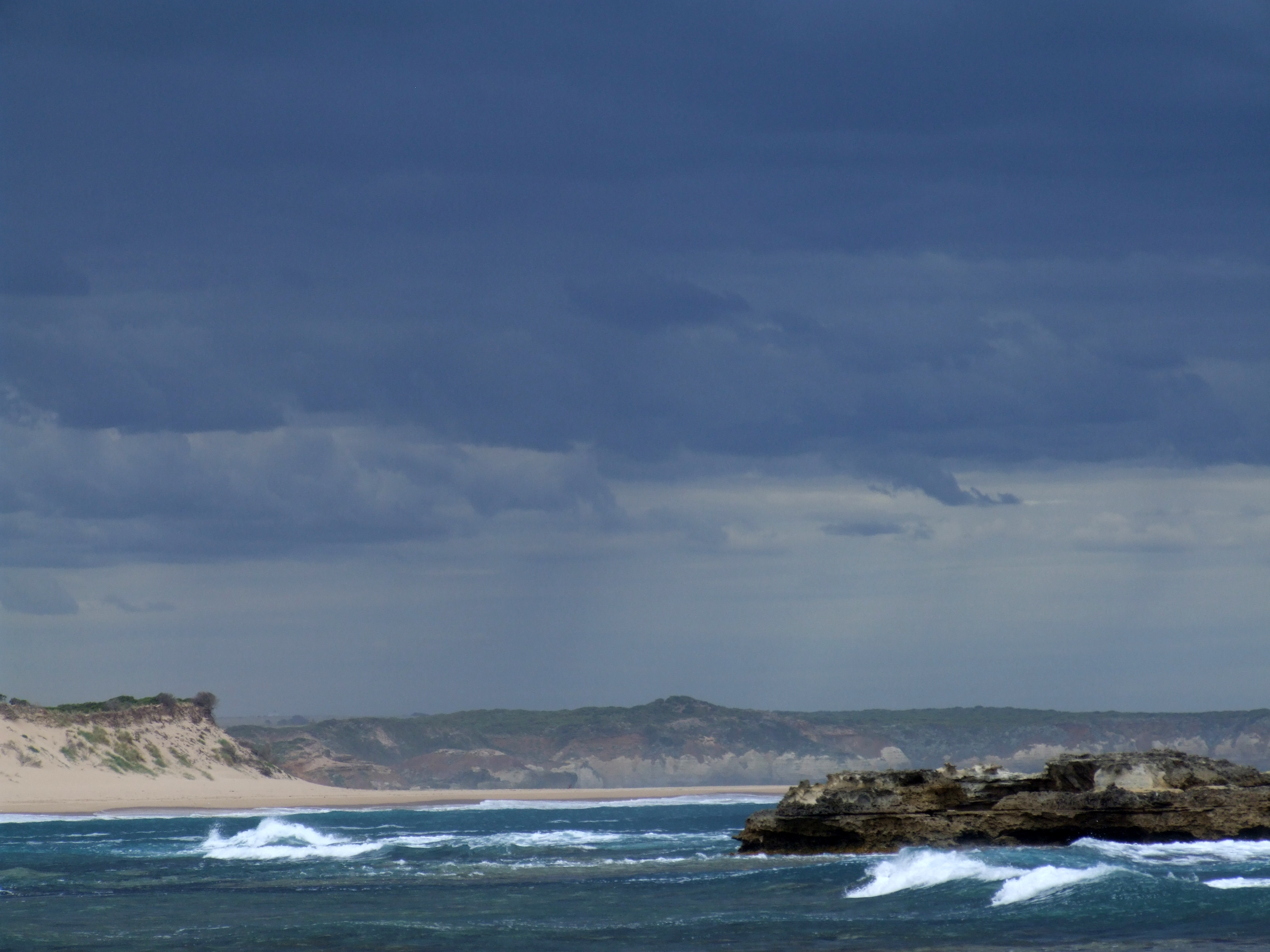

- Coordinates: 38°36′0″S 142°52′0″E
- Country: Australia
- State: Victoria
- LGA: Shire of Moyne
- Location: 235 km (146 mi) W of Melbourne; 54 km (34 mi) E of Warrnambool; 153 km (95 mi) E of Portland

Government
  - State electorate: Polwarth
  - Federal division: Wannon

Population
  - Total: 247 (2016 census)
- Postcode: 3270

Peterborough (/ˈpiːtərbərə/) is a town on the Great Ocean Road in Victoria, Australia, approximately three hours' drive from Melbourne. The town is situated on land to the west side of the mouth of the Curdies River.

== History ==
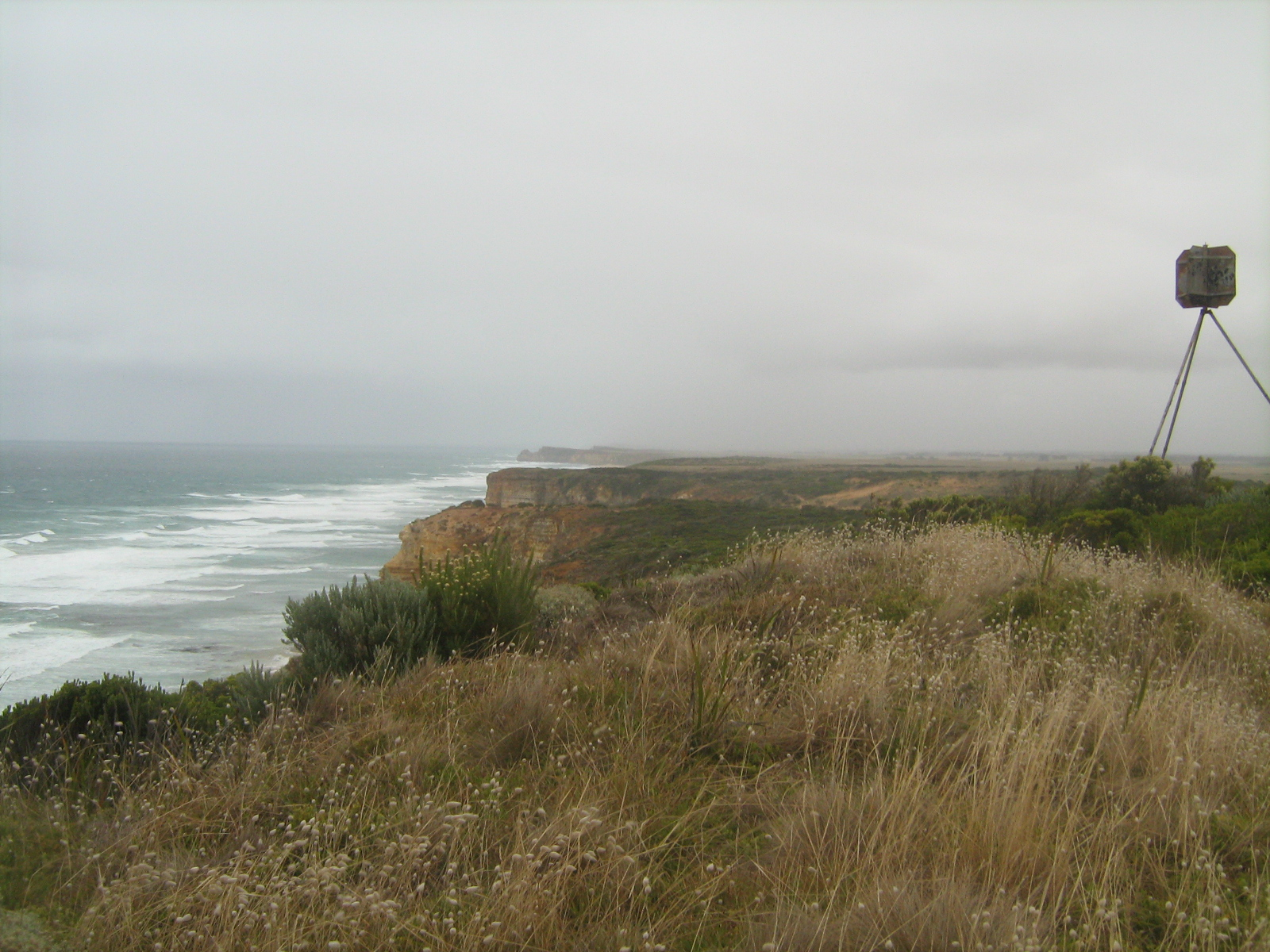
Flaxmans Hill, 13 kilometres (8.1 mi) from Peterborough within the Bay of Islands Coastal Park

Aboriginal peoples occupied the area for thousands of years before European settlement.

In 1845 Dr Daniel Curdie made the difficult journey from his homestead at Tandarook to follow the river to its mouth. He named the area Peterborough after his friend Dr Peter Reid of Richmond.

The town was believed to have been founded when the schooner SS Schomberg was wrecked in the middle of the 19th century, though the town was not sufficiently populated to justify a post office until 10 April 1890. It has since become a fishing and holiday village. There are two public tennis courts and beaches, and a nine-hole golf course at the Peterborough Golf Club on Schomberg Road.

At the 2006 census, Peterborough had a population of 178, which had grown to 247 at the 2016 census.

The town is situated near The Twelve Apostles and London Bridge land formations, and is part of the Shipwreck Coast. Many ships have been wrecked in the vicinity, due to limestone cliffs eroding away and leaving patches of harder rock concealed just under the waves quite a distance out to sea. This erosion continues, evidenced by the London Bridge formation collapsing in the early 1990s. One of the most famous wrecks was the Falls of Halladale which was wrecked in 1908 in thick fog, and became a tourist attraction for the next few years as it remained on the reef it was stuck on.

== Traditional ownership ==
The formally recognised traditional owners for the area in which Peterborough sits are groups within the Eastern Maar people, who are represented by the Eastern Maar Aboriginal Corporation (EMAC).

== Trivia ==
Former Australian Prime Minister Malcolm Fraser owned a property in the town. Fraser was a keen fisherman.
