= Port Campbell Beach =

Beach in Victoria, Australia

- Beach
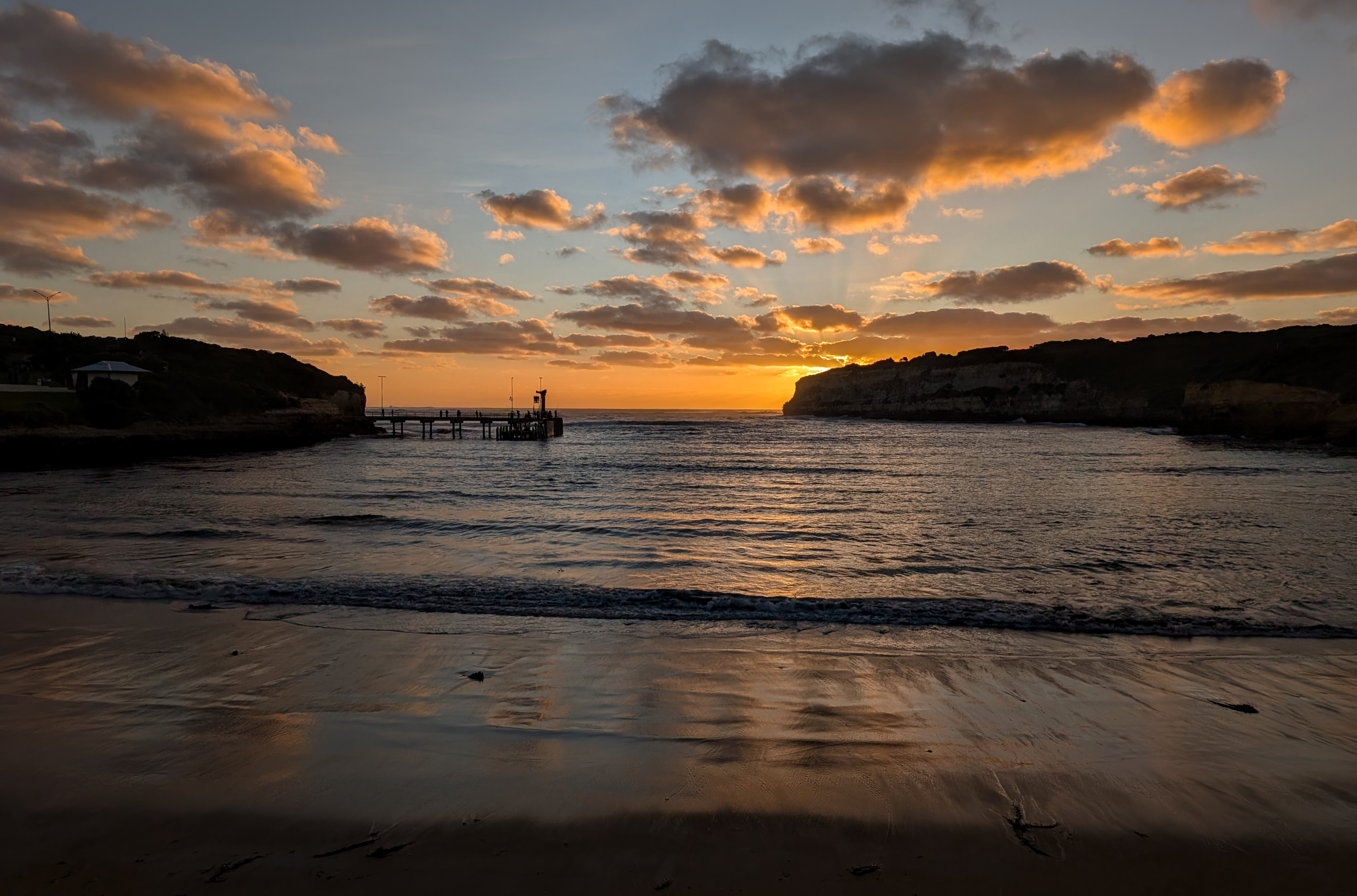
- Port Campbell Beach
- Interactive map of Port Campbell Beach
- Coordinates: 38°37′11″S 142°59′34″E
- Location: Port Campbell, Victoria, Australia
- Water bodies: Port Campbell Bay (Southern Ocean)

Dimensions
  - Length: 0.15 kilometres (0.093 mi)
- Patrolled by: SLSA
- Hazard rating: 4/10 (moderately hazardous)
- Access: Cairns Street, Lord Street

Port Campbell Beach is a small sheltered beach at Port Campbell, on the Great Ocean Road in south-western Victoria, Australia. The beach lies at the inner end of Port Campbell Bay, where the narrow entrance to the bay reduces much of the swell from the Southern Ocean. It is one of the few comparatively sheltered swimming locations along the otherwise exposed coastline around Port Campbell and is patrolled by the Port Campbell Surf Life Saving Club during the summer season. The beach is adjacent to the town centre, with a foreshore reserve, parking, picnic areas and other facilities nearby.

== History ==
European development at Port Campbell occurred comparatively late because of the isolation of this section of the coast. A beacon was established on the headland in 1874, and the town site was surveyed the following year. By 1878, a pier had been constructed near the site of the present Port Campbell jetty. Development of the port was also associated with efforts to improve maritime safety following the wreck of the Lord Ard in 1878. A historic rocket shed used in early coastal rescue operations survives near the harbour.

The Port Campbell Surf Life Saving Club was established in 1963 and operates from the foreshore behind the beach. The club patrols the beach and provides surf lifesaving services for visitors to Port Campbell and the surrounding Great Ocean Road coastline.

== Geography and features ==
Port Campbell Beach is approximately 150m long and occupies the inner end of a partly infilled coastal valley about 200 wide. The beach is bounded by the eastern side of the valley at one end and the mouth of Port Campbell Creek at the other. A foreshore reserve, car park, caravan park and the lifesaving club are situated immediately behind it.

The narrow entrance to Port Campbell Bay shelters the beach from much of the direct ocean swell, with waves at the beach averaging about 0.5 metres (1 ft 8 in). The beach has a moderately steep profile and is fronted by a narrow, continuous sand bar. Rip currents are uncommon under normal conditions but can develop during larger seas. Storm waves can also remove sand from the beach and expose the underlying rocky surface, and erosion at the rear of the beach has resulted in the construction of a low seawall.

The sheltered waters within the bay are used for swimming, wading and paddling, although deeper water occurs relatively close to shore. The inshore reef is also used for snorkelling. Swimming conditions become more hazardous during large swells, when heavier shorebreaks and rip currents can occur. Rocks at either side of the beach are exposed to ocean swell and can also present hazards during rough conditions.

The Port Campbell jetty extends into the bay and is used for recreational fishing, while professional fishing boats are also launched from the harbour area. The beach, Port Campbell Creek and the creek mouth are used for shore-based fishing. During sufficiently large swells, a reef off the western point of the bay can produce a left-breaking surf wave, although the beach itself normally receives only small waves.

=== Two Mile ===
Two Mile is a deep-water reef break situated offshore from the Port Campbell harbour area. Unlike the comparatively sheltered waters of Port Campbell Beach, it is exposed to large Southern Ocean swells and generally begins to break only when swell conditions are substantial. The break is offshore in northerly to north-westerly winds and produces a large wave over the reef.

The break has been surfed in waves of around 15 feet (4.6 m) and, substantially larger waves have also been recorded there. Because of its size, exposed position and the distance from shore, Two Mile is regarded as a surf break requiring considerable big-wave experience.

== See also ==
- Thirteenth Beach
- Princetown Beach
- Wreck Beach
- Torquay Surf Beach
- Torquay Front Beach
- Jan Juc Beach
- Great Ocean Road
