= List of places of worship in Moyne Shire =

This is a list of places of worship in the Shire of Moyne, a local government area in the state of Victoria, Australia. The list includes active and former churches and other religious buildings representing a variety of Christian denominations and other faiths.

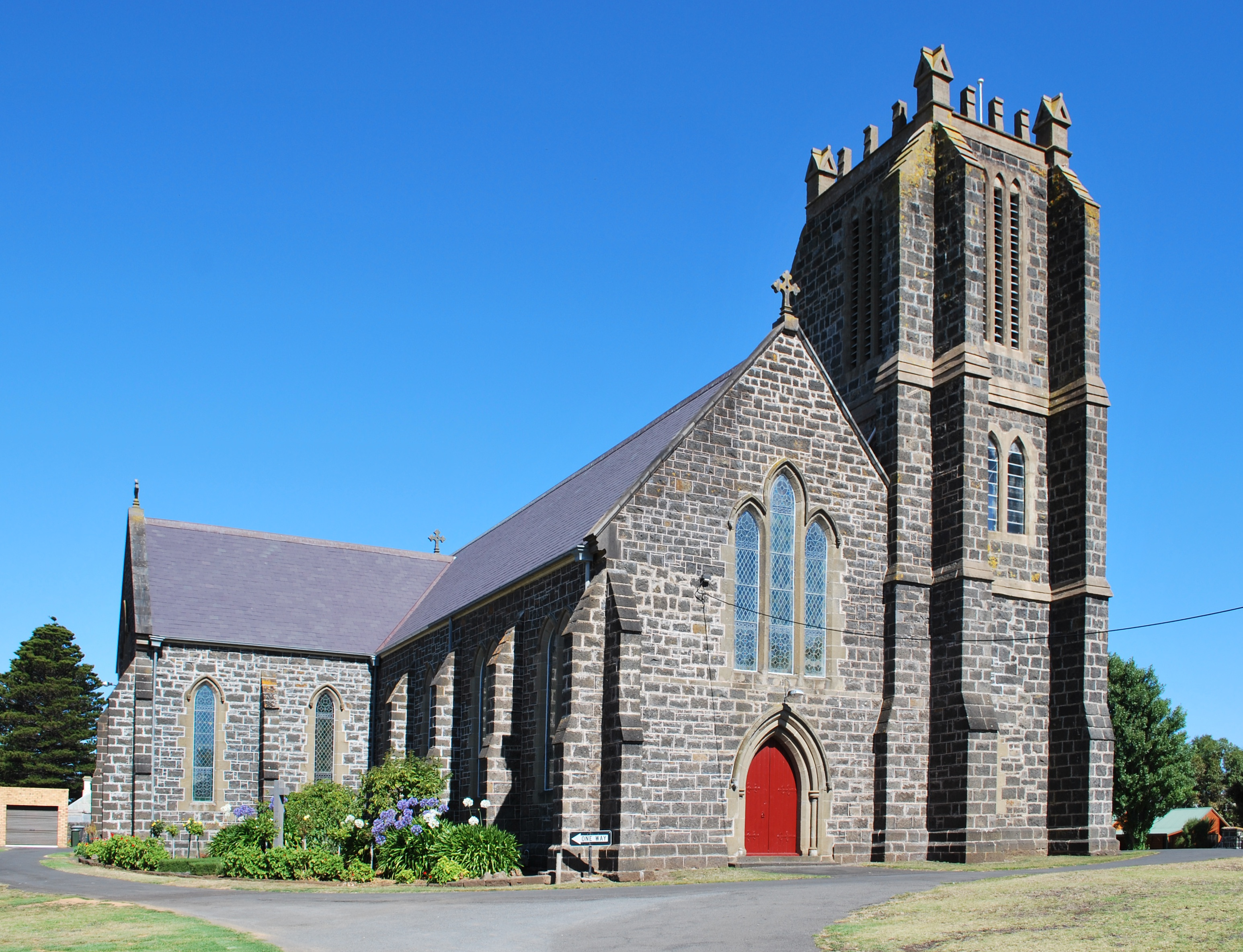
St John's Anglican Church, Port Fairy

== Heritage listing status ==
Style	Status
Yes	Listed on the Victorian Heritage Register
–	Not listed

== Current places of worship ==
Current places of worship
Name	Image	Location	Denomination/ Affiliation	Heritage listing	Notes	Refs
St Colman's Catholic Church		Mortlake; 38.079889°S 142.802296°E	Catholic	–		
St Andrew's Uniting Church, Mortlake		Mortlake; 38.078675°S 142.811180°E	Uniting (formerly Presbyterian)	Yes		
St James' Anglican Church, Mortlake		Mortlake; 38.078077°S 142.812303°E	Anglican	Yes		
Koroit Presbyterian Church		Koroit; 38.298577°S 142.369010°E	Presbyterian	–		
Catholic Church of the Infant Jesus, Koroit		Koroit; 38.300781°S 142.368829°E	Catholic	Yes		
St Paul's Anglican Church, Koroit		Koroit; 38.300938°S 142.371237°E	Anglican	–		
St John's Anglican Church, Port Fairy		Port Fairy; 38.381847°S 142.235970°E	Anglican	Yes		
St Patrick's Catholic Church, Port Fairy		Port Fairy; 38.385561°S 142.225125°E	Catholic	Yes		
Port Fairy Uniting Church		Port Fairy; 38.381778°S 142.234284°E	Uniting (formerly Wesleyan Methodist)	Yes		
Nullawarre Evangelical Reformed Church		Nullawarre; 38.468084°S 142.736541°E	Evangelical Reformed Church (originally Union Church, then Baptist)	–		
St Anne's Catholic Church		Purnim; 38.280869°S 142.616632°E	Catholic	–		
St Andrew's Uniting Church, Grassmere		Grassmere; 38.283892°S 142.524740°E	Uniting (formerly Presbyterian)	–		
Mepunga (East) Uniting Church		Mepunga East; 38.440228°S 142.700331°E	Uniting	–		
Wangoom Uniting Church		Wangoom; 38.328158°S 142.577914°E	Uniting (formerly Presbyterian)	–		
Macarthur Uniting Church		Macarthur; 38.033130°S 141.999482°E	Uniting (formerly Presbyterian)	–		
Immanuel Lutheran Church		Hawkesdale; 38.110772°S 142.322938°E	Lutheran	–		
St Andrew's Presbyterian Church, Port Fairy		Port Fairy; 38.383587°S 142.231064°E	Presbyterian	Yes		

== Former places of worship ==
Former places of worship
Name	Image	Location	Denomination/ Affiliation	Heritage listing	Notes	Refs
St Joseph's Catholic Church, Caramut		Caramut; 37.958076°S 142.513250°E	Catholic	–		
Chatsworth Presbyterian Church		Chatsworth; 37.859613°S 142.645561°E	Presbyterian	–		
St Paul's Anglican Church, Caramut		Caramut; 37.957015°S 142.518500°E	Anglican	–		
St Peter's Anglican Church, Hexham		Hexham; 37.993630°S 142.688548°E	Anglican	Non-existent		
St Andrew's Presbyterian Church, Hexham		Hexham; 37.994452°S 142.686633°E	Presbyterian	Yes		
St Stephen's Lutheran Church, Mortlake		Mortlake; 38.079246°S 142.812358°E	Lutheran (formerly Methodist)	Yes		
St David's Presbyterian Church, Hawkesdale		Hawkesdale; 38.107326°S 142.320356°E	Presbyterian	–		
St Joseph's Catholic Church, Hawkesdale		Hawkesdale; 38.107289°S 142.322955°E	Catholic	–		
St Malachy's Catholic Church		Macarthur; 38.031074°S 141.998973°E	Catholic	–		
Christ Church, Macarthur		Macarthur; 38.031920°S 141.999825°E	Anglican	–		
St John's Catholic Church		Orford; 38.202599°S 142.100958°E	Catholic	–		
St Andrew's Presbyterian Church, Woolsthorpe		Woolsthorpe; 38.180705°S 142.431900°E	Presbyterian	–		
Purnim Presbyterian Church		Purnim; 38.280101°S 142.618909°E	Presbyterian	–		
Garvoc Presbyterian Church		Garvoc; 38.298089°S 142.808097°E	Presbyterian	–		
Garvoc Catholic Church		Garvoc; 38.298757°S 142.814261°E	Catholic	–		
Panmure Anglican Church		Panmure; 38.333310°S 142.729676°E	Anglican	–		
Panmure Presbyterian Church		Panmure; 38.334027°S 142.729452°E	Presbyterian	–		
St Brendan's Catholic Church		Panmure; 38.339599°S 142.727041°E	Catholic	–		
Port Fairy Church of Christ		Port Fairy; 38.383536°S 142.231948°E	Church of Christ	–		
Rosebrook Presbyterian Church		Rosebrook; 38.353131°S 142.254779°E	Presbyterian	–		
Rosebrook Wesleyan Methodist Church		Rosebrook; 38.351185°S 142.257744°E	Wesleyan Methodist	–		
Nirranda Uniting Church		Nirranda; 38.500551°S 142.760348°E	Uniting (formerly Presbyterian)	Non-existent		
St Brigid's Catholic Church		Crossley; 38.319726°S 142.325667°E	Catholic	–		
St John's Uniting Church, Woorndoo		Woorndoo; 37.890694°S 142.798184°E	Uniting (formerly Presbyterian)	–		
Laang Uniting Church		Laang; 38.368400°S 142.806151°E	Uniting (formerly Presbyterian)	–		
St John's Catholic Church, Nirranda		Nirranda; 38.501045°S 142.763177°E	Catholic	–		
St Columba's Catholic Church, Winslow		Winslow; 38.242706°S 142.459533°E	Catholic	–		
St Joseph's Catholic Church, Yambuk		Yambuk; 38.315511°S 142.060827°E	Catholic	–		
St Peter's Anglican Church, Yambuk		Yambuk; 38.315936°S 142.061814°E	Anglican	–		

== See also ==
- List of places of worship in Golden Plains Shire
- List of places of worship in the City of Greater Geelong
