= Cyril Primmer =

Australian politician

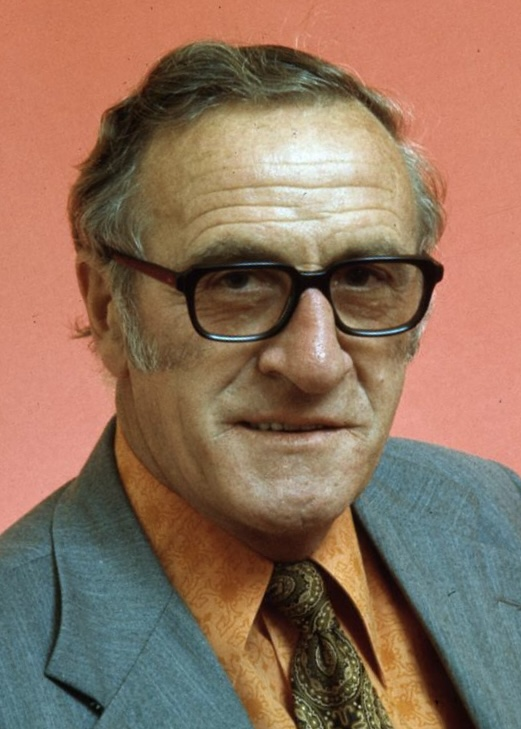
- Primmer in 1974

Senator for Victoria
- In office 1 July 1971 – 30 June 1985

Personal details
- Born: 19 April 1924 Warrnambool, Victoria, Australia
- Died: 1 November 2003 (aged 79) Warrnambool, Victoria, Australia
- Party: Australian Labor Party
- Occupation: Dairy farmer

Cyril Graham Primmer (19 April 1924 – 1 November 2003) was an Australian politician. Born in Warrnambool, Victoria, he was educated at state schools before becoming a dairy farmer at Koroit. He served in the military 1943–1945, and was a member of Belfast Shire Council. In 1970, he was elected to the Australian Senate as a Labor Senator for Victoria. He remained in the Senate until his retirement in 1985.

== Early life ==
Primmer was born on 19 April 1924 in Warrnambool, Victoria. He was the son of Annie Florence (née Duncan) and James Primmer; his father was a shearer.

Primmer spent his early years at Mailors Flat. When he was six years old his parents acquired a sheep and dairy farm at Kirkstall. He attended state schools in Kirkstall and Koroit, going on to attend Warrnambool Technical School for two years. Primmer was conscripted into the Citizen Military Forces in June 1942 and transferred to the Australian Imperial Force in August 1943. He saw active service on the New Guinea campaign as a cook with the Royal Australian Survey Corps. He was discharged with the rank of corporal in September 1946.

After the war's end, Primmer returned to his parents' farm at Kirkstall. He acquired his own nearby farming property of 102 acres (41 ha) in 1950. He was active in the local community, serving as president of the local Country Fire Authority brigade, president of the local Returned and Services League branch, and district secretary of the Victorian Dairy Farmers' Association.

== Politics ==
=== Early involvement ===
Primmer served on the Belfast Shire Council from 1956 to 1971 and was twice elected as shire president in 1958 and 1967.

Primmer joined the Australian Labor Party (ALP) around the time of the party split of 1955 and was president and secretary of the party's Kirkstall branch. He was an unsuccessful candidate for the Victorian Legislative Council at the 1961 state election, for the federal seat of Wannon at the 1963 and 1966 elections, and for the Senate at the 1967 election.

=== Senate ===
At the 1970 half-Senate election, Primmer was elected to a six-year term beginning on 1 July 1971, running in second position on the ALP's ticket in Victoria. His initial term was cut short by a double dissolution, but he was re-elected in 1974, 1975, 1980 and 1983. He did not seek re-election at the 1984 election, with his term expiring on 30 June 1985.

In the Senate, Primmer's primary interest was foreign affairs; he served on the Senate Standing Committee on Foreign Affairs and Defence for twelve years and was chair from 1974 to 1975 during the Whitlam government. He opposed Australian involvement in the Vietnam War and was active in the Vietnam Moratorium movement. In 1973 he described South Vietnamese leaders as "some of the greatest fascist despots that this world has seen".

Primmer was a leading opponent in Australia of the Indonesian invasion of East Timor, describing Indonesia's actions as "mass genocide". He opposed the Australian government's recognition of the annexation and was publicly critical of the role of the Department of Foreign Affairs and Australian ambassador Richard Woolcott. He helped establish a Senate subcommittee into East Timor, serving as deputy chairman and assisting with the subcommittee's report "condemning the Indonesian occupation of East Timor and detailing numerous abuses of human rights".

=== Lawsuits ===
Beginning in 1982, Primmer used parliamentary privilege to allege "criminal activity and cover-ups involving senior diplomats and officers" in the Department of Foreign Affairs, notably accusing Ivor Bowden, a former ambassador to Iran, of embezzlement. By May 1983 he had "placed more than ninety questions on notice" regarding his allegations. In December 1983, departmental secretary Peter Henderson sued Primmer for defamation. Henderson launched a further defamation suit in July 1984 after Primmer continued to repeat his allegations, and Bowden followed suit in August 1984.

Primmer's allegations were investigated by the Department of Finance, the Australian Federal Police (AFP), the Commonwealth Ombudsman, and the Public Service Board. In May 1983, foreign affairs minister Bill Hayden announced that two AFP investigations had found no evidence of criminality and describing Primmer's actions as "an inexcusable smudging of the character of the people" involved. Primmer ultimately settled the defamation suits in September 1986, "agreeing to pay damages and to issue formal letters of apology to Henderson and Bowden, withdrawing unreservedly all the accusations he had made against them".

In December 1983, Primmer used parliamentary privilege to make a series of allegations of misconduct against John Ryan, the director-general of the Australian Secret Intelligence Service (ASIS), as well as accusing Attorney-General Gareth Evans of misleading parliament. In response, Evans denied Primmer's allegations and accused him of misusing parliamentary privilege. The Canberra Times reported that Primmer had met with Hayden and Prime Minister Bob Hawke and was "spoken to severely about his remarks".

== Personal life ==
In 1947, Primmer married Lorna Floyd, with whom he had three children; he was divorced in 1988. After leaving politics he returned to farming. He died in Warrnambool on 1 November 2003, aged 79.
