= Crossley, Victoria =

Crossley Victoria
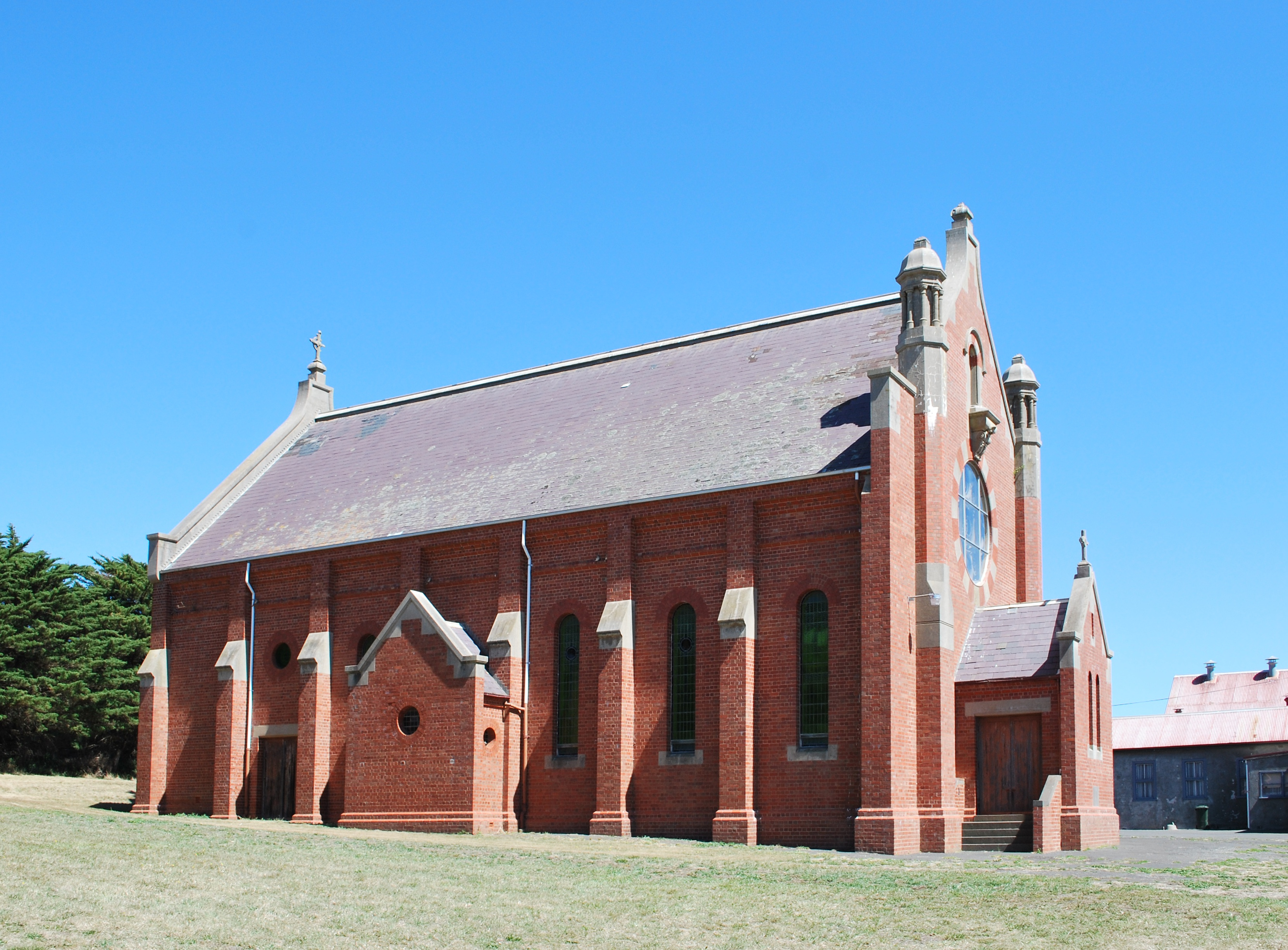
- St Brigid's Roman Catholic church at Crossley

- Coordinates: 38°19′11″S 142°19′30″E
- Population: 215 (2016 census)
- Postcode(s): 3283
- Location: 278 km (173 mi) W of Melbourne; 20 km (12 mi) W of Warrnambool; 5 km (3 mi) S of Koroit
- LGA(s): Shire of Moyne
- State electorate(s): South-West Coast
- Federal division(s): Wannon

Crossley is a locality in south west Victoria, Australia. The locality is in the Shire of Moyne, 278 kilometres (173 mi) west of the state capital, Melbourne.

At the 2016 census, Crossley had a population of 215.

== Traditional ownership ==
The formally recognised traditional owners for the area in which Crossley sits are the Eastern Maar people, who are represented by the Eastern Maar Aboriginal Corporation.
