= Cudgee =

Cudgee Victoria
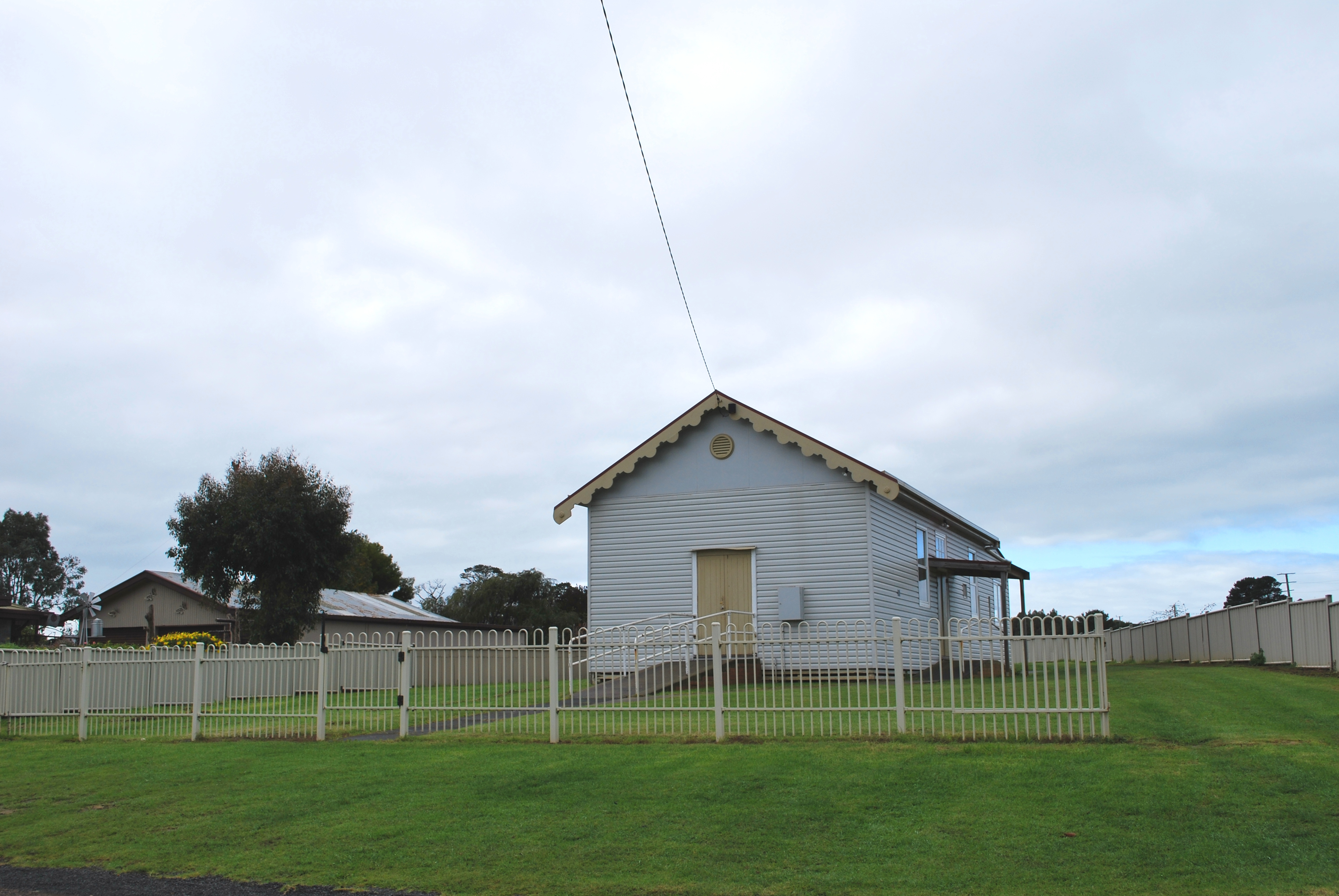
- Cudgee Hall, 2012

- Coordinates: 38°20′35″S 142°39′08″E
- Population: 238 (2016 census)
- Postcode(s): 3265
- Location: 241 km (150 mi) W of Melbourne; 18 km (11 mi) NE of Warrnambool
- LGA(s): Shire of Moyne
- State electorate(s): South-West Coast
- Federal division(s): Wannon

Cudgee is a locality in south west Victoria, Australia. The locality is in the Shire of Moyne, 241 kilometres (150 mi) west of the state capital, Melbourne.

At the 2016 census, Cudgee had a population of 238.

The formally recognised traditional owners for the area in which Cudgee sits are groups within the Eastern Maar peoples, who are represented by the Eastern Maar Aboriginal Corporation (EMAC).
