= Shire of Moyne =

Coordinates: 38°22′S 142°14′E

- Local government area
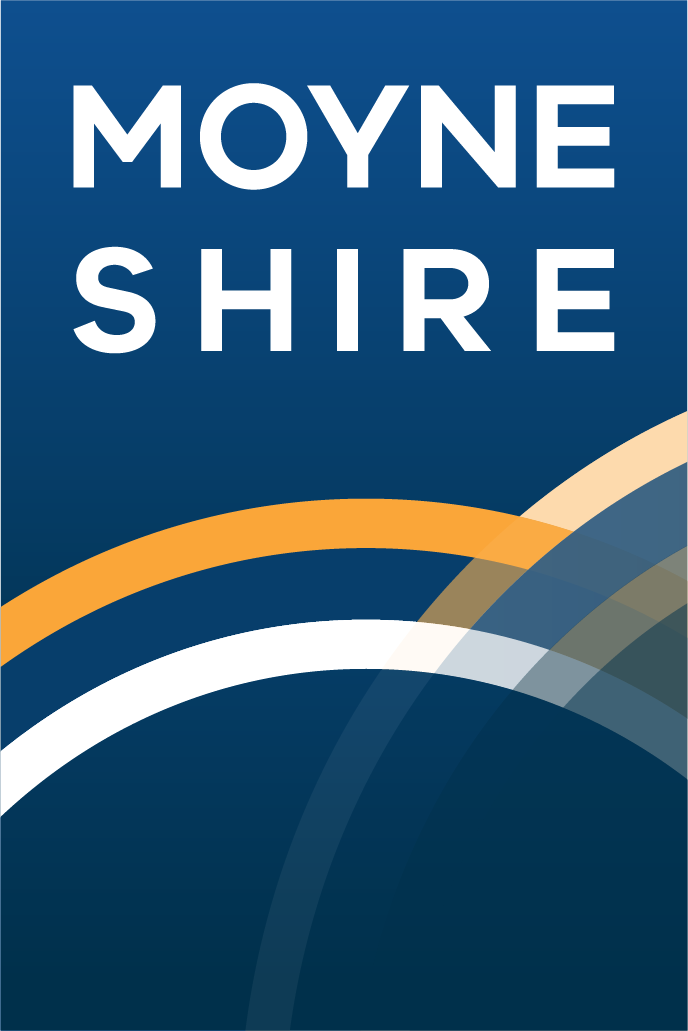
- Location in Victoria
- Interactive map of Shire of Moyne
- Country: Australia
- State: Victoria
- Region: Barwon South West
- Established: 1994
- Council seat: Port Fairy

Government
  - Mayor: Cr Jordan Lockett
  - State electorates: South-West Coast; Lowan
  - Federal division: Wannon

Area
  - Total: 5,481 km^{2} (2,116 sq mi)

Population
  - Total: 17,374 (2021)
  - Density: 3.1699/km^{2} (8.2099/sq mi)
- Gazetted: 23 September 1994
- Website: Shire of Moyne
LGAs around Shire of Moyne
Glenelg	Southern Grampians; Ararat	Corangamite
Glenelg	Shire of Moyne	Corangamite
Southern Ocean	Warrnambool	Southern Ocean

The Shire of Moyne is a local government area in the Barwon South West region of Victoria, Australia, located in the south-western part of the state. It covers an area of 5,481 square kilometres (2,116 mi^{2}) and at the 2021 census had a population of 17,374. It includes the towns of Port Fairy, Koroit, Mortlake, Macarthur, Peterborough and the rural districts of Caramut, Ellerslie, Framlingham, Garvoc, Hawkesdale, Kirkstall, Panmure, Mailors Flat, Purnim, Wangoom and Woolsthorpe. It also entirely surrounds the City of Warrnambool, a separate local government area.

The Shire is governed and administered by the Moyne Shire Council; its seat of local government and administrative centre is located at the council headquarters in Port Fairy. It also has a customer service centre in Mortlake and works depots in Koroit, Mortlake and Macarthur. The Shire is named after the Moyne River, a major geographical feature that meanders through the LGA.

The industry base for the area includes: dairy, beef cattle, sheep, vegetable production, seafood, other food products, pharmaceuticals, manufacturing, quarrying, and tourism.

== Traditional ownership ==
The formally recognised traditional owners for the area in which the Shire of Moyne sits are the Eastern Maar peoples and Gunditjmara people, who are represented by the Eastern Maar Aboriginal Corporation (EMAC) and the Gunditj Mirring Traditional Owners Aboriginal Corporation (GMTOAC).

== History ==
The Shire of Moyne was formed in 1994 from the amalgamation of the Shire of Belfast, Shire of Minhamite, Borough of Port Fairy, the vast bulk of the Shire of Mortlake and Shire of Warrnambool, as well as parts of the Shire of Dundas, Shire of Mount Rouse and Shire of Hampden.

The Local Government Board, tasked with drawing up new council boundaries in Victoria's south-west in 1994, observed that the Moyne sub-area was "the most difficult for [it] to consider", thanks in part to "seemingly irreconcilable tensions between urban and rural interests". The Board first determined to amalgamate the largely agricultural Shires of Minhamite, Belfast, Mortlake and Warrnambool. Merger with the City of Warrnambool was considered next, but rejected, as it was felt that the city's urban economic interests were sufficiently detached from those of its rural hinterland that the city was strong enough to stand alone. Numerous submissions requested the same treatment for Port Fairy; options explored by the Board included maintaining the Borough of Port Fairy (rejected out of hand), a "coastal strip" municipality stretching from Port Fairy to Warrnambool, or amalgamation of the City of Warrnambool and Borough of Port Fairy into a single, non-contiguous municipality. In the end, the Board considered that Port Fairy belonged in Moyne, because Port Fairy had strong links to its rural hinterland in its role as a service town; Port Fairy's tourism sector was heritage-focused, unlike Warrnambool's; and the special challenges of managing the coastal–farmland interface between the two settlements were best dealt with by a rural-focused shire.

At public meetings held in the respective towns, Caramut and Macarthur residents strongly favoured being included in Moyne in preference to the proposed Shire of Southern Grampians. By contrast, the meeting at Peterborough, located at the extreme south-eastern tip of the Shire of Warrnambool, was split on the question of whether the town should join the Shire of Corangamite. In the absence of a strong argument either way, the Board declined to alter the established boundary.

In January 1996, after a further Local Government Board review, about 370 km^{2} of farmland in the Lake Bolac and Nerrin Nerrin districts was transferred from Moyne to the Rural City of Ararat. At the same time, Moyne gained about 40 km^{2} near Chatsworth from the Shire of Southern Grampians.

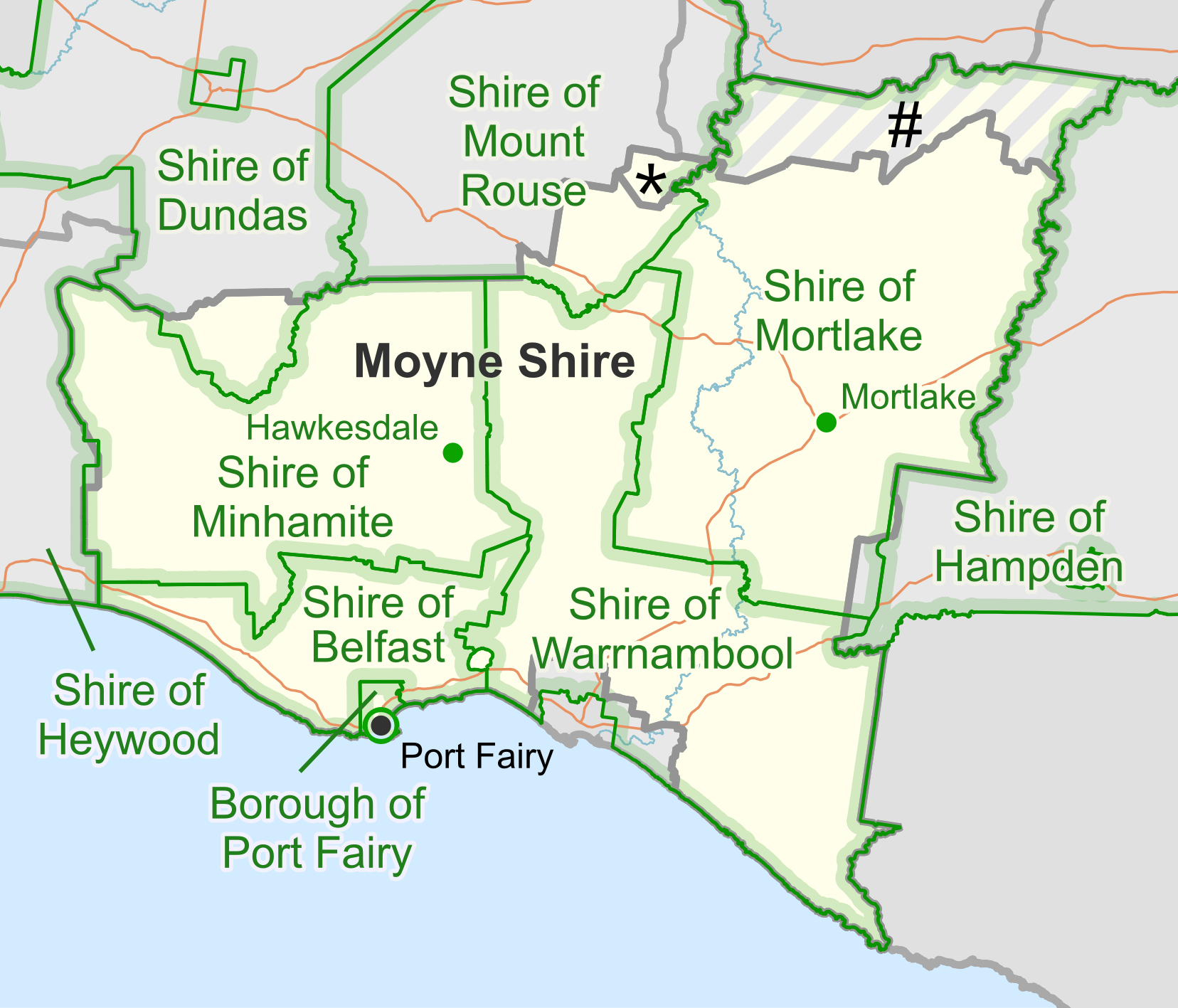
Moyne Shire's predecessor LGAs (green) as they were in 1994. The administrative centres of the former LGAs are marked by green dots. 🞲 Area gained from Southern Grampians Shire in 1996 # Area lost to the Rural City of Ararat in 1996

== Council ==
=== Current composition ===
The council is composed of seven councillors elected to represent an unsubdivided municipality.

Councillor
Jordan Lockett	Mayor
Myra Murrihy	Deputy Mayor
Jim Doukas	
Lisa Ryan	
Susan Taylor	
Lloyd Ross	
Karen Foster	

=== Administration and governance ===
The council meets in the council chambers at the Mortlake Municipal Office. Administrative activities are conducted at both the Port Fairy and Mortlake offices, which also provide customer services centres.

== Townships and localities ==
The 2021 census recorded the shire population at 17,374, up from 16,495 in the 2016 census.

Population
Locality	2016	2021
Allansford^	1,521	1,410
Ayrford^	44	39
Ballangeich	64	71
Bessiebelle^	98	113
Breakaway Creek^	50	39
Broadwater	92	75
Brucknell^	116	127
Bushfield^	571	596
Byaduk^	123	129
Caramut^	246	256
Chatsworth^	44	49
Codrington	52	37
Condah Swamp	*	#
Crossley	215	235
Cudgee	238	311
Curdievale^	124	125
Darlington^	107	84
Dennington^	1,907	1,994
Dundonnell	46	52
Ecklin South^	188	222
Ellerslie	147	157
Framlingham	158	169
Framlingham East	21	25
Garvoc^	243	248
Gazette^	43	42
Gerrigerrup	33	31
Glenormiston North^	56	63
Grassmere	402	385
Hawkesdale	322	311
Hexham	143	130
Illowa^	304	304
Killarney	205	195
Kirkstall	366	406
Knebsworth	9	22
Kolora^	142	188
Koroit	2,055	2,184
Laang	100	115
Lake Condah^	6	9
Macarthur	522	469
Mailors Flat	425	490
Mepunga	47	36
Mepunga East	67	73
Mepunga West	76	83
Minhamite	113	106
Minjah	58	65
Mortlake	1,372	1,477
Nareeb^	36	48
Naringal	120	124
Naringal East	93	96
Nerrin Nerrin^	38	48
Nirranda	56	50
Nirranda East^	14	12
Nirranda South	76	90
Noorat^	333	318
Nullawarre	267	233
Nullawarre North	61	46
Orford	105	115
Panmure	424	442
Penshurst^	622	677
Peterborough^	247	322
Port Fairy	3,340	3,742
Pura Pura^	37	47
Purdeet^	14	21
Purnim	270	292
Purnim West	37	50
Rosebrook	132	128
Southern Cross	117	128
St Helens	47	34
Taroon^	22	25
Tarrone	64	69
Terang^	2,288	2,254
The Cove	10	18
The Sisters	141	110
Toolong	91	88
Tower Hill	81	83
Tyrendarra^	212	198
Tyrendarra East	27	19
Wallacedale^	113	94
Wangoom	226	237
Warrabkook	34	42
Warrnambool^	29,661	31,308
Warrong	72	77
Willatook	55	53
Winslow	368	436
Woodford^	361	436
Woolsthorpe	422	364
Woorndoo^	169	160
Yambuk	267	284
Yangery^	111	113
Yarpturk	77	63

^ - Territory divided with another LGA
* - Not noted in 2016 Census
# - Not noted in 2021 Census

== See also ==
- List of places of worship in Moyne Shire
- List of localities in Victoria
