= Hexham, Victoria =

Hexham
- Town
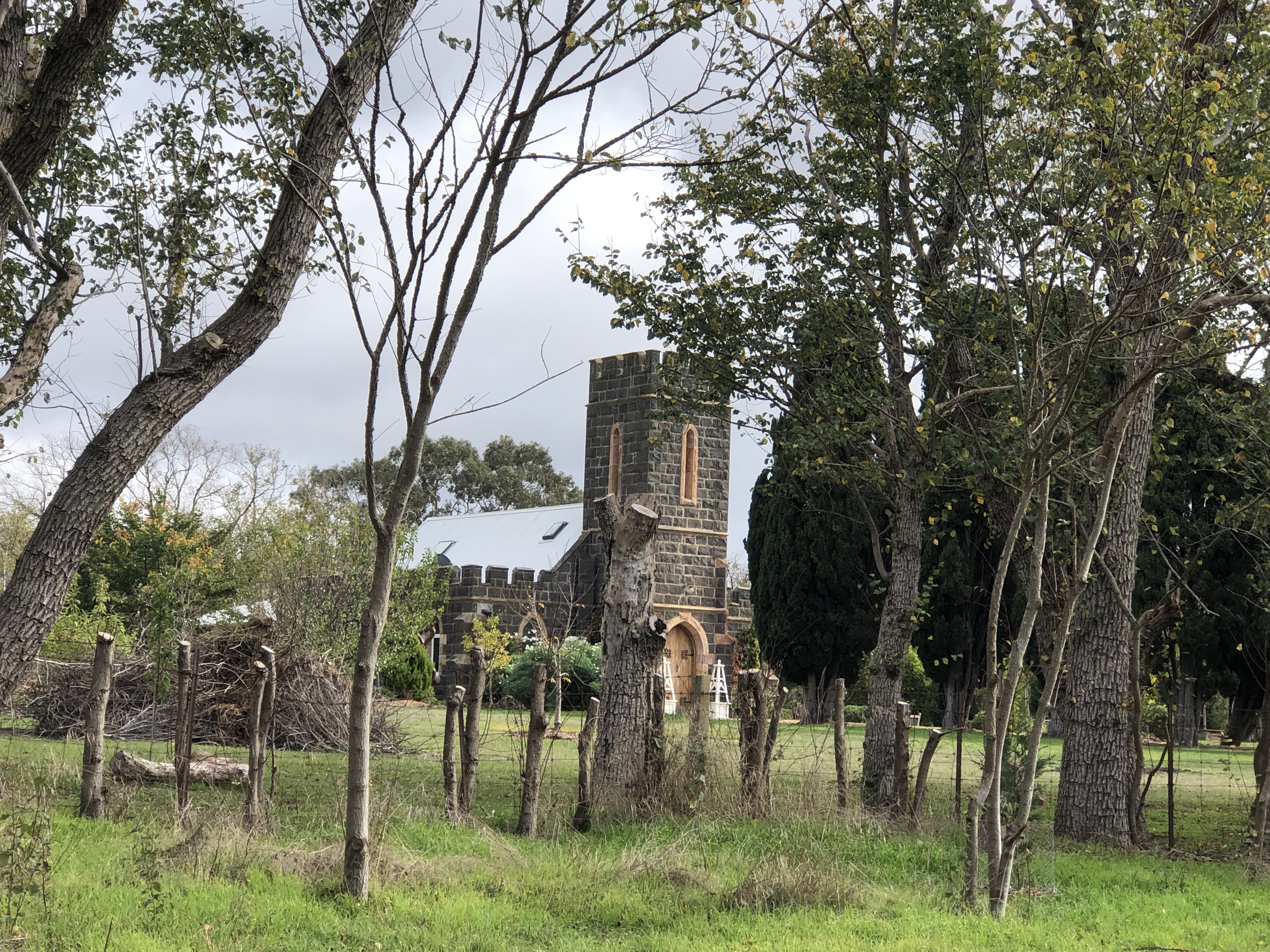
- The former St Andrew's Presbyterian Church, Hexham

- Coordinates: 38°0′0″S 142°41′0″E
- Country: Australia
- State: Victoria
- LGA: Shire of Moyne
- Location: 250 km (160 mi) WSW of Melbourne; 17 km (11 mi) SE of Caramut; 16 km (9.9 mi) NW of Mortlake

Government
  - State electorate: Polwarth
  - Federal division: Wannon

Population
  - Total: 143 (2016 census)
- Postcode: 3273

Hexham /ˈhɛksəm/ is a town in Victoria, Australia.

The town is on the Hamilton Highway between Caramut and Mortlake. It sits on the banks of the Hopkins River, Hexham is said to be Victoria's second oldest inland settlement, after Harrow. The town was a Cobb & Co staging point for all mail from Hamilton via Caramut, Penshurst and Tarrington and passenger stopover on the route between Geelong and Port Fairy.

The hotel was once a regular stop over for miners on their way to the goldfields.

The town used to have a football team that played in the Mt Noorat Football League but it folded in 1984.

The town is located 250 kilometres (155 mi) west of the state capital, Melbourne, on the Hamilton Highway between Hamilton and Mortlake.

== Traditional ownership ==
The formally recognised traditional owners for the area in which Hexham sits are the Eastern Maar People who are represented by the Eastern Maar Aboriginal Corporation.

The Indigenous language spoken in the area is Djab Wurrung. Aboriginal Australian leaders Collin and Nora Hood lived in Hexham in the mid-19th-century.
