= Australian Dodgeball League =

Australian Dodgeball Championships
- Sport: Dodgeball
- Founded: 2015
- Organising body: Australian Dodgeball Federation
- Country: Australia
- Most recent champions: Darkwood Immortals (Foam Mixed), Oakleigh Orcas (Foam Men's), Sapphire Sirens (Foam Women's) & Skye Rainbows (Cloth Mixed).
- Tournament format: Foam Men's, Women's & Mixed, Cloth Men's, Women's & Mixed
- Website: https://www.dodgeballaustralia.org.au/nationals

The Australian Dodgeball Championships (ADC) is an elite level annual dodgeball championship in Australia, founded in 2015. Qualifying teams from each state league attend the championship, the foremost of these being the Victorian Dodgeball League, the South Australian Dodgeball League, and the New South Wales Dodgeball League. These state leagues, as well as recognised teams from other developing states, come together at the end of each season, with the top three teams qualifying across the Foam and Cloth formats, and the Men's, Women's, and Mixed categories.

== ADL Professional League ==
=== Formation ===
The Australian Dodgeball Championships were formed in 2015. The league is currently played across two states, Victoria (VDL) and New South Wales (NSWDL). The opening season of the Victorian League features 23 teams that played in the regular league, and the New South Wales League had 8 entrants.

=== Venues ===
Australian Dodgeball Championships are held in central venues, where the game day matches are played, rather than the traditional home and away venues that other sports may operate with. The Victoria Dodgeball League holds game days at the Melbourne State Netball & Hockey Centre, and the New South Wales League holds game days at the Fairfield Youth & Community Centre.

=== Regular season ===
During a season, each club plays every other club once. Teams receive two points for a win and one point for a draw. No points are awarded for a loss. Teams are ranked by total points, then point difference. The top two teams from each state level competition then proceed to the Australian Dodgeball Championships, where the top teams from across Australia play-off in an elimination format for the title of Australian Dodgeball Champions.

=== Championship rounds ===
Once the regular season has been played across the states and the competitive tables have been finalised, the top two teams from each state league enter the championship rounds. The top team from each league enters as the first seed and plays against the bracketed second seed.

The Round of 16 is the opening round of the championship competition, with state seeding set between states with close proximity. Once the Round of 16 is over, states can play against teams from their own competition, depending on results.

=== Rules ===
The Australian Dodgeball Championships have created their own National Dodgeball League rules for professional dodgeball competition.

=== Victorian dominance ===
Due to the size and scope of dodgeball in Australia, the early seasons of the Australian Dodgeball Championships were focused on Victoria and, to a lesser extent, New South Wales. This dominance, and the ability to draw on talent for all the teams due to the interest and investment in the sport, meant that Victorian champions were often the favourites for the Championship titles, and those that followed the Victorian leagues developed a rivalry with the biggest challenger for their titles, the New South Wales clubs.

This dominance is in the process of waning; however, Victorian teams are still counted among the most dominant in the country, and as more teams are founded and develop, the influence of Victorians on the sport may come to lessen in the coming years.

=== State rivalries ===
Much like Australian state rivalries in rugby league and cricket, Victoria and New South Wales developed a grudge with each other, often focused around their meetings outside of the season, and in the Championship Rounds. Although movements between the leagues were common, games between Victorians and New South Welshmen developed a stigma as close, tight-fought matches.

Between the organizers of the two state leagues, the VDL and the NSWDL, there are current talks to hold a competition similar to rugby league's State of Origin series, where Victoria and New South Wales will put forward their best ten players each to compete in a Best of 3 series to determine the more dominant state.

== Teams ==
Team	City	Founded	Website
Victorian Dodgeball League
Balaclava Renegades	Balaclava, VIC	2015	Renegades Official Team Website
Black Rock Bandits	Black Rock, VIC	2015	Bandits Official Team Website
Brunswick Beavers	Brunswick, VIC	2015	Beavers Official Team Site
Bundoora Pirates	Bundoora, VIC	2015	Pirates Official Team Site
Cranbourne Cowboys	Cranbourne, VIC	2015	Cowboys Official Team Site
Doncaster Demons	Doncaster, VIC	2015	Demons Official Team Site
Eltham Spartans	Eltham, VIC	2015	Spartans Official Team Site
Footscray Flames	Footscray, VIC	2015	Flames Official Team Site
Geelong Wolfpack	Geelong, VIC	2015	Wolfpack Official Team Site
Gippsland McGators	Gippsland, VIC	2015	McGators Official Team Site
Glen Waverley Gorillas	Glen Waverley, VIC	2015	Gorillas Official Team Site
Glenroy Golden Cocks	Glenroy, VIC	2015	Golden Cocks Official Team Site
Macleod Highlanders	Macleod, VIC	2015	Highlanders Official Team Site
Melbourne Dodgers	Melbourne, VIC	2015	Dodgers Official Team Site
Northcote Ninjas	Northcote, VIC	2015	Ninjas Official Team Site
Parkville Phoenix	Parkville, VIC	2015	Phoenix Official Team Site
Ravenhall Vikings	Ravenhall, VIC	2015	Vikings Official Team Site
Rowville Reapers	Rowville, VIC	2015	Reapers Official Team Site
Southern Cross Sandvipers	Southern Cross, VIC	2015	Sandvipers Official Team Site
Sunbury Strikers	Sunbury, VIC	2015	Strikers Official Team Site
Sunshine Kiwis	Sunshine, VIC	2015	Kiwis Official Team Site
Torquary Sharks	Torquary, VIC	2015	Sharks Official Team Site
Warrnambool Sea Monsters	Warnnambool, VIC	2015	Sea Monsters Official Team Site
New South Wales Dodgeball League
Burwood Badgers	Burwood, NSW	2016	Badgers Official Team Site
Concord Coyotes	Concord, NSW	2016	Coyotes Official Team Site
Campbelltown Crushers	Campbelltown, NSW	2016	Crushers Official Team Site
Liverpool Lightning	Liverpool, NSW	2016	Lightning Official Team Site
Milperra Mavericks	Milperra, NSW	2016	Mavericks Official Team Site
Newcastle Waves	Newcastle, NSW	2016	Waves Official Team Site
Parramatta Pirates	Parramatta, NSW	2016	Parramatta Official Team Site
Strathfield Stompers	Strathfield, NSW	2016	Stompers Official Team Site
