= Jim Doolan (footballer) =

Australian rules footballer

Personal information
- Full name: James Francis Doolan
- Born: 8 October 1888; Kirkstall, Victoria
- Died: 8 October 1944 (aged 56); Caulfield, Victoria
- Original team: Noorat

Playing career^{1}
Years	Club	Games (Goals)
1912–13	St Kilda	13 (2)
- ^{1} Playing statistics correct to the end of 1913.

James Francis Doolan (8 October 1888 – 8 October 1944) was an Australian rules footballer who played with St Kilda in the Victorian Football League (VFL).
