= Purnim =

Purnim Victoria
- Coordinates: 38°16′30″S 142°37′30″E
- Population: 459 (2006 census)
- Postcode(s): 3278
- Location: 250 km (155 mi) WSW of Melbourne; 20 km (12 mi) NE of Warrnambool; 31 km (19 mi) SW of Mortlake
- LGA(s): Shire of Moyne
- State electorate(s): South West Coast
- Federal division(s): Wannon

Purnim /ˈpɜːrnɪm/ is a town in Victoria, Australia. The town is located 250 kilometres (155 mi) south west of the state capital, Melbourne, on the Hopkins Highway midway between Warrnambool and Mortlake. At the 2006 census, Purnim and the surrounding area had a population of 459.

Purnim Post Office opened on 1 November 1868.

Buildings of interest are the Purnim Hotel, Purnim Mechanics Institute hall (built in 1901), the Australian rules football oval, the primary school, and a church.

Purnim has a cricket team that formerly competed in Grassmere Cricket Association, but changed its name to the Northern Raiders and now competes in the Warrnambool District Cricket Association.

== Traditional ownership ==
The formally recognised traditional owners for the area in which Purnim sits are the Eastern Maar people, who are represented by the Eastern Maar Aboriginal Corporation (EMAC).
