= Mortlake, Victoria =

Mortlake
- Town
- Mortlake Flour Mill (built 1856)

- Coordinates: 38°04′S 142°48′E
- Country: Australia
- State: Victoria
- LGA: Shire of Moyne
- Location: 234 km (145 mi) W of Melbourne; 50 km (31 mi) NE of Warrnambool; 25 km (16 mi) NW of Terang
- Established: 1853

Government
  - State electorate: Lowan
  - Federal division: Wannon

Population
  - Total: 1,372 (2016 census)
- Postcode: 3272

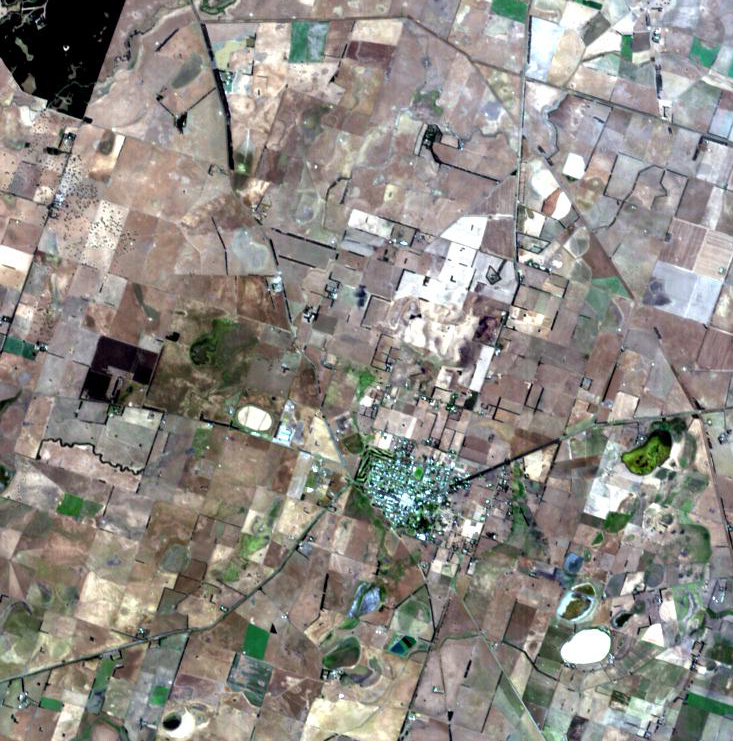
Satellite image of Mortlake on 3 January 2018.

Mortlake is a town in the Western District of Victoria, Australia on the Hamilton Highway, 50 kilometres (31 mi) north-east of Warrnambool. It is in the Shire of Moyne local government area and the federal Division of Wannon. As per the 2001 census, Mortlake had a population of 941, which rose to 996 in 2006, and to 1,073 in 2011.

Mortlake is situated at the foot of an extinct volcano, Mount Shadwell, formed around 359,000 years ago. Self-proclaimed as the olivine capital of Australia, large ejected rocks from Mt Shadwell are called volcanic bombs. They are often egg shaped because they cooled as they were being thrown through the air. These bombs can contain olivine, a green crystal also known as peridot, the birthstone for August. The town is also known for its bluestone buildings, with several fine examples dating back to the 1850s visible from the Hamilton Highway.

== History ==
Various groups of Aboriginal Victorians lived in the area before European colonisation and settlement. The area was inhabited by Kirrae, Djab wurrung and Gunditjmara people, who built homes in small villages, sometimes using stones in their construction, and lived a settled life.

The Mortlake area was probably first surveyed by Major Thomas Livingston Mitchell when he passed through the area in 1836–37. The town is based at the foot of a mount, as are many towns across the volcanic plains. The mount, Mount Shadwell, was named after his friend Major Thomas Henry Shadwell Clerke, and the nearby Hopkins River was named after Major John Paul Hopkins. The first white settlers to arrive in Mortlake were probably David Fisher and his party in 1839, who set up a station which was left under the charge of Thomas Anderson.

An influx of settlers initially attracted to the 1850s Victorian gold rush but after their lack of success, they headed for the rich volcanic soil around Mt Shadwell. Establishment of Mortlake as a settlement occurred in the 1850s and 1860s. The town was formally surveyed in 1853. The Post Office opened 2 February 1859.

Many of the original bluestone buildings include those in the Shaw Street Bluestone Precinct, such as the former Mortlake courthouse and the former shire offices. The historic Mill (now privately owned) is located in Mill Street.

In the late 1870s, an area of swamp was drained and established as the Mortlake Botanical Gardens, which at its height covered nearly 50 acres (20 ha). As a present to the township in 1988 (Australia's Bicentennial) a new lake was constructed by the State Government. This lake is now known as Tea Tree Lake.

Soldiers returning from The Great War were also offered the chance to become farmers. Under the Discharged Soldiers' Settlement Act 1917 they were offered land selections on reasonable terms. The War Service Homes Commission was established in 1919 to provide houses for successful "soldier settler" applicants and their dependants. The simple weatherboard cottages they erected, however, proved far from adequate.

At Mortlake the Government’s Board purchased large areas of the Lionel Weatherly’s Woolongoon estate. 39 farms were laid out at Woolongoon. Dairy farming would provide a successful livelihood for soldier settlers. In 1918, in popular opinion this area was regarded as "an agricultural Utopia" due to the high rainfall and good soil in most of the parts and the ability of local farmers to make a livelihood on a small acreage. The Woolongoon estate at Mortlake proved to be highly successful.

After WWII another soldier settlement scheme was established in Mortlake. The former Mortlake Shire had the highest number of soldier settlers in Australia. There were 248 holdings from nearly 64,000 h (230,000 ks) on 29 estates, but there were more soldier settlers around Caramut, Hexham and Darlington.

Population in Mortlake peaked with the end of the baby boomers and the start of the Generation X. A series of droughts and the inevitable process of the young moving to more urban areas for education and work, lend to a change in demographics. Deregulation of state government laws put more pressure on small businesses from competition from larger firms in the city. Farm labour became more mechanised. Eventually the population began to shrink. Smaller population meant less demand for services, which reduced the need for employment.

A Mortlake railway line connected Mortlake with Terang from 1890 until 1977.

Mortlake Magistrates' Court closed on 1 January 1983.

Real estate prices collapsed when the Kennett government decreed that all towns over 500 people needed to be connected to the town sewage supply. The cost of connecting to the sewage was more that what the house was worth.

The Avenue of Honour situated on the eastern approach to Mortlake along the Hamilton Highway is a 2.2 km long avenue features 192 Monterey Cypress Trees. Originally planted of Arbor Day 1920 the Avenue of Honour was extended after the Second World War, giving rise to the misconception that the Avenue of Honour commemorates veterans of both World Wars. Of the 192 trees, 152 commemorate World War One veterans who resided within the former Shire of Mortlake before enlistment. The remaining 40 trees are not dedicated.

Due to the neglect, ageing and the effects of Cypress Canker the Moyne Shire Council announced in 2021 that due to public safety, the remaining trees would be removed and replaced with holm oaks over a four-year period. The selection of holm oaks as the replacement tree brought to a close a decade of intense debate over the future of the Avenue of Honour. While the current plan is to replace the existing trees with holm oaks, an alternative plan proposed by local veterans involves extending the length of the Avenue of Honour to allow veterans of all conflicts that local men and women have participated in to be commemorated with an oak tree. This would create one of the few Avenue of Honours in Australia to honour veterans of all conflicts and the second longest Avenue of Honour in Victoria.

== Traditional ownership ==
The formally recognised traditional owners for the area in which Mortlake sits are the Eastern Maar group of Aboriginal people, who are represented by the Eastern Maar Aboriginal Corporation.

== Education ==
There are two schools in Mortlake, both co-educational. The largest school is the government school Mortlake P-12 College, with approximately 200 students ranging from Prep to Year 12. There is also a Catholic primary school, St. Colmans, with around 30 students. There is also a Kindergarten.

Mortlake is located between two major agricultural districts: Hamilton to the north-west for the wool industry, and to the south-east, the dairy industry. Farms in the area exploit the rich volcanic soil for both farming practices.

== Industry ==
One of the town's most famous industries, Clarke's Pies, which made pies for distribution all over Victoria, announced in January 2007 that the company had been sold to Patties Foods and that production would cease in early March 2007, leaving around 50 people out of work. Clarke's regularly featured in the top 10% of pie-makers in Australia. As of April 2007, Clarke's have begun producing the original square pie, on a smaller scale, and delivering within the local area. In 2008 it was announced that an export boning room would commence production mid-year in the premises of the old Clarke's Pies factory. It was planned to employ up to 100 employees with specialised skills.

On 4 July 2008, the Origin Energy Board announced it would construct a $640 million 550 megaWatt (MW) gas-fired power station located 12 km west of Mortlake. The power station is being constructed on approximately 20 hectares of land with an extensive buffer zone around it. Although approvals have been gained for approximately 1,000 MW, the Mortlake Power Station will be built in two stages adjacent to the existing Moorabool to Heywood 500 kV high voltage transmission line. The plant will be supplied with natural gas via an 83 km dedicated underground natural gas transmission pipeline from the new gas processing plant being built near Port Campbell, as part of the offshore Otway Gas Project.

During construction up to 400 jobs will be created and when finished it is anticipated that about 30 employees will run and maintain the station. The power station was completed in 2012.

In 2017 construction of the Mortlake windfarm consisting of 51 AW1500 1.5MW turbines is set to commence. The A$200m project will generate significant economic activity in the Moyne Shire and surrounds- including over 80–100 construction jobs and 5–10 full time operational positions.

By the end of 2017 the new Mortlake Saleyards are scheduled to have been constructed. The $15 million project is expected to handle the sale of 200,000–250,000 cattle per year.

== Events and culture ==
Mortlake has a range of community, service and sporting groups and activities. There are Rotary, Lions, Apex, RSL, CWA, Red Cross, Freemasons and Probus clubs, as well as the Mortlake & District Historical Society, the Gardening Club, with its annual rose show, and the Mortlake Visual Arts Group who host the annual Mortlake art show in June (www.mortlakeartshow.com.au). Sporting clubs include bowls, swimming, tennis, squash and badminton, as well as a skate park. Young people can also join the Moyne Shire Youth Council to promote youth and community activities. The students and staff at Mortlake P-12 College run a yearly drama production and in previous years they have produced 'Grease', 'Cats', 'Les Misérables', 'Oklahoma', 'Pirates of Penzance' and 'Beauty and the Beast'.

Mortlake also fields two Australian rules football teams – the Terang-Mortlake Football Club in the Hampden Football Netball League and the Woorndoo-Mortlake Football Club in the Mininera & District Football League and Netball Association. Lewis Taylor, winner of the 2014 AFL Rising Star award is from Mortlake.

Mortlake originally fielded the Mortlake Football Club, who went into recess and merged with Derrinallum for the 1999 season to become the Western Lions in the Hampden league. The Western Lions went into recess in 2000. The original Mortlake Football Club then amalgamated with the Terang Football Club in the Hampden Football Netball League and the Woorndoo Football Club in the Mininera & District Football League in 2001, to field two separate teams.

Mortlake has both football and cricket facilities at the D.C. Farren Oval, which also contains 10 courts for netball and tennis.

Mortlake has a horse racing club, the Mortlake Racing Club, which schedules one race meeting a year, the Mortlake Cup meeting held on Victoria Derby day.

Golfers play at the course of the Mortlake Golf Club on Hopetoun Street.

== Famous residents ==
- Ted Absolom - Collingwood footballer and Boer War soldier
- Ray Anderson - South Melbourne footballer
- Marji Armstrong - equestrian
- Joan Chambers - Victorian state politician
- William Ronald Cumming - grazier, soldier, Victorian politician, Croix de guerre recipient
- Leon Harris - Fitzroy footballer
- Russel Howcroft - media personality
- Kate McLennan - comedian, writer and actor
- Luke Rounds - Collingwood footballer
- Mary Turner Shaw - pioneering architect
- Lewis Taylor - Brisbane Bears, winner of the 2014 AFL Rising Star
- Walter West - Victorian state politician
- Georgia Wareham - Australian women's Test cricketer

== Climate ==
Climate data for Mortlake, Victoria (1991–2020 normals, extremes 1994–present)
Month	Jan	Feb	Mar	Apr	May	Jun	Jul	Aug	Sep	Oct	Nov	Dec	Year
Record high °C (°F)	44.9 (112.8)	46.0 (114.8)	41.1 (106.0)	36.9 (98.4)	27.9 (82.2)	23.2 (73.8)	19.1 (66.4)	23.4 (74.1)	28.4 (83.1)	35.8 (96.4)	38.3 (100.9)	44.0 (111.2)	46.0 (114.8)
Mean daily maximum °C (°F)	26.3 (79.3)	26.4 (79.5)	24.1 (75.4)	20.1 (68.2)	16.2 (61.2)	13.6 (56.5)	13.0 (55.4)	13.9 (57.0)	15.8 (60.4)	18.2 (64.8)	21.0 (69.8)	23.6 (74.5)	19.3 (66.7)
Mean daily minimum °C (°F)	10.9 (51.6)	11.6 (52.9)	10.0 (50.0)	7.9 (46.2)	6.7 (44.1)	4.9 (40.8)	4.5 (40.1)	4.7 (40.5)	5.6 (42.1)	6.4 (43.5)	8.1 (46.6)	9.3 (48.7)	7.6 (45.7)
Record low °C (°F)	1.1 (34.0)	2.0 (35.6)	−1.3 (29.7)	−2.5 (27.5)	−2.9 (26.8)	−5.0 (23.0)	−5.3 (22.5)	−4.4 (24.1)	−3.0 (26.6)	−3.9 (25.0)	−1.4 (29.5)	−0.6 (30.9)	−5.3 (22.5)
Average rainfall mm (inches)	32.9 (1.30)	33.1 (1.30)	31.5 (1.24)	44.2 (1.74)	58.1 (2.29)	52.2 (2.06)	62.2 (2.45)	66.6 (2.62)	58.1 (2.29)	51.8 (2.04)	49.1 (1.93)	40.3 (1.59)	581.6 (22.90)
Average rainy days (≥ 1.0 mm)	4.2	3.8	5.6	6.9	9.7	9.7	12.2	12.8	11.0	9.1	6.7	6.3	98.0
Source: Australian Bureau of Meteorology
