= Ecklin South =

- Town
- Coordinates: 38.3935°S 142.9100°E
- Country: Australia
- State: Victoria
- LGAs: Corangamite Shire; Shire of Moyne

Government
  - State electorate: Polwarth
  - Federal division: Wannon

Population
  - Total: 222 (SAL 2021)
- Postcode: 3265

Ecklin South is a locality in the Western District of Victoria, Australia. It is located mostly in the Shire of Corangamite with a small portion in the Shire of Moyne.

== History ==
The first school in Ecklin South opened 1868. The town's schools were closed in 1992.

The Ecklin South post office opened on 5 June 1902 and closed on 30 September 1969.

== Traditional ownership ==
The formally recognised traditional owners for the area in which Ecklin South sits are the Eastern Maar People who are represented by the Eastern Maar Aboriginal Corporation.
