= Ayrford =

- Town
- Coordinates: 38.4301°S 142.8569°E
- Country: Australia
- State: Victoria
- LGAs: Shire of Moyne; Corangamite Shire

Government
  - State electorate: Polwarth
  - Federal division: Wannon

Population
  - Total: 39 (SAL 2021)
- Postcode: 3265

Ayrford is a locality in the Barwon South West region of Victoria, Australia. It is located between the Shire of Corangamite and the Shire of Moyne.

== History ==
The Ayrford post office opened on 1 March 1945 and closed on 20 June 1967.

== Traditional ownership ==
The formally recognised traditional owners for the area in which Ayrford sits are the Eastern Maar People who are represented by the Eastern Maar Aboriginal Corporation.
