= Mepunga =

Mepunga Victoria
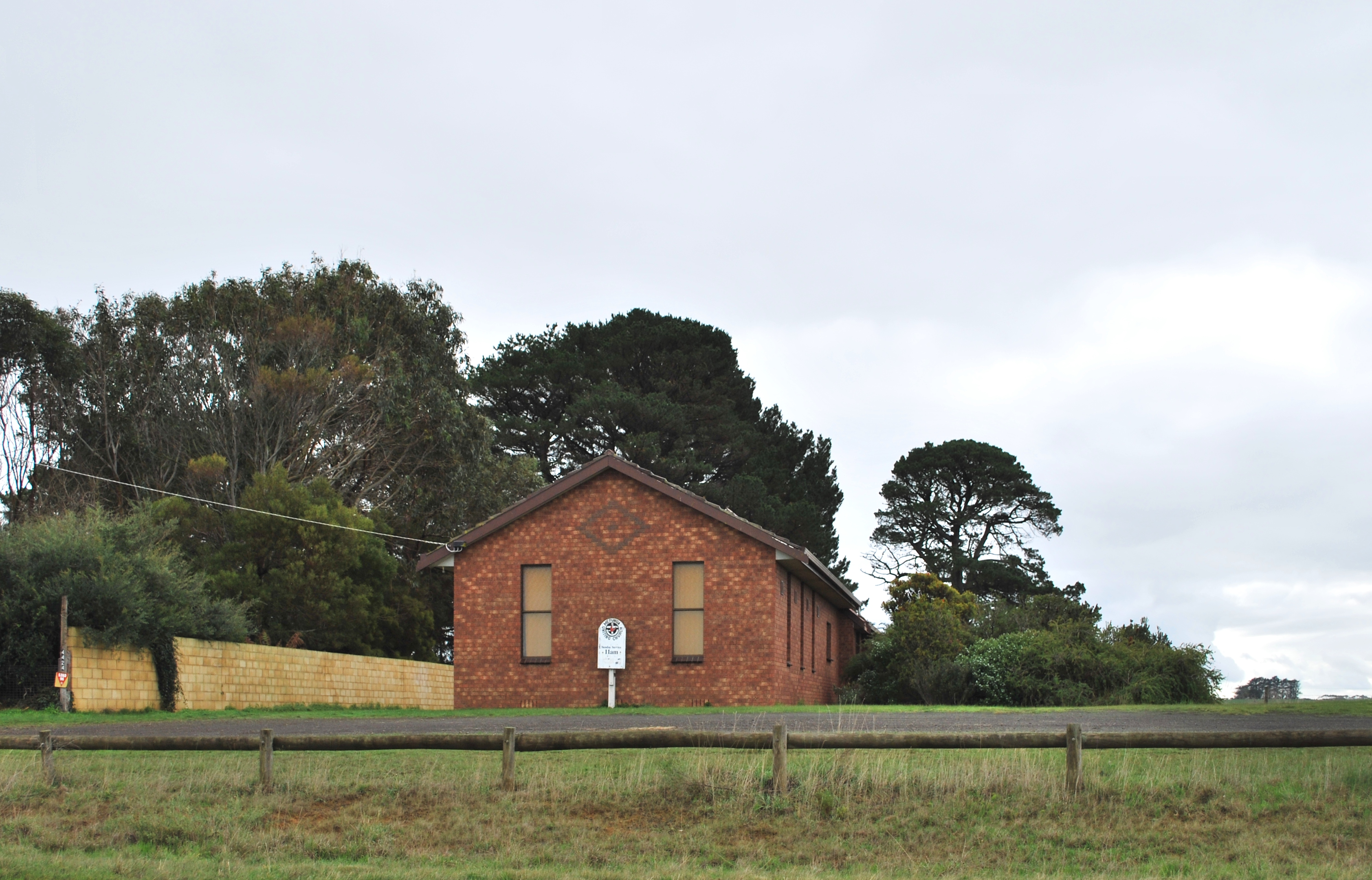
- Uniting church at Mepunga

- Coordinates: 38°26′26″S 142°42′01″E
- Population: 47 (2016 census)
- Postcode(s): 3277
- Location: 243 km (151 mi) W of Melbourne; 23 km (14 mi) SE of Warrnambool
- LGA(s): Shire of Moyne
- State electorate(s): South-West Coast
- Federal division(s): Wannon

Mepunga is a locality in south west Victoria, Australia. The locality is in the Shire of Moyne, 243 kilometres (151 mi) west of the state capital, Melbourne.

At the 2016 census, Mepunga had a population of 47.

== Traditional ownership ==
The formally recognised traditional owners for the area in which Mepunga sits are the Eastern Maar people, who are represented by the Eastern Maar Aboriginal Corporation (EMAC).
