= Macarthur, Victoria =

Macarthur Victoria
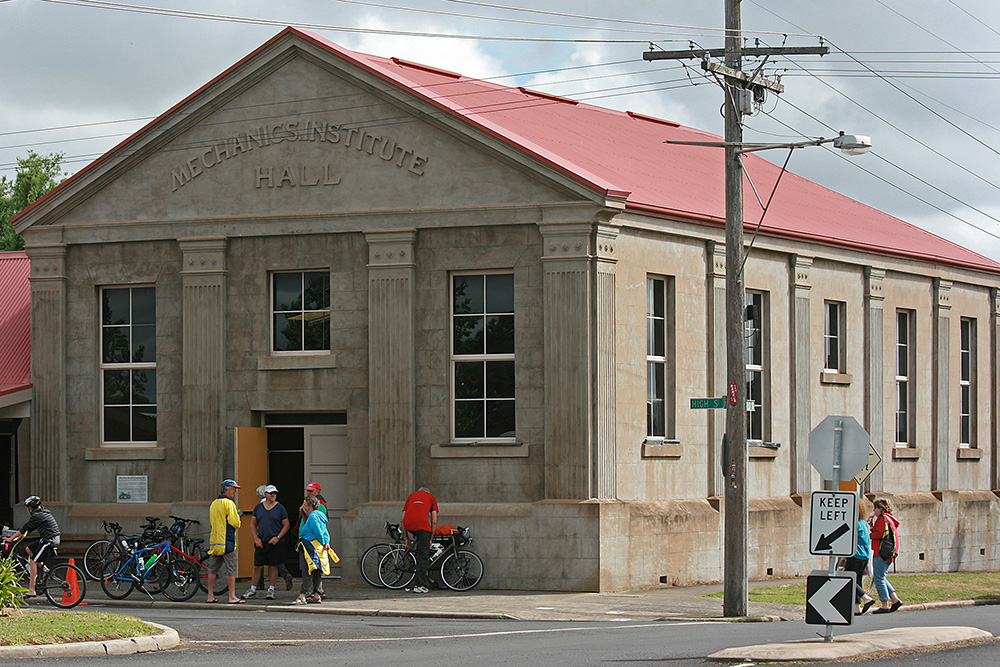
- Mechanics' Institute Hall

- Coordinates: 38°01′S 142°00′E
- Population: 522 (2016 census)
- Postcode(s): 3286
- LGA(s): Shire of Moyne
- State electorate(s): Polwarth
- Federal division(s): Wannon

Macarthur (/məˈkɑːrθər/) originally known as Eumeralla, is a town in the Western District of Victoria, Australia on the Hamilton-Port Fairy Road. It is in the Shire of Moyne local government area and the federal Division of Wannon. At the 2016 census, Macarthur and the surrounding area had a population of 522.

== History ==
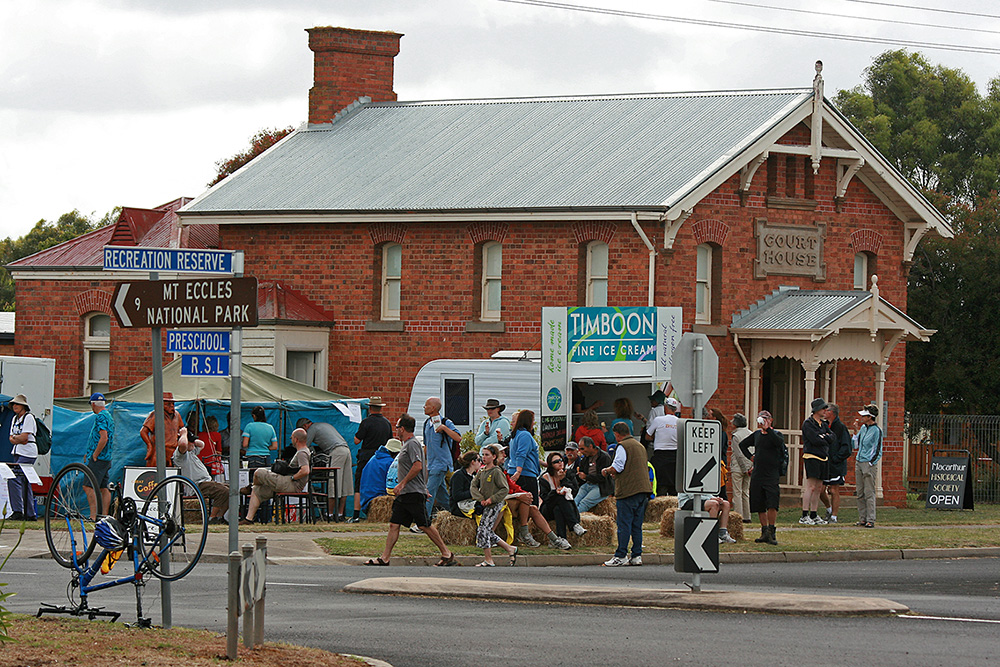
The Macarthur Court House building, now the Historical Society building

=== Aboriginal residency and traditional ownership ===
Before British colonisation, the region around Macarthur was occupied by the Worerome killink gundidj clan of the Gunditjmara people.

The formally recognised traditional owners for the area in which Macarthur sits are groups within the Eastern Maar and Gunditjmara peoples, who are represented by the Eastern Maar Aboriginal Corporation (EMAC) and the Gunditj Mirring Traditional Owners Aboriginal Corporation (GMTOAC).

=== British pastoral licences ===
In 1840, the Bolden brothers were the first British pastoralists to obtain crown leaseholds in the region. The immense leasehold, named Bolden's run, covered large amounts of land west of the Hopkins River. In 1842, the Boldens' leasehold was divided up and the resultant properties around what was to become the Macarthur region were known as Eumeralla East, Eumeralla West and Harton Hills (which was also known as Blackfellows Creek). The Eumeralla leaseholds were taken up by James Hunter and his associates, while Harton Hills was occupied by William Carmichael.

=== Township of Macarthur ===
In 1852, the Eumeralla Inn, built by Mr. Gwyther was the first building constructed.

The township was laid out near the Eumeralla River by surveyor John Turner, with the first land sales taking place shortly after on 17 July 1857.

Macarthur Post Office opened 1 January 1862.

The Macarthur Magistrates' Court closed on 1 January 1983.

== Community ==
The town in conjunction with neighbouring township Hawkesdale has an Australian Rules football team competing in the Mininera & District Football League.

Golfers play at the course of the Macarthur Golf Club on Hamilton Road.

Macarthur is also the site of the large Macarthur Wind Farm, completed in 2013.

Macarthur was Victoria's Tidiest Town in 1988.
