= Grassmere, Victoria =

Grassmere Victoria
- Coordinates: 38.2582°S 142.5411°E
- Population: 385 (SAL 2021)
- Postcode(s): 3281
- LGA(s): Shire of Moyne
- State electorate(s): South-West Coast
- Federal division(s): Wannon

Grassmere is a locality in the Shire of Moyne, Victoria, Australia.

== History ==
The area of Grassmere was taken up for a pastoral property in 1839. In 1842, Thomas Manifold, who was amongst the first settlers in the area, named his pastoral run Grasmere, taking the name from the village of the same name.

The Grassmere post office opened on 16 May 1884 and closed and closed on 29 October 1993.

== Traditional ownership ==
The formally recognised traditional owners for the area in which Grassmere sits are the Eastern Maar People who are represented by the Eastern Maar Aboriginal Corporation.
