= Southern Cross, Victoria =

Southern Cross Victoria
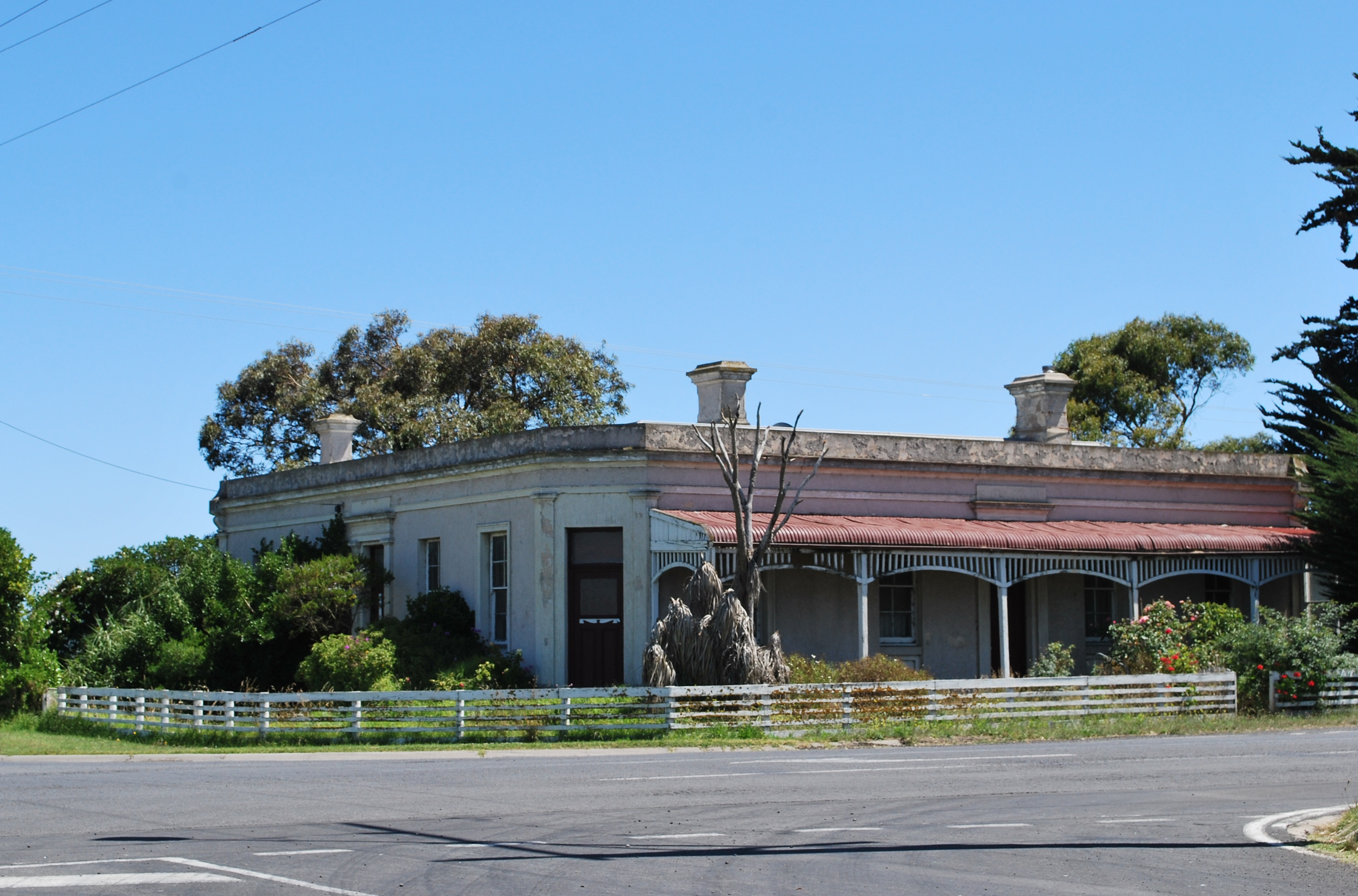
- The former Southern Cross Hotel, built in 1875

- Coordinates: 38°17′46″S 142°24′13″E
- Population: 117 (2016 census)
- Postcode(s): 3283
- Location: 272 km (169 mi) W of Melbourne; 16 km (10 mi) NW of Warrnambool; 5 km (3 mi) E of Koroit
- LGA(s): Shire of Moyne
- State electorate(s): South-West Coast
- Federal division(s): Wannon

Southern Cross is a locality in south west Victoria, Australia. The locality is in the Shire of Moyne 272 kilometres (169 mi) west of the state capital, Melbourne.

At the 2016 census, Southern Cross had a population of 117.

Coughlan's Southern Cross Hotel was built in 1875 but was stripped of its liquor licence in 1918. The building is now in private hands.
