= Nora Hood =

Aboriginal Australian religious figure (1836–1871)

Nora Hood (born Ageebonyee, née Villiers; c. 1836 – 28 March 1871) was an Aboriginal Australian Christian religious figure. Literate in English due to her job as a domestic servant, she became prominent for her knowledge of Christianity, with one missionary using her as a justification for further Christianization of the Aboriginals.

== Biography ==
Ageebonyee was born circa 1836 in Korrewarra. (Note: Possibly today Irrewarra in Victoria.) Her parents were Ningi Burning and Nango Burn. She was baptized in Warrnambool on 24 June 1853, taking the name Nora Villiers. On 1 November 1855, she married an Aboriginal stockman named Merang – the 19-year-old son of a Djab Wurrung "king" – in a Christian ceremony presided over by the Reverend William Hamilton. The couple lived in Hexham, where her husband worked on a pastoral run. In 1856, Merang changed his name to Collin Hood, taking the surname of his employer Robert Hood. He became a trusted employee of the cattle station and received equal pay to his white co-workers.

Around this time, Nora Hood became a domestic servant for a settler family. Through this role, she became fluent in reading and writing English; this was considered exceptional for an Aboriginal woman of this time, with her husband's employer describing her as "highly civilised". She also became well-versed in Christianity. In one instance in 1863, missionary John Gibson Paton reported that when he had once visited her home unannounced, he found her reading a copy of the Presbyterian Messenger – a record of the Presbyterian Church – while using the Bible as a reference tool. At a meeting in Melbourne with other religious figures, Paton argued in favor of greater efforts to "give the Gospel to the Aborigines", specifically using Hood and her letters as justification. A Presbyterian minister named William Hamilton – presumably the same William Hamilton who officiated her wedding – also described her as one of the only Aboriginal women he knew who "possess[ed] a greater amount of religious knowledge than many of our white population".

In 1860, Hood and her husband were among the first Aboriginal Australians to apply for a land grant from the government of Victoria following a passage of a new law which "introduced a policy of providing for the dispossessed Aborigines". Intending to become farmers, they were initially granted the land but this was later rescinded. The couple were forced to relocate to the Aboriginal reserve in Framlingham. They had six children together, with four surviving into adulthood.

Nora Hood died in Melbourne on 28 March 1871, aged 35. She was buried in Melbourne's New Cemetery two days later. Her husband Collin would go on to become a prominent leader in the Aboriginal community.
