= Rosebrook, Victoria =

Rosebrook Victoria
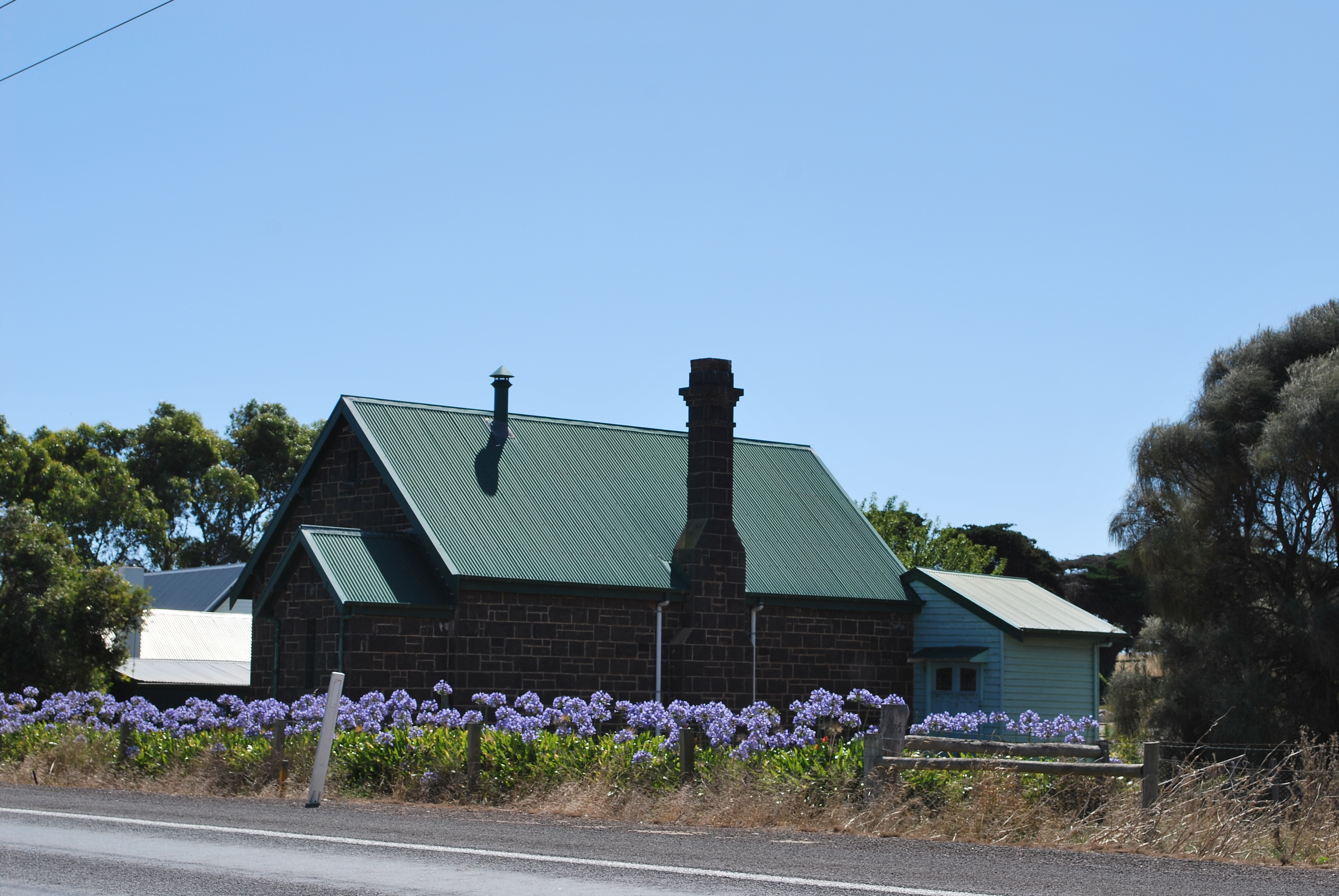
- Former public school No. 526 at Rosebrook

- Coordinates: 38°21′03″S 142°15′32″E
- Population: 132 (2016 census)
- Postcode(s): 3285
- Location: 282 km (175 mi) SW of Melbourne; 5 km (3 mi) NE of PortFairy
- LGA(s): Shire of Moyne
- State electorate(s): Polwarth
- Federal division(s): Wannon

Rosebrook is a locality in southwest Victoria, Australia. The locality is in the Shire of Moyne, 282 kilometres (175 mi) west of the state capital, Melbourne.

At the 2016 census, Rosebrook had a population of 132.

== Traditional ownership ==
The formally recognised traditional owners for the area in which Rosebrook sits are the Eastern Maar people, who are represented by the Eastern Maar Aboriginal Corporation (EMAC).
