= Panmure, Victoria =

Panmure
- Town
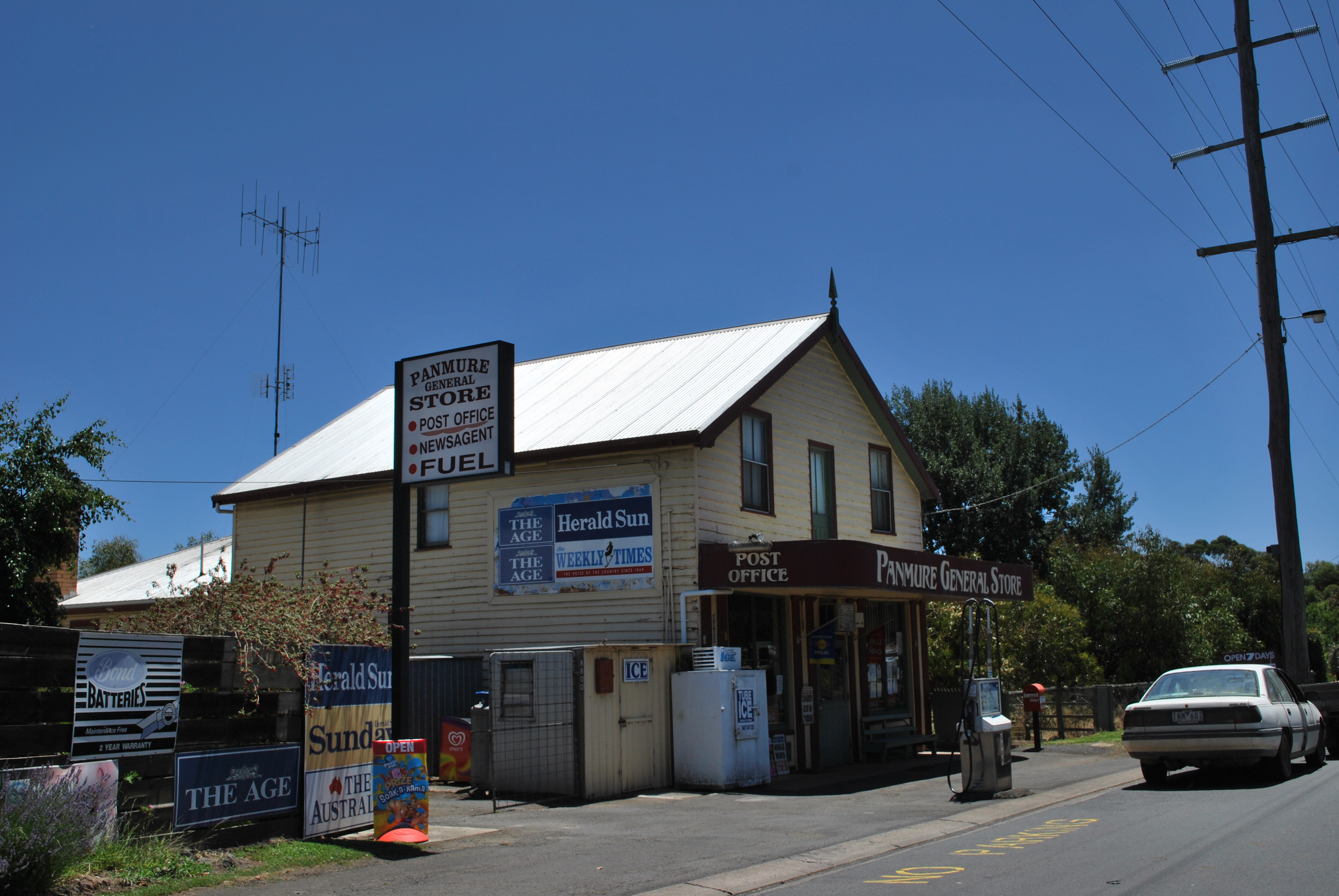
- General store and post office

- Coordinates: 38°20′0″S 142°44′0″E
- Country: Australia
- State: Victoria
- LGA: Shire of Moyne
- Location: 240 km (150 mi) SW of Melbourne; 166 km (103 mi) W of Geelong; 25 km (16 mi) NE of Warrnambool; 22 km (14 mi) SW of Terang

Government
  - State electorate: South-West Coast
  - Federal division: Wannon

Population
  - Total: 424 (2016 census)
- Postcode: 3265

Panmure /pənˈmjuːə/ is a town in the south west of Victoria, Australia. At the 2006 census, Panmure and the surrounding area had a population of 421. Situated on the Princes Highway, the town is halfway between Terang and Warrnambool.

The township was established in the 1850s. Timbercutters came to the area to harvest the river red gum, stringybark and messmate trees, which were transported by bullock teams to nearby sawmills. The clearing of the native forest and relatively high rainfall gave rise to a thriving dairy industry, which persists today. Panmure Post Office opened on 1 January 1867.

At its peak in the late nineteenth Century, Panmure consisted of a police station and courthouse, two sawmills, a blacksmith, a butcher, three churches, a pub, two stores, a bakery, and a school. The railway though the town was opened in 1890, and the town once had its own local railway station.

The town hit international headlines, in 1883, when a ten-year-old girl, Margaret Nolan, was brutally murdered and sexually assaulted by a man called Henry Morgan. Margaret Nolan was the eldest daughter of local grazier John Nolan, and his wife Bridget (née Curtis). The girl's body was found by her father, at the intersection of the Ellerslie-Panmure Road and the Princes highway. Morgan was executed for the crime in 1884, at Ararat.

On 16 February 1983, the "Ash Wednesday" bushfires swept through the district destroying many homes, farm buildings and livestock. Today, the town has a pub, a general store/post office, a primary school and sporting facilities that host cricket, netball clubs and an Australian Rules football team competing in the Warrnambool & District Football League.

The Mount Emu Creek runs through the town, and forms a nice swimming hole known as the "hole" or the "big hole". Adjacent to the swimming hole in the Recreation Reserve is a natural spring that is of cultural significance to the local Indigenous community.

Mount Warrnambool, a prominent landmark, is nearby.

== Traditional ownership ==
The formally recognised traditional owners for the area in which Panmure sits are the Eastern Maar people, who are represented by the Eastern Maar Aboriginal Corporation.
