= Garvoc =

Garvoc Victoria
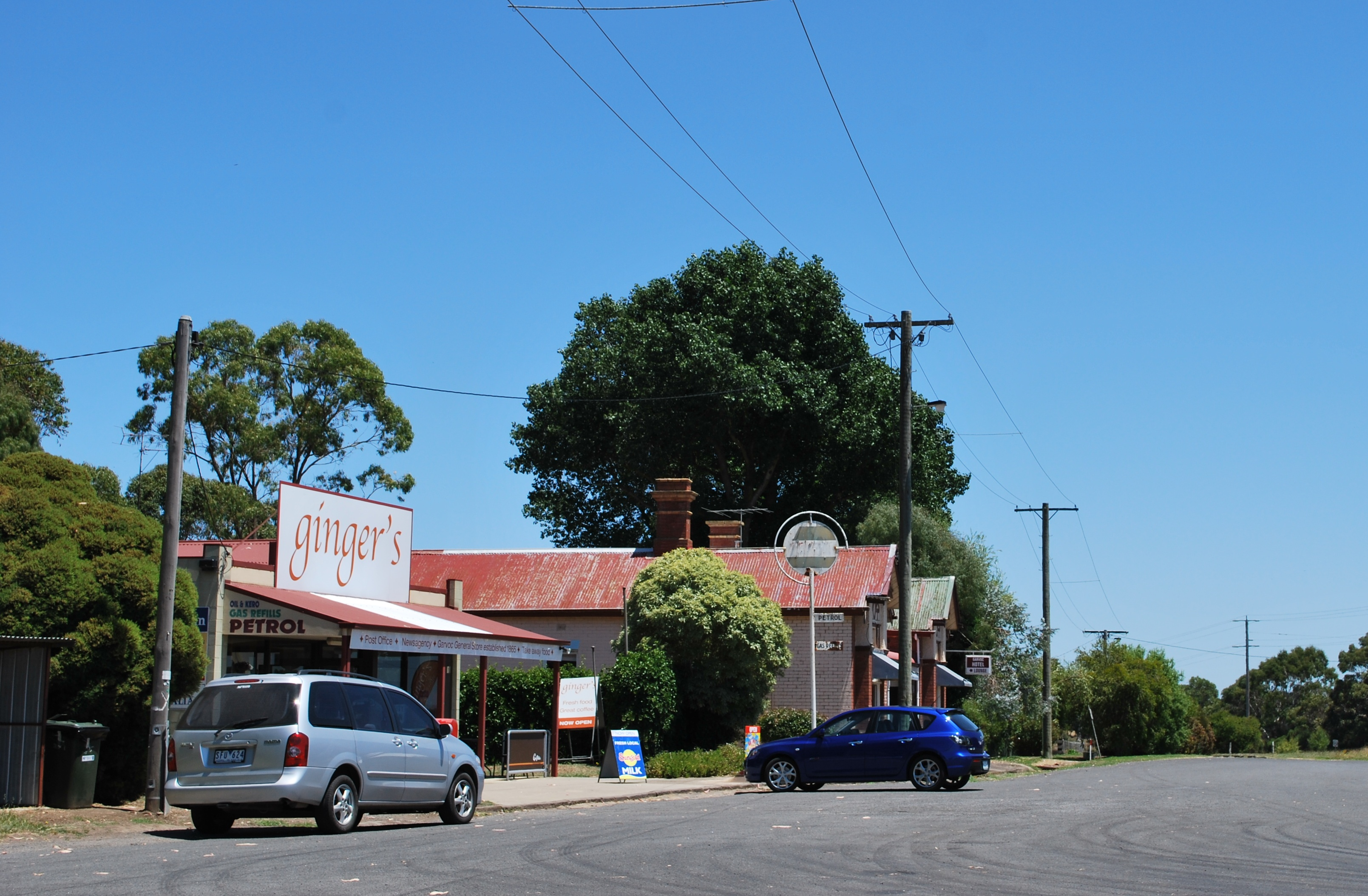
- The commercial centre of Garvoc

- Coordinates: 38°18′0″S 142°49′0″E
- Population: 248 (SAL 2021)
- Postcode(s): 3265
- Location: 223 km (139 mi) SW of Melbourne; 33 km (21 mi) NE of Warrnambool; 13 km (8 mi) SW of Terang
- LGA(s): Shire of Moyne
- State electorate(s): Polwarth
- Federal division(s): Wannon

Garvoc (/ˈɡɑːrvək/) is a town in the Western District of Victoria, Australia. The town is located in the Moyne Shire local government area, 223 kilometres (139 mi) south west of the state capital, Melbourne.

The town is the proposed location for a regional livestock selling centre servicing the area between Warrnambool and Colac.

== Traditional ownership ==
The formally recognised traditional owners for the area in which Garvoc sits are groups within the Eastern Maar people, who are represented by the Eastern Maar Aboriginal Corporation.
