= Ray Anderson (footballer) =

Australian rules footballer

Personal information
- Full name: Ray Anderson
- Born: 26 August 1947 (age 79)
- Original team: Mortlake
- Height: 191 cm (6 ft 3 in)
- Weight: 81 kg (179 lb)

Playing career^{1}
| Years | Club | Games (Goals) |
| 1968–69 | South Melbourne | 9 (2) |
- ^{1} Playing statistics correct to the end of 1969.

Ray Anderson (born 26 August 1947) is a former Australian rules footballer who played with South Melbourne in the Victorian Football League (VFL).
