= Winslow, Victoria =

Winslow Victoria
- Coordinates: 38°15′S 142°24′E
- Population: 368 (2016)
- Postcode(s): 3281
- Location: 264 km (164 mi) W of Melbourne; 17 km (11 mi) NW of Warrnambool; 8 km (5 mi) s of Woolsthorpe; 6 km (4 mi) N of Mailors Flat
- LGA(s): Shire of Moyne
- State electorate(s): South-West Coast
- Federal division(s): Wannon

Winslow is a locality in western Victoria, Australia. It is in the Shire of Moyne local government area, in what is commonly known as the Western District. Winslow is 17 km north of Warrnambool. It is believed that it was named after Winslow in Buckinghamshire, England.

The original occupants of the Winslow area were the Omegarrerer clan of Aboriginal Australians.

British colonisation began in 1840 when Nicholas McCann, Henry Loughnan and Lewis Lynch arrived in the region to set up a sheep station they named Greenhill. They encountered a region that was well populated with Aboriginal people who had constructed many fishing weirs along the creeks in the area. McCann told the approximately 75 native people who approached them, to leave and hostilities began soon afterwards. McCann was nearly speared and concluded that to stay on the property he would have to shoot "the blacks indiscriminately". Visiting in May 1841, George Augustus Robinson, the chief Protector of Aborigines in the region, found that the Omegarrerer had become extinct. McCann and his partners abandoned Greenhill around the same time and in December 1841, James Ritchie occupied the vacant land and established a cattle station.

The township of Winslow was gazetted during the 1850s. Winslow was situated on an edge of the freshwater Lake Cartcarrong. When Lake Cartcarrong is full it covers 22 hectares. It gets stocked with brown trout yearlings.

There are 368 people in Winslow 2016 census, this has increased from 298 2011 census
