= Nullawarre =

Nullawarre Victoria
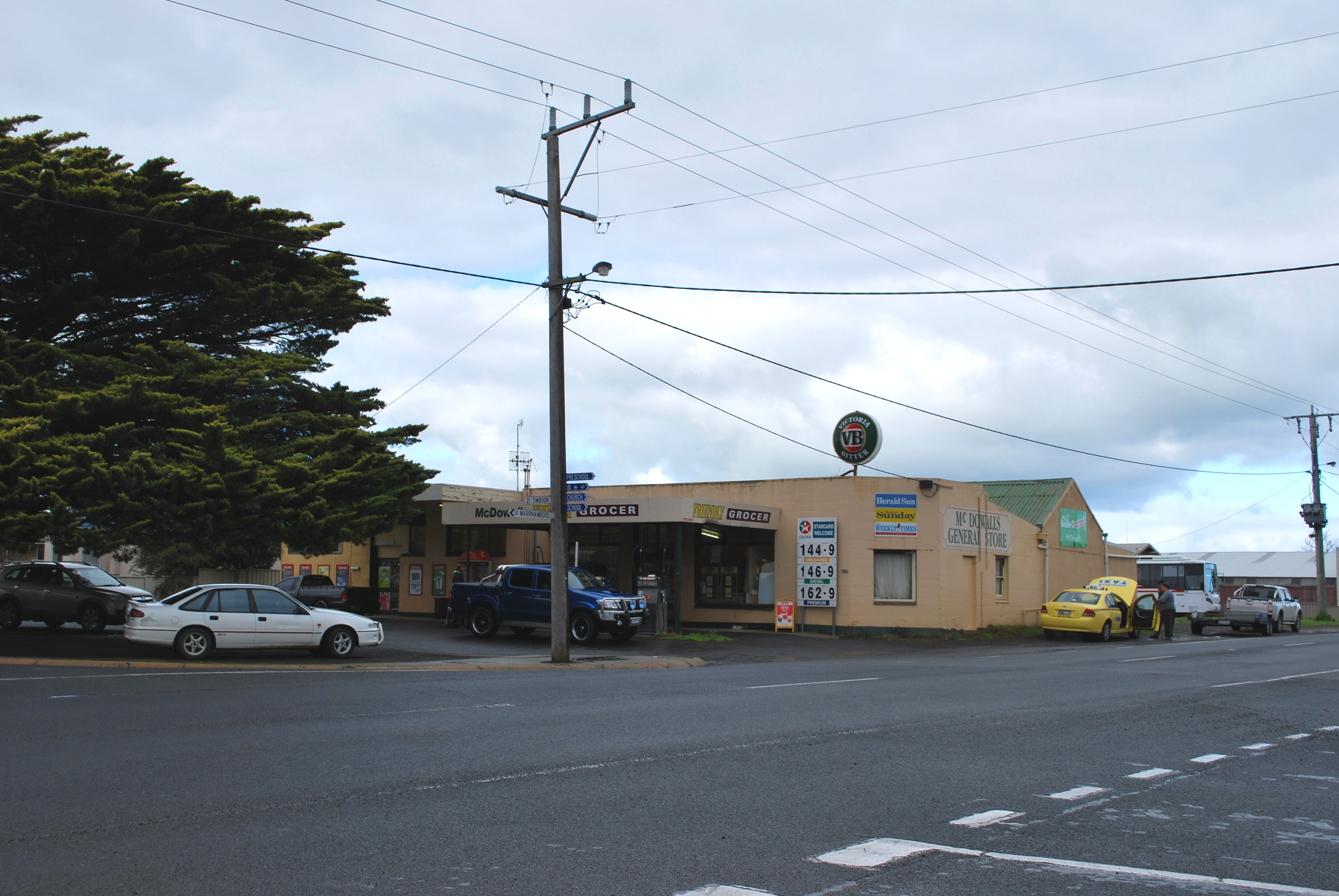
- General Store on the Great Ocean Road

- Coordinates: 38°28′09″S 142°44′51″E
- Population: 267 (2016 census)
- Postcode(s): 3268
- Location: 243 km (151 mi) SW of Melbourne; 30 km (19 mi) SE of Warrnambool
- LGA(s): Shire of Moyne
- State electorate(s): Polwarth
- Federal division(s): Wannon

Nullawarre is a locality in south west Victoria, Australia. The locality is in the Shire of Moyne and on the Great Ocean Road, 243 kilometres (151 mi) west of the state capital, Melbourne.

At the 2016 census, Nullawarre had a population of 267.
