= Wangoom =

- Town
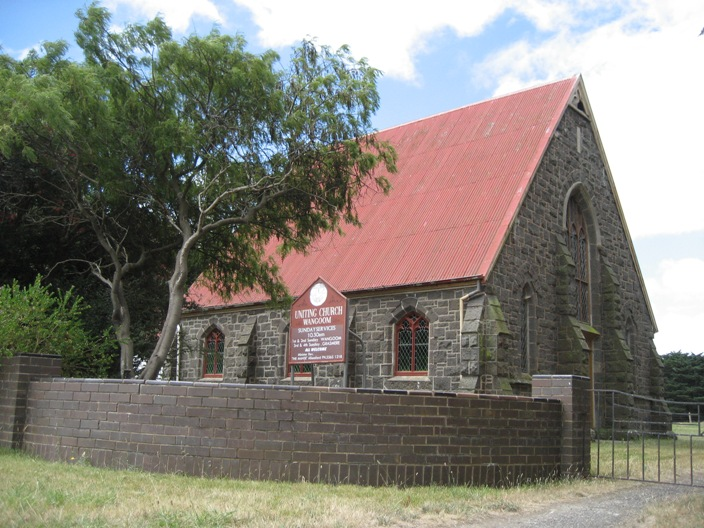
- Wangoom Uniting Church, c1861

- Coordinates: 38°20′S 142°35′E
- Country: Australia
- State: Victoria
- LGA: Shire of Moyne
- Location: 255 km (158 mi) SW of Melbourne; 12 km (7.5 mi) NE of Warrnambool
- Established: 1870s

Government
  - State electorate: South West Coast
  - Federal division: Wannon

Population
  - Total: 378 (2006 census)
- Postcode: 3279

Wangoom (/ˈwɒŋɡuːm/ WONG-goom) is a town in the Western District of Victoria, 255 kilometres (158 mi) from the state capital, Melbourne and 12 kilometres (7.5 mi) from the regional centre of Warrnambool. The population at the 2006 census was 378.

After European settlement of the area in the 1840s mixed farming was conducted by many landowners and leasees until the introduction of the milking machine followed by a period where most farms derived a large proportion of their income from dairying. Since 1970 most of the smaller dairies have ceased operating and the few remaining farms are considerably larger in size often using land previously used by smaller dairy farms.

== Facilities ==
Wangoom hosts a general store and post office (first registered in 1877) which provides a range of services including Tea Rooms. Also located in the main thoroughfare is a memorial town hall, two tennis courts, CFA Fire Station and a disused milk depot.

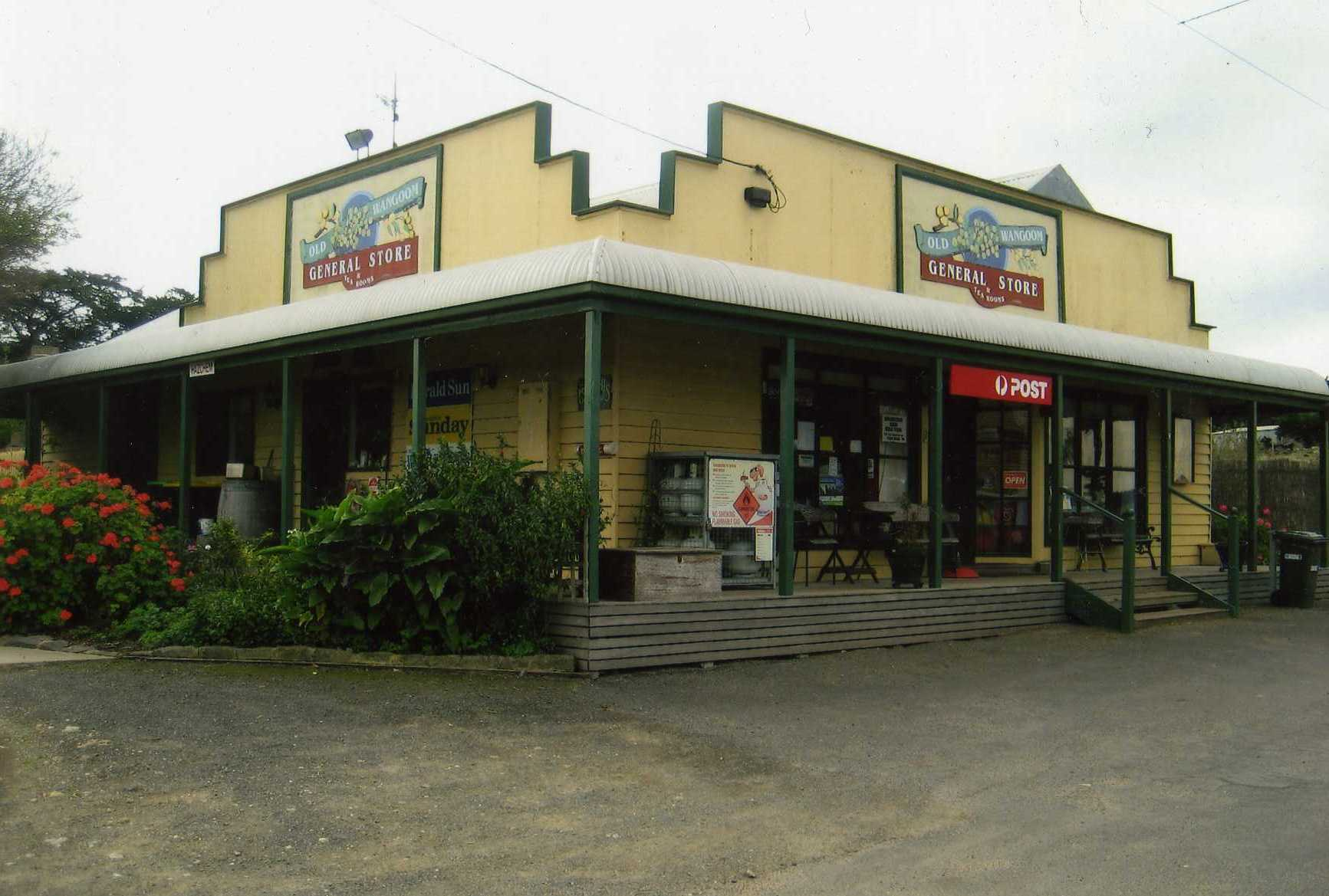
Wangoom General Store est 1908

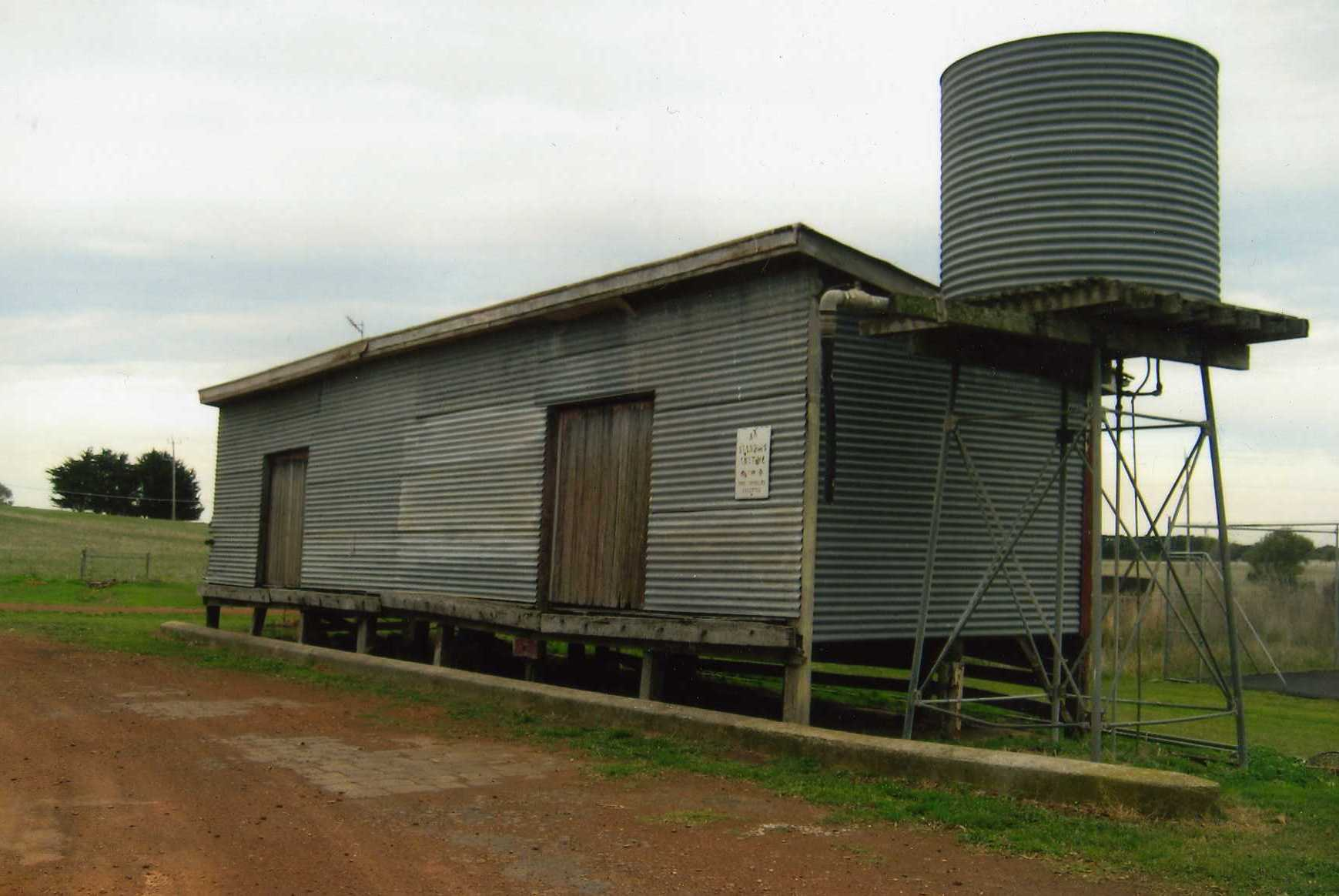
Wangoom Milk Depot

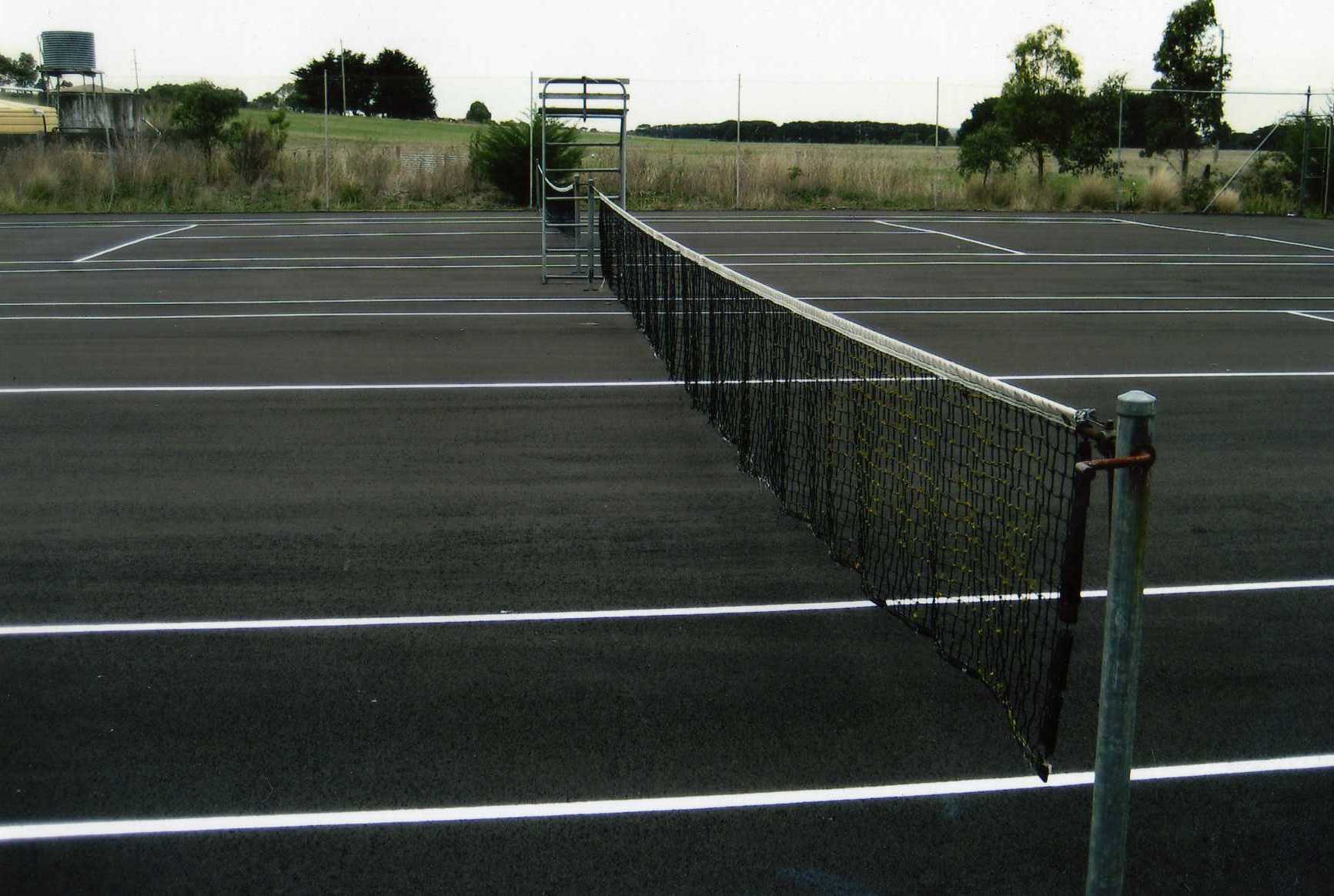
Wangoom Tennis Hardcourts

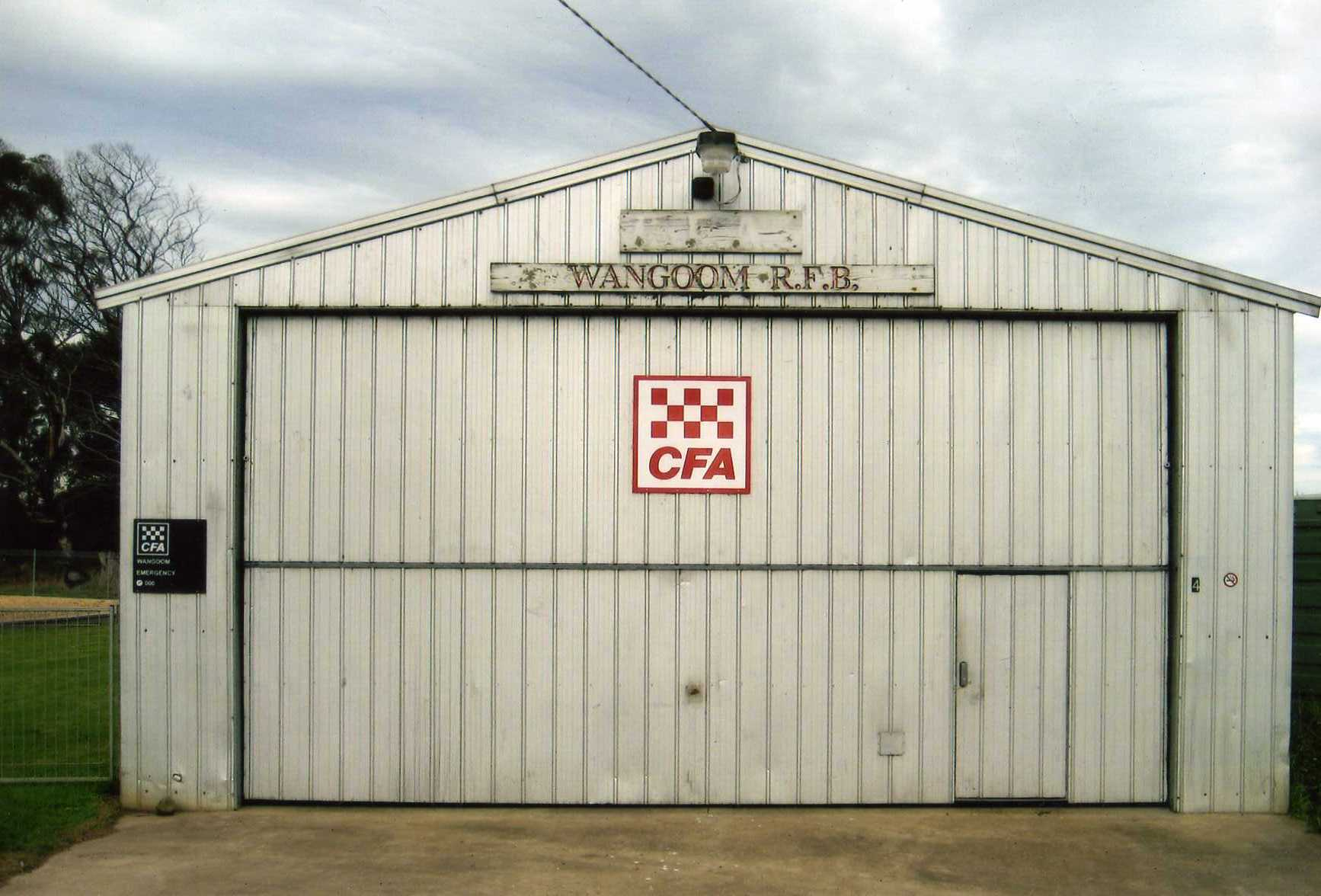
Wangoom Fire Station

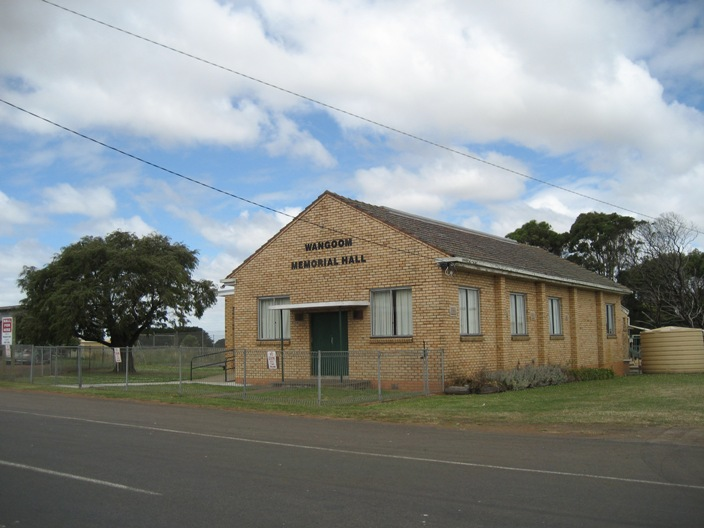
Wangoom Memorial Hall C1963

The Wangoom Recreation Reserve (c1921) is the home of the Wangoom Cricket Club which has three senior and two junior teams competing in the Grassmere Cricket Association.. The reserve is also used by the Warrnambool Cyclist Club. The reserve was formally the home of the Wangoom Football and Women's Basketball Clubs both now in recess.

The Hopkins Falls at Wangoom is a popular tourist attraction and a site to be seen particularly when heavy inflows occur and torrents of water and foam roar over the falls. The Crawley (formally Hopkins Falls ) Bridge which crosses the Hopkins River above the falls at 304 feet (93 m) in length and containing six spans was completed in 1938. The Bridge was renamed in 1962 to honour the service to the Warrnambool Shire by members of the Crawley family.

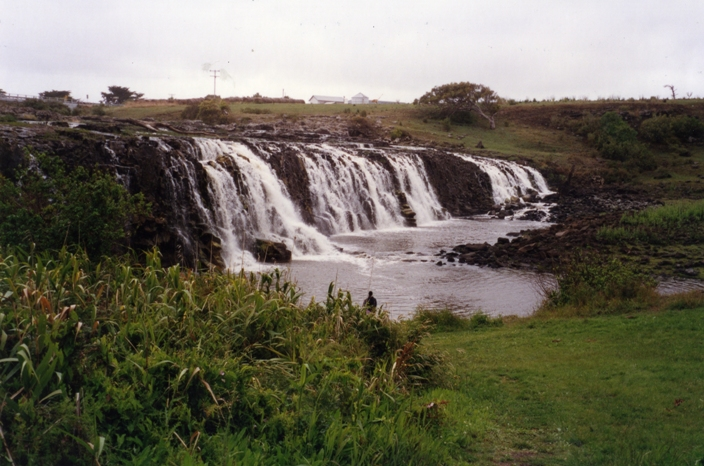
Hopkins Falls C1993

The Wangoom Uniting Church (formally Presbyterian) on Hughs Road continues to conduct regular services. The Wangoom Methodist Church (formally Wesleyan) closed in 1963. This church was located on the corner of Wangoom and St Marys Roads. After the church was closed in 1963 the building was relocated to Simpson to be used as a Sunday School.

== History ==
Family names that have long associations with Wangoom over the period 1852 to 2011 include Melican, Adams, Crothers, Lee, Flett, Giles, Rea, O'Keefe, Trigg, Dixon, Wright, Mahood, Wickham, Glasgow, Henderson and Bell, Tozer.

Lake Wangoom was a popular attraction for locals and visitors alike to conduct activities such as fishing and boating in the early days of white settlement however at the turn of the 20th century the lake dried out naturally and could no longer be relied upon as a regular water course. The lake land was sold to adjoining landholders and a pumping station set up to drain water from the lake to the nearby Hopkins River. There is no current public access to the 'lake'.

The Wangoom State School (formally National School) operated from 1852 till its closure in 1992. The school building remains on site while the school house was sold and removed to Lake Gillear. The school grounds are now used as a 'Laser Strike' Venue.

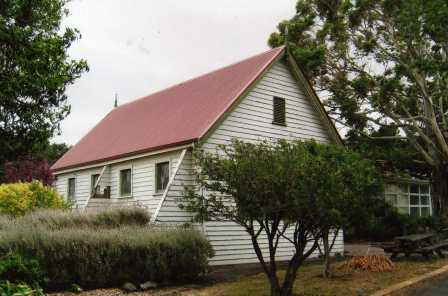
Wangoom State School No 645

From 1933 to 1948, the Warrnambool Plumpton Coursing Club held Field Coursing events at the Wangoom Enclosure located off St.Mary's Road. During this period, the club held many of the states major classic events including the Victorian Oaks and Derby and the St. Leger stakes.

=== Timeline ===
1850s

- 18 Dec 1855, Tenders called for a School House and Residence, near Lake Wangoom.
- 1 July 1856, Opening of the ‘Bush Inn’ Hotel – situated on the main road to Lake Wangoom – 3.5 miles (5.6 km) from Warrnambool.
- 17/18 March 1857, St. Patrick’s Day – ‘Pleasant Hill Races’ held at William Walls, Bush Inn at Wangoom.

1860s

- 12 February 1860, Opening of the Wangoom Wesleyan (later Methodist) Church.
- 20 June 1861, Opening of the Wangoom Presbyterianism (later Uniting) Church.

1870s

- 17 October 1877, Wangoom Post office commenced operation.
- Jan 1878, Hopkins Falls State School opens.

1880s

- 11 May 1886, First running of the Wangoom Handicap held at the Warrnambool Autumn Race Carnival. Won by G.H. Whitehead's horse 'Speculation'

1910s

- 22 August 1910, Opening of new public telephone at Wangoom.

1920s

- 31 October 1921, Meeting held to establish the Wangoom Recreation Reserve Trust and arrange for purchase of reserve land.
- 23 August 1924, Wangoom declared ‘Premiers and Champions’ of the South Western District Football Association completing the season undefeated.
- 15 May 1926, Mrs Lucy McLean (daughter of Francis Tozer) of Wangoom Park donates 50 acres (20 ha) to be shared for the benefit of four district schools including the Wangoom State School.

1930s

- 11 October 1931, Australian gliding record set by H. K. Morris at Lake Wangoom who stayed in the air for 2 hours 15 minutes.
- 13–14 October 1933, The Wangoom Plumpton hosts its 2-day ‘Grand Opening Meeting’ on behalf of the Warrnambool Plumpton Coursing Club.
- 1938 The Hopkins Falls (later Crawley) Bridge at 304 feet and 6 spans is completed.

1940s

- 1 July 1948, Wangoom Young Farmers formed at the instigation of Cecil Houston.

1950s

- 3 November 1956, Historic ‘Wangoom Park’ Homestead (c1870) destroyed by fire.
- 12 December 1958, Official opening of the R.S.L Wangoom Memorial Hall.

1960s

- March 1960, Wangoom wins first Senior cricket premiership in Grassmere Association.
- 26 March 1966, Wangoom, led by retiring Captain, Norm Wright win their 2nd Senior Grassmere Cricket Association Final.

1970s
1 May 1973 Small Bubble wins the Wangoom Handicap at Warrnambool Races.

                       Distance:1200 metres. Time: 1-11.5. Weight: 50 kg. Breeding: Skidby by Small Story. 
                       Trainer: R Winks. Jockey: P.J. Finger. Part owner: Mr M Sykes. (Possibly first Wangoom Handicap in metrics)

- 23 March 1974, The community celebrates 122 years of education at Wangoom S.S. No. 645.
- 2 September 1976, Formation of the Wangoom Tennis Club.
- January 1977, Completion of the Wangoom Tennis Courts.

2000s

- 1 July 2004, The Wangoom Co-Operative was formed.
- March 2009, Wangoom B grade wins premiership in Grassmere Cricket Association

== Notable people ==
- Clare Lindop, the first female jockey to ride in the Victoria Derby and Melbourne Cup and also the first to win the Victoria Derby (2008).
