= Mailors Flat =

Mailors Flat Victoria
- Coordinates: 38°17′S 142°26′E
- Population: 425 (2016)
- Postcode(s): 3275
- Location: 258 km (160 mi) W of Melbourne; 10 km (6 mi) NW of Warrnambool; 14 km (9 mi) s of Woolsthorpe; 6 km (4 mi) N of Winslow
- LGA(s): Shire of Moyne
- State electorate(s): South-West Coast
- Federal division(s): Wannon

Mailors Flat is a locality in western Victoria, Australia. It is in the Shire of Moyne local government area, in what is commonly known as the Western District. Mailors Flat is 10 km north of Warrnambool. It was named after Robert Mailor who took up a pastoral run in 1842.

By the 1870s, Mailor's pastoral run was broken up into smaller farms. This brought more families into the area and a school was opened in 1873.

After the WW2, the Warrnambool Airport was laid out to the west of the township.

In 2006/07 Mailors Flat boasted the highest annual income in the Western District. A Local Moyne Shire councillor Jim Doukas suggested the reason was that many locals ran successful businesses in Warrnambool and moved out to Mailors Flat for the larger housing blocks and lifestyle.
