= Kirkstall, Victoria =

Town in Victoria, Australia

Kirkstall, located in southwest Victoria, Australia, five kilometres (3.1 mi) from Koroit, is in the heart of the traditional lands of the local Aboriginal people; the Gunditjmara. On Monday 25 February 1861, Kirkstall was officially proclaimed a township by the then Governor of the Colony of Victoria, Sir Henry Barkly. On 25 February 2011, the town celebrated its 150th anniversary.
