= Caramut =

- Town
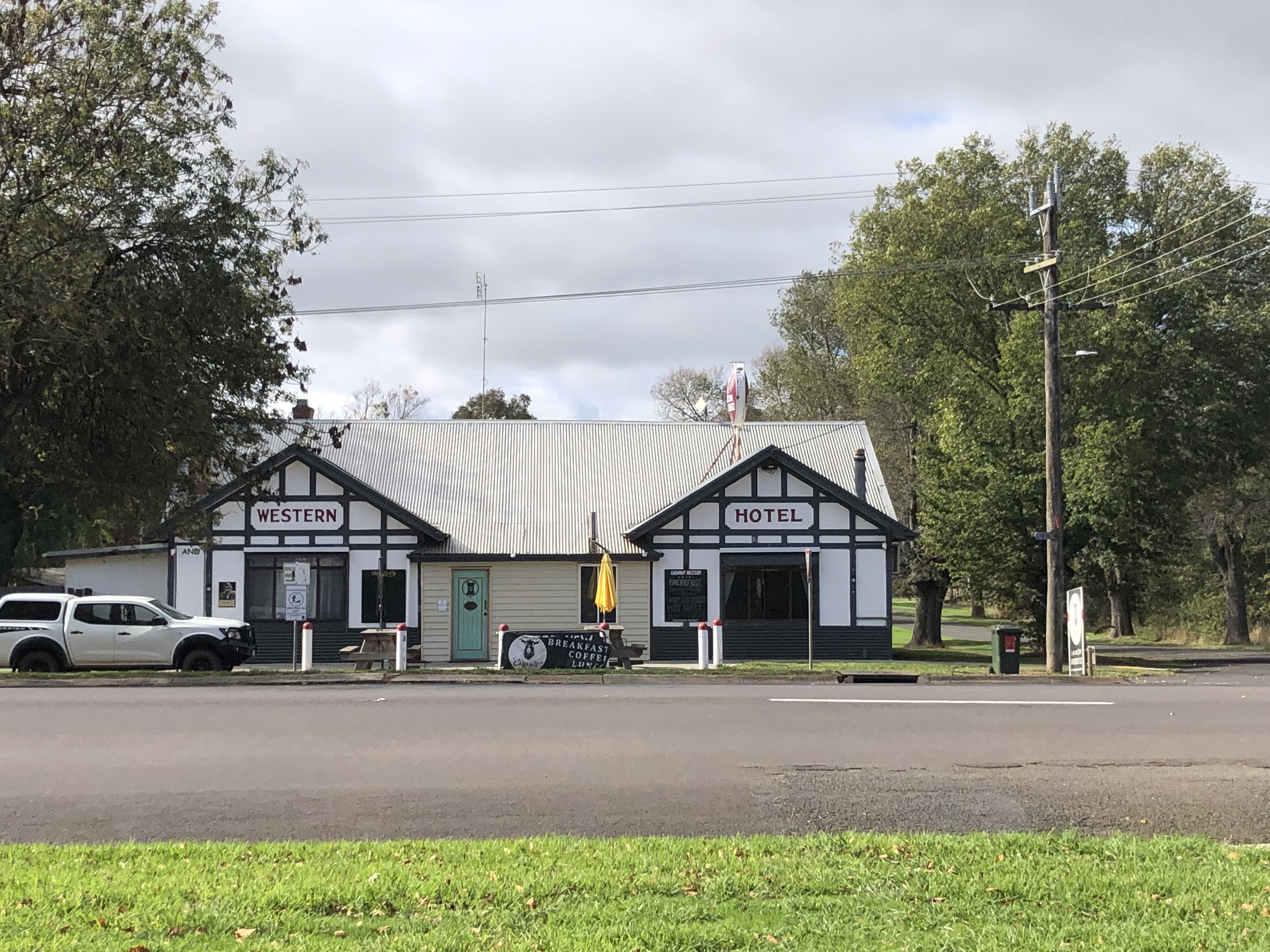
- Caramut (Western) Hotel

- Coordinates: 37°57′S 142°31′E
- Country: Australia
- State: Victoria
- LGA: Shire of Moyne
- Location: 55 km (34 mi) N of Warrnambool; 33 km (21 mi) NW of Mortlake; 24 km (15 mi) SE of Penshurst

Government
  - State electorate: Lowan
  - Federal division: Wannon

Population
  - Total: 246 (2016 census)
- Postcode: 3274

Caramut /ˈkærəmət/ is a town in the Western District of Victoria, Australia on the Hamilton Highway. It is in the Shire of Moyne local government area and the federal Division of Wannon.

The name "Caramut" is believed to be derived from an Aboriginal word cooramook, thought to mean "plenty of possums".

At the 2006 census, Caramut and the surrounding area had a population of 392. At the 2016 census, Caramut and the surrounding area had a population of 246.

== History ==
There is evidence that Aboriginal people had established a village of domed huts near Caramut before white settlement. The Protector of Aborigines, George Augustus Robinson, produced drawings of structures in the area circa 1840.

In 1839 the Caramut area was first settled by John Muston as a pastoral run.

In 1842, the Lubra Creek massacre of six Dhauwurd wurrung people took place on the Caramut run, leased by Thomas Osbrey and Sidney Smith at the time.

The Post Office opened on 1 March 1848 as Muston's Creek and was renamed Caramut in 1854.

== Traditional ownership ==
The formally recognised traditional owners for the area in which Caramut sits are groups within the Eastern Maar peoples, who are represented by the Eastern Maar Aboriginal Corporation (EMAC).

== Community ==
The town has an Australian Rules football team competing in the Mininera & District Football League.

== See also ==
- Minjah
