= Koroit =

- Town
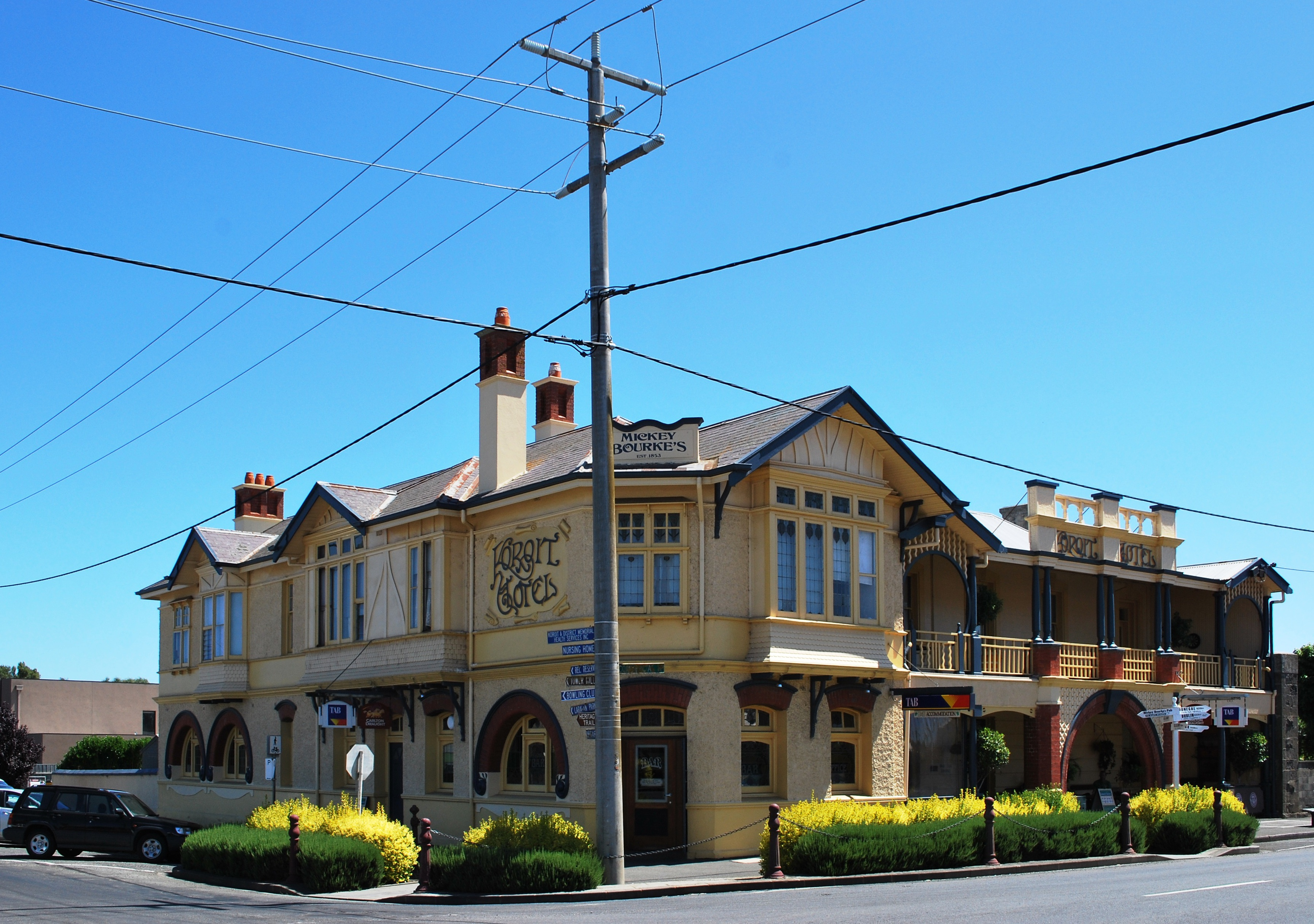
- Koroit Hotel. The signpost at the right of the picture gives distances to faraway towns in Ireland.

- Coordinates: 38°17′0″S 142°22′0″E
- Country: Australia
- State: Victoria
- LGA: Shire of Moyne
- Location: 272 km (169 mi) SW of Melbourne; 17 km (11 mi) NW of Warrnambool; 20 km (12 mi) NE of Port Fairy
- Established: 1857

Government
  - State electorate: South-West Coast
  - Federal division: Wannon

Population
  - Total: 2,184 (2021 census)
- Postcode: 3282

Koroit /kəˈrɔɪt/ is a small rural town in western Victoria, Australia a few kilometres north of the Princes Highway, 18 kilometres (11 mi) north-west of Warrnambool and 272 kilometres (169 mi) west of Melbourne. It is in the Shire of Moyne local government area located amidst rolling green pastures on the north rim of Tower Hill. At the 2021 census, Koroit had a population of 2,184. The town borrows its name from the Koroitch Gundidj people who occupied the area prior to European colonisation.

== History ==
For many thousands of years prior to British colonisation, the Koroit area was part of the lands of the indigenous Koroit gundidj people, whose descendants retain special links with the area.

The first confirmed European sighting of the area was of Tower Hill, the nearby inactive volcano, in 1802, by French explorers aboard Géographe, captained by Nicolas Baudin. The first European settler came to the Koroit area in 1837. During the 1840s and 1850s, a large number of Irish immigrants made Koroit their home. A strong and obvious links between Koroit and Ireland is the potato crops grown in the rich volcanic soil surrounding the town.

The township of Koroit was surveyed and the first town allotments were sold in 1857. A post office opened on 23 April 1858. Eight sites in Koroit are listed in the Register of the National Estate.

What became the Port Fairy railway line was extended to the town from Warrnambool in 1890, along with a branch to Hamilton, both being closed in 1977.

Koroit was originally part of the Shire of Belfast, Belfast being the original name of nearby Port Fairy. In the latter part of the 19th century, the township of Koroit separated from the Shire of Belfast and became the Borough of Koroit on 7 October 1870. In November 1870, nine new councillors were elected from fourteen candidates. On 10 December 1870, the new Borough of Koroit elected its first mayor. In 1985, the Borough of Koroit was merged with the Shire of Warrnambool and became part of the Shire of Moyne in 1994.

The Koroit Magistrates' Court closed on 15 June 1977, not having been visited by a magistrate since 1972.

The author Henry Handel Richardson lived in the Koroit post office as a child after her family moved to Koroit in 1878. Remembering Koroit from her youth, the third volume of her The Fortunes of Richard Mahony trilogy is set in the town. When the author was six, her father Walter died in Koroit on 1 August 1879 and was buried at the Koroit cemetery.

== Traditional ownership ==
The formally recognised traditional owners for the area in which Koroit sits are the Eastern Maar people, who are represented by the Eastern Maar Aboriginal Corporation (EMAC).

== Tower Hill ==
Tower Hill has always been a part of Koroit and in the town's earliest days the lake within the Tower Hill crater was the source of the town's drinking water. Tower Hill is an extinct volcano formed at least 30,000 years ago when a hot rising basaltic magma came into contact with the subterranean water table. The violent explosion that followed created the funnel-shaped crater (later filled by a lake) and the islands seen today. It is one in a line of more than 30 volcanoes that stretch from Colac to the East to Mount Gambier in South Australia. Artefacts found in the volcanic ash layers show that Aborigines were living in the area at the time of the eruption. This area including Tower Hill is part of the UNESCO-endorsed Kanawinka Geopark.

Tower Hill has always been public land, initially reserved as an Acclimatization Zone in 1866 it was declared a State Forest in 1872. An Act of Parliament on 5 December 1892 declared Tower Hill to be a National Park, Victoria's first and one of the earliest in the World. With no additional funding, management of the Tower Hill National Park was vested with the Borough of Koroit. To ease the burden on ratepayers, the Borough was forced to collect royalties from quarrying of volcanic road-making material and grazing leases. At the end of the 19th century, Tower Hill was a shadow of its former glory with bracken being the dominant vegetation and rabbits the dominant wildlife species. In 1961, the Borough transferred Tower Hill to the State and in association with the Fisheries and Wildlife Department it became a State Game Reserve.

The vegetation of Tower Hill was originally a diverse collection of manna gum, Blackwood, Black Wattle, Swamp Gum and Drooping Sheoak. However, early settlers soon removed much of the vegetation. Since 1961, Tower Hill has been revegetated and is now home to koalas, kangaroos, emus and many bird species. A number of walks, picnic areas and public facilities are located within the Reserve.

The local cemetery is the Tower Hill Cemetery located on the South Eastern slopes of Tower Hill. The first recorded burials at the Tower Hill cemetery began in 1859. Charles Pye, an English recipient of the Victoria Cross, died in Kirkstall on 12 July 1876 and is buried at Tower Hill.

Within the cemetery, there is a marble column over the grave of William McLean. The epitaph, believed to have been written by Henry Lawson, reads: "Erected by his fellow unionists and admirers in memory of their comrade, William John McLean who was shot by a non-unionist at Grassmere, New South Wales, during the bush struggle in 1894 and who died 22 March, aged 26 years. A good son and faithful mate and a devoted unionist, Union is strength". The related events are known as the 1894 shearers' strike.

Nobel Prize-winning Australian biologist Sir Macfarlane Burnet's mother, née Hadassah Pollock Mackay, was born in Koroit in 1872. Her Glasgow schoolteacher father emigrated to Australia in the late 1850s and settled in Koroit. After Burnet's death in August 1985, he was buried at the local cemetery.

== Amenities ==
The Koroit police station was established on Commercial Road on 30 May 1867. The Koroit railway station began operations in 1889, with a brick building replacing an original timber structure in 1907. However, train services to Koroit ceased in September 1977 when the lines west from Dennington and north from Koroit were closed. The Koroit and District Memorial Health Services facility is on Mill Street providing health services including nursing home, adult day centre, district nursing service, and attached medical centre and incorporating child and adolescent mental health services. The facility began as a full service hospital in 1954 and was converted to the current use in 1994. The Koroit Library is located within the original Koroit Borough Chambers on High Street and is open for limited periods on Wednesday, Friday and Saturday.

Within the town, the Koroit Botanic Gardens form part of a large, central recreational area, and were designed by notable landscape architect, William Guilfoyle. The gardens were established in 1862 with an area of approximately three hectares in High Street. Koroit's War Memorial is located on the edge of the Botanic Gardens. In addition to The Olde Courthouse Inn, Koroit hosts two hotels in the main street, Commercial Road, the Commercial Hotel and Mickey Bourke's Koroit Hotel.

The Koroit and Tower Hill Butter and Cheese Factory Company Ltd was established in Koroit in the 1890s. An expanded facility continues today on the same site as part of the Murray Goulburn Co-operative Co. Limited. The facility is Australia's largest milk processing plant in terms of milk volume with an annual milk processing capacity of 800 million litres. From a three-hectare site on Commercial Road, the company runs a fleet of tankers collecting milk from suppliers throughout Western Victoria and South Australia. The site produces cream, buttermilk, anhydrous milk fat (AMF) and a wide variety of milk powders, for both local and international markets.

The former Tower Hill Lake National School in High Street near the Koroit Oval is the least altered of three surviving substantially intact examples of schools of the National School era existing in Victoria. Its design is unusual in that it is built to an H-shaped plan with the classrooms flanking the teacher's residence. It is significant to the Koroit community as its oldest building, having been constructed in the same year that the township was surveyed (1857), and was the venue for the first election and the early meetings of the Koroit Borough Council following a break away from the Belfast Shire in 1870.

== Recreation ==
The annual Lake School of Celtic Music, Song and Dance by the Lake School Committee subcommittee of the Koroit Community Association takes place in January. The Koroit to Warrnambool Half Marathon takes place in August of each year. The Koroit Agricultural Show takes place annually in November. The Koroit Irish Festival is a celebration of Irish heritage via music. Live music is featured at the hotels whilst a hive of market activity and music emanates from over 100 stalls and six stages set up along the main street. The festival includes street performers, arts and crafts and a variety of children's activities and entertainment. The festival is held annually on the weekend prior to the first Thursday in May.

Koroit is at the centre of a recreational trail along a decommissioned railway line that ran between Warrnambool, Koroit and Port Fairy. The 30 km recreational trail starts at Lake Pertobe in Warrnambool, passes through fertile farmland to Koroit (with a connection to Tower Hill) and finishes at the fishing village of Port Fairy.

The town has an Australian rules football team, the Koroit Saints, playing in the Hampden Football League.

== Bibliography ==
- Harry Alan McCorkell (1970). A Green and Pleasant Land or The Story of Koroit, 1836–1970. The Koroit Sentinel. For a long period, Harry McCorkell was the Town Clerk for the Koroit Borough Council. There is a memorial tree to Harry McCorkell in the Koroit Botanic Gardens reading "This Medlar Tree Was Planted On 8th April 1984 As A Memorial To The Late Harry A McCorkell Who Has Kept The History Of Koroit Alive Through His Book A Green And Pleasant Land".
- Anita Brady (1992). A Centenary History of Tower Hill. Department of Conservation and Natural Resources, Victoria.
- Henry Handel Richardson (1998). The Fortunes of Richard Mahony. Penguin Books.
- Henry Handel Richardson (2005). Myself When Young. Kessinger Publishing.
