= Eastern Maar =

Group of Aboriginal Australian peoples

The Eastern Maar people are a group of Aboriginal Australian peoples whose traditional lands are in the south-western part of the state of Victoria, Australia. It is a name adopted by a number of Aboriginal Victorian groups who identify as Maar, including Eastern Gunditjmara, Tjap Wurrung, Peek Whurrong, Kirrae Whurrung, Kuurn Kopan Noot and/or Yarro waetch (Tooram Tribe) people. The word "Maar" means "the people".

The Eastern Maar people are represented by the Eastern Maar Aboriginal Corporation (EMAC), a Registered Native Title Body Corporate (RNTBC).

In July 2011 the Eastern Maar and Gunditjmara peoples were recognised as the native title holders for an area in south-west Victoria between the Shaw and Eumeralla Rivers, and from Yambuk in the south, to beyond Lake Linlithgow in the north.

EMAC is negotiating a Recognition and Settlement Agreement with the Victorian Government for the area of Stawell south-west of Horsham and Ararat roads. The boundary of the agreement is under negotiation.
