= Shire of Belfast =

Coordinates: 38°18′S 142°11′E

Shire of Belfast Victoria
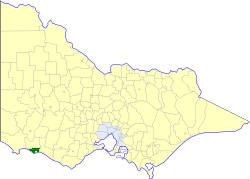
- Location in Victoria
- The Shire of Belfast as at its dissolution in 1994
- Population: 1,470 (1992)
  - Density: 0.2832/km^{2} (0.734/sq mi)
- Established: 1853
- Area: 5,190 km^{2} (2,003.9 sq mi)
- Council seat: Port Fairy
- Region: Barwon South West
- County: Villiers, Normanby
LGAs around Shire of Belfast:
Heywood	Minhamite	Warrnambool
Southern Ocean	Shire of Belfast	Warrnambool
Southern Ocean	Southern Ocean	Southern Ocean

The Shire of Belfast was a local government area about 290 kilometres (180 mi) west-southwest of Melbourne, the state capital of Victoria, Australia. The shire covered an area of 5,190 square kilometres (2,003.9 sq mi), and existed from 1853 until 1994.

== History ==
Belfast was first incorporated as a road district on 29 June 1853, and became a shire on 8 December 1863.

The shire contained no sizeable towns; the municipal office was in Port Fairy, next door to the Borough of Port Fairy's offices. In 1992 the shire employed 13 full-time equivalent staff, one of the smallest municipal workforces in Victoria.

On 23 September 1994, the Shire of Belfast was abolished, and along with the Borough of Port Fairy, the Shires of Minhamite and Mortlake, and parts of the Shires of Dundas, Mount Rouse, Warrnambool and the Tower Hill State Game Reserve, was merged into the newly created Shire of Moyne.

== Wards ==
The Shire of Belfast was divided into three ridings, each of which elected three councillors:

- Kirkstall Riding
- Moyne Riding
- Yambuk Riding

== Towns and localities ==
- Codrington
- Crossley
- Killarney
- Kirkstall
- Rosebrook
- St Helens
- Toolong
- Tyrendarra East
- Yambuk

== Population ==
Year	Population
1954	1,949
1958	1,970*
1961	1,917
1966	1,855
1971	1,643
1976	1,638
1981	1,503
1986	1,435
1991	1,412

* Estimate in the 1958 Victorian Year Book.
