= Threlfall =

Threlfall is a surname. Notable people with the surname include:

- David Threlfall (born 1953), English actor
- Dick Threlfall (1916–1994), English footballer
- Edward Threlfall, English footballer in the 1900s
- George Threlfall (engineer) (1819–1897), English-born Australian engineer and entrepreneur
- George Threlfall (footballer) (1899–1988), Australian rules footballer
- Jeanette Threlfall (1821–1880), English hymnwriter, religious poet
- Mary Threlfall (1910–1996), Australian nurse
- Philip Threlfall (born 1967), English cricketer
- Sir Richard Threlfall (1861–1932), English chemist and engineer in Australia
- Robbie Threlfall (born 1988), English footballer
- T. R. Threlfall (1852–after 1932), English trade unionist and politician
- Wilf Threlfall (1906–1988), English footballer
- William Threlfall (1888–1949), German mathematician
