= John Eddington =

English pioneer (1798–1873)

Captain John Eddington (1798 – 15 October 1873 Late Captain HM’s 1st Royals) was an English-born pioneer of the district surrounding Ballangeich, Victoria, now in the County of Villiers in Australia.

== Biography ==
Captain John Eddington, together with his wife Ann Elizabeth and two sons and one daughter sailed from Greenock, Scotland, as assisted immigrants, on the Ariadne on 6 Apr 1839 arriving in Victoria (then part of the Colony of New South Wales) on 20 September 1839. Two sons had been killed in the Crimean War. Another son, Henry Graham Eddington (1837-1934) was a Shire of Warrnambool councillor (1864–65) and died at the age of 97.

They settled on the Loddon River initially where the town of Eddington, Victoria is today.

On Wednesday 6 February 1840 he purchased at auction 968 acres of land at Barrabool on the outskirts of Geelong just north of Waurn Ponds Creek for 18s 6d an acre.

He established the Ballangeich Run in 1841. He selected the property in 1840-41 and arrived there in 1842, establishing what is the Ballangeich Station of today. By 1872 he had acquired freehold to several allotments totalling over 2,000 acres and the north-west corner of Ballangeich following the 1869 Selection Act. A large gum tree which stands on the banks of the Hopkins River was originally used by the women folk as a wash-house, stones being placed down to the water’s edge for their convenience in performing their domestic duties.

He decided to swap portion of his property and an old homestead with George Threlfall who had property in Ballarat. He was a member of Mortlake Shire Council for many years and was replaced by Mr Threlfall.

The old station has a private cemetery in which many of the old pioneers have been laid to rest. At the time that Ballangeich was thrown open for selection, someone selected this piece of land known as "The Groves" on the bank of the Hopkins River. On hearing of this Captain Eddington started off on horseback – at night – to lodge a petition that it be declared a cemetery. The letter signed by the superintendent Charles La Trobe, made the necessary grant dated 1848.

Ballangeich was named by Captain Eddington after the Pass of Ballangeich below Stirling Castle where he had played in his boyhood.

In earlier times the aborigines were very numerous in the neighbourhood, but there was seldom any trouble with them except for the occasional killing of cattle for food.
