= Borough of Port Fairy =

Coordinates: 38°22′S 142°14′E

Borough of Port Fairy Victoria
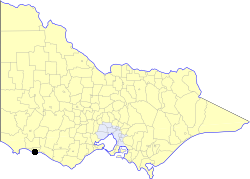
- Location in Victoria
- The Borough of Port Fairy as at its dissolution in 1994
- Population: 2,680 (1992)
  - Density: 117.96/km^{2} (305.5/sq mi)
- Established: 1856
- Area: 22.72 km^{2} (8.8 sq mi)
- Council seat: Port Fairy
- Region: Barwon South West
- County: Normanby

The Borough of Port Fairy was a local government area about 290 kilometres (180 mi) west-southwest of Melbourne, the state capital of Victoria, Australia. The borough covered an area of 22.72 square kilometres (8.8 sq mi), and existed from 1856 until 1994. Its area was surrounded by the Shire of Belfast and the Southern Ocean.

== History ==
Port Fairy was incorporated as the Belfast Municipal District on 1 July 1856, becoming a borough on 1 October 1863. On 27 May 1887, it was renamed Port Fairy.

On 23 September 1994, the Borough of Port Fairy was abolished, and was amalgamated with the Shires of Belfast and Minhamite, and parts of the Shires of Dundas, Mortlake, Mount Rouse, Warrnambool and the Tower Hill Reserve, to create the Shire of Moyne.

=== Wards ===
The Borough of Port Fairy was not subdivided into wards, and the seven councillors represented the entire area.

== Population ==
Year	Population
1954	2,265
1958	2,520*
1961	2,426
1966	2,577
1971	2,427
1976	2,399
1981	2,276
1986	2,504
1991	2,467

* Estimate in the 1958 Victorian Year Book.
