= Shire of Minhamite =

Shire of Minhamite Victoria
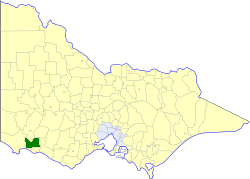
- Location in Victoria
- The Shire of Minhamite as at its dissolution in 1994
- Population: 1,870 (1992)
  - Density: 1.369/km^{2} (3.547/sq mi)
- Established: 1871
- Area: 1,365.62 km^{2} (527.3 sq mi)
- Council seat: Hawkesdale
- Region: Barwon South West
- County: Normanby, Villiers
LGAs around Shire of Minhamite:
Heywood	Dundas	Mount Rouse
Heywood	Shire of Minhamite	Warrnambool
Belfast	Belfast	Warrnambool

The Shire of Minhamite was a local government area about 270 kilometres (168 mi) west of Melbourne, the state capital of Victoria, Australia. The shire covered an area of 1,365.62 square kilometres (527.3 sq mi), and existed from 1871 until 1994.

== History ==
Minhamite, initially part of the Shire of Belfast, was incorporated as a shire on 13 January 1871.

On 23 September 1994, the Shire of Minhamite was abolished, and along with the Borough of Port Fairy, the Shire of Belfast, parts of the Shires of Dundas, Mortlake, Mount Rouse, Warrnambool, and the Tower Hill Reserve, was merged into the newly created Shire of Moyne.

=== Ridings ===
The Shire of Minhamite was not divided into ridings, and its nine councillors represented the entire shire.

== Towns and localities ==
- Bessiebelle
- Broadwater
- Hawkesdale
- Knebsworth
- Macarthur
- Minhamite*
- Orford
- St Helens
- Tarrone
- Warrong
- Willatook

* Council seat.

== Population ==
Year	Population
1954	2,520
1958	2,760*
1961	2,907
1966	2,824
1971	2,503
1976	2,229
1981	2,183
1986	1,950
1991	1,747

* Estimate in the 1958 Victorian Year Book.
