= Shire of Mortlake =

Coordinates: 38°04′S 142°48′E

Shire of Mortlake Victoria
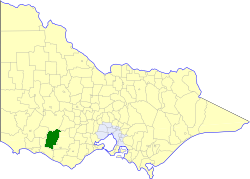
- Location in Victoria
- The Shire of Mortlake as at its dissolution in 1994
- Population: 3,070 (1992)
  - Density: 1.4366/km^{2} (3.721/sq mi)
- Established: 1860
- Area: 2,137 km^{2} (825.1 sq mi)
- Council seat: Mortlake
- Region: Barwon South West
- County: Hampden, Villiers
LGAs around Shire of Mortlake:
| Mount Rouse | Ararat | Ripon |
| Warrnambool | Shire of Mortlake | Hampden |
| Warrnambool | Warrnambool | Heytesbury |

The Shire of Mortlake was a local government area about 220 kilometres (137 mi) west of Melbourne, the state capital of Victoria, Australia. The shire covered an area of 2,137 square kilometres (825.1 sq mi), and existed from 1860 until 1994.

== History ==
Mortlake was incorporated as a road district on 20 July 1860, and became a shire on 26 January 1864.

On 23 September 1994, the Shire of Mortlake was abolished, and along with the Borough of Port Fairy, the Shires of Belfast and Minhamite, parts of the Shires of Dundas, Mount Rouse, Warrnambool, and the Tower Hill Reserve, was merged into the newly created Shire of Moyne.

== Wards ==
The Shire of Mortlake was divided into four ridings on 7 June 1978, each of which elected three councillors:

- Ballangeich Riding
- Darlington Riding
- Mortlake Riding
- Woorndoo Riding

== Towns and localities ==
- Ballangeich
- Darlington
- Dundonnell
- Ellerslie
- Hexham
- Kolora
- Mortlake*
- The Sisters
- Woorndoo

* Council seat.

== Population ==
| Year | Population |
|---|---|
| 1954 | 4,060 |
| 1958 | 4,350* |
| 1961 | 4,627 |
| 1966 | 4,404 |
| 1971 | 4,073 |
| 1976 | 3,728 |
| 1981 | 3,461 |
| 1986 | 3,125 |
| 1991 | 3,002 |

* Estimate in the 1958 Victorian Year Book.
