= Borough of Koroit =

- Local government area
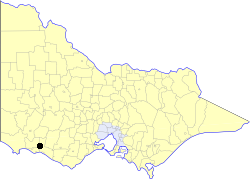
- Location in Victoria

- Interactive map of Borough of Koroit
- Country: Australia
- State: Victoria
- Region: Barwon South West
- Established: 1870
- Council seat: Koroit

Area
  - Total: 23.07 km^{2} (8.91 sq mi)

Population
  - Total: 1,500 (1986)
  - Density: 65.0/km^{2} (168/sq mi)
- County: Villiers

The Borough of Koroit was a local government area about 18 kilometres (11 mi) northwest of Warrnambool in western Victoria, Australia. The borough covered an area of 23.07 square kilometres (8.9 sq mi) immediately to the north of the Tower Hill State Game Reserve, and existed from 1870 until 1985.

== History ==
It was first incorporated on 7 October 1870. Its boundaries remained unchanged throughout its existence.

=== Merger with Shire of Warrnambool ===
Unlike other boroughs in Victoria, the Borough of Koroit was centred on a relatively small settlement. Numerous proposals were made for its amalgamation with either the Shire of Belfast to the west or the Shire of Warrnambool to the east.

By the 1980s, the Borough was in a difficult financial situation, with a declining and aging population and a limited rate base. The Borough's workforce struggled to serve the council and community – the Borough's town clerk, engineer and clerical staff all worked part-time, and the Council depot relied on equipment borrowed from the Shire of Warrnambool to supplement its own.

In October 1983 a poll of ratepayers took place, with results as follows:

Option	Votes
Remain as a separate Borough	184
Amalgamate with Shire of Belfast	41
Amalgamate with Shire of Warrnambool	534
Total formal votes	759

At a 1984 public hearing, the councils of both Koroit and the Shire of Warrnambool expressed their support for amalgamation, on the condition that Koroit be admitted to the Shire as a separate riding. The hearing panel commented that the "calm, rational attitude to the proposal, as exhibited by both municipalities, was rather unique", although the Shire warned that they "would not like this unification to be seen as a catalyst for further amalgamation of municipalities in the area".

On 1 June 1985, the borough was united with the Shire of Warrnambool as the Koroit Riding. This was Victoria's first municipal amalgamation since 1966, and it was to be the last before the large-scale reforms of the mid-1990s.

== Population ==
Year	Population
1954	1,401
1958	1,430*
1961	1,466
1966	1,416
1971	1,429
1976	1,408
1981	1,469
1986	1,500*

* Estimates in 1958 and 1988 Victorian Year Books.
