= George Threlfall =

George Threlfall may refer to:

- George Threlfall (footballer)
- George Threlfall (engineer)
