= City of Hamilton =

City of Hamilton may refer to:

The Bermuda Islands UK Overseas Territory

- Hamilton, Bermuda

Canada:

- Hamilton, Ontario

United States:

- Hamilton, Alabama
- Hamilton, Georgia
- Hamilton, Illinois
- Hamilton, Iowa
- Hamilton, Kansas
- Hamilton, Missouri
- Hamilton, Montana
- Hamilton, North Dakota
- Hamilton, Ohio
- Hamilton, Texas
- Hamilton City, California

Australia:

- Hamilton, Victoria
- City of Hamilton (Victoria), the former local government administering Hamilton.
