= List of acts of the Parliament of Victoria from 1892 =

This is a list of acts of the Parliament of Victoria, Australia for the year 1892.

== 1892 ==
Short title, or popular name	Citation	Royal assent
Long title
	56 Vict. No. 1253	29 July 1892
An Act to apply out of the Consolidated Revenue the sum of Forty-eight thousand and sixty-four pounds to the service of the year One thousand eight hundred and ninety-one and ninety-two, and the sum of One million five hundred and ninety-nine thousand three hundred and sixty-six pounds to the service of the year One thousand eight hundred and ninety-two and ninety-three.
	56 Vict. No. 1254	29 July 1892
An Act to alter the date of the redemption of Stock to be issued pursuant to the Victorian Stock Act 1891, (Note: Victorian Stock Act 1891 (55 Vict. No. 1217)) and also to alter the dates for the payment of dividends thereon.
Coal Mines Railway Construction Amendment Act 1892	56 Vict. No. 1255	4 August 1892
An Act to amend the Coal Mines Railway Construction Act 1891. (Note: Coal Mines Railway Construction Act 1891 (55 Vict. No. 1240))
Registration of Firms Act 1892 (repealed)	56 Vict. No. 1256	1 September 1892
An Act to provide for the Registration of Firms. (Repealed by Partnership Act 1891 (55 Vict. No. 1222))
Beer Duty Act 1892	56 Vict. No. 1257	1 September 1892
An Act to impose a Duty upon Beer.
	56 Vict. No. 1258	8 September 1892
An Act to alter the Rate of certain Postage.
Royal Insurance Company's Act 1892	56 Vict. No. 1259	26 September 1892
An Act to define and extend the objects of The Royal Insurance Company (registered in Victoria under The Life Assurance Companies Act 1873) (Note: Life Assurance Companies Act 1873 (37 Vict. No. 474)) and to provide for the transfer to that company of the business of The Queen Insurance Company (a company also registered in Victoria under the said Act).
Beulah and Hopetoun Railway Act 1892	56 Vict. No. 1260	26 September 1892
An Act to ratify an Agreement entered into with regard to the construction of a line of railway from Beulah to Hopetoun.
Administration and Probate Act 1892 (repealed)	56 Vict. No. 1261	3 October 1892
An Act to amend the Law relating to Administration and Probate. (Repealed by Administration and Probate Act 1915 (6 Geo. V. No. 2611))
Oakleigh Shire Offices Act 1892 (repealed)	56 Vict. No. 1262	3 October 1892
An Act to authorize the President Councillors and Ratepayers of the Shire of Oakleigh to sell certain lands at Oakleigh. (Repealed by Statute Law Revision Act 1984 (No. 10087))
Mines Act 1892	56 Vict. No. 1263	3 October 1892
An Act to amend the Mines Act 1890. (Note: Mines Act 1890 (54 Vict. No. 1120))
Municipal Overdrafts (Indemnity) Act 1892	56 Vict. No. 1264	13 October 1892
An Act to indemnify the Councillors of various Municipalities for Borrowing Moneys by Overdrafts on Bankers for the purposes of their Municipalities contrary to the provisions of the Local Government Act 1890 (Note: Local Government Act 1890 (54 Vict. No. 1112)) and for other purposes.
	56 Vict. No. 1265	13 October 1892
An Act to apply out of the Consolidated Revenue the sum of Nine hundred and fifty-six thousand nine hundred and thirty pounds to the service of the year One thousand eight hundred and ninety-two and ninety-three.
Agricultural and other Grants Act 1892	56 Vict. No. 1266	24 October 1892
An Act relating to certain Agricultural and other Grants.
Dandenong Lands Act 1892	56 Vict. No. 1267	21 November 1892
An Act to authorize the President Councillors and Ratepayers of the Shire of Dandenong to sell certain Crown lands reserved for market and other purposes in the Township of Dandenong.
Local Government Act 1892 (repealed)	56 Vict. No. 1268	21 November 1892
An Act relating to the Valuation of Rateable Property in Municipal Districts and also to Improvement Rates. (Repealed by Local Government Act 1903 (3 Edw. VII. No. 1893))
Companies Act Amendment Act 1892	56 Vict. No. 1269	1 December 1892
An Act to amend the Companies Act 1890. (Note: Companies Act 1890 (54 Vict. No. 1074))
	56 Vict. No. 1270	5 December 1892
An Act relating to State School Teachers. (Repealed by Public Service Act 1915 (6 Geo. V. No. 2713))
Tower Hill National Park Act 1892	56 Vict. No. 1271	5 December 1892
An Act to provide for the Establishment and Management of a National Park at Tower Hill near Koroit.
	56 Vict. No. 1272	5 December 1892
An Act to remove doubts as to the effect of Section three hundred and six of the Local Government Act 1890 in its application to the City of Melbourne.
Warracknabeal and Donald Railways Construction Act 1892	56 Vict. No. 1273	5 December 1892
An Act to authorize the Construction of State Lines of Railway from Warracknabeal and Donald.
Stamps Act 1892 (repealed)	56 Vict. No. 1274	5 December 1892
An Act to amend the Stamps Act 1890. (Note: Stamps Act 1890 (54 Vict. No. 1140)) (Repealed by Stamps Act 1915 (6 Geo. V. No. 2728))
Legal Profession Practice Act 1892 (repealed)	56 Vict. No. 1275	5 December 1892
An Act to facilitate the admission of certain English Scottish and Irish Barristers and Solicitors to practise as Barristers and Solicitors in Victoria. (Repealed by Legal Profession Practice Act 1915 (6 Geo. V. No. 2681))
Retrenchment Act 1892	56 Vict. No. 1276	7 December 1892
An Act providing for the Reduction of Public Salaries for the Financial Year ending on the thirtieth day of June One thousand eight hundred and ninety-three.
Wyndham Shire Hall Act 1892 (repealed)	56 Vict. No. 1277	19 December 1892
An Act to enable the President Councillors and Ratepayers of the Shire of Wyndham to sell and convey certain lands at Werribee and to apply the proceeds of such sale towards the cost of erecting a Shire Hall and Municipal Offices elsewhere within the said shire. (Repealed by Werribee Shire Hall Act 1983 (No. 9985))
Melbourne Tramways Trust Amendment Act 1892	56 Vict. No. 1278	19 December 1892
An Act to amend various Acts of Parliament relating to The Melbourne Tramways Trust and to more fully define the powers of the said Trust thereunder.
Cape Patterson and Kilcunda Junction Railway Act Further Amendment Act 1892	56 Vict. No. 1279	19 December 1892
An Act to amend and continue an Act intituled "An Act to authorize the construction of the Cape Patterson and Kilcunda Junction Railway and for other purposes." (Note: Cape Patterson and Kilcunda Junction Railway Act 1888 (52 Vict. No. 980))
Livery and Agistment Act 1892 (repealed)	56 Vict. No. 1280	23 December 1892
An Act for the better Protection of Livery-stable Keepers and Agisters of Cattle, and for other purposes. (Repealed by Livery and Agistment Act 1915 (6 Geo. V. No. 2685))
	56 Vict. No. 1281	23 December 1892
An Act to amend the Mines Act Amendment Act 1890 (Note: Mines Act Amendment Act 1890 (54 Vict. No. 1189)) and the Mines Act 1891. (Note: Mines Act 1891 (55 Vict. No. 1215))
	56 Vict. No. 1282	23 December 1892
An Act to apply out of the Consolidated Revenue the sum of Four hundred and seventy-three thousand four hundred and seventy-four pounds to the service of the year One thousand eight hundred and ninety-two and ninety-three.
Treasury Bonds Act 1892	56 Vict. No. 1283	23 December 1892
An Act to authorize the issue of Treasury Bonds.

== Sources ==
- "1892 Victorian Historical Acts". AustLII.
