= Shire of Warrnambool =

Coordinates: 38°32′S 142°49′E

Shire of Warrnambool Victoria
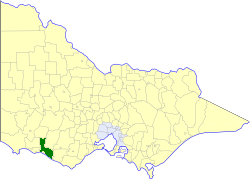
- Location in Victoria
- The Shire of Warrnambool as at its dissolution in 1994
- Population: 8,940 (1992)
  - Density: 5.570/km^{2} (14.426/sq mi)
- Established: 1854
- Area: 1,605 km^{2} (619.7 sq mi)
- Council seat: Warrnambool
- Region: Barwon South West
- County: Villiers, Heytesbury, Hampden
LGAs around Shire of Warrnambool:
Mount Rouse	Mortlake	Hampden
Minhamite	Shire of Warrnambool	Heytesbury
Belfast	Southern Ocean	Southern Ocean

The Shire of Warrnambool was a local government area located about 260 kilometres (162 mi) west-southwest of Melbourne, the state capital of Victoria, Australia. The shire covered an area of 1,605 square kilometres (619.7 sq mi), and existed from 1854 until 1994.

The Shire of Warrnambool took in the rural areas around the regional city of Warrnambool, including the small towns of Allansford, Woolsthorpe, Panmure, Peterborough and (after 1985) Koroit. Warrnambool's urban area was managed by a separate entity, the City of Warrnambool.

== History ==
Warrnambool was first incorporated as a road district on 11 July 1854, and became a shire on 31 December 1863.

=== Merger with Koroit ===
On 1 June 1985, the Borough of Koroit was merged into the Shire of Warrnambool, as an additional riding known as the Koroit Riding.

=== Abolition ===
On 23 September 1994, the Shire of Warrnambool was abolished, and along with the Borough of Port Fairy, the Shires of Belfast and Minhamite, parts of the Shires of Dundas, Mortlake, Mount Rouse and the Tower Hill Reserve, was merged into the newly created Shire of Moyne.

== Wards ==
The Shire of Warrnambool was divided into four ridings, each of which elected three councillors:

- North Riding
- South Riding
- East Riding
- Koroit Riding

== Population ==
Year	Population
1954	8,920
1958	7,910*
1961	7,610
1966	7,492
1971	6,859
1976	6,753
1981	6,517
1986	6,571
1991	8,452
2016	34,618

* Estimate in the 1958 Victorian Year Book.
