= B120 =

B120 may refer to:

- State route B120 or Hopkins Highway, a highway in south-western Victoria, Australia
- B120 series Sunny Truck, a truck by Nissan
