= William Shaw (engineer) =

Australian engineer and ironfounder

William Henry Shaw (1830–1896) was an Irish-born Australian engineer and ironfounder who founded the company that later became the Phoenix Foundry.

== Biography ==
William Shaw, son of James Smith Shaw was born in Belfast, Ireland on 27 July 1830. He trained as an engineer in England before sailing for Australia in 1851. He managed the Phoenix Foundry from 1870-1896.

He arrived in Ballarat in 1853. After mining for a short period he joined the business named Carter & Co in Armstrong Street, Ballarat in 1854 together with George Threlfall, moulder Robert Holden and engine smith Richard Carter, making and repairing picks and tools for miners and mining machinery. George Threlfall left this business in January 1858. Richard Carter and Robert Holden left the business, now named Richard Carter & Co. on 5 June 1873. The business was later renamed the Phoenix Foundry Company after more shareholders invested in the business. Robert Holden became one of these shareholders.

On 21 November 1863 he was named as a shareholder in the newly formed Rising Star Gold Mining Company (Limited).

He died on 24 August 1896, at the age of 66 years, after a lingering illness, suffering from a complication of disorders. He was a justice of the peace and was regarded as one of the most capable engineers in Australia. Three hundred locomotives running on Victorian lines were manufactured under his supervision. He left a widow and seven sons and four daughters. His son, W. H. Shaw, junior, worked at the Phoenix Foundry. Another son, J. C. Shaw was a barrister and solicitor in Ballarat.

On 19 September 1906 The Phoenix Foundry Company of Ballarat ceased to exist with the sale of the business being completed to Messrs Cameron and Sutherland. The sale price was not disclosed, but was understood to exceed £25,000.
