= Warrong =

- Town
- Coordinates: 38°12′S 142°22′E
- Country: Australia
- State: Victoria
- LGA: Shire of Moyne (Formally Shire of Minhamite)

Population
  - Total: 77 (SAL 2021)
- Postcode: 3283

Warrong was a town, now a locality, originally located in the Shire of Minhamite which is now a part of Moyne Shire located South Western Victoria.

The town is in the County of Villiers and the Post Code is 3283. The local economy is largely agriculture, primarily based on sheep and cattle, and the nearest large town is Warrnambool 30 km to the south.
