= Shire of Wannon =

Coordinates: 37°36′S 141°42′E

Shire of Wannon Victoria
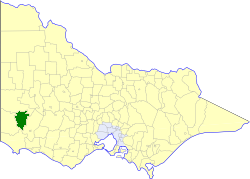
- Location in Victoria
- The Shire of Wannon as at its dissolution in 1994
- Population: 2,750 (1992)
  - Density: 1.3910/km^{2} (3.603/sq mi)
- Established: 1872
- Area: 1,977 km^{2} (763.3 sq mi)
- Council seat: Coleraine
- Region: Barwon South West
- County: Dundas
LGAs around Shire of Wannon:
Kowree	Kowree	Kowree
Glenelg	Shire of Wannon	Dundas
Glenelg	Heywood	Dundas

The Shire of Wannon was a local government area about 330 kilometres (205 mi) west of Melbourne, the state capital of Victoria, Australia. The shire covered an area of 1,977 square kilometres (763.3 sq mi), and existed from 1872 until 1994.

== History ==
Wannon was first incorporated as a shire on 15 March 1872.

On 23 September 1994, the Shire of Wannon was abolished, and along with the City of Hamilton and parts of the Shires of Mount Rouse and Dundas, was merged into the newly created Shire of Southern Grampians.

== Wards ==
Wannon was divided into three ridings, each of which elected three councillors:

- Balmoral Riding
- Coleraine Riding
- Konongwootong Riding

== Towns and localities ==
- Coleraine*
- Balmoral

The shire also contained the localities of Brit Brit, Carapook, Englefield, Gringegalgona, Hilgay, Konongwootong, Melville Forest, Moree, Muntham, Nareen, Parkwood, Pigeon Ponds, Tarrenlea, Tarrayoukyan, Vasey and Wootong Vale.

* Council seat.

== Population ==
Year	Population
1954	3,949
1958	4,200*
1961	4,154
1966	4,060
1971	3,646
1976	3,363
1981	3,093
1986	2,856
1991	2,685

* Estimate in the 1958 Victorian Year Book.
