= Hopkins Highway =

Highway in Victoria

Hopkins Highway Victoria
- Coordinates: 38°4′S 142°48′E (North end); 38°23′S 142°29′E (South end)

General information
- Type: Highway
- Length: 48.5 km (30 mi)
- Gazetted: September 1914 (as Main Road); December 1990 (as State Highway)
- Route number(s): B120 (1998–present)
- Former route number: State Route 104 (1990–1998)

Major junctions
- North end: Hamilton Highway; Mortlake, Victoria
- Princes Highway
- South end: Banyan Street; Warrnambool, Victoria

Location(s)
- Major settlements: Ellerslie, Purnim, Bushfield

Highway system
- Highways in Australia; National Highway • Freeways in Australia; Highways in Victoria

Hopkins Highway is a short highway in south-western Victoria, Australia, serving to link Hamilton Highway at Mortlake with Princes Highway (and the western end of Great Ocean Road nearby) at the port city of Warrnambool. It is named after the Hopkins River, with which it runs in close proximity.

== Route ==
Hopkins Highway commences at the intersection with Hamilton Highway on the western edge of Mortlake and runs in a south-westerly direction as a dual-lane, single-carriageway road, mostly following the course of Hopkins River, crossing it in Ellerslie. It eventually terminates at the intersection with Princes Highway in the centre of Warrnambool.

== History ==
Within Victoria, the passing of the Country Roads Act 1912 through the Parliament of Victoria provided for the establishment of the Country Roads Board (later VicRoads) and their ability to declare Main Roads, taking responsibility for the management, construction and care of the state's major roads from local municipalities. Mortlake-Warrnambool Road was declared a Main Road from Mortlake to Warrnambool.

The passing of the Transport Act 1983 (itself an evolution from the original Highways and Vehicles Act 1924) provided for the declaration of State Highways, roads two-thirds financed by the State government through the Road Construction Authority (later VicRoads). Hopkins Highway was declared a State Highway in December 1990, from Mortlake to Warrnambool, subsuming the original declaration of Mortlake-Warrnambool Road as a Main Road.

Hopkins Highway was signed as State Route 104 between Mortlake and Warrnambool in 1990; with Victoria's conversion to the newer alphanumeric system in the late 1990s, it was replaced by route B120.

The passing of the Road Management Act 2004 granted the responsibility of overall management and development of Victoria's major arterial roads to VicRoads: in 2004, VicRoads re-declared the road as Hopkins Highway (Arterial #6010) between Hamilton Highway in Mortlake and Princes Highway at Warrnambool.

=== Upgrades ===
- 1867 – Ellerslie Bridge, a large timber and masonry bridge over the Hopkins River at Ellerslie, at the crossing place then known as Letts Ford; it is Victoria's second-oldest positively dated timber-beam road bridge, originally opened 30 May 1867
- 1967 – Ellerslie Bridge replacement, a 271 feet (83 m) five-span prestressed concrete beam and reinforced concrete bridge, constructed adjacent to, and replacing, the timber version at 100 years old

== Major intersections ==
LGA	Location	km	mi	Destinations	Notes
Moyne	Mortlake	0.0	0.0	Hamilton Highway (B140) – Geelong, Hamilton	Northern terminus of highway and route B120
Moyne	Ellerslie	12.8	8.0	Ellerslie–Panmure Road – Panmure	
Hopkins River		13.1	8.1	Ellerslie Bridge	
Moyne	Ballangeich	16.9	10.5	Hexham–Ballangeich Road – Hexham	
Warrnambool	Bushfield	41.4	25.7	Bridge Road (C169) – Woodford	
Warrnambool	Warrnambool	48.5	30.1	Princes Highway (A1) – Portland, Geelong	
Warrnambool	Warrnambool	48.5	30.1	Banyan Street – Warrnambool	Southern terminus of highway and route B120
1.000 mi = 1.609 km; 1.000 km = 0.621 mi: Route transition

== See also ==
- Highways in Australia
- Highways in Victoria
