= Mary Threlfall =

Australian nurse

Mary Threlfall MBE

Personal details
- Born: Mary Josephine Threlfall; 25 December 1910 Colac, Victoria
- Died: 25 December 1996 (aged 86) Geelong, Victoria
- Parent(s): James Murtagh and Annie Constance (née Harney) Threlfall
- Occupation: Nurse

Mary Threlfall MBE (25 December 1910 – 25 December 1996) was an Australian nurse who became matron of Greenslopes Private Hospital in Queensland, Australia.

== Biography ==
Mary Threlfall MBE was born on 25 December 1910 at Colac, Victoria, Australia, the fourth child and second daughter of James Murtagh and Annie Constance (née Harney) Threlfall. She is the granddaughter of George Threlfall. She spent her childhood years at Bullock Swamp (Warrion) near the Red Rock. She was educated at St Brendan's School at Coragulac, gaining her merit certificate in 1925, and was taught by the Sisters of the Good Samaritan. After leaving school she worked for Dr Murray in Colac and then St Erin's Hospital in East Melbourne (corner of Fitzroy Street and Victoria Parade). She undertook general training at St Vincent's Hospital, Sydney. In 1947 she was transferred to the Concord Repatriation General Hospital, Sydney as relieving assistant matron. In 1951 she became Director of Nursing Services at the Repatriation General Hospital in Hobart. She spent three and a half years there before taking up a position as matron at the Repatriation General Hospital Greenslopes in Queensland. After retiring in 1970 she spent a short time in Queensland before moving to Highton, Geelong, Victoria.

She died on 25 December 1996 in Geelong, Victoria, Australia and is buried in the Geelong Eastern Cemetery.

== Awards ==
She was appointed a Member of the Order of the British Empire on 1 January 1965 for services to nursing.
