= Ellerslie, Victoria =

Ellerslie
- Town
- Coordinates: 38°8′57″S 142°41′7″E
- Country: Australia
- State: Victoria
- LGA: Shire of Moyne
- Location: 231.4 km (143.8 mi) SW of Melbourne; 36 km (22 mi) NE of Warrnambool; 25.8 km (16.0 mi) SW of Terang

Government
  - State electorate: Lowan
  - Federal division: Wannon

Population
  - Total: 157 (SAL 2021)
- Postcode: 3265

Ellerslie is a locality in western Victoria, Australia on the Hopkins Highway. The locality is in the Shire of Moyne local government area, in what is commonly known as the Western District.

== History ==
At the end of the 19th century, the place had a population of 140 inhabitants.

== Demographics ==
As of the 2021 Australian census, 157 people resided in Ellerslie, up from 147 in the 2016 census.

== Traditional ownership ==
The formally recognised traditional owners for the area in which Ellerslie sits are the Eastern Maar People who are represented by the Eastern Maar Aboriginal Corporation.

== Post office ==
Ellerslie post office opened on 1 February 1869 and closed on 31 December 1991.
