= Ballangeich =

- Town
- Coordinates: 38°13′08″S 142°39′28″E
- Country: Australia
- State: Victoria
- LGA: Shire of Moyne
- Location: 247 km (153 mi) W of Melbourne

Government
  - State electorate: South-West Coast
  - Federal division: Wannon

Population
  - Total: 71 (SAL 2021)
- Postcode: 3279

Ballangeich is a locality in western Victoria, Australia on the Hopkins Highway. The locality is in the Shire of Moyne local government area, in what is commonly known as the Western District. It sits approximately 247 kilometres (153 mi) west of the state capital, Melbourne.

== History ==
Ballangeich was named by Captain John Eddington after the Pass of Ballangeich below Stirling Castle where he had played in his boyhood. He established the Ballangeich Run in 1841. He selected the property in 1840-41 and arrived there in 1842, establishing what is the Ballangeich Station of today. By 1872 he had acquired freehold to several allotments totalling over 2,000 acres and the north-west corner of Ballangeich following the 1869 Selection Act.

The old station has a private cemetery in which many of the old pioneers have been laid to rest. At the time that Ballangeich was thrown open for selection, someone selected this piece of land known as "The Groves" on the bank of the Hopkins River. On hearing of this, Captain Eddington started off on horseback – at night – to lodge a petition that it be declared a cemetery. The letter signed by the superintendent Charles La Trobe, made the necessary grant dated 1848.

On 16 February 1983, one of the Ash Wednesday fires started in Ballangeich, destroying many homes, farm buildings and livestock. The cause was believed to be poorly maintained power lines.

== Governance ==
In local government, Ballangeich is covered by the Shire of Moyne. It was previously located in the Shire of Mortlake 1864 to 1994.

== Traditional ownership ==
The formally recognised traditional owners for the area in which Ballangeich sits are the Eastern Maar People who are represented by the Eastern Maar Aboriginal Corporation.

== Post offices ==
Ballangeich post office opened on 1 November 1868 and closed on 30 September 1957. A Ballangeich North post office was also open from 1909 until 1957.
