= Shire of Dundas (Victoria) =

Coordinates: 37°41′S 142°04′E

Shire of Dundas Victoria
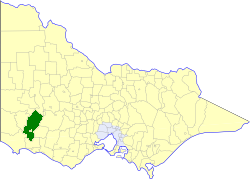
- Location in Victoria
- The Shire of Dundas as at its dissolution in 1994
- Population: 3,500 (1992)
  - Density: 1.010/km^{2} (2.62/sq mi)
- Established: 1857
- Area: 3,464.39 km^{2} (1,337.6 sq mi)
- Council seat: Hamilton
- Region: Barwon South West
- County: Dundas, Normanby, Villiers
LGAs around Shire of Dundas:
Kowree	Wimmera	Stawell
Wannon	Shire of Dundas	Ararat
Heywood	Minhamite	Mount Rouse

The Shire of Dundas was a local government area about 300 kilometres (186 mi) west of Melbourne, the state capital of Victoria, Australia. The shire covered an area of 3,464.39 square kilometres (1,337.6 sq mi), and existed from 1857 until 1994.

== History ==
Dundas was first incorporated as a road district on 4 August 1857, and became a shire on 8 December 1863.

On 23 September 1994, the Shire of Dundas was abolished, and along with the City of Hamilton, the Shire of Wannon and parts of the Shire of Mount Rouse, was merged into the newly created Shire of Southern Grampians. The Macarthur hinterland area was transferred into the newly created Shire of Moyne, administered from Port Fairy.

== Wards ==
The Shire of Dundas was divided into three ridings, each of which elected three councillors:

- South Riding
- East Riding
- West Riding

== Towns and localities ==
- Bochara
- Buckley Swamp
- Bulart
- Byaduk
- Cavendish
- Gatum
- Gazette
- Glenisla
- Karabeal
- Mirranatwa
- Mooralla
- Moutajup
- Strathkellar
- Tarrington
- Urangara
- Victoria Valley
- Wannon
- Warrabkook
- Warrayure
- Yatchaw
- Yulecart

== Population ==
Year	Population
1954	3,903
1958	4,100*
1961	4,072
1966	3,913
1971	3,667
1976	3,420
1981	3,478
1986	3,469
1991	3,402

* Estimate in the 1958 Victorian Year Book.
