= Shire of Mount Rouse =

Coordinates: 37°53′S 142°17′E

- Local government area
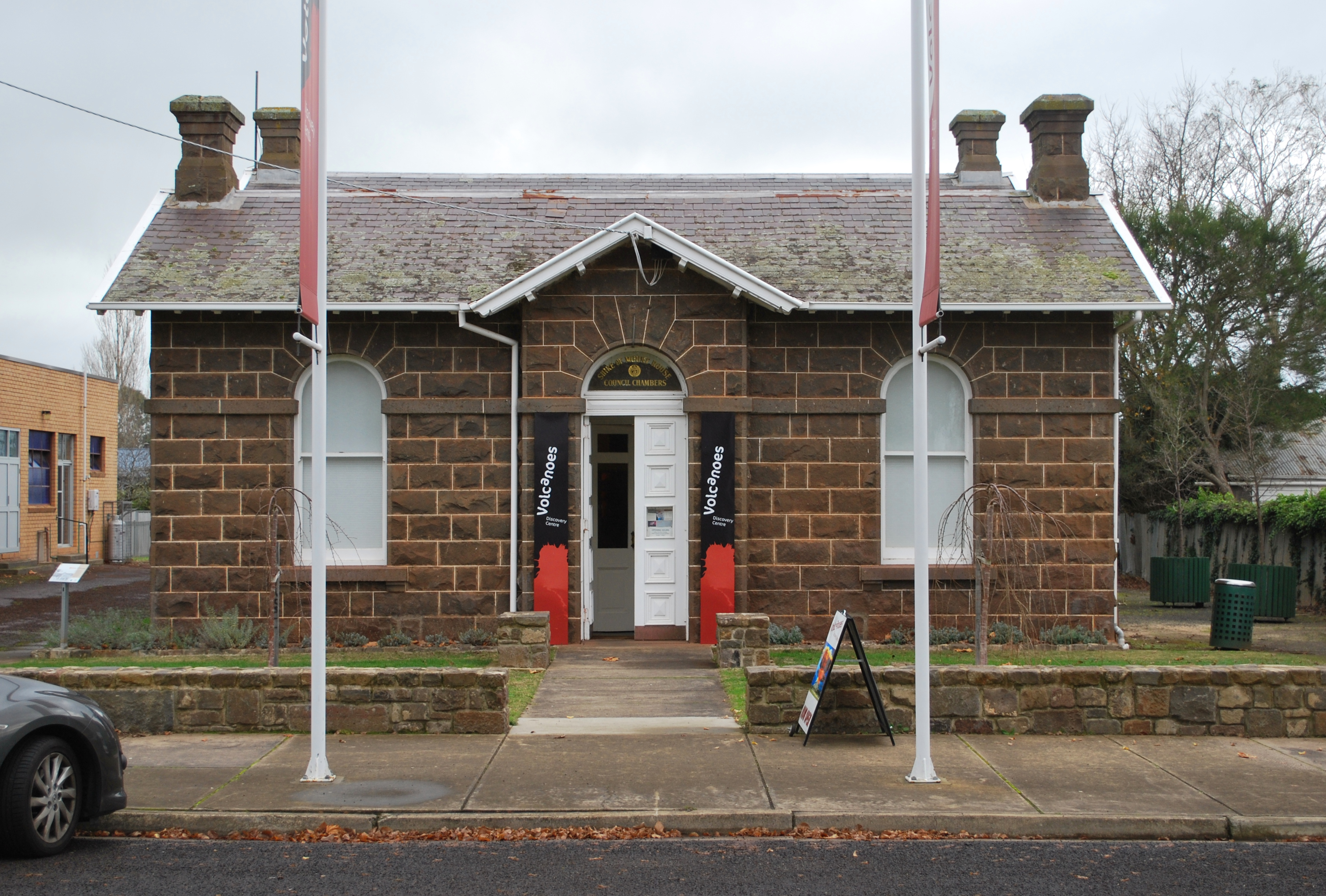
- Former council chambers in Penshurst

- The Shire of Mount Rouse as at its dissolution in 1994
- Country: Australia
- State: Victoria
- Region: Barwon South West
- Established: 1860
- Council seat: Penshurst

Area
  - Total: 1,407 km^{2} (543 sq mi)

Population
  - Total(s): 2,350 (1992)
  - Density: 1.670/km^{2} (4.326/sq mi)
- County: Villiers
LGAs around Shire of Mount Rouse
Dundas	Ararat	Ararat
Dundas	Shire of Mount Rouse	Mortlake
Minhamite	Warrnambool	Mortlake

The Shire of Mount Rouse was a local government area about 270 kilometres (168 mi) west of Melbourne, the state capital of Victoria, Australia. The shire covered an area of 1,407 square kilometres (543.2 sq mi), and existed from 1860 until 1994.

== History ==
Mount Rouse was incorporated as a road district on 2 October 1860, and became a shire on 26 January 1864.

On 23 September 1994, the Shire of Mount Rouse was abolished, and along with the City of Hamilton, the Shire of Wannon and parts of the Shire of Dundas, was merged into the newly created Shire of Southern Grampians.

== Ridings ==
Mount Rouse was divided into three ridings, each of which elected three councillors:

- Dunkeld Riding
- Glenthompson Riding
- Penshurst Riding

== Towns and localities ==
- Chatsworth
- Dunkeld
- Glenthompson
- Penshurst*
- Tabor

* Council seat.

== Population ==
Year	Population
1954	2,859
1958	3,010*
1961	3,056
1966	3,044
1971	2,693
1976	2,569
1981	2,474
1986	2,263
1991	2,250

* Estimate in the 1958 Victorian Year Book.
