= City of Hamilton (Victoria) =

Coordinates: 37°44′S 142°01′E

- Local government area
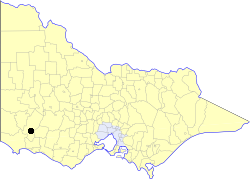
- Location in Victoria

- The City of Hamilton (Victoria) as at its dissolution in 1994
- Country: Australia
- State: Victoria
- Region: Barwon South West
- Established: 1859
- Council seat: Hamilton

Area
  - Total: 20.64 km^{2} (7.97 sq mi)

Population
  - Total: 10,180 (1992)
  - Density: 493.2/km^{2} (1,277.4/sq mi)
- County: Dundas, Normanby

The City of Hamilton was a local government area about 300 kilometres (186 mi) west of Melbourne, the state capital of Victoria, Australia. The city covered an area of 20.64 square kilometres (8.0 sq mi), and existed from 1859 until 1994. Its area was surrounded by the Shire of Dundas.

== History ==
Hamilton was first incorporated as a municipal district on 1 November 1859. It became a borough on 11 September 1863, and a town on 28 March 1928. It was proclaimed as a city on 22 November 1949.

On 23 September 1994, the City of Hamilton was abolished, and along with the Shire of Wannon and parts of the Shires of Dundas and Mount Rouse, was merged into the newly created Shire of Southern Grampians.

=== Wards ===
The City of Hamilton was not subdivided into wards, and its nine councillors represented the entire area.

== Population ==
Year	Population
1954	8,507
1958	9,280*
1961	9,495
1966	10,052
1971	9,673
1976	9,504
1981	9,751
1986	9,969
1991	9,753
1996	9,248
2006	9,379
2011	9,346
2016	9,974
2021	10,346

* Estimate in the 1958 Victorian Year Book.

== Education ==
=== Secondary schools ===
- Baimbridge Secondary School
- Monivae College
- Good Shepherd College
- Hamilton and Alexandra College

=== Primary schools ===
- St.Mary's primary school
- Good Shepherd College
- Hamilton and Alexandra College
- Gray Street Primary School
- George Street Primary School

=== Kindergartens ===
- Good Shepherd College
- Hamilton and Alexandra College

== Gallery ==
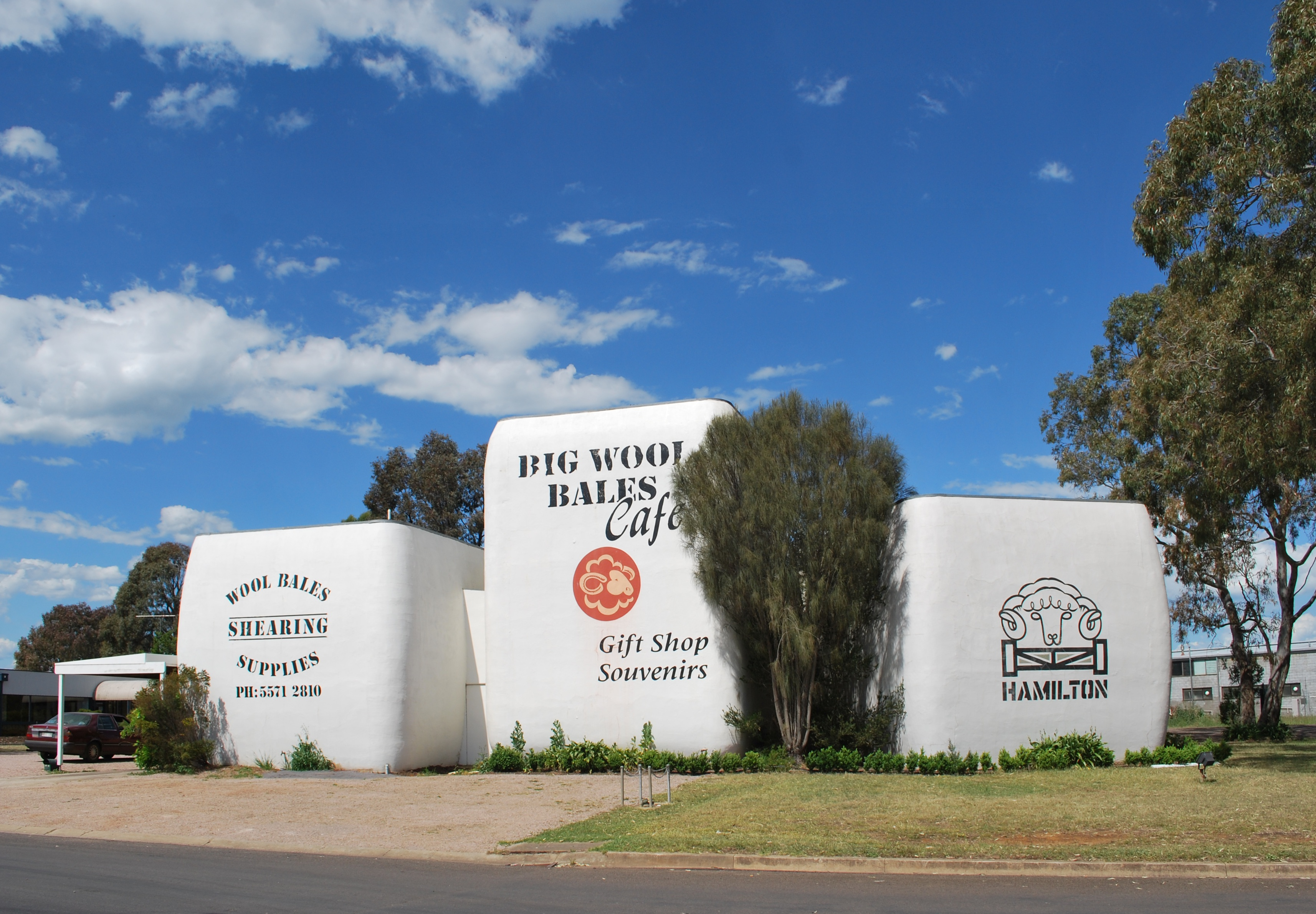
Hamilton Big Wool Bales

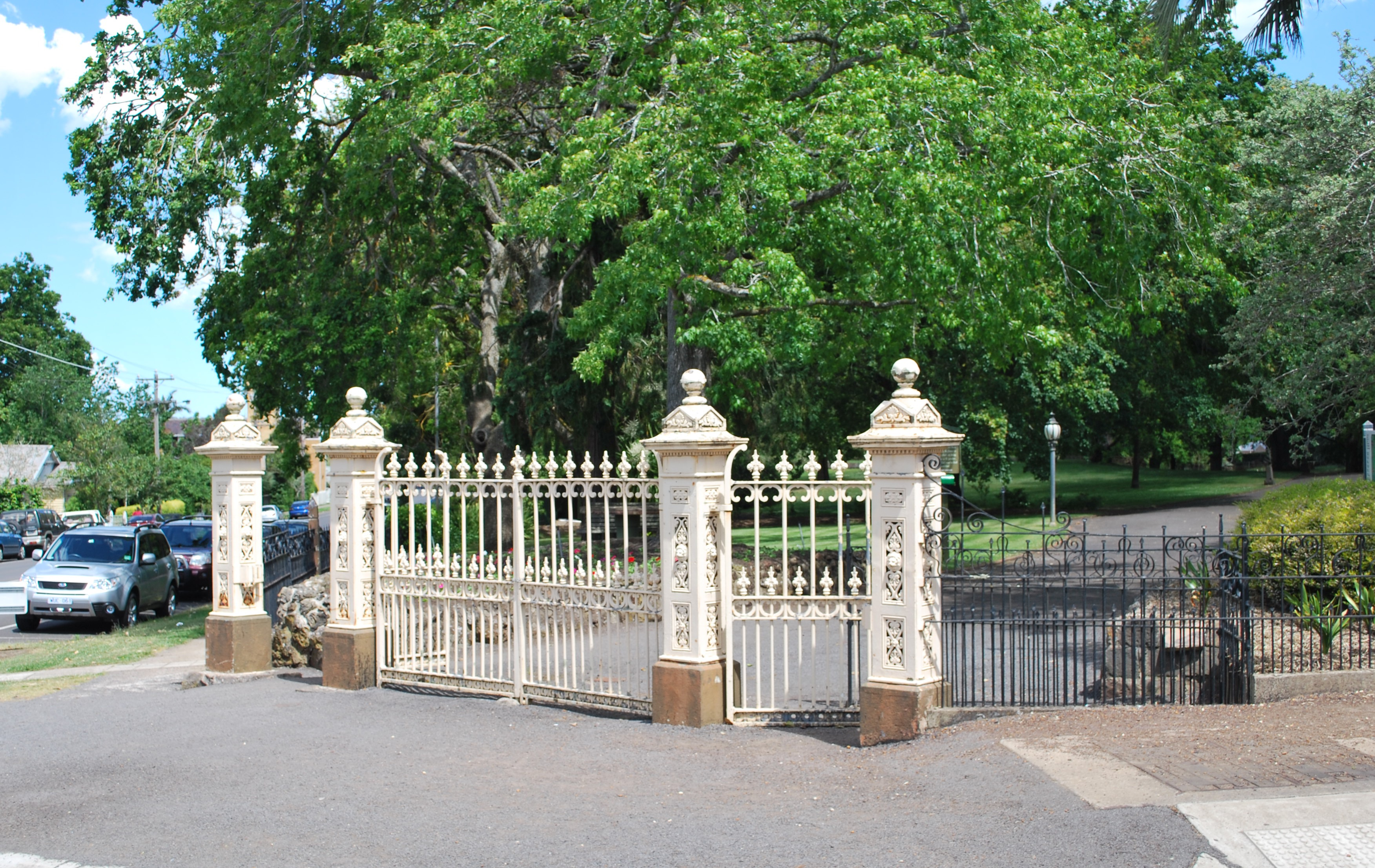
Botanic Gardens

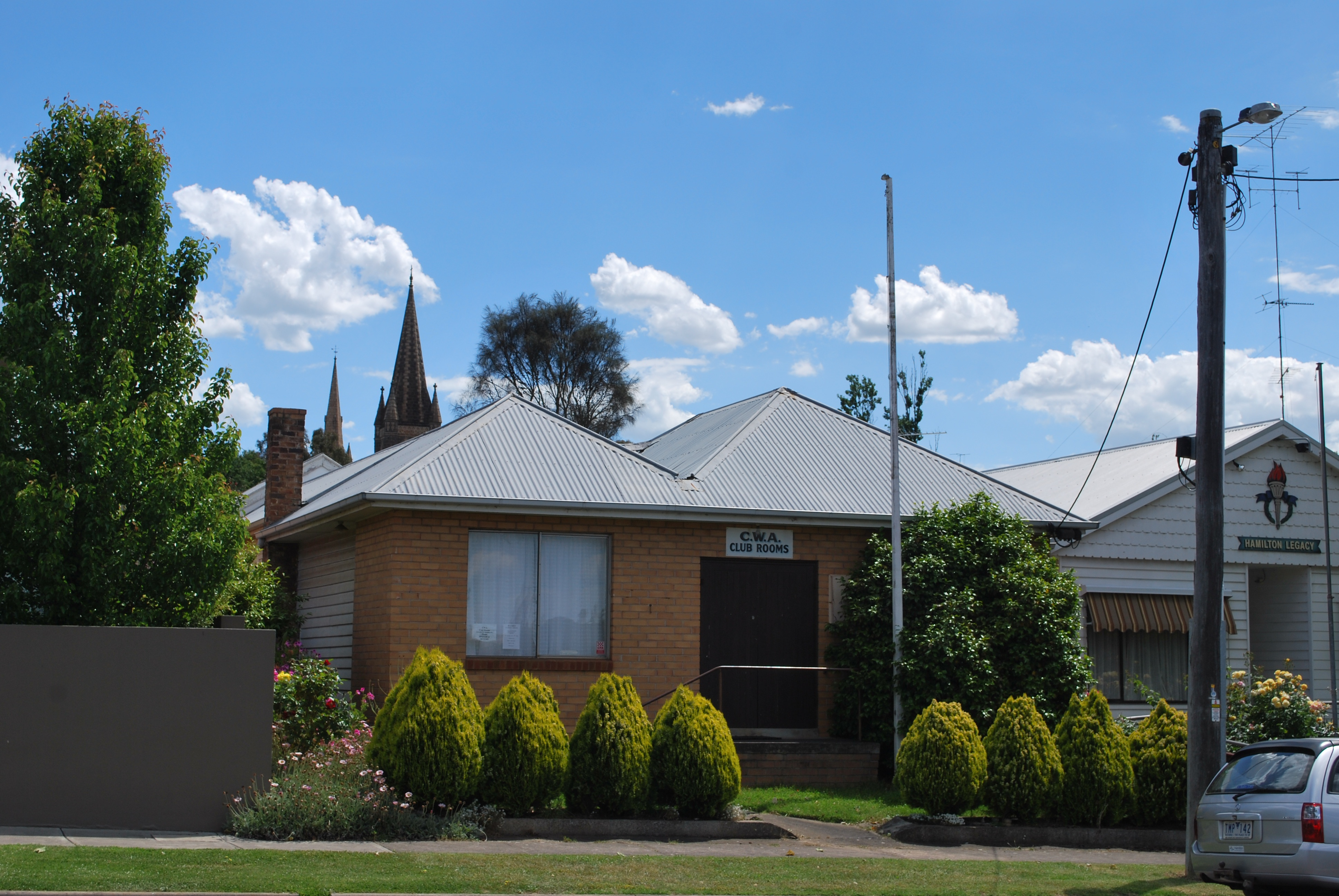
CWA

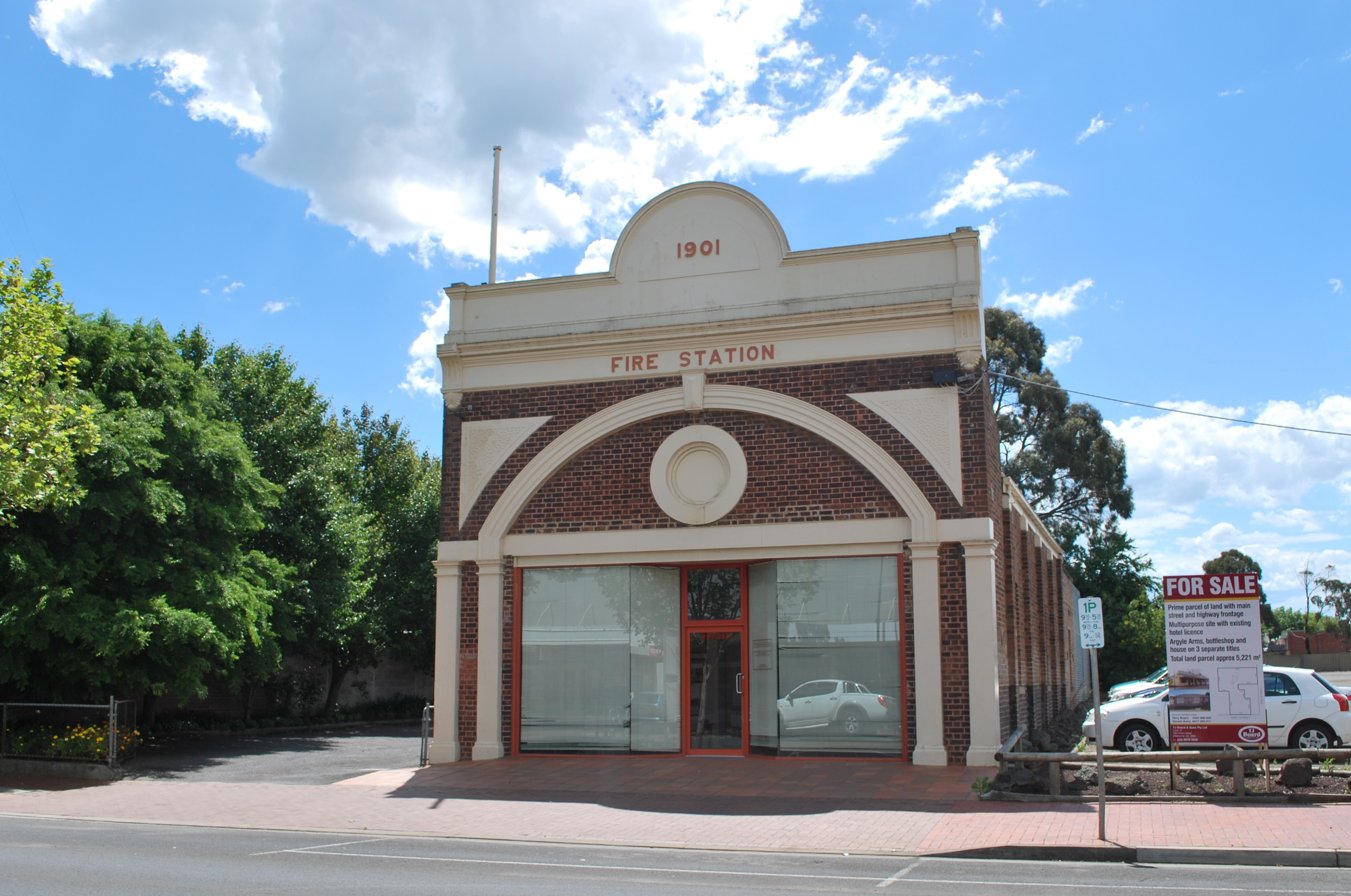
Fire Station

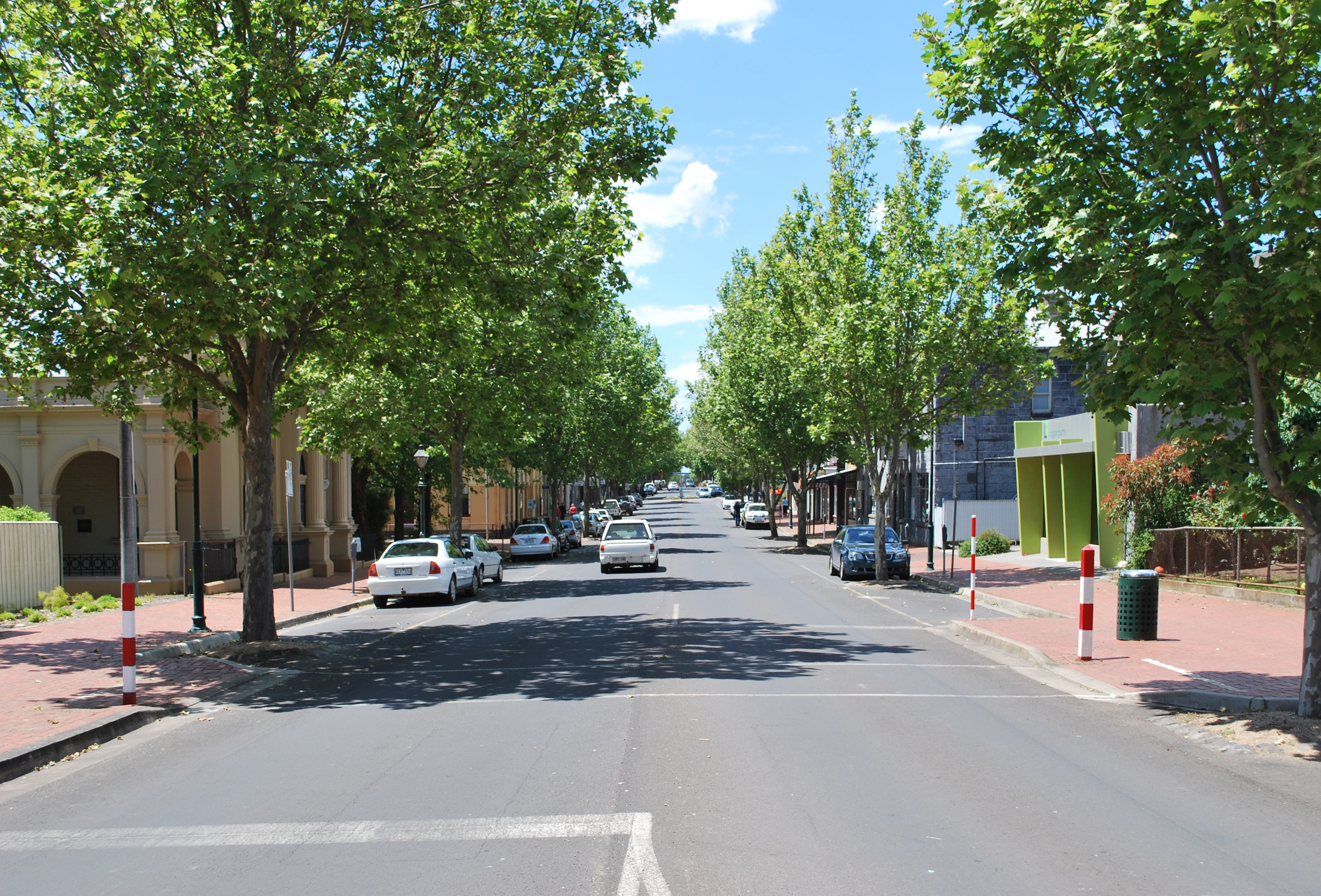
Grey Street

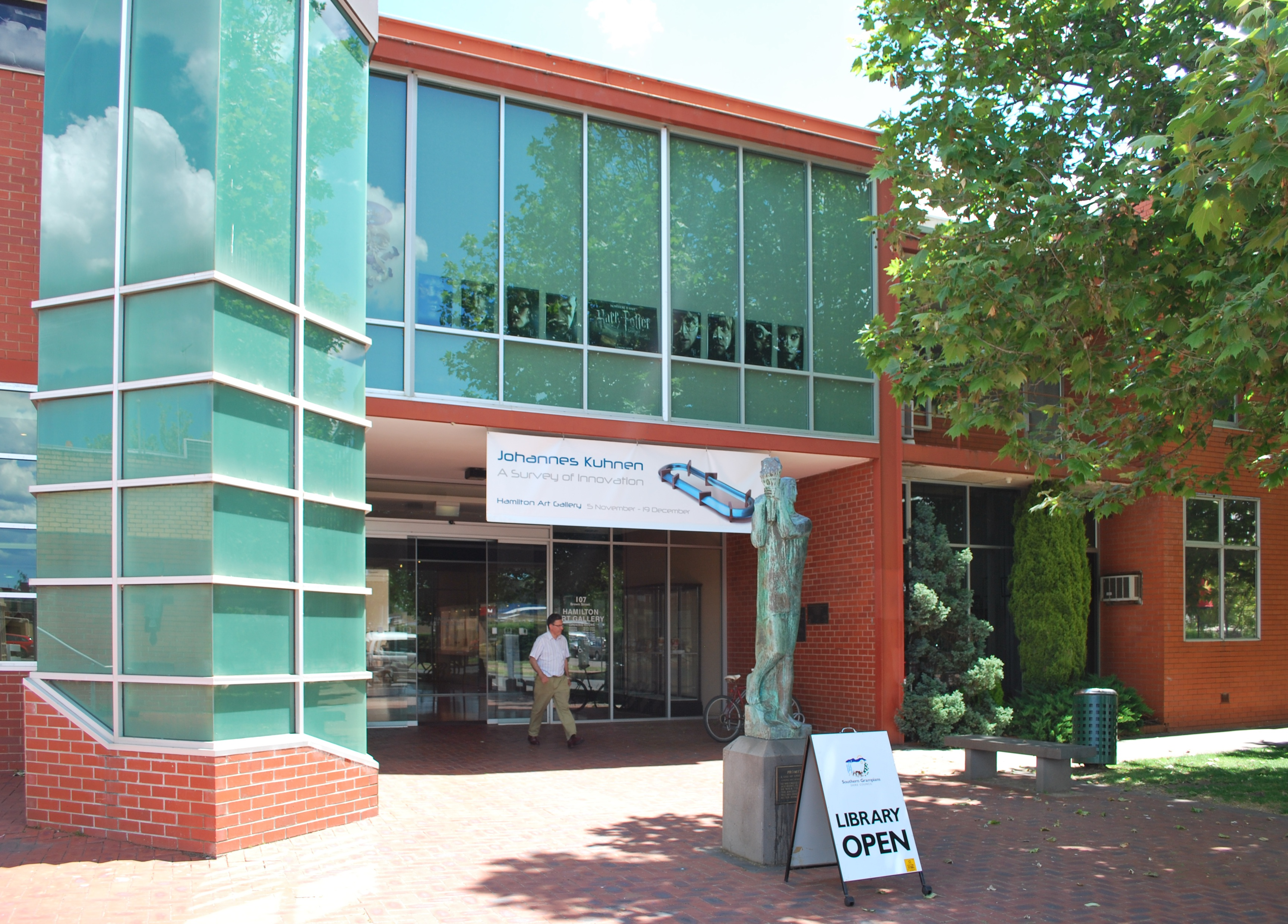
Library

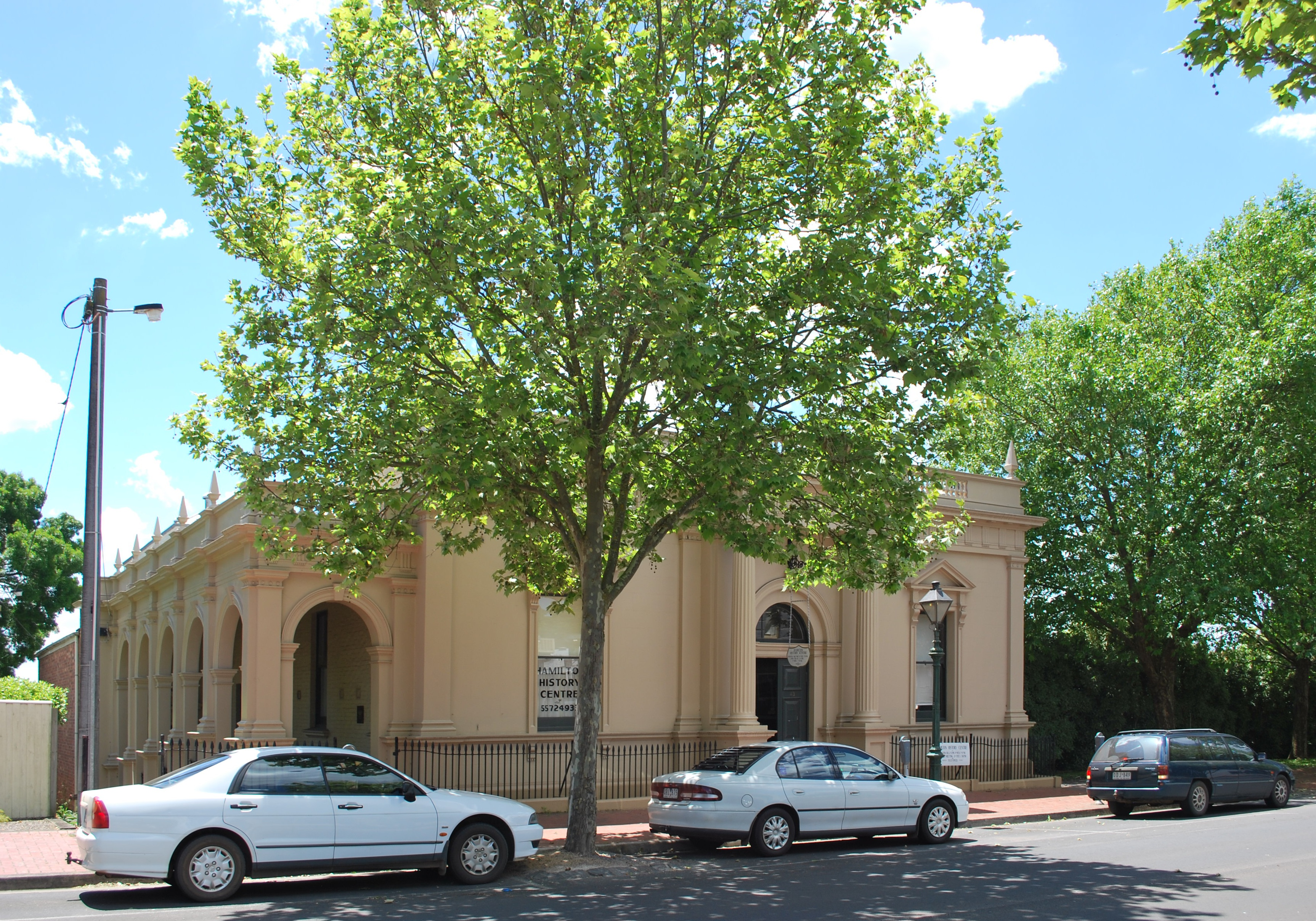
Hamilton Mechanics Institute

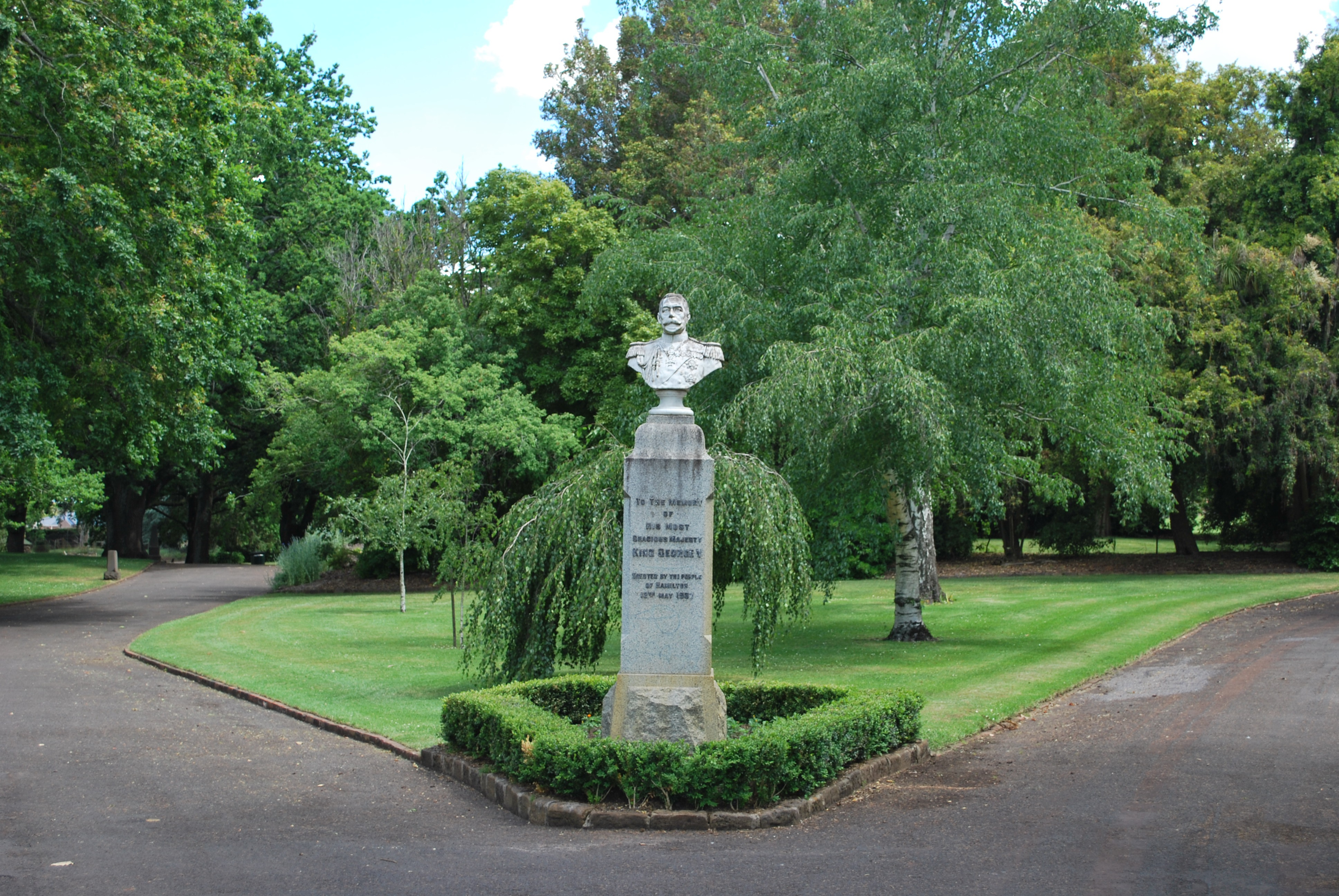
Hamilton Memorial George V

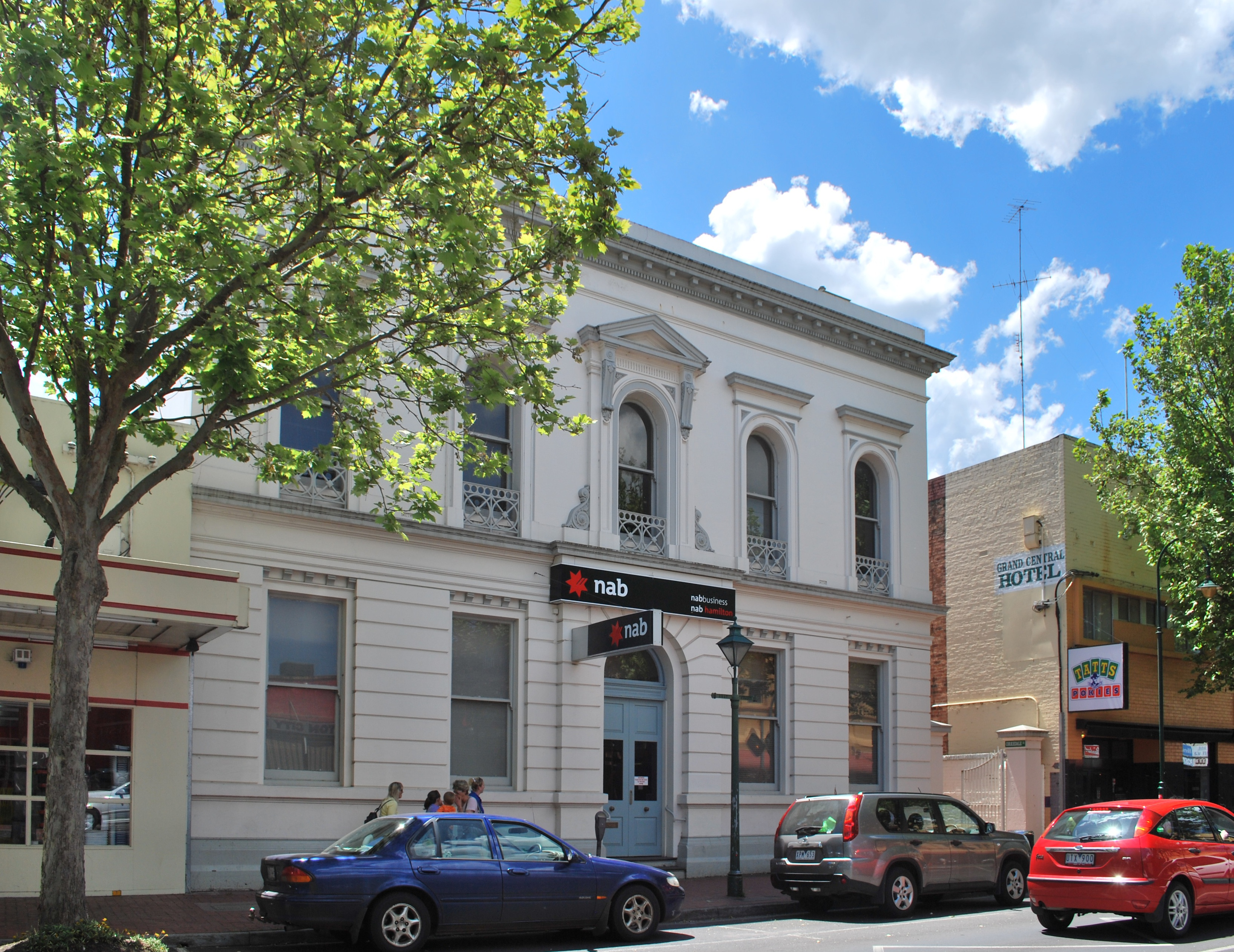
Hamilton National Australia Bank

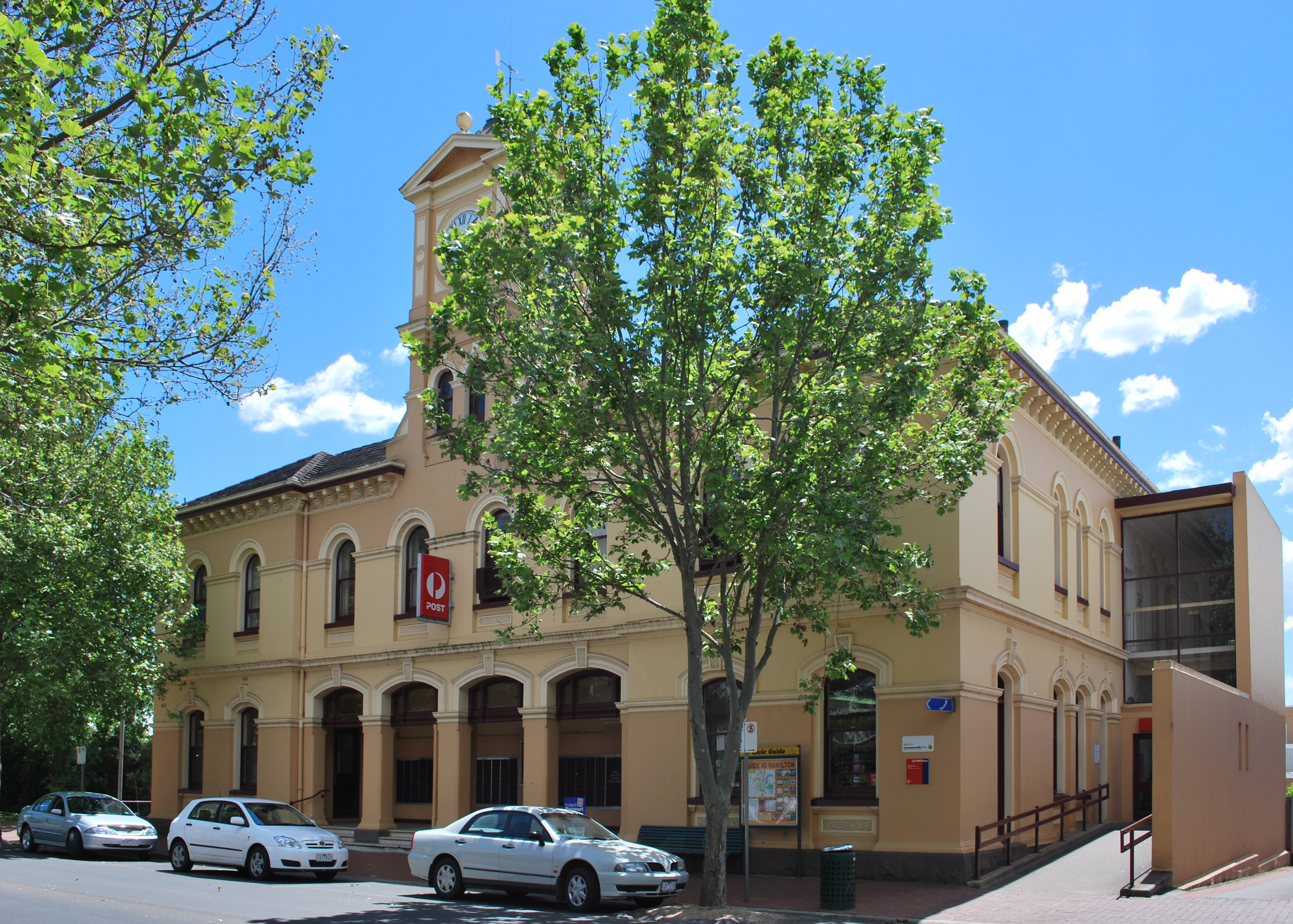
Hamilton Post Office

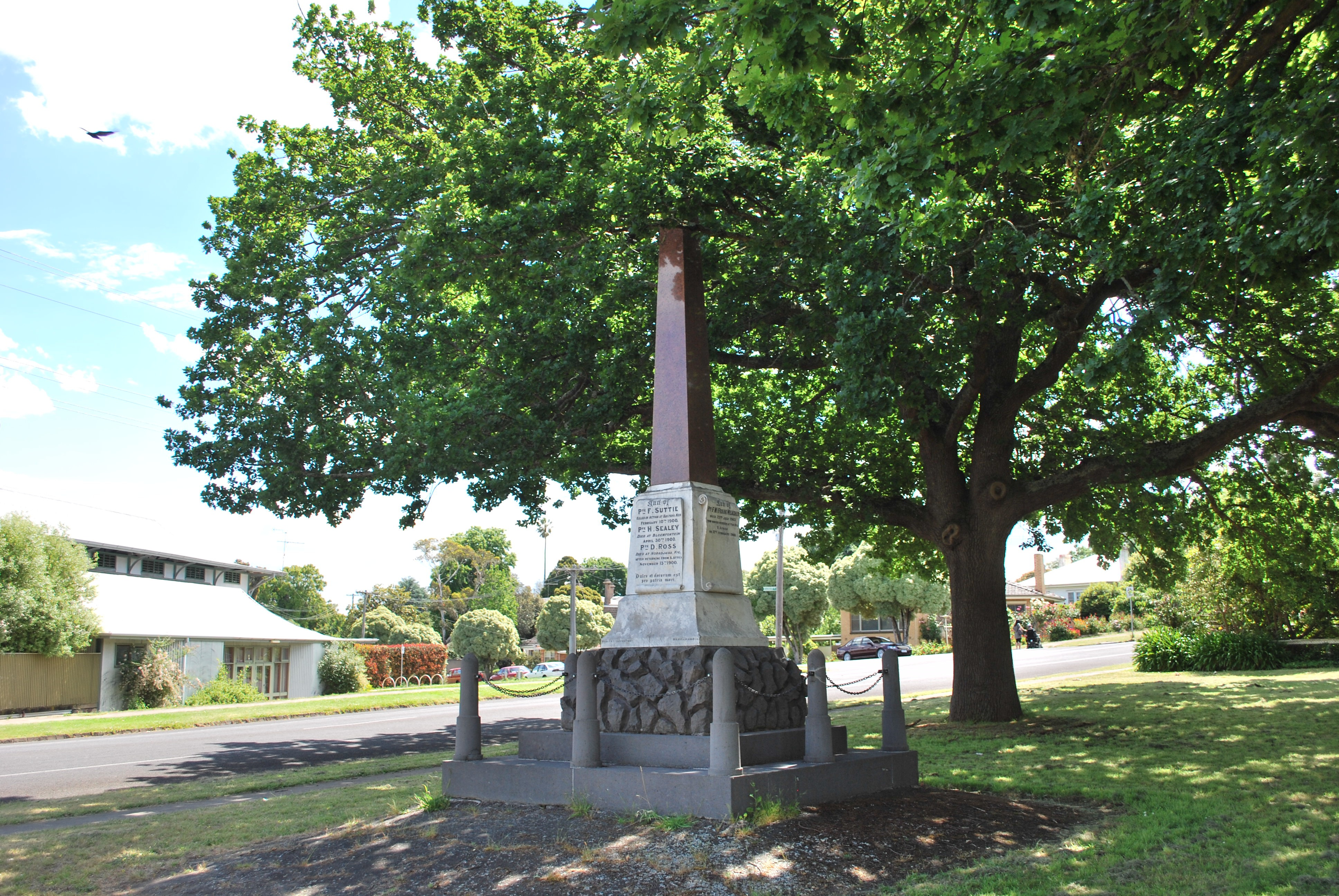
Boer War Memorial

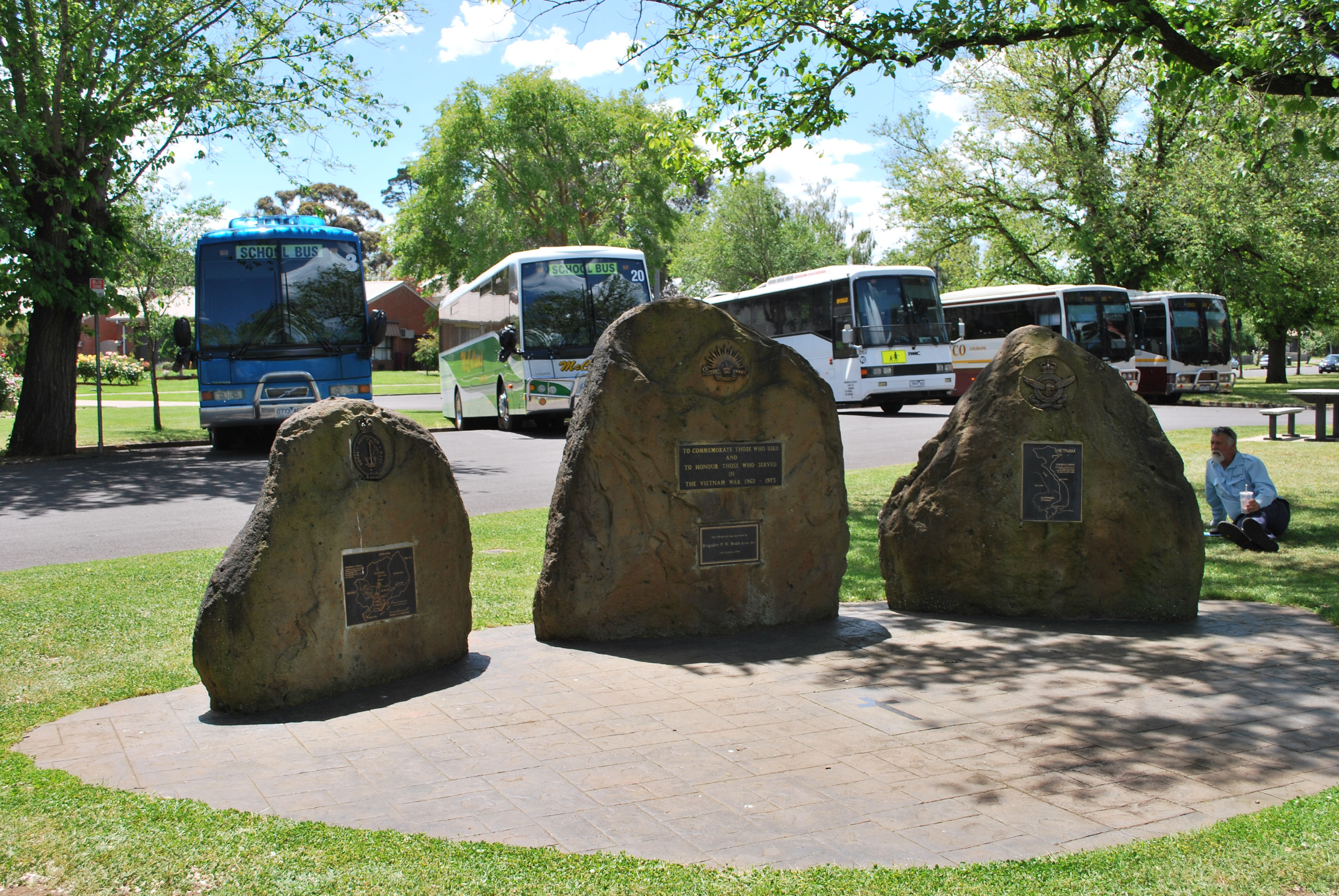
Hamilton Vietnam War Memorial

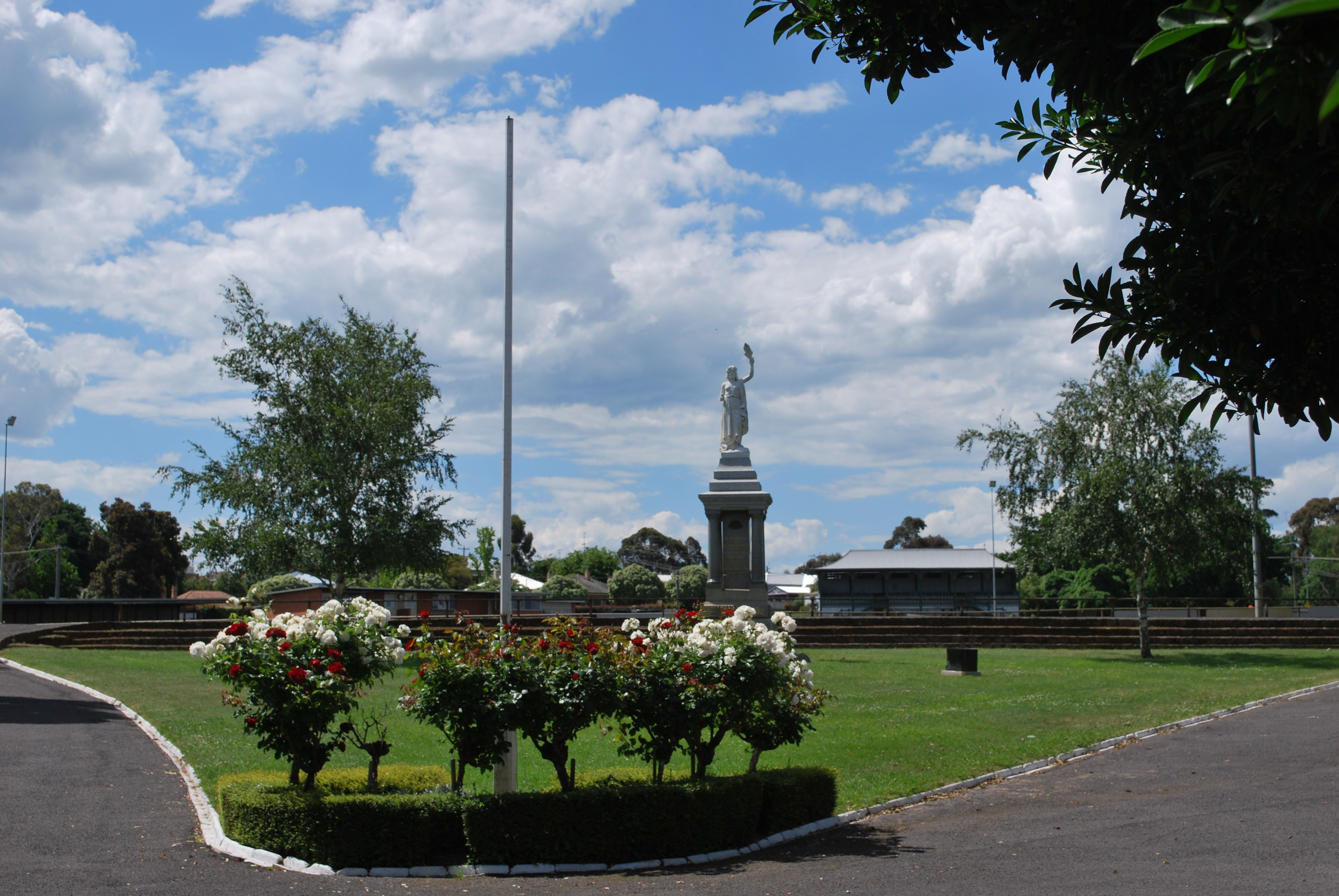
Hamilton War Memorial

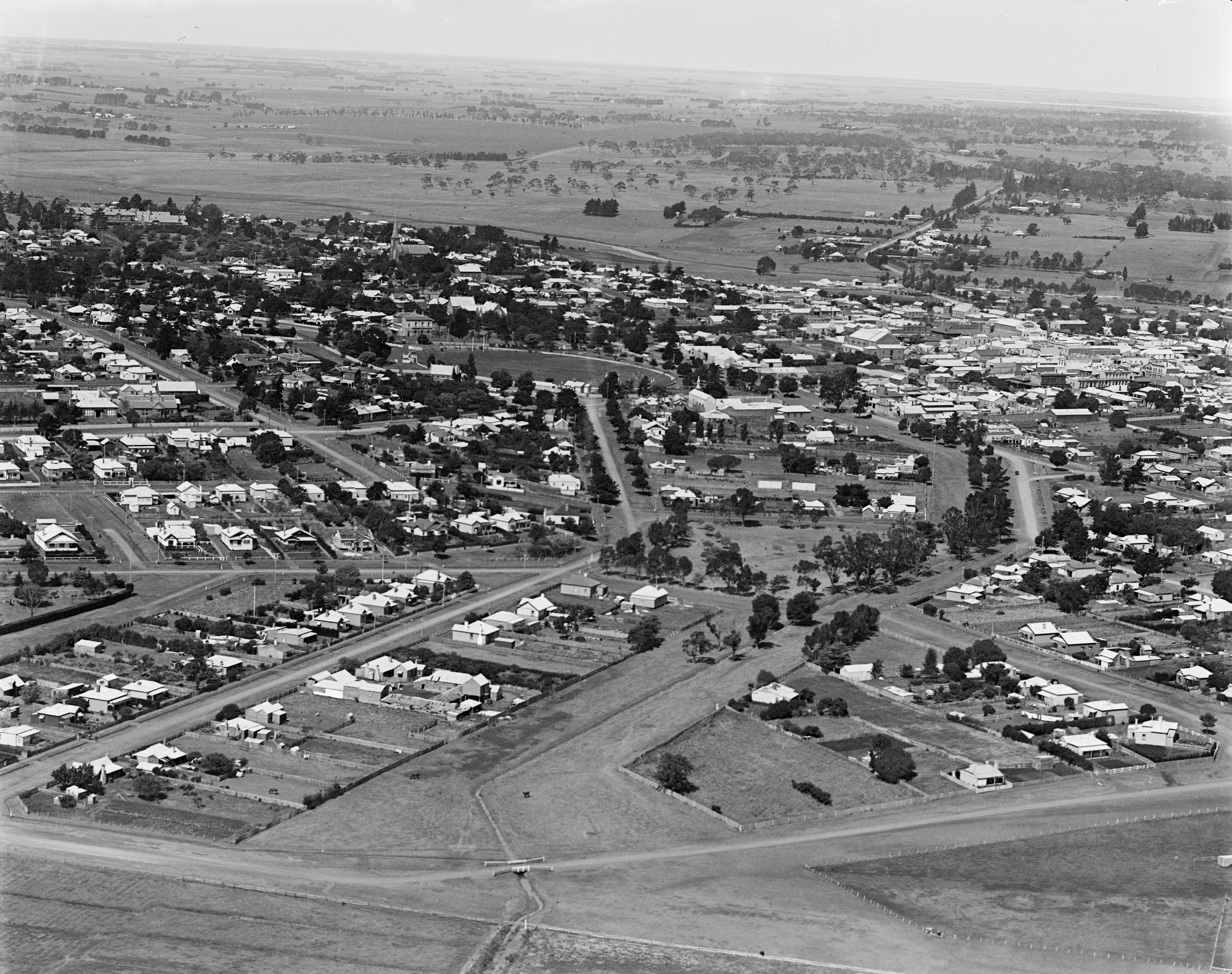
Hamilton in 1927

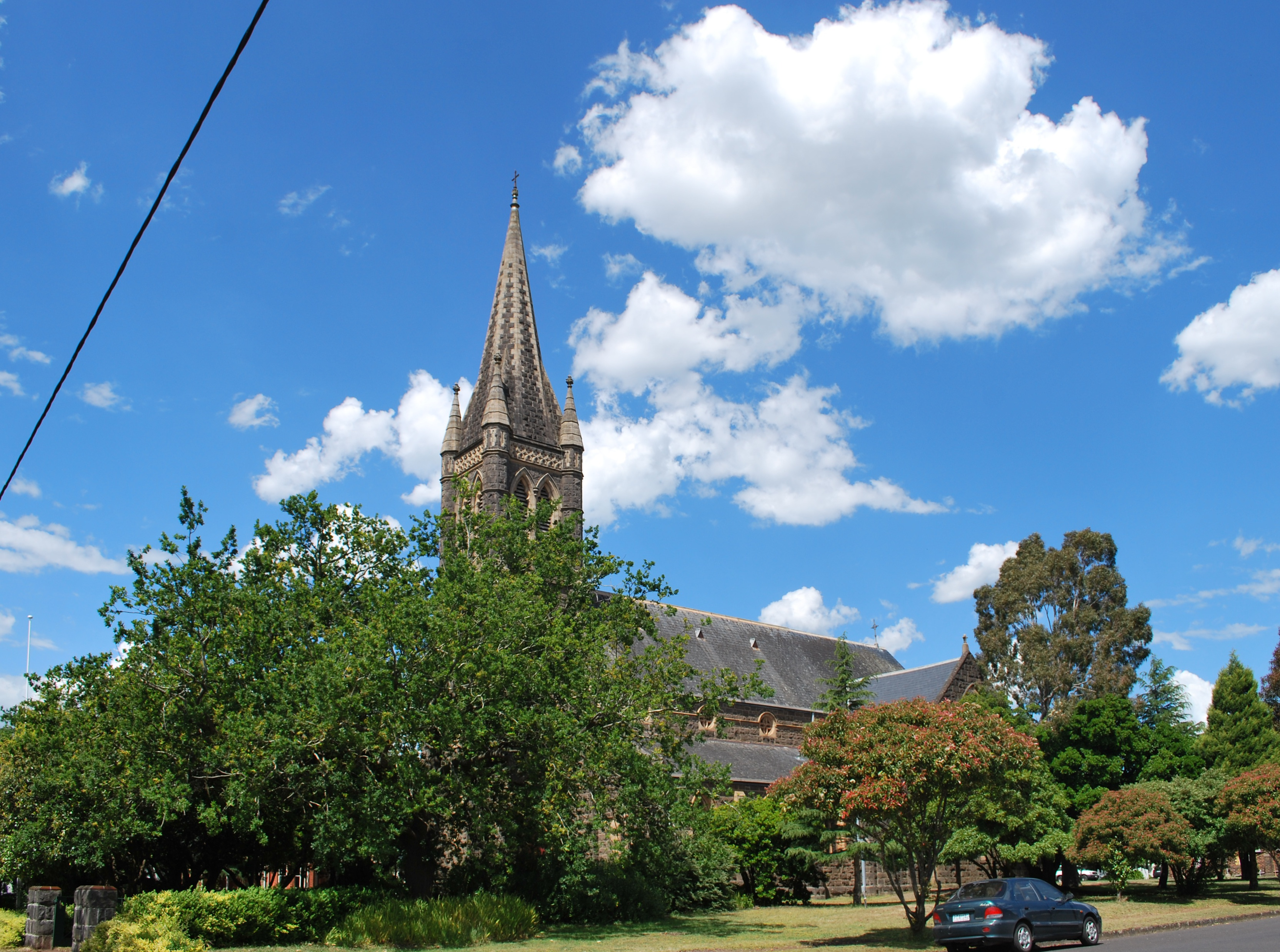
Anglican Church

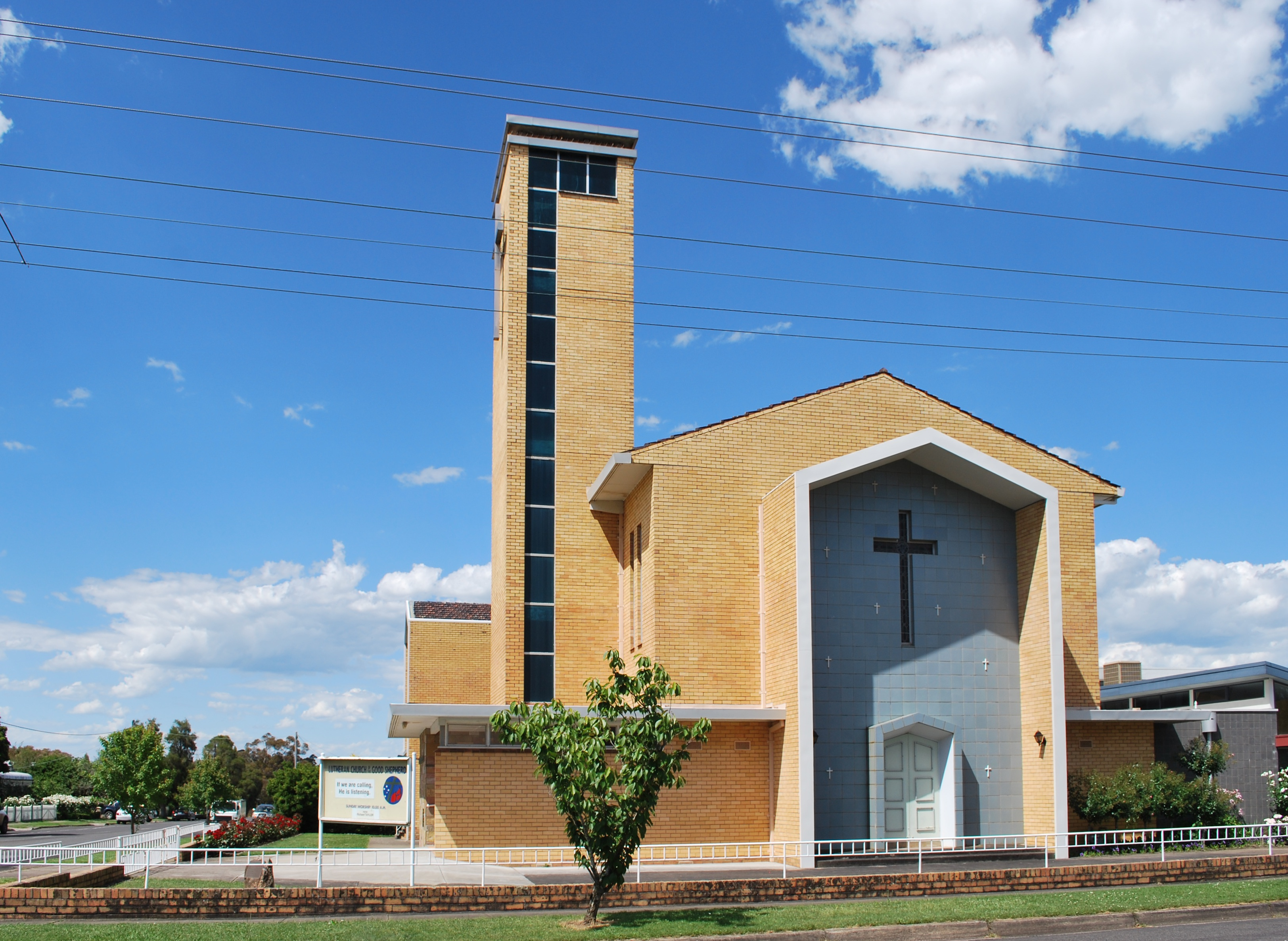
Lutheran Church

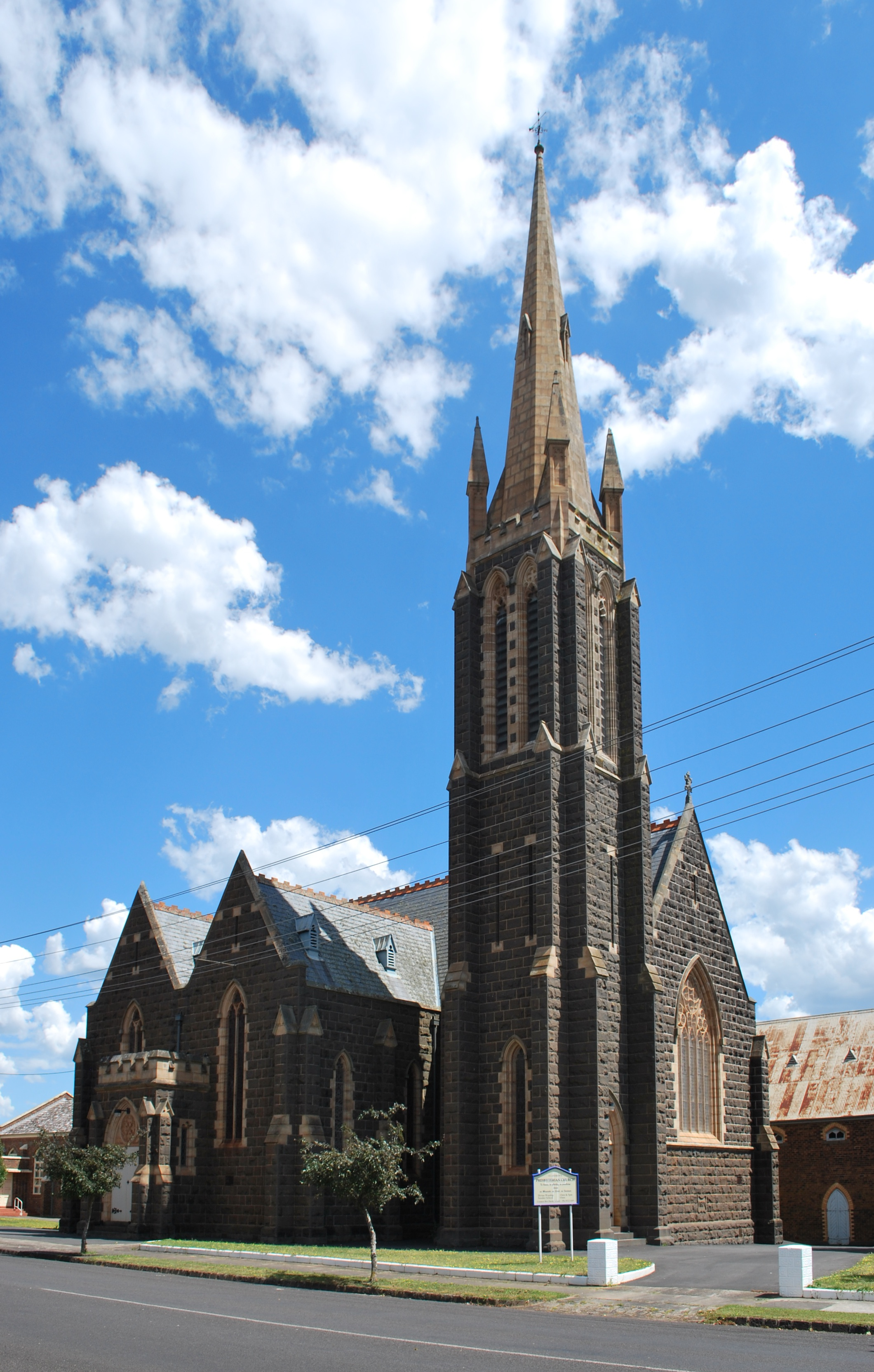
Presbyterian Church

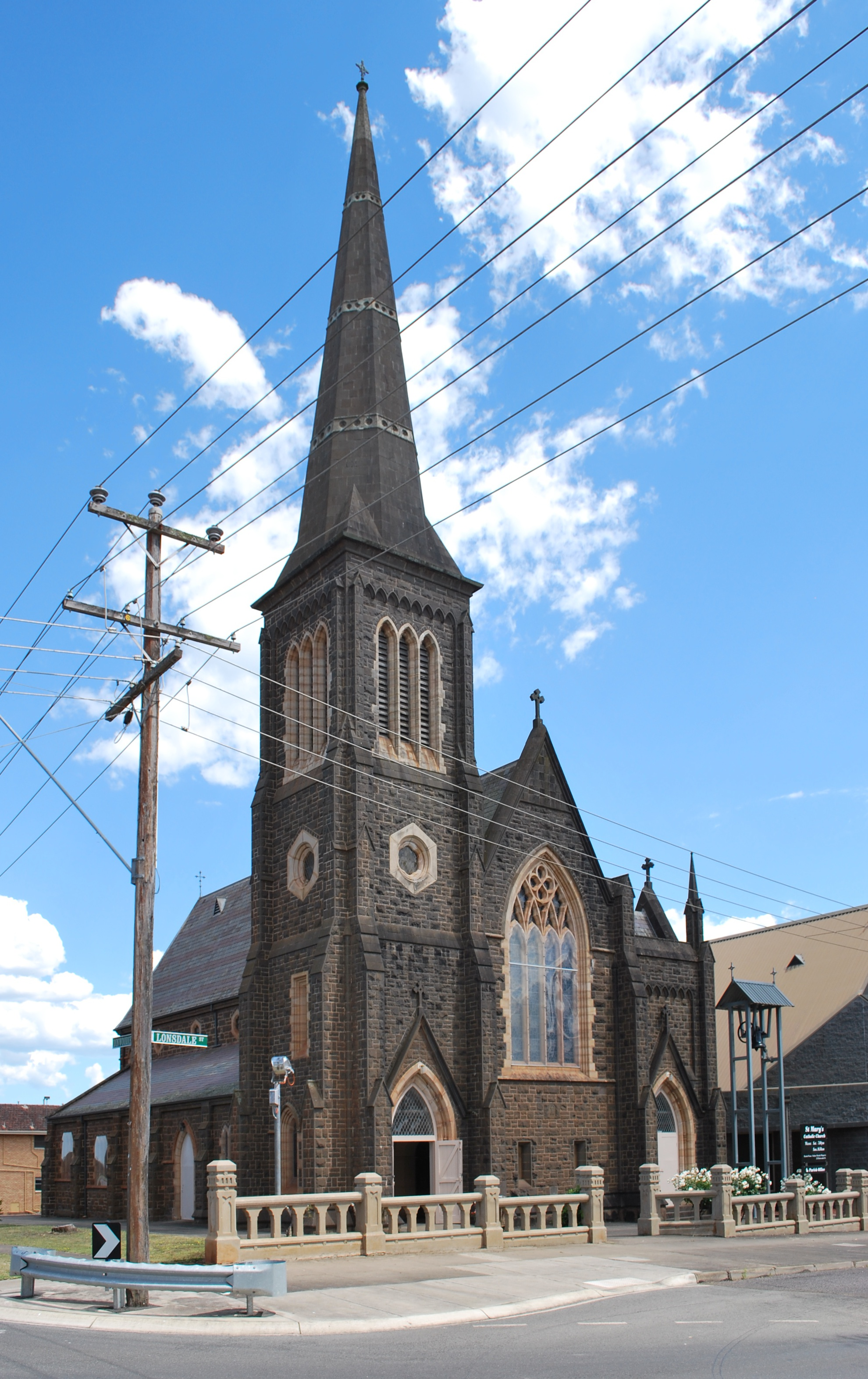
Catholic Church

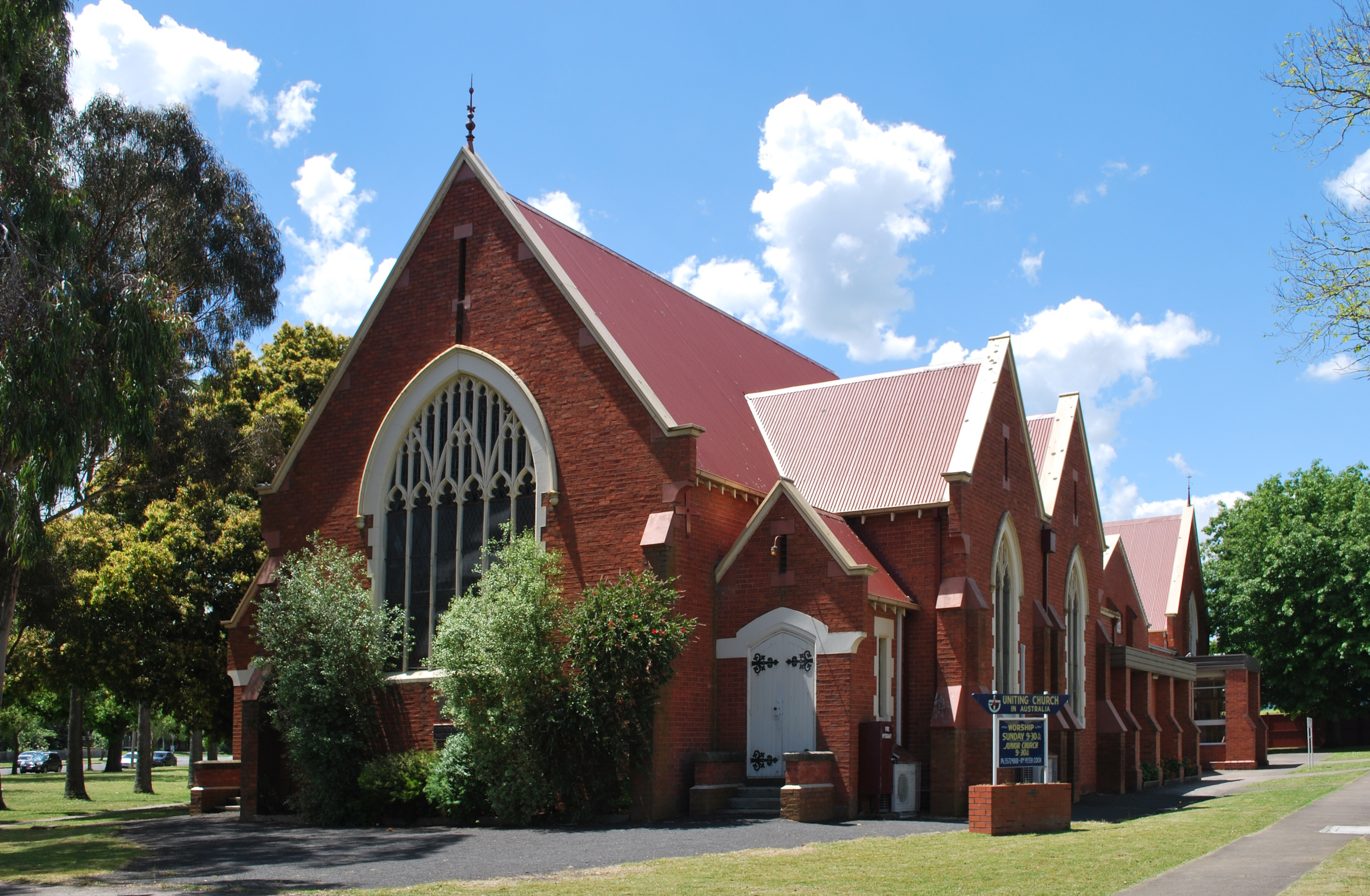
Uniting Church
