= George Threlfall (engineer) =

Australian engineer and entrepreneur

Personal details
- Born: 1819 Lancashire, England
- Died: 8 April 1897 (aged 77–78) Ballangeich, Victoria, Australia
- Spouse: Bridget Hickey
- Children: Grace Mary, Thomas Kyle, William Michael, George Sylvester, Catherine(Kitty), Henry, James Murtagh, Mary Catherine (Kitty), Richard Vincent Cornelius
- Parent(s): William and Catherine Threlfall
- Occupation: Engineer, farmer

George Threlfall (1819–1897) was an Australian engineer and entrepreneur who founded the mining company that later became the Phoenix Foundry.

== Biography ==
George Threlfall was born in Lancashire, England in 1819. He trained as an engineer in England before sailing for Australia in 1851. He arrived at Williamstown, Victoria where he set up an engineering business. With the discovery of gold later that year thousands of immigrants moved to Ballarat. In 1852, George decided to move and set up business in Ballarat at the height of the gold rush, making and repairing picks and tools for miners and mining machinery.

In 1854 this business was renamed Carter & Co in Armstrong Street, Ballarat with the addition of partners, iron-founder William Shaw, moulder Robert Holden and engine smith Richard Carter, producing a wide range of products. He left this business in January 1858. The business was later renamed the Phoenix Foundry employing 96 men by November 1861.

He married Bridget Hickey in 1861 in Ballarat and had nine children, eight reaching adulthood. He remained in Ballarat for many years becoming a shareholder in the Sons of Freedom Gold Mining Company at Napoleon Lead near Buninyong in 1863. He acquired a property in Ballangeich in an unusual way. He decided to swap his property in Ballarat with Captain John Eddinton who owned Ballangeich Station, Mr Eddington taking Mr Threlfall's property and Mr Threlfall taking the old Ballangeich homestead and portion of the property. This enabled him to enjoy fishing and shooting and join many sporting clubs in the area. He was a member of Mortlake Shire Council for many years, replacing Cr Eddington.

He remained at Ballangeich until his death at his residence, Hopkins-house on 8 April 1897 at the age of 78. His widow remained at the Ballangeich homestead until her death on 14 January 1926 at the age of 86.

George Threlfall who played Australian Rules Football for Richmond was his grandson.

Mary Threlfall, matron of Greenslopes Private Hospital was his granddaughter.
