= Codrington, Victoria =

Codrington
- Town
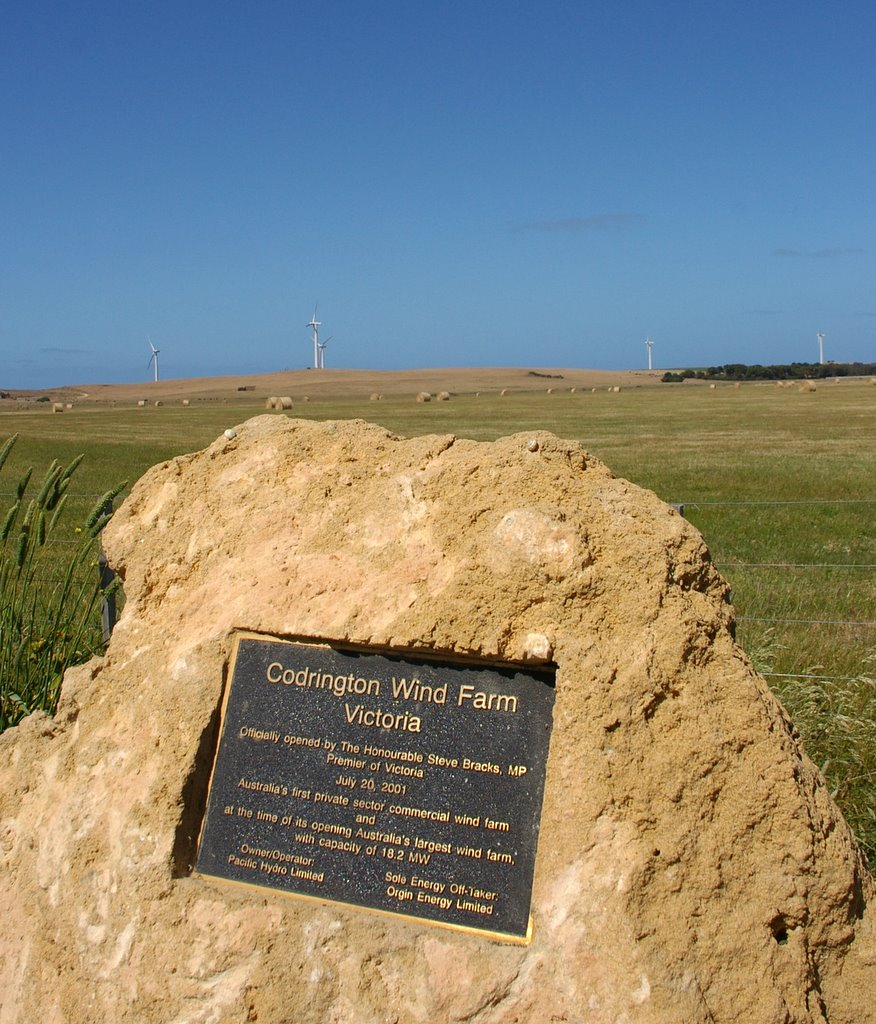

- Coordinates: 38°15′59″S 141°57′08″E
- Country: Australia
- State: Victoria
- LGA: Shire of Moyne

Population
  - Total: 52 (2016 census)
- Postcode: 3285

Codrington is a rural locality on Portland Bay in the south-west of Victoria, Australia, on the Princes Highway between Portland and Port Fairy. It is a sparsely populated area; at the 2016 census the district had a population of 52 persons, living in 15 dwellings.

It is the site of Pacific Hydro’s Yambuk Wind Farm and the adjacent Codrington Wind Farm.

Codrington is notable for its wind farms and for being the only township in Australia to be named after a bushranger.

== 'Codrington Revingstone' ==
On 29 June 1850 the Portland to Melbourne mail was stuck up by a man with a double-barrelled shotgun near Spring Creek, along Portland Bay between Portland and Belfast (now Port Fairy). The robber took possession of the mailman’s horse and pack-horse with the mail-bags and rode off. Chief Constable Frizzell from Belfast and a local landholder set off in pursuit; they managed to catch the man and locked him in the Belfast watch-house. The robber was described as a stout man, about 6 feet 10 inches in height, and gave his name as 'Codrington Revingstone'. The average height of men born in the United Kingdom in the early 1800s was about 5 feet 6 inches, so a reported height of 6 feet 10 inches would seem to be a gross exaggeration.

Revingstone was committed for trial and on June 27 he was taken aboard the steam coaster Cecilia at Warrnambool for transfer to Melbourne Gaol. While the vessel was lying in Warrnambool Bay Revingstone broke out of his cabin and escaped. On August 8 Revingstone, now well-armed and mounted, bailed up the Portland to Melbourne mail once again, a few miles from the location of the first robbery. The robber told the mailman that the police force was “a set of applewomen”.

On September 9 the following was printed in the Belfast Gazette: “Mr. Revingstone is reported to be quite composedly employed at a saw-mill in the interior convenient to the mail line of road, and says he is occupying his time until he thinks there may be something in the mail worth taking”. On 20 November 1850 the Portland mail was once again robbed by “the notorious Codrington Revingstone”, this time further inland near Mount Sturgeon (north-east of Hamilton township). Revingstone told the mailman he had been waiting three weeks for his opportunity, as on previous occasions the mail-cart had been carrying too many passengers.

The brazenness of Revingstone's taunts and criminal activities eventually prompted action by Government authorities. Charles La Trobe, superintendent of Port Phillip District, offered a reward of 30 pounds for the apprehension of Codington Revingstone. Revingstone responded to this with a letter published in the Belfast Gazette in late November or early December. Calling himself “William Green alias Codrington”, the bushranger asked “does [La Trobe] think any man will be so mean as to inform for his paltry £30” and in turn offered 100 pounds “to any man or woman who will deliver into my hands Charles Joseph La Trobe, and by my word if I get hold of him, I will work the shine out of his ----- carcase”. The letter concluded that the writer was “ready for another turn of the Portland bags, but the beggarly rascals put nothing in them but love-letters; I could tell you some secrets – but honour amongst thieves”.

== Codrington township ==
The area along Portland Bay where Rivingstone committed his first two mail robberies was known locally as 'Codrington's Forest'. The settlement of Codrington that developed in the 1870s was the only township in Australia to be named after a bushranger.

In the 1870s a township close to the coast named Codrington was surveyed on the projected road from Port Fairy to Portland (between Yambuk and Tyrendarra East). The proposed township was named after the surveyed parish in the County of Villiers which had earlier been named Codrington.

A post office was established at Codrington on 19 August 1878.

A road was later built inland and the township of Codrington was never populated.

Codrington Post Office closed in 1966.

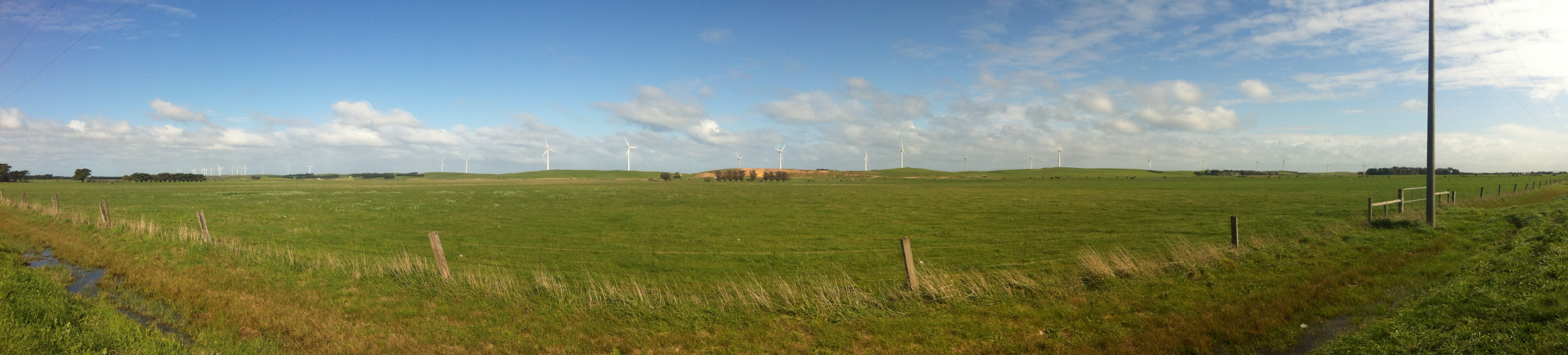
A panoramic view of the Codrington rural district
