= George Threlfall (footballer) =

Australian rules footballer

Personal information
- Full name: George Sylvester Threlfall
- Born: 11 November 1899; Warrnambool, Victoria
- Died: 2 December 1988 (aged 89)
- Original team: Warrnambool

Playing career^{1}
Years	Club	Games (Goals)
1919, 1923–24	Richmond	8 (4)
- ^{1} Playing statistics correct to the end of 1924.

George Sylvester Threlfall (11 November 1899 – 2 December 1988) was an Australian rules footballer who played with Richmond in the Victorian Football League (VFL).

Born at Warrnambool he was a son of George Sylvester and Elizabeth Jane (née Holland)Threlfall of Ballangeich. He was the grandson of George Threlfall who founded the business which later became the Phoenix Foundry. He attended St Joseph's Christian Brothers College, Warrnambool. He married Marie Kealey of Abbotsford.
