= St Helens, Victoria =

St Helens Victoria
- Coordinates: 38°15′24.6″S 142°4′6.3″E
- Population: 34 (SAL 2021)
- LGA(s): Shire of Moyne

St Helens is a town in the Shire of Moyne, Victoria, Australia.
