= Tower Hill Wildlife Reserve =

Protected area in Victoria, Australia

- IUCN category VI (protected area with sustainable use of natural resources)
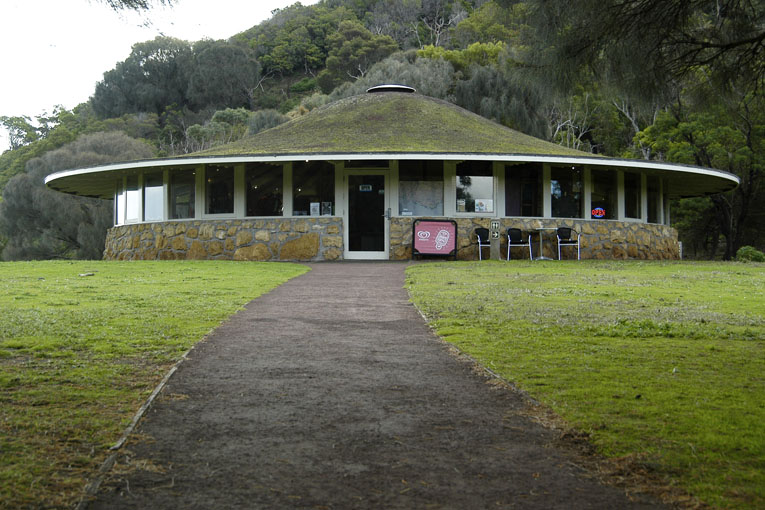
- Tower Hill Visitor Centre

- Location within Victoria
- Location: Victoria
- Nearest city: Warrnambool
- Coordinates: 38°19′03″S 142°21′37″E
- Area: 6.24 km^{2} (2.41 sq mi)
- Established: 1892
- Governing body: Parks Victoria; Worn Gundidj Aboriginal Cooperative

Tower Hill Wildlife Reserve
- Interactive map of Tower Hill Wildlife Reserve

Register of the National Estate
- Official name: Register of the National Estate
- Designated: 30 June 1992
- Reference no.: 15250

Victorian Heritage Register
- Official name: Victorian Heritage Register
- Designated: 8 March 2007
- Reference no.: VHR H2114

Tower Hill Wildlife Reserve, officially Tower Hill State Game Reserve, is a protected area located in the Australian state of Victoria, approximately 275 kilometres (171 mi) west of Melbourne, and 15 kilometres (9.3 mi) north-west of Warrnambool. It encompasses the dormant Tower Hill volcano and wetland and is 614 hectares (1,520 acres) in area.

Established in 1892 as a national park, the land remained degraded until 1961, when it was declared a State Game Reserve and an extensive revegetation program was begun. It is now full of mature native vegetation and reintroduced native species, such as koalas, wallabies and possums. The Worn Gundidj Aboriginal Cooperative manages the park in partnership with Parks Victoria.

== History ==
Aboriginal Australian kitchen middens at Tower Hill show 5000-year-old Tasmanian devil bones. Greenstone axe heads and other artefacts excavated from the tuff indicated that Aboriginal people were resident in the area when the volcano erupted, dated in 1990 as c.25,000 BP. However, it was reported in 2020 that new evidence, which had come to light by using a more sophisticated method of dating than previously, known as radiometric dating, showed that both Budj Bim and Tower Hill volcanoes erupted at least 34,000 years ago; moreover, based on the axe head found in 1947, people were in the area before those eruptions.

The local people were the Koroitgundidj, for whom the area was a valuable source of food. Their descendants still retain special links with this country.

After European settlement, much of the vegetation was cleared, and the land used for farming and quarrying. Tower Hill became Victoria's first national park by the passing of the Tower Hill National Park Act 1892 (56 Vict. No. 1271 (Vic)), but degradation of the landscape and native wildlife habitats continued until it was declared a State Game Reserve in 1961, when a major revegetation program began. The program used an 1855 painting by Austrian-born artist Eugene von Guerard as a guide for re-planting appropriate species. By 1981, about 25,000 trees and shrubs had been planted, along with herbs, grasses and rushes, and native animals were reintroduced. Populations of koalas, grey kangaroos, wallabies, echidnas, brushtail and ringtail possums, sugar gliders and over 160 species of bird were successfully established in the 1980s, and are still there today.

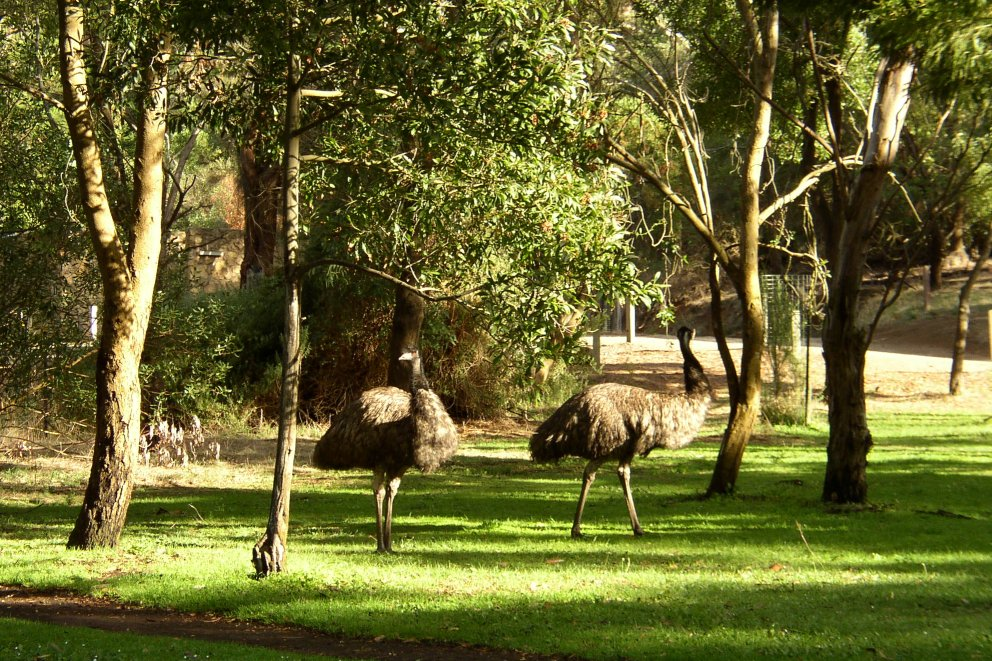
Emus in the picnic area

The Tower Hill Visitor Centre, completed in 1969 and opened in 1970, located in the central complex of volcanic cones, is an important public building designed by Melbourne architect Robin Boyd. Partly constructed from local limestone, he described his structure as "a complete, one-piece, yet seemingly organic growth". Boyd was an avid conservationist and designed the building in harmony with nature, with the circular shape and sloping roof mirroring hilltops on the volcanic island.

=== Naming ===
The origin of the English name, Tower Hill, is not certain. One source suggests that it arose in the 1840s owing to its resemblance to a castle, while another credits a sailor from Glasgow with "naming the site after Tower Hill in Scotland”.

== Description and governance ==
The reserve is about 275 kilometres (171 mi) west of Melbourne and 15 kilometres (9.3 mi) north-west of Warrnambool. It includes the extinct Tower Hill volcano and wetland and is 614 hectares (1,520 acres) in area. While earlier part of the Shire of Koroit, immediately prior to 1994, it was an unincorporated area managed in conjunction with Lady Julia Percy Island. It then became part of Moyne Shire.

Since 2002, the Worn Gundidj Aboriginal Cooperative, whose staff includes descendants of the original inhabitants, has managed the Visitor Centre in partnership with Parks Victoria, providing information on the geology, flora, fauna and cultural heritage of the area through displays and guided bushwalking tours. In November 2019, it was reported that visitors taking the tours had doubled in the previous three years. There has been discussion about changing the status of Tower Hill from state game reserve to national park status, which would bring additional restrictions, but a change of title is necessary to qualify for extra grants. As of March 2020, Parks Victoria is developing a "business case for future government investment for the Tower Hill State Game Reserve (the reserve)".

The park attracts almost 300,000 visitors annually.

Despite protests as far back as 1958, shooting continues to be permitted in the reserve during the duck hunting season.

=== Upgrade proposal ===
A masterplan published in September 2020 by the Victorian Government and put out to the community for consultation proposes expenditure of more than A$11 million on an upgrade of the infrastructure around the volcano, including the provision of accessible toilets and walking trails linking to Koroit and a nearby rail trail. The plan also includes "low impact accommodation" and a "restaurant with function space and wellness centre".

== Heritage and IUCN listings ==
The site is listed on the Victorian Heritage Register in 2007 and was listed on the now-defunct Register of the National Estate in 1992.

The wildlife reserve is categorised as an IUCN Category VI protected area.

== Gallery ==
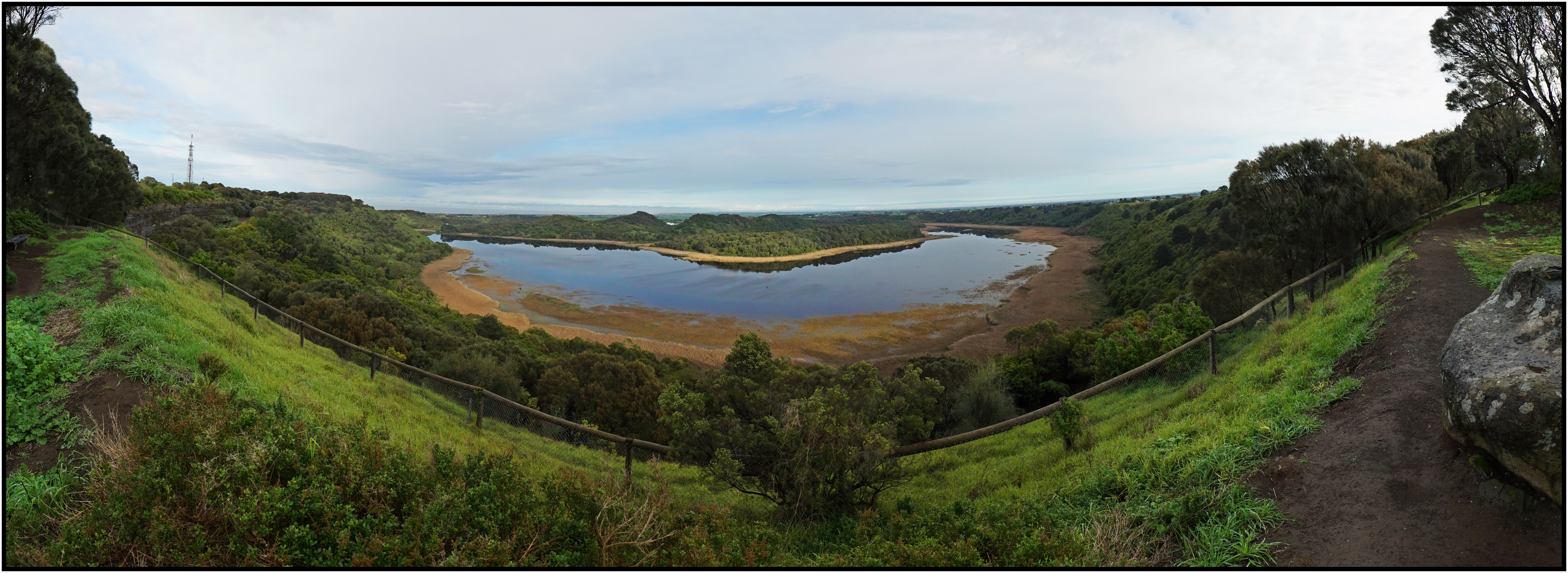
Panoramic photograph from the Eugene von Guerard lookout at Tower Hill, looking south. This lookout is located at approximate location from which he painted his Tower Hill, 1855 painting.

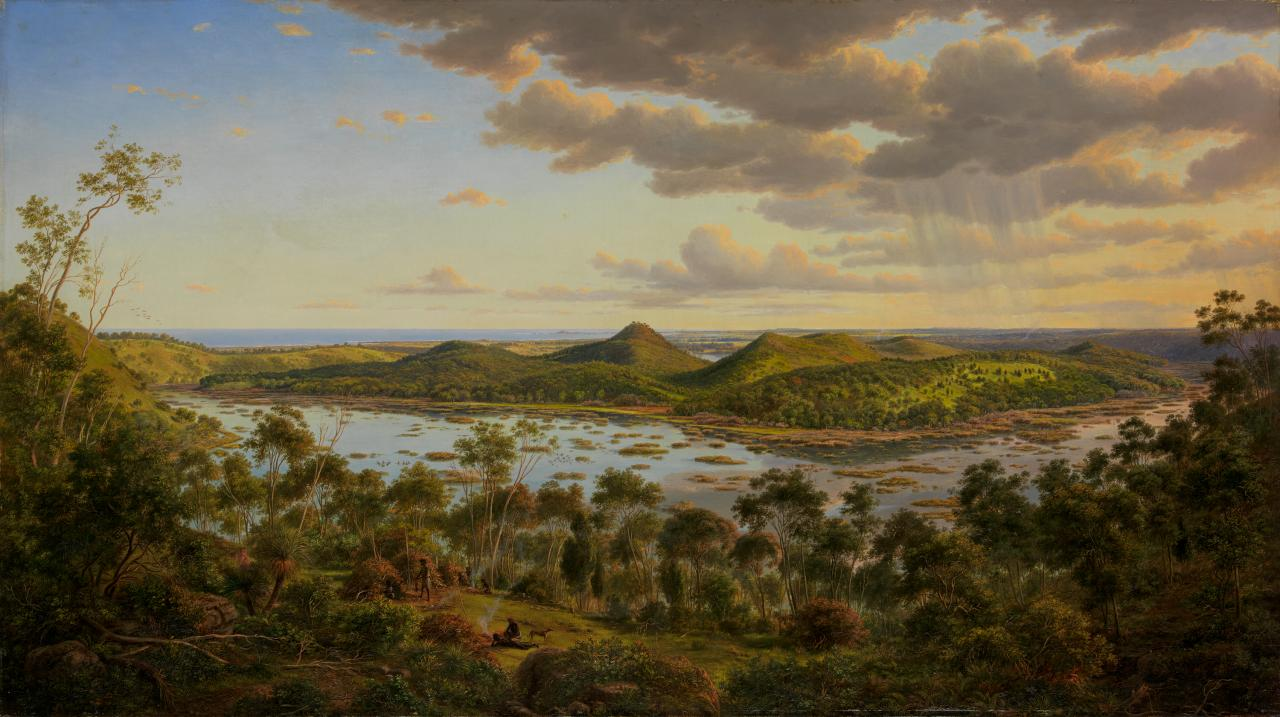
Eugene von Guerard's Tower Hill, 1855.

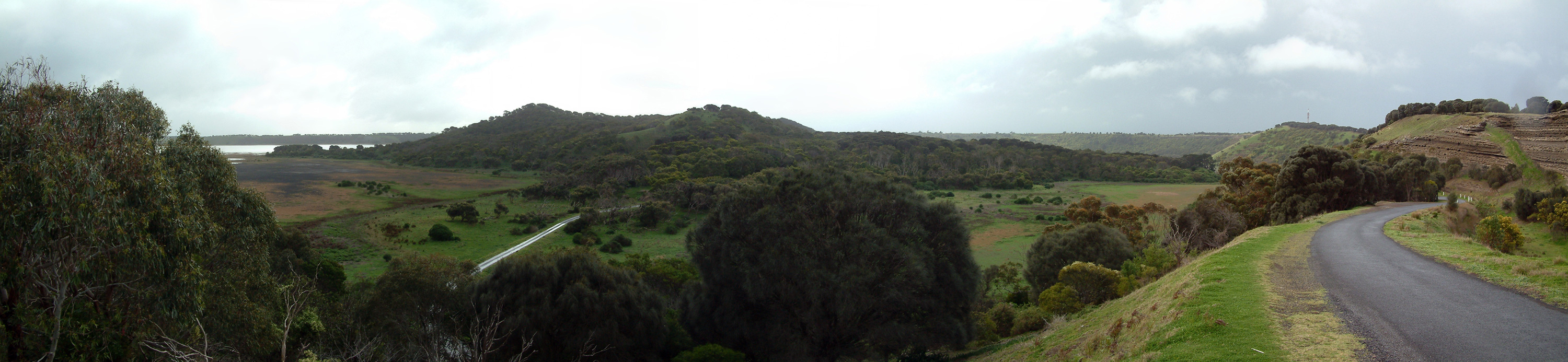
Large panorama of crater, from the south, looking north. Visible are the scoria cones forming the 'islands' in the middle of the crater, and the lake and far rims of the larger crater. Note the layering in the far right-hand side of the image.

== See also ==
- Protected areas of Victoria
