= County of Villiers =

Coordinates: 37°59′S 142°20′E

Villiers
- Cadastral division
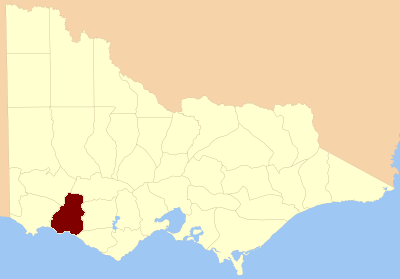
- Location in Victoria
- Country: Australia
- State: Victoria
- Established: 10 January 1849

Area
  - Total: 4,240 km^{2} (1,640 sq mi)
Lands administrative divisions around Villiers
Dundas	Ripon	Ripon
Normanby	Villiers	Hampden
Southern Ocean	Southern Ocean	Heytesbury

The County of Villiers is one of the 37 counties of Victoria which are part of the cadastral divisions of Australia, used for land titles. It includes the area to the north of Warrnambool, and to the west of the Hopkins River. The county was proclaimed in 1849.

== Parishes ==
Parishes include:

- Adzar, Victoria
- Ballangeich, Victoria
- Banangal, Victoria
- Port Fairy, Victoria
- Bilpah, Victoria
- Boonahwah, Victoria
- Boorpool, Victoria
- Bootahpool, Victoria
- Boramboram, Victoria
- Broadwater, Victoria
- Buckeran Yarrack, Victoria
- Bullanbul, Victoria
- Caramut, Victoria
- Caramut South, Victoria
- Chatsworth West, Victoria
- Clonleigh, Victoria
- Codrington, Victoria
- Cooramook, Victoria
- Corea, Victoria
- Croxton East, Victoria
- Dunkeld, Victoria
- Framlingham West, Victoria
- Hexham West, Victoria
- Jennawarra, Victoria
- Kangertong, Victoria
- Kapong, Victoria
- Kay, Victoria
- Koroit, Victoria
- Langulac, Victoria
- Linlithgow, Victoria
- Meerai, Victoria
- Minhamite, Victoria
- Minjah, Victoria
- Minjah North, Victoria
- Nanapundah, Victoria
- Nareeb Nareeb, Victoria
- Pom Pom, Victoria
- Purdeet, Victoria
- Purdeet East, Victoria
- Purnim, Victoria
- Quamby, Victoria
- Quamby North, Victoria
- St. Helens, Victoria
- Tallangoork, Victoria
- Wangoom, Victoria
- Warrong, Victoria
- Willatook, Victoria
- Woolsthorpe, Victoria
- Yalimba, Victoria
- Yalimba East, Victoria
- Yambuk, Victoria
- Yangery, Victoria
- Yarpturk, Victoria
- Yatchew East, Victoria
- Yatmerone, Victoria
- Yeth-youang, Victoria
- Yuppeckiar, Victoria
