= Deen Maar Indigenous Protected Area =

- IUCN category VI (protected area with sustainable use of natural resources)
- Location within Victoria
- Location: Victoria
- Coordinates: 38°19′37″S 142°2′11″E
- Area: 4.53 km^{2} (1.75 sq mi)
- Established: 8 November 1999

Deen Maar Indigenous Protected Area is an Indigenous Protected Area (IPA) located in south-west Victoria, Australia, on land bounded by the Eumeralla River and Bass Strait. The nearest town is Yambuk.

== History ==
In 1842 Deen Maar was the site of conflict between the Aboriginal people of the area and European colonists. This conflict is referred to as the Eumerella Wars and took place over 20 years in the mid-19th century. The remains of people involved in the conflict are at Deen Maar.

The property was purchased in 1993 by ATSIC for the Framlingham Aboriginal Trust with the intention that it become an Indigenous Protected Area, and it was granted this status in 1999. It was the first IPA in Victoria.

== Description ==
The IPA, located between the Eumeralla River and Bass Strait, has an area of 4.53 square kilometres (1.75 square miles). The country consists of limestone ridges, wetlands, lakes, and sand dunes. It is the traditional home of the Peek Whurrong speakers of the Dhauwurdwurung (Gunditjmara) nation. The IPA takes its name from the island of Deen Maar ("this man here") (aka Lady Julia Percy Island), which lies a short distance off the coast. It is classified as an IUCN Category VI protected area.

It is within the boundaries of the Yambuk Important Bird Area, identified as such by BirdLife International because of its importance for the conservation of threatened species such as the orange-bellied parrot and hooded plover.

The nearest town is Yambuk.

== See also ==
- List of massacres of indigenous Australians
- Protected areas of Australia
