= Orford, Victoria =

Orford Victoria
- Coordinates: 38°09′S 142°10′E
- Population: 105 (2016)
- Postcode(s): 3284
- Location: 295 km (183 mi) W of Melbourne; 48 km (30 mi) NW of Warrnambool; 28 km (17 mi) nw of Port Fairy; 27 km (17 mi) SE of Macarthur
- LGA(s): Shire of Moyne
- State electorate(s): South-West Coast
- Federal division(s): Wannon

Orford is a town in southwestern Victoria, Australia, 250 km west of Melbourne and 40 km north-west of Warrnambool.

Orford has several amenities, including a church and war memorial.

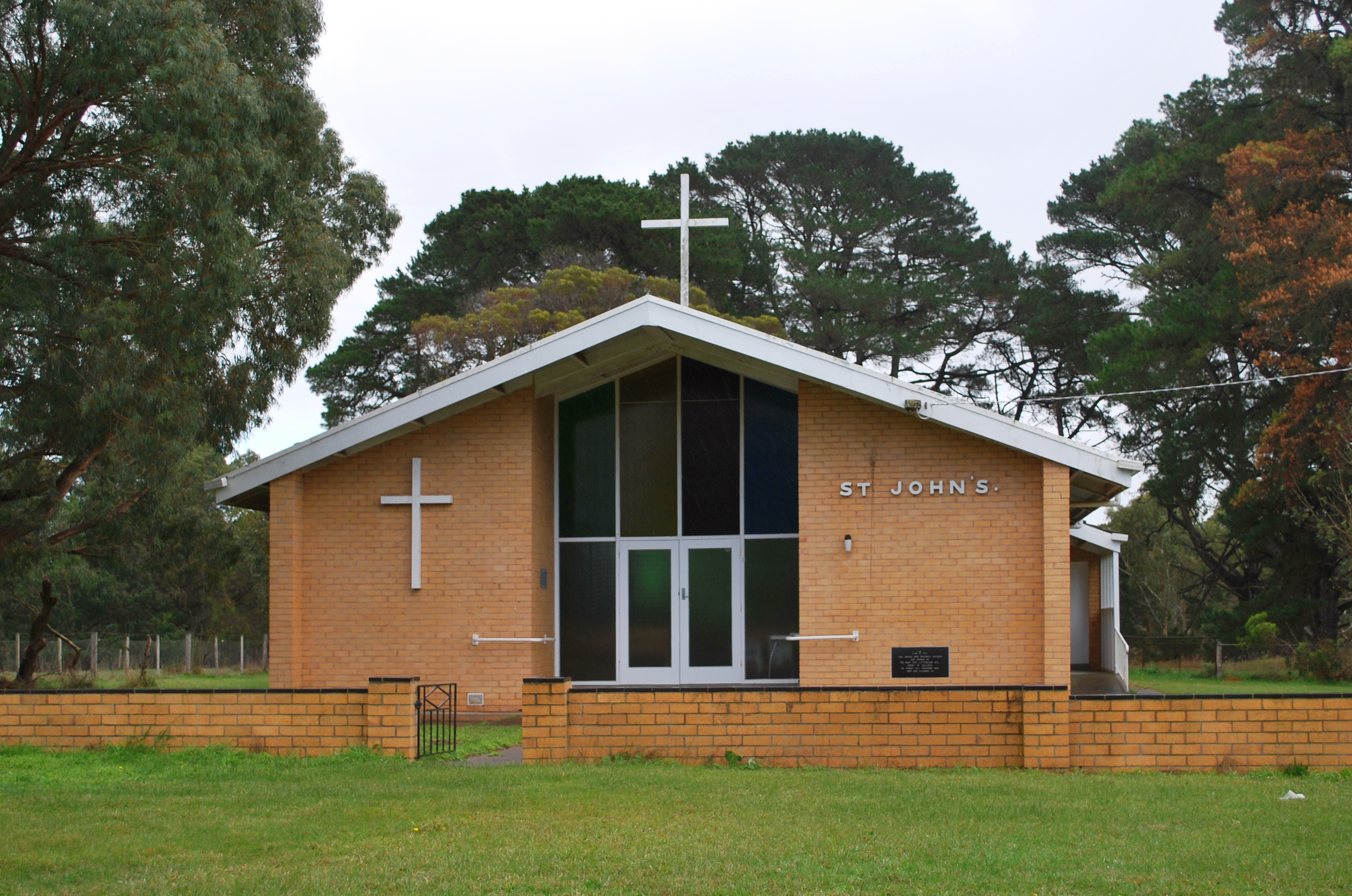
Church located in Orford

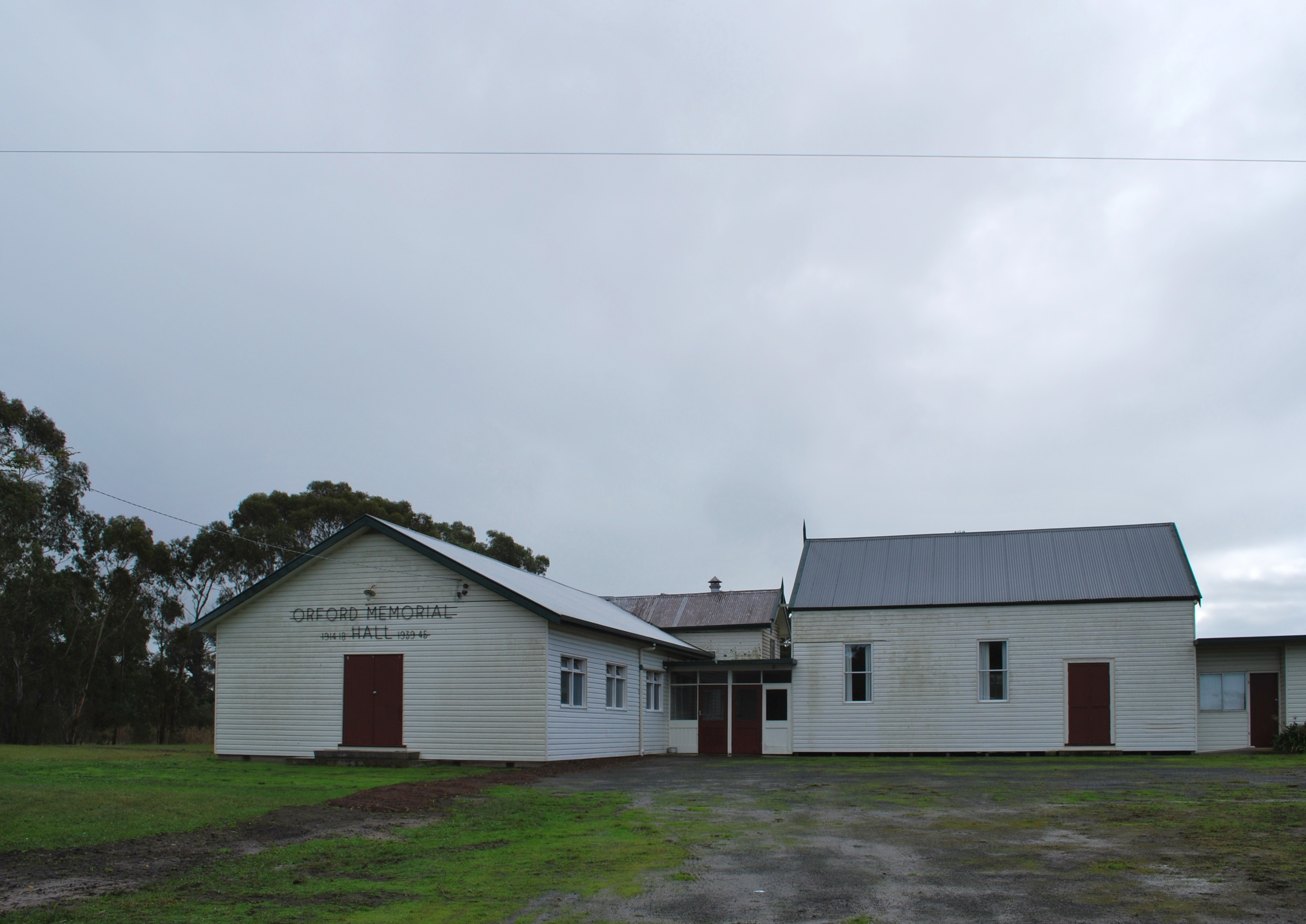
War Memorial located in Orford

Located 72 metres above sea level on the banks of the Shaw River, The area around Orford was first settled by the establishment of the Dunmore pastoral run in 1842. In 1856 a town was surveyed and named Orford, apparently after places of that name in Lincolnshire and Suffolk in England. A store was opened in the late 1860s, and a small school opened in 1870.

== See also ==
- Warrnambool
- Shaw River
- Victoria
- Australia
