= Shaw River =

Shaw River may refer to:

- Shaw River (Victoria), Australia
- Shaw River (Western Australia)
