= James Shaw Kennedy =

British soldier and military writer (1788–1865)

General Sir James Shaw Kennedy KCB
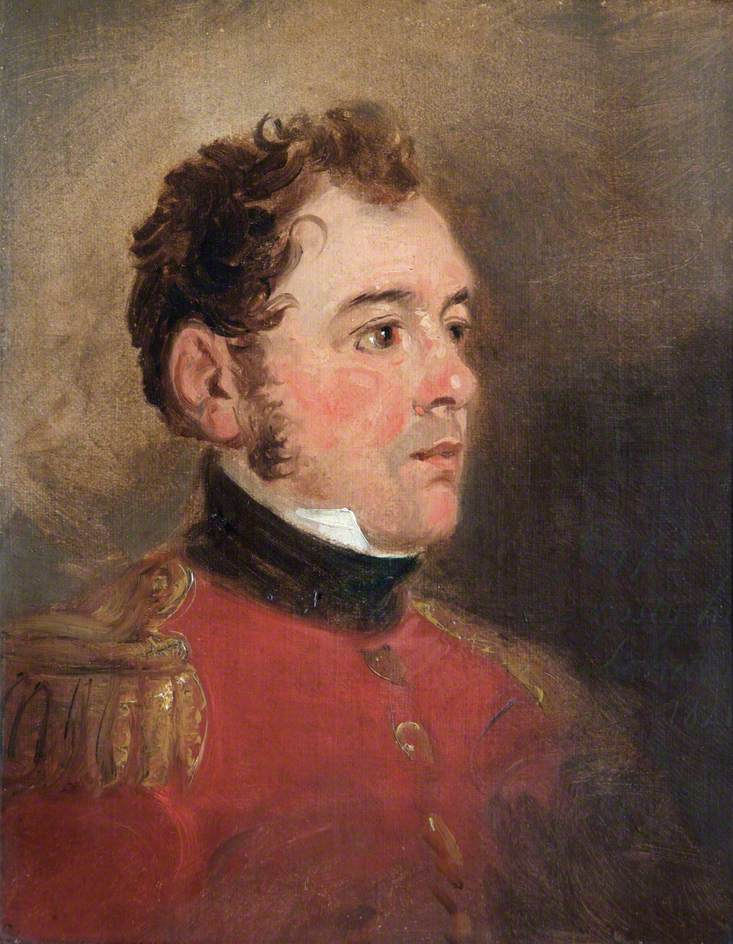
- Kennedy in 1821, by Jan Willem Pieneman, a study for The Battle of Waterloo
- Born: James Shaw; 13 October 1788
- Died: 30 May 1865 (aged 76) Bath, Somerset, England

General Sir James Shaw Kennedy, KCB (born James Shaw; (Note: In 1834, on succeeding, in right of his wife, to the estate of Kirkmichael, he added Kennedy to his surname.) 13 October 1788 – 30 May 1865) was a British soldier and military writer.

== Life ==
=== Early life ===
The son of Captain John Shaw, a former captain in the 76th Highlanders, of Dalton, Kirkcudbrightshire, James was educated at Ayr Academy. He was commissioned into the 43rd (Monmouthshire) Light Infantry in 1805, joining the regiment at Hythe, Kent where it was training under Sir John Moore. He first saw service in the Copenhagen Expedition of 1807 as a lieutenant.

=== The Peninsula ===
Under Sir David Baird Shaw took part in the Corunna Campaign. In the retreat from Corunna, led by Sir John Moore, Shaw and the 43rd fought with the rearguard to the army. On his return to England he suffered from a severe fever from which he never fully recovered. In May 1809, Shaw returned to the Peninsula with the 43rd and took part in the 250-mile march from Lisbon to Talavera where he became adjutant of his now famous regiment at the Battle of Talavera.

As Robert Craufurd's aide-de-camp during 1809 and 1810, Shaw was on the staff of the Light Division at the Coa and the Agueda, and, with William Campbell, prepared and edited the Standing Orders of the Light Division (printed in Home's Précis of Modern Tactics, pp. 257–277). He was wounded at Almeida in 1810, but rejoined Craufurd at the end of 1811 and was with his chief at the siege of Ciudad Rodrigo in January 1812. At the great assault of 19 January, Shaw carried his general, mortally wounded, from the crest of the glacis and later conveyed Wellington's summons to surrender to the French governor.

At Badajoz, now once more with the 43rd, he displayed, at the lesser breach, a gallantry which furnished his brother officer William Napier with the theme of one of his most glorious descriptive passages. At the siege and the Battle of Salamanca, in the retreat from Burgos, Shaw, still a subaltern, distinguished himself and in July 1812, was promoted to captain. At the end of the year, he had to return to England due to ill health. In April 1813, Shaw joined the senior department of the Royal Military College, Sandhurst.

=== Waterloo ===
He later returned to active service, and at the Battle of Waterloo on 18 June 1815, he was assistant quartermaster-general with the Third Division of Charles Alten. During the late afternoon of 18 June that Division had to defend its position against repeated French cavalry charges and Shaw was struck in the side, putting him out of action for a period. During the battle, one of his horses was killed and another wounded under him. Shaw's reconnoitring skill and tactical judgment was of the greatest assistance to Alten and to Wellington, who promoted him brevet major in July the same year.

His famous Notes on Waterloo (with an appendix giving a Plan for the defence of Canada) would be published fifty years after the battle, though he wrote it in 1863. It was the first work to divide the battle into five distinct but interrelated parts: a framework of the battle which was later to be used by other historians.

=== Calais and home service ===
During the Allied army's occupation of France Shaw was commandant of Calais from 1815 to 1818, receiving the new Waterloo Medal in 1816 and going on half-pay on 25 March 1817. On his return to England, he was employed as a staff officer in the north, in which role he was called upon to deal with the Manchester riots of 1819. He was also made a brevet lieutenant-colonel in January 1819.

In 1820 he married Mary Primrose Kennedy of Kirkmichael at Ayr, with whom he later had one son and two daughters:

- Wilhelmina Shaw, who died young
- Henrietta Shaw Kennedy, who married Primrose W. Kennedy of Drumellan;
- John Shaw Kennedy (d 1905), laird of Kirkmichael

=== Ireland and north-west England ===
He remained off active service until 1826 when he was appointed assistant adjutant-general in Belfast under the viceregality of Richard Wellesley (Wellington's elder brother). However, within less than a year he transferred to Manchester where he dealt with several outbreaks of civil disorder originating in the widespread dissatisfaction with working conditions. Shaw in 1829 declined Sir Robert Peel's offer of the position of first commissioner of the newly formed Metropolitan Police.

He left Manchester to become inspector-general of the Royal Irish Constabulary (RIC) from 1836 to 1838, where he raised and organized a force of 8000 men. Also in 1836 Thomas Mitchell named Shaw River (Victoria) in Victoria, after him.

After Ireland Shaw Kennedy led a retired country life for ten years, before being called upon to command an army force at Liverpool to face the Chartist movement. Soon after his Liverpool command he was offered a command in Ireland and then the governorship of Mauritius, but he had to decline both due to ill-health. A little later he briefly took up an offer of the Scottish command, but was again forced to retire due to ill health.

=== Later years ===
In 1852, Sir William Napier, referring to Shaw Kennedy, said that, "He is, perhaps, with the exception of Lord Seaton, the very ablest officer in the service". Shaw Kennedy was appointed C.B. in July 1838, and K.C.B. in 1863. On its institution in 1848 he was also awarded the Military General Service Medal, often known as the Peninsular silver medal, with three clasps. Shaw Kennedy was promoted to lieutenant-general in June 1854, and in August of the same year, he became colonel of the 47th Foot.

In 1859 Shaw Kennedy wrote an essay on The Defence of Great Britain and Ireland and in 1860 a brief autobiography. He was promoted to full general in August 1862 and died in Bath, Somerset on 30 May 1865, following a long-standing liver complaint.

== Bibliography ==
- Chichester, H. M. (1892). "Kennedy, Sir James Shaw". In Lee, Sidney (ed.). Dictionary of National Biography. Vol. 30. London: Smith, Elder & Co. pp. 433–435.
- Chichester, H. M.; Foot, M. R. D. (reviewer) (2004). "Kennedy, Sir James Shaw (1788–1865)'". Oxford Dictionary of National Biography. Oxford University Press. doi:10.1093/ref:odnb/15376.
- Craufurd, A. H. (1891). General Craufurd and his light division. p. 8.

Attribution:

- Endnotes:
  - Autobiographical notice in Notes on Waterloo,
  - The regimental history of the 43rd and Napier, passim.
