= Eumeralla Wars =

1830s-1860s series of wars in Australia

| Date | 1830s – 1860s |
| Location | Southwestern Victoria |
| Result | British occupation of the district |

Belligerents
| British colonists Border Police; Native Police | Gunditjmara people |

Commanders and leaders
| Cpt Foster Fyans; Cpt Henry EP Dana; James Blair | Tarrarer (Jupiter); Cocknose; Partpoaermin (Cold Morning); Koort Kirrup; Alkapurata (Rodger) |

Strength
| Unknown | Unknown |

Casualties and losses
| ~80 settlers dead | Up to 6,500 dead |

The Eumeralla Wars were the violent encounters over the possession of land between British colonists and Gunditjmara Aboriginal people in what is now called the Western District area of south-west Victoria.

The wars are named after the region around the Eumeralla River between Port Fairy and Portland where some of the worst conflict took place. They were part of the wider Australian frontier wars.

The conflict lasted from the mid 1830s up until the 1860s, with the most intense period being between 1834 and 1844. The Aboriginal people mostly employed guerrilla tactics and economic warfare against the livestock and property of the British colonists, occasionally killing a shepherd or settler. The colonists utilised a wider range of strategies, such as killings of individuals or massacres of larger groups of Indigenous people, including women and children, by armed groups of whalers, settlers, station workers, and members of the Border Police and the Native Police Corps. They also used more lawful means such as judicial executions and the rounding up of the local Aboriginal people and placement of them on temporary reserves.

Casualties from the conflict are estimated to be in the thousands with up to 6,500 Aboriginal deaths (based on an estimated pre-contact population of 7,000 declining to just 442), and an approximate 80 deaths of settlers.

The remains of some of the people involved in the conflict are at the Deen Maar Indigenous Protected Area.

== The Convincing Ground Massacre (1833-34) ==
Coastal Gunditjmara people first came into regular contact with British colonisers in the early 1830s when whalers such as William Dutton, John Griffiths and the Henty brothers started to establish whaling stations at Portland Bay.

The Convincing Ground Massacre (1833 or 1834) was a dispute between whalers and the Kilcarer gundidj clan over the ownership of a beached whale that occurred near to the whaling settlement of Portland Bay. The conflict turned violent, and the whalers shot dead an unknown number of people, possibly 60. The massacre was recorded in the diary of Edward Henty, first permanent settler in the Port Phillip district who began whaling and sheep farming in the area in late 1834, and is also mentioned in the journals of George Augustus Robinson, the Protector of Aborigines in the region.

== Ongoing conflict (late 1830s) ==
In 1837 settlers in the Portland Bay District appealed to Governor Bourke for protection from attacks by Aborigines. In 1838 a group of 82 settlers threatened to declare a 'black war' if authorities did not give them further protection. A report was also made by Dr Collier at Portland that rapes and massacres of the local Indigenous people in the region was occurring. In October 1838, after a shepherd was killed at Francis Henty's Merino Downs property, a large number of local Aboriginal people were reportedly massacred along the nearby Wannon River. Likewise, men working for Samuel Winter's neighbouring property were involved in several skirmishes with the local residents. During this period the Murdering Gully massacre also took place (1839, with 35-40 Aboriginal people killed), and another massacre reported at a track called Waterloo Lane.

== Escalation (1840-41) ==
British colonisation of the area intensified from 1840 and conflict worsened. The Whyte brothers started taking land around the modern day Coleraine region in early 1840 and were soon involved in two large massacres of Aboriginal people, namely the Fighting Hills massacre and the Fighting Waterholes massacre. George Winter shot dead five native people at Tahara, while Arthur Pileau of Hilgay on the Wannon River openly admitted that he shot "natives to get rid of them" and usually did so one-by-one instead of mass killings to avoid publicity. Charles Wedge established The Grange property and he and his neighbouring colonists spent much of 1840 in constant warfare with the local Aboriginal population that did not end until, as Wedge himself wrote: "many lives were sacrified and...many thousands of sheep destroyed." Wedge had a swivel gun mounted outside his homestead which was put to use during the conflict. Thomas Connell, the manager of Edward Henty's Sandford property resorted to mass poisoning to remove the local people. In November 1840, around 16 people died in agony after Connell gave them damper laced with arsenic. The names of some of those poisoned were Tolort, Yangolarri, Bokarareep and Coroitleek.

In May 1840, Patrick Codd a settler who was employed by John Cox at the Mount Rouse property was killed by a group of Aboriginal men assumed to have been led by Alkapurata (also known as Rodger). Codd's death forced the colonial authorities to take formal action with Captain Foster Fyans of the Border Police and James Blair, a Police Magistrate, being sent to the region enforce order. Protectors of Aborigines were also tasked with conciliating the native population and encouraging them to relocate to a reserve near Terang. However, these deployments had significant delays and John Cox, who was the grandson of noted colonist William Cox, in the meantime led a large punitive expedition against the local Aboriginal clans and killed around 20 people.

In 1841, the Gunditjmara killed another settler in Francis Morton, who was hacked to death along with his servant William Lawrence near the Glenelg River. Pioneer colonist of the Portland region, Edward Henty, and the new Police Magistrate for the area, James Blair, said in a meeting with George Augustus Robinson (the Chief Protector of Aborigines) that they thought the local Aboriginal people were barely human and that soldiers should be brought in to shoot whole tribes along the Glenelg. The region's government surveyor, Charles Tyers, had shot a number of Gunditjmara at one of the Glenelg's tributaries called the Crawford River. Surviving members of the Wollorerer clan who lived along the Glenelg spoke to Robinson saying that "plenty shoot him white man, plenty all gone this tribe." It was made apparent to the Protector that the few remaining of the clan were mostly girls kept alive by the whites for sexual purposes. One of the girls' names was Narracort.

Killings occurred elsewhere in the region during this year with reports made public that Robert Tulloh of Bochara station would ride out on Sundays and "hunt down blacks and shoot them like kangaroos." An investigation led by James Blair cleared him of any wrongdoing, even though Tulloh and other colonists admitted to partaking in other punitive expeditions which resulted in many casualties of Aboriginal people. On one of these excursions, a servant of Tulloh's abducted an Aboriginal boy, later kicking him to death. After many cattle were speared on the Bolden brothers' property on the Hopkins River, Sandford Bolden shot and killed a local inhabitant named Totkiere and his wife. Their orphan son escaped to the Aboriginal Protector, Charles Sievwright, who reported the event to the authorities. Bolden faced court in Melbourne in December 1841 but the judge threw the case out, dismissing the accusations against him as "hearsay evidence procured at second hand from the blacks."

== Border Police enter the conflict (1842) ==
After a lengthy delay, Foster Fyans, the Commissioner of Crown Lands for the Portland District, was able to organise a force of paramilitary Border Police troopers to bring order to the region. By the start of 1842, severe loss of stock and killing of shepherds by Aboriginal people was centred around land acquired along the Eumeralla River and it was to this area that Fyans proceeded. His troopers were involved in skirmishes where several Gunditjmara were killed but some of the police were severely wounded and the force had to withdraw.

The wider conflict continued unabated in its viciousness. In response to the local inhabitants killing livestock on his Tarrone landholding, Dr James Kilgour organised a number of punitive expeditions killing several Aboriginal people. The overseer at Tarrone also gave poisoned flour to a group of Gunditjmara, killing nine people. George Augustus Robinson later observed six survivors of this mass poisoning who were still unable to walk due to the effects.

At Caramut, a leasehold held by Thomas Osbrey and Sidney Smith, an infamous massacre named the Lubra Creek massacre occurred on 24 February 1842. Three women (one of whom was pregnant) and a child were shot dead, and another woman died later of wounds. Because the victims included women and children, and the attack was unprovoked—the group were not found with sheep nor western clothing, and the families were asleep at the time—the massacre was widely condemned. Three of the men involved in the attack, Richard Hill, Joseph Betts and John Beswicke, were tried the following year at the Supreme Court in Melbourne but were found not guilty by the jury.

In March 1842, colonists from the Port Fairy area wrote a letter to then superintendent of the Port Phillip District, Charles La Trobe requesting further support from Melbourne for the damage to people and property in the area. The superintendent, who had a knowledge of the Lubra Creek massacre, responded:

The destruction of European property, and even the occasional sacrifice of life, by the hands of the savage tribes among whom you live, if unprovoked and unrevenged, may justly claim sympathy and pity. But the feeling of abhorrence which one act of savage retaliation or cruelty on your part will rouse, must weaken, if not altogether obliterate every other, in the minds of most men; and I regret to state, that I have before me a statement in a form which I dare not discredit, showing that such acts are perpetrated among you.

La Trobe describes the nighttime 'murder of no fewer than three defenceless aboriginal women and a child in their sleeping-place'.

The colonists' petition to La Trobe included a list of their losses that 'principally occurred' in February and March 1842.

Alleged damages caused by Indigenous people around the Eumeralla River Feb-March 1842
| Name of complainant | Settlers killed | Settlers injured | Animals taken | Weapons taken | Other items |
|---|---|---|---|---|---|
| Mr. Ritchie | 1 | | 100 sheep | 1 | 2 huts cleared |
| Mr. Campbell | | | 200 sheep | | 10 tons of potatoes |
| Messrs. Kilsom and Bernard | | 2 | 5 horses; with 7 cows and 40 calves killed | | |
| Mr. Loughnan | | | 600 sheep taken, 130 recovered | 2 | 2 huts cleared |
| Messrs. Bolden | | 1 | 10 cows and 40 calves killed | | |
| Mr. Whitehead | | 2 | 1 flock of sheep, mostly recovered | | |
| Mr. Muston | | 1 | 200 sheep | | |
| Mr. Burchet | | | | | Shepherd fired at |
| Mr. Cox | | 1 | 2 horses, flock of sheep | | |
| Mr. Hunter | | | 1 flock of sheep | | huts robbed |
| Messrs. Hutcheson and Kid | 1 | | | | |
| Messrs. Carmichael and Jamieson | | | 1 horse | | |
| Messrs. Kemp | | | 30 sheep | | |
| Mr Farie | | | 50 sheep | | |
| Captain Webster | | 1 | 350 sheep | | |
| Mr. Black | | | 50 sheep | | |
| Mr. Thompson | 1 | | 260 sheep | | |
| Mr. Gill | | | 300 sheep | | |
| Mr. Cameron | | | 700 sheep, mostly recovered | | |
| Mr. Bromfield | | 1 | 180 sheep | | station robbed |
| Mr. Faloye | | | 1 'very valuable bull', some calves | | |
| Dr. Martin | | | 6 cows, 3 bullocks, 20 calves | | |
| Dr. Woolley | 1 | | | | Cattle driven off |
| Mr. Aylman | | | 200 ewes and lambs | | |
| Mr. Barnet | | | 450 ewes and lambs | | |

Perhaps in response to this petition, Foster Fyans returned to the Port Fairy region with a larger force of 14 Border Police troopers in April 1842. They were able to kill a number of resistance leaders and capture three others, namely Jupiter, Cocknose and Alkapurata. These men were sent for trial in Melbourne. The first two were released, while Alkapurata was found guilty of the earlier murder of Patrick Codd and hanged to death outside Melbourne Gaol on 5 September 1842.

After his release, Jupiter returned to the region and led further sheep-stealing campaigns in August against the British. Samuel MacGregor, the manager at the main sheep station targeted by Jupiter, led a punitive expedition in which they recovered the sheep and killed at least three Aboriginal warriors. Violence also continued around the Portland area with colonist Donald McKenzie and his hutkeeper being speared to death by a man named Koort Kirrup on McKenzie's run at Hotspur.

In light of these ongoing conflicts, La Trobe ordered Fyans back to the region in September with a full complement of Border Police troopers together with an additional force of ten Native Police troopers under the command of Captain Henry EP Dana. La Trobe wanted Fyans to "take the most decided measures to put a check to these disorders."

== Clashes with Native Police (1843) ==
In 1843, the Native Police were brought in from Melbourne to take part in fighting against other Aboriginal people which included attacks upon the Gunditjmara and Jardwadjali at the Crawford River, Mt Eckersley, Victoria Range and at Mt Zero. Henry EP Dana was the commander of the Native Police Corps and encouraged the police to shoot rather than make arrests. Under the white Sergeant Windridge the Corps were engaged in a number of violent and fatal engagements.

In 1843, a skirmish broke out between the Corps and local Aboriginal people with a large number of stolen sheep. The fight continued all night. During the fight, information came that Basset the owner of the sheep had been murdered and 200 sheep had gone. 8 or 9 Aboriginal men were shot.

19 October 1843, Mr Lockhart's dray had been attacked and robbed, in the attempt to recover the stolen items and arrest some of the men responsible resulted in 2 local Aboriginal men being killed.

Another search during this tour of duty led to more deaths. One of the troopers was recorded by Assistant Protector William Thomas as claiming 17 Aboriginal men had been killed, though this number was later disputed.

It was about this time that T.A. Browne settled at the property he called Squattesmere. T.A. Browne became a popular author, writing as Rolf Boldrewood, and wrote a chapter about the Eumeralla war in his book Old Melbourne Memories (1896).

Before I arrived and took up my abode on the border of the great Eumeralla mere, there had been divers quarrels between the old race and the new. Whether the stockmen and shepherds were to blame—as is always said—or whether it was simply the ordinary savage desire for the tempting goods and chattels of the white man, cannot be accurately stated. Anyhow, cattle and sheep had been lifted and speared; blacks had been shot, as a matter of course; then, equally so, hut-keepers, shepherds, and stockmen had been done to death.

== Later conflict ==
Settlers went on 'hunting parties', for example 13 hunting parties described by the writer and diarist Annie Baxter of Yambuk in 1845-1847.

Gunditjmara Elder Aunty Iris Lovett-Gardiner from Lake Condah recalled the information passed down to her from her family who had survived:

there was massacres all over the place but they probably weren’t recorded, because they had a shooting board that they had with Aboriginal people…they went out an’ they shot ‘em an’ they come from every where to have a shoot against the Aboriginal race…an’ they shot women, kids and everything else…an’ that wasn’t…you know they wouldn’t say how many they shot, they wouldn’t put that down, because it was sport to them, it was like shooting animals…

The last massacre was at Murder's Flats in the early 1850s (though see Dhauwurd Wurrung History for difficulties with this date). Another proposed final date is 1859 for the Lake Bolac massacre of 11 people.

== Displacement ==
Many Aboriginal people were displaced by the settlers, and the Victorian Government created Aboriginal reserves to house them; some were moved to Lake Condah Mission after its establishment in 1867.

== In the arts ==
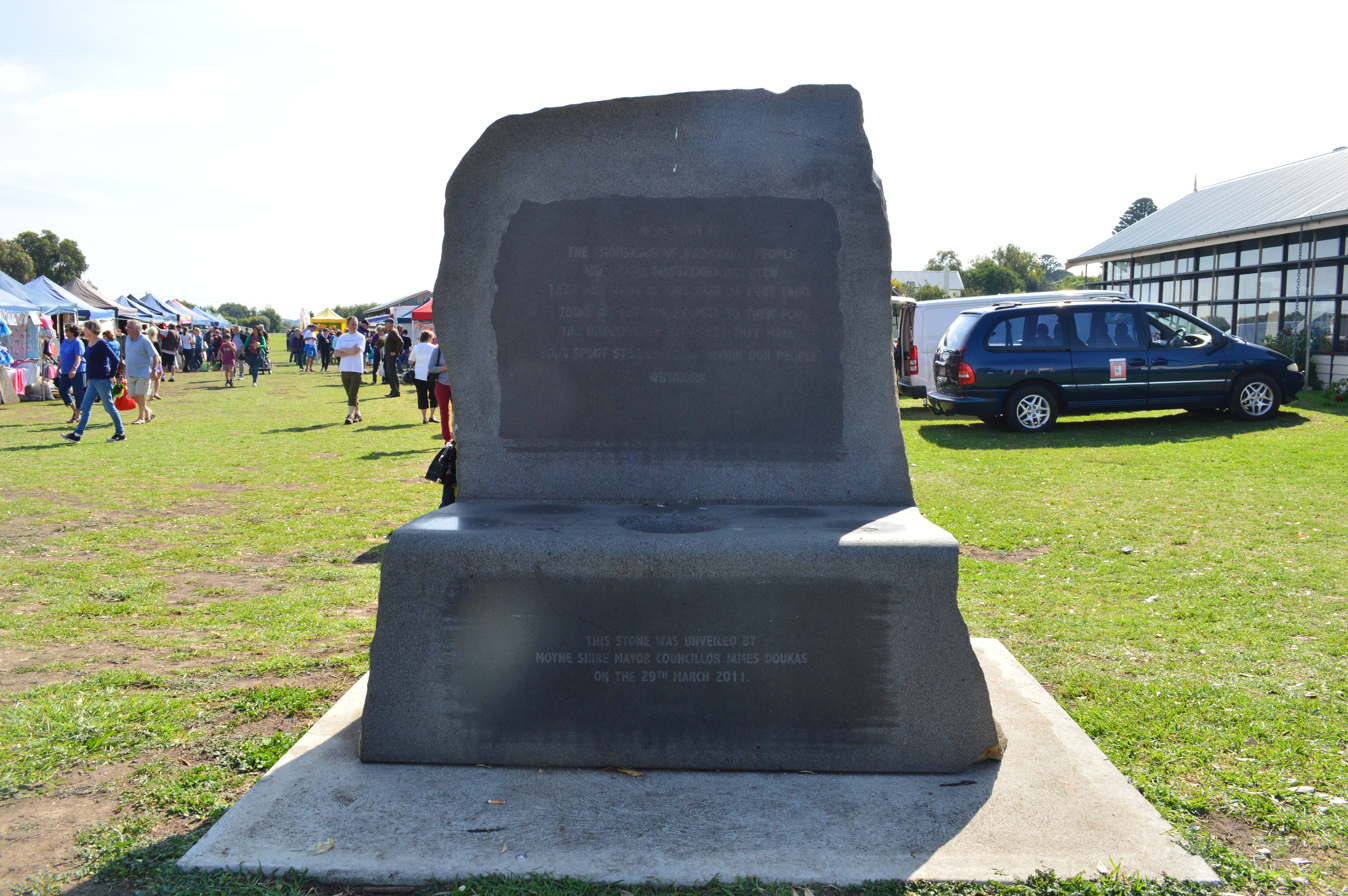
Port Fairy Aboriginal Massacre Monument

Deborah Cheetham AO wrote Eumeralla: A War Requiem for Peace based on the Eumeralla Wars. The work was performed in Port Fairy and Melbourne in 2019.

In 2019 Indigenous artist and writer Rachael Joy created a series of paintings based on the Eumeralla Wars, which she describes as "like my Guernica" (referring to the famous painting of the horrors of war by Pablo Picasso).

A monument was unveiled in 2011 in "memory of the thousands of Aboriginal people who were massacred between 1837 and 1844 in this area of Port Fairy".

== See also ==
- List of massacres in Australia
- List of massacres of Indigenous Australians
- Australian frontier wars
