= Yambuk =

- Town
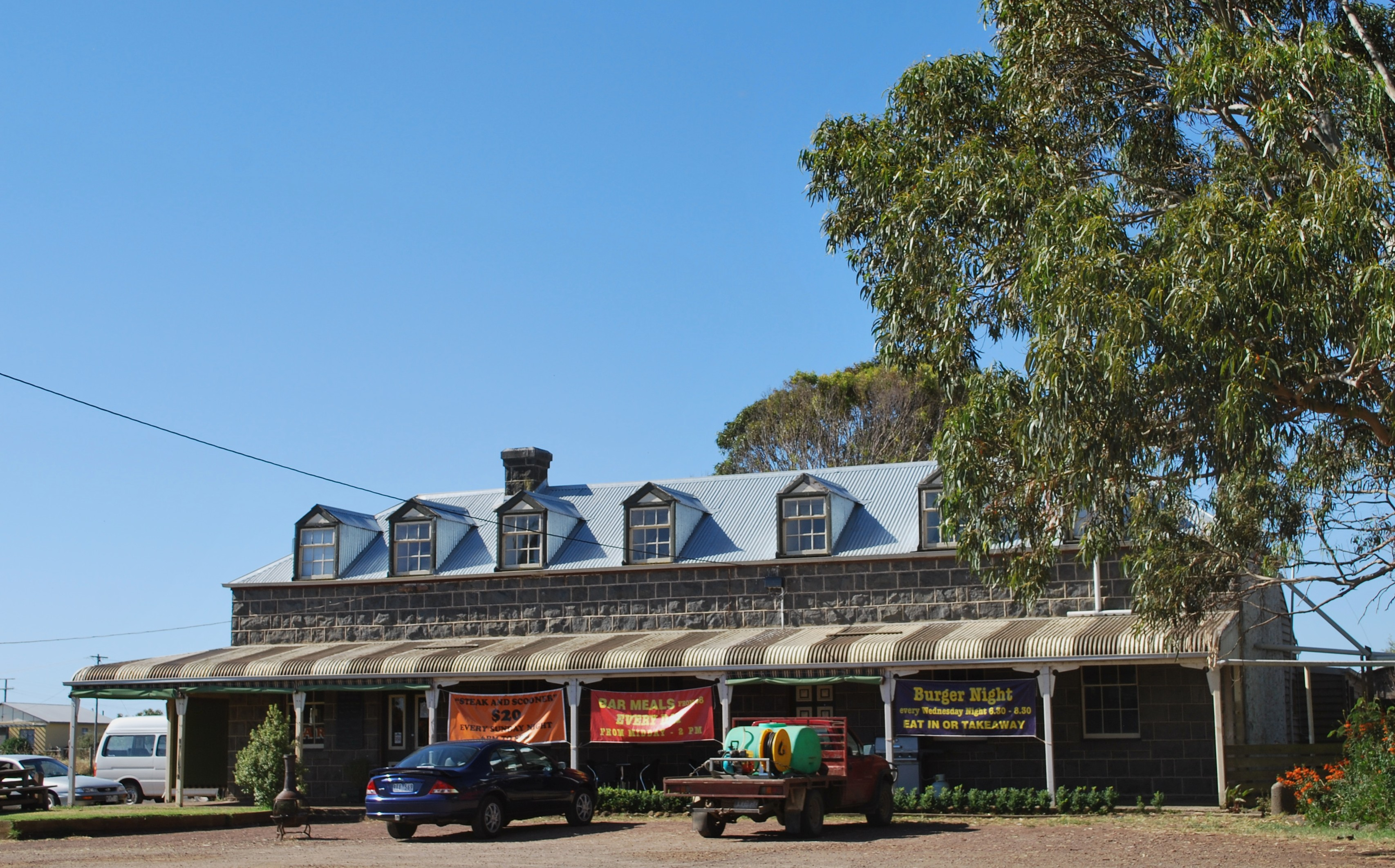
- Yambuk Hotel

- Coordinates: 38°18′0″S 142°03′0″E
- Country: Australia
- State: Victoria
- LGA: Shire of Moyne
- Location: 296 km (184 mi) W of Melbourne; 46 km (29 mi) W of Warrnambool; 18 km (11 mi) W of Port Fairy

Population
  - Total: 267 (2016 census)
- Postcode: 3285

Yambuk /ˈjæmbʌk/ is a town in Victoria, Australia. The Yambuk township was established in the 1850s, and the Post Office opened on 1 March 1859. Yambuk is sited where the Princes Highway crosses the Shaw River. At the 2006 census, the town and surrounding area had a population of 540. The 2016 census recorded a population of 267.

The name Yambuk is a word from the language of the local indigenous inhabitants, thought to mean "red kangaroo", "full moon" or "big water".

Shell middens in the limestone cliffs to the east of the town indicate that Aboriginal people had lived in the area for at least 2300 years.

== Traditional ownership ==
The formally recognised traditional owners of the area in which Yambuk is located are the Eastern Maar people in the western portion and the Gunditjmara people in the eastern portion, who are represented by the Eastern Maar Aboriginal Corporation (EMAC) and the Gunditj Mirring Traditional Owners Aboriginal Corporation (GMTOAC).

== European settlement ==
European settlement began in the area when Lieutenant Andrew Baxter and his wife Annie Baxter squatted on the Yambuck pastoral run in 1843.

Annie Baxter's diary notes 13 occasions where European settlers formed armed and mounted hunting parties to attack and harass the Gunditjmara people. Those events were part of the significant conflict between Aboriginal people and Europeans that occurred around Yambuk at the time.

Some of the most violent clashes in the Western District of Victoria took place near the Shaw River and the Eumeralla River. That conflict, known as the Eumeralla wars, occurred from the 1840s until about 1860.

In 1921, legislation was passed in the Victorian Parliament authorising the extension of the Port Fairy railway line to Yambuk, a distance of 11 1/2 miles (18.5 km). Work on the extension never began.

Lake Yambuk and the Yambuk Important Bird Area lie between the town and the coast. Near the lake is the 33-metre-long Yambuk Slide.

Yambuk is the site of Pacific Blue's Yambuk Wind Farm and the adjacent Codrington Wind Farm.
