= Yambuk Important Bird Area =

Important Bird Area in Victoria, Australia

Coordinates: 38°19′12″S 142°02′01″E

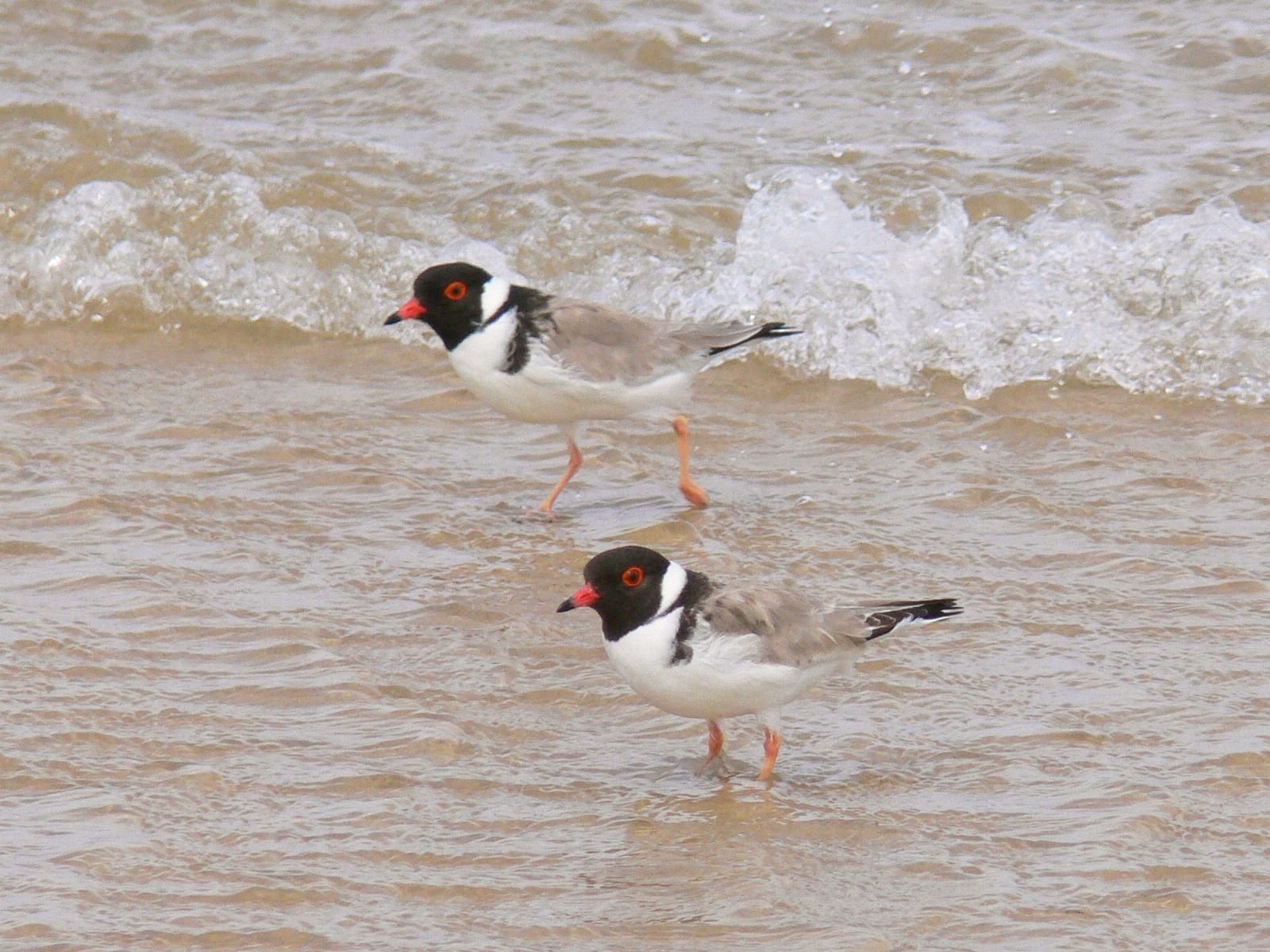
The IBA is an important site for hooded plovers

The Yambuk Important Bird Area comprises a 10 km^{2} tract of coastal land fronting Bass Strait in south-western Victoria, south-eastern Australia. It lies some 20 km west of the town of Port Fairy and encompasses the lower reaches of the Eumeralla River and Lake Yambuk.

== Description ==
The site lies near the small town of Yambuk. Lake Yambuk is an estuarine lagoon which receives freshwater inflows from the Shaw and Eumeralla Rivers and, when open, from tidal seawater. When the mouth of the estuary is closed by a build-up of silt, the lake is flooded by freshwater until the entrance is opened mechanically. As well as the lake, the site contains associated wetland vegetation and adjacent protected areas which have suitable habitat for orange-bellied parrots – the Yambuk Nature Conservation Reserve and the Deen Maar Indigenous Protected Area.

=== Flora ===
The coastal part of the site is dominated by dune shrubland featuring coast wattle and coastal beard-heath with scattered emergent trees. Behind the dune scrub the margins of the lake support saltmarsh and reed beds and other forms of wetland vegetation, with patches of closed swamp scrub and low open eucalypt woodland on the northern, inland side. The threatened coast ballart, is present.

=== Fauna ===
The site has been identified as an Important Bird Area (IBA) by BirdLife International because it supports a wintering population of critically endangered orange-bellied parrots, a breeding population of hooded plovers, and has regular records of Australasian bitterns. The Eumeralla River is a stronghold for the threatened dwarf galaxias.
