= Henry Dana =

Australian police chief

Henry Edmund Pulteney Dana
- Born: 1820
- Died: 24 November 1852 (aged 31–32)
- Occupation: Policeman
- Military career
- Allegiance: British-Australian
- Branch: Australian Native Police Corps

Henry Edmund Pulteney Dana (1820–1852) was an Australian police officer who established the Native Police Corps in the Port Phillip District (later Victoria) in 1842. Dana was also responsible for two massacres of Aboriginal people: one at Barmah Lake in 1843, and the other at Snowy River in 1846.

== Biography ==
Dana was born in England, his father being Captain William Pulteney Dana of the 6th Regiment. Henry Dana migrated to Van Diemen's Land (later Tasmania) in 1840, but in 1842 he relocated to the Port Phillip District where he renewed acquaintance with Superintendent Charles La Trobe, whom he had met briefly in London. The two men became firm friends and Latrobe appointed Dana to establish a native police corps.

Twenty-five Aborigines from various Gippsland tribes were enlisted at the depot at Narre Warren, and trained for mounted police duty by Dana and his second-in-command, Dudley Le Souef, under the general supervision of the assistant protector of Aborigines, William Thomas. Dana's police force lasted longer than the original corps set up by Christiaan de Villiers in 1837, partly because Dana made some allowances for the Aborigines' traditional way of life. For example, during summer the troopers were generally allowed to rejoin their communities to take part in cultural activities.

The Corps was controversial due to Dana's emphasis on the use of deadly force, rather than arrest. For example, one trooper is reported to have said: "Captain say big one stupid catch them very good shoot them, you blackfellows, no shoot them me hand cuff you and send you to jail." The Native Police Corps is estimated to have killed 125 indigenous Australians between 1835 and 1850. Specific massacres of Aboriginal people include the LaTrobe Valley, Barmah Lake, and Snowy River massacres.

Dana made no real use of the tracking skills of his troops and used them in the more traditional role of mounted police. While they proved useful to the pastoralists who were rapidly taking over traditional Aboriginal land, requiring Aborigines to arrest and even shoot down their own people proved demoralising for both sides.

=== Aboriginal massacres ===
Dana was responsible for a massacre at Barmah Lake in 1843, during which around 26 Aboriginal people were killed and Dana was speared in the thigh. The official report did not mention the murders and, when challenged on the truthfulness of the report, Dana's reply was that "persons unconnected with the public service know nothing of reports ... being apt to blurt out statements more properly held in reserve." On January 5, 1844, a man called Allan, called at G.A. Robinson's office in Melbourne and told him

...a number of men also women were shot by Dana's party at the Murry [sic] and children were knocked on the head with carrabines [sic]. They first sent out a party to look for the natives and then went and planted themselves in a scrub and sent two or three troopers to round or drive them like sheep to be large party carrelled; then they commenced firing and shot some of them in the river. Dana told me he had a brush with the natives. He went to the Murry [sic] by the Campaspe and returned said 20 men, one woman, five children were shot. Kelsh's overseer told me that he, Dana, said he would turn the natives out. (Robinson 5 Jan 1844).

In 1844, Dana sent a letter to La Trobe reporting that he had just completed a second tour of the district, in which he stated: "from observation and information this part of the Province is perfectly free from any thing like outrages by the blacks..."

Dana was responsible for a massacre at Snowy River on 16 December 1846, where 15 Tatungalung or Krauatungulung were murdered. According to historian A.G.L. Shaw, the number killed was between 15 and 23.

When the Gold Rush began in Victoria in 1851, the Native Police Corps was the only organised government force in the areas to which miners began to flock, and so it was used to enforce the authority of the early goldfields commissioners. However, Dana antagonised the gold diggers at Ballarat in September 1851 with his rigorous attempt to collect the first licence fees.

On 24 November 1852, Dana died of pneumonia, having suffered severe exposure while on a search for bushrangers, and the corps was disbanded early in 1853. Dana was married and had four children. Dana Street in Ballarat is named after him.
