= Eumeralla River =

Eumeralla Blackfellows Creek, Blackmans Creek
- Location of the Eumeralla River mouth in Victoria

Location
- Country: Australia
- State: Victoria
- Region: Victorian Midlands, Naracoorte Coastal Plain (IBRA), Western District
- Local government area: Glenelg Shire
- Town: Macarthur

Physical characteristics
- Source
  - location: northeast of Macarthur
  - coordinates: 37°55′18″S 142°9′32″E
  - elevation: 216 m (709 ft)
- Mouth: Portland Bay, Great Australian Bight
  - location: south of Yambuk
  - coordinates: 38°20′23″S 142°2′45″E
  - elevation: 0 m (0 ft)
- Length: 78 km (48 mi)

Basin features
- River system: Glenelg Hopkins catchment
- Tributaries
  - right: Deep Creek (Eumeralla, Victoria), Breakfast Creek (Eumeralla, Victoria), Middle Creek (Eumeralla, Victoria), Shaw River
- Lake: Lake Yambuk

The Eumeralla River is a perennial river of the Glenelg Hopkins catchment, located in the Western District of Victoria, Australia.

== Course and features ==
The Eumeralla River rises northeast of Macarthur, and flows generally south, and then west through the town of Macarthur, before heading south by west until the settlement of Codrington where the river flows east parallel with the coastline, joined by four tributaries including the Shaw River. The Eumeralla empties into Lake Yambuk at the Yambuk Important Bird Area and reaches its mouth south of Yambuk and spills into Portland Bay in the Great Australian Bight. The river descends 217 metres (712 ft) over its 78-kilometre (48 mi) course.

== Etymology ==
The river lends its name to the Eumeralla Wars, a notable conflict of the 1840s between European settlers and the traditional Gunditjmara Aboriginal inhabitants of the land surrounding the river.

== See also ==
- List of rivers of Australia § Victoria
- Thomas Alexander Browne
