= Western District (Victoria) =

- Region
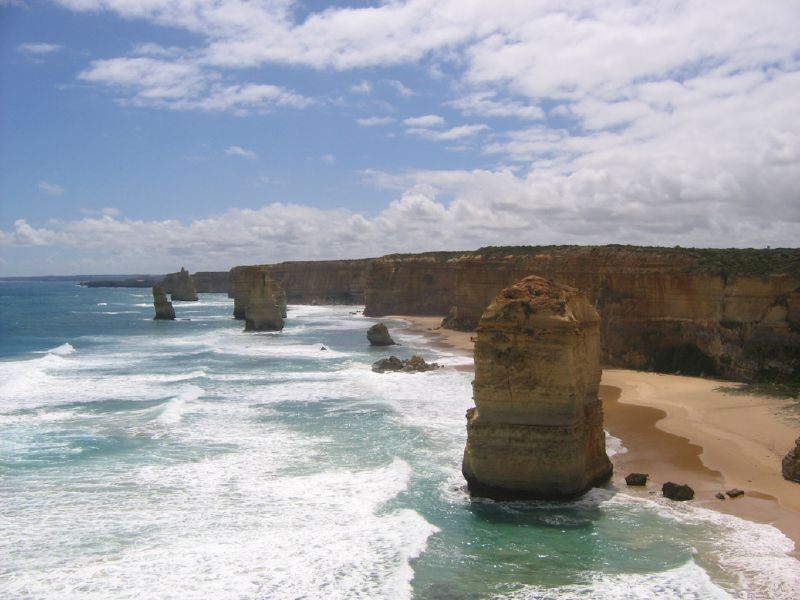
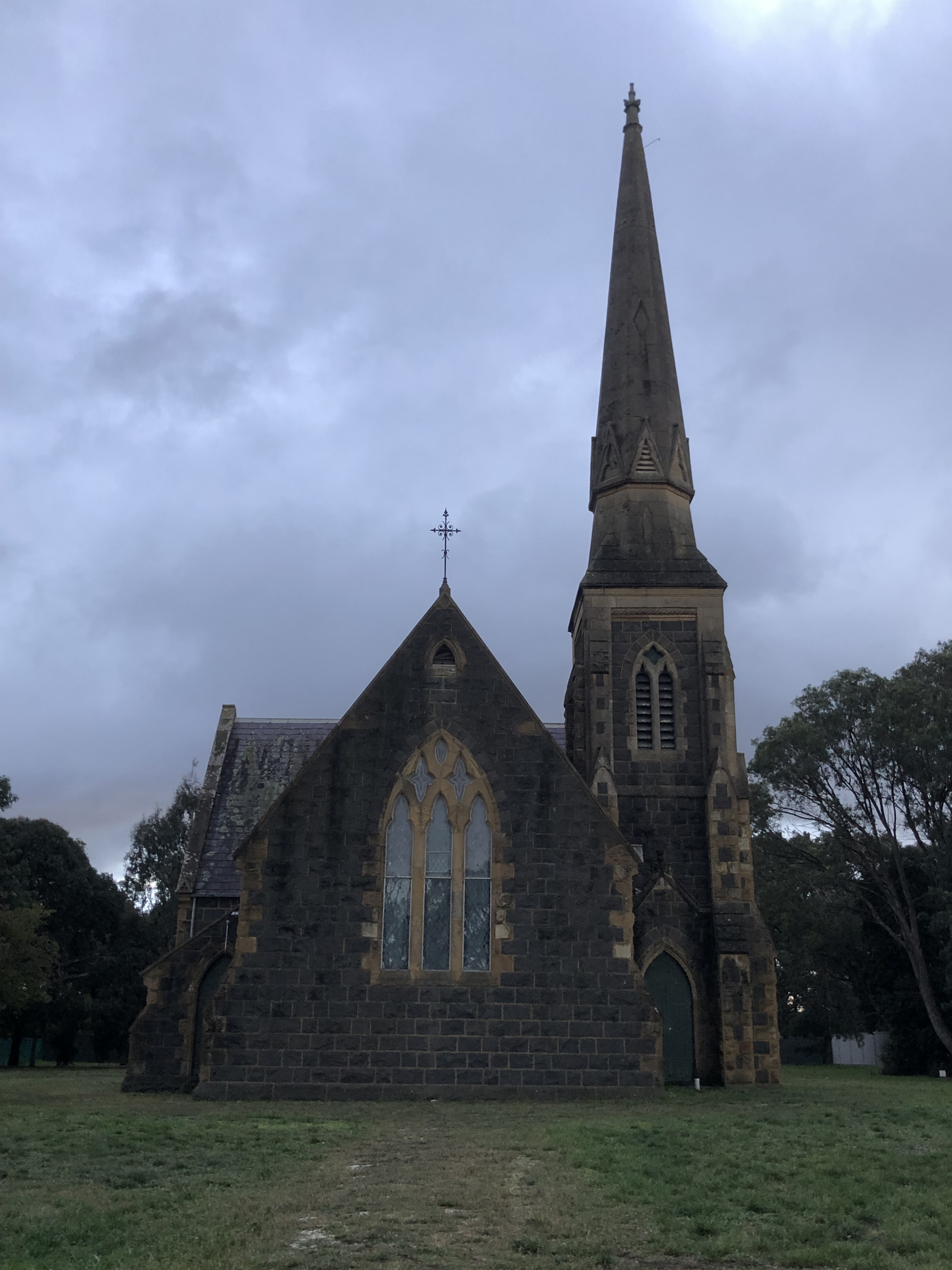
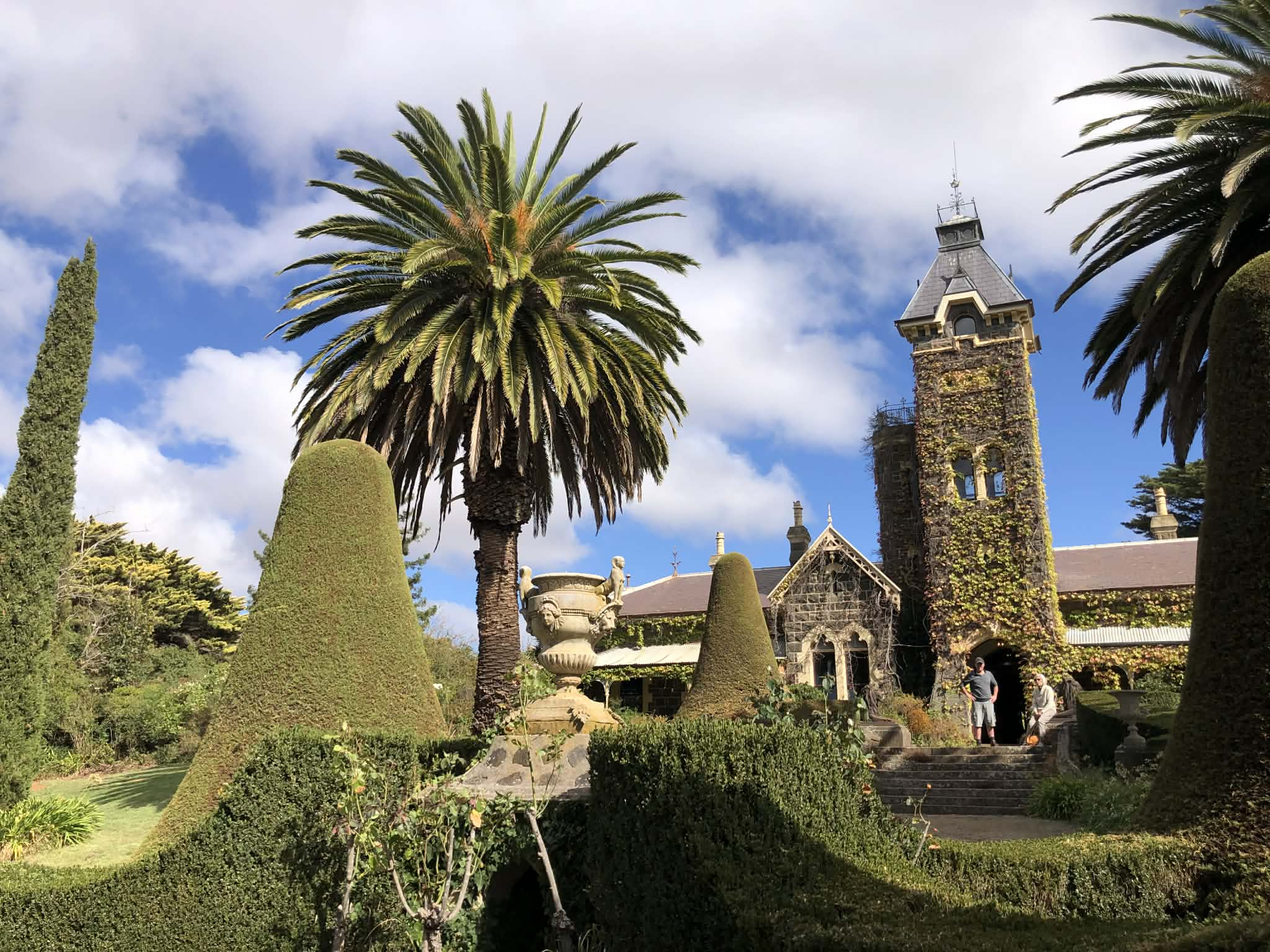
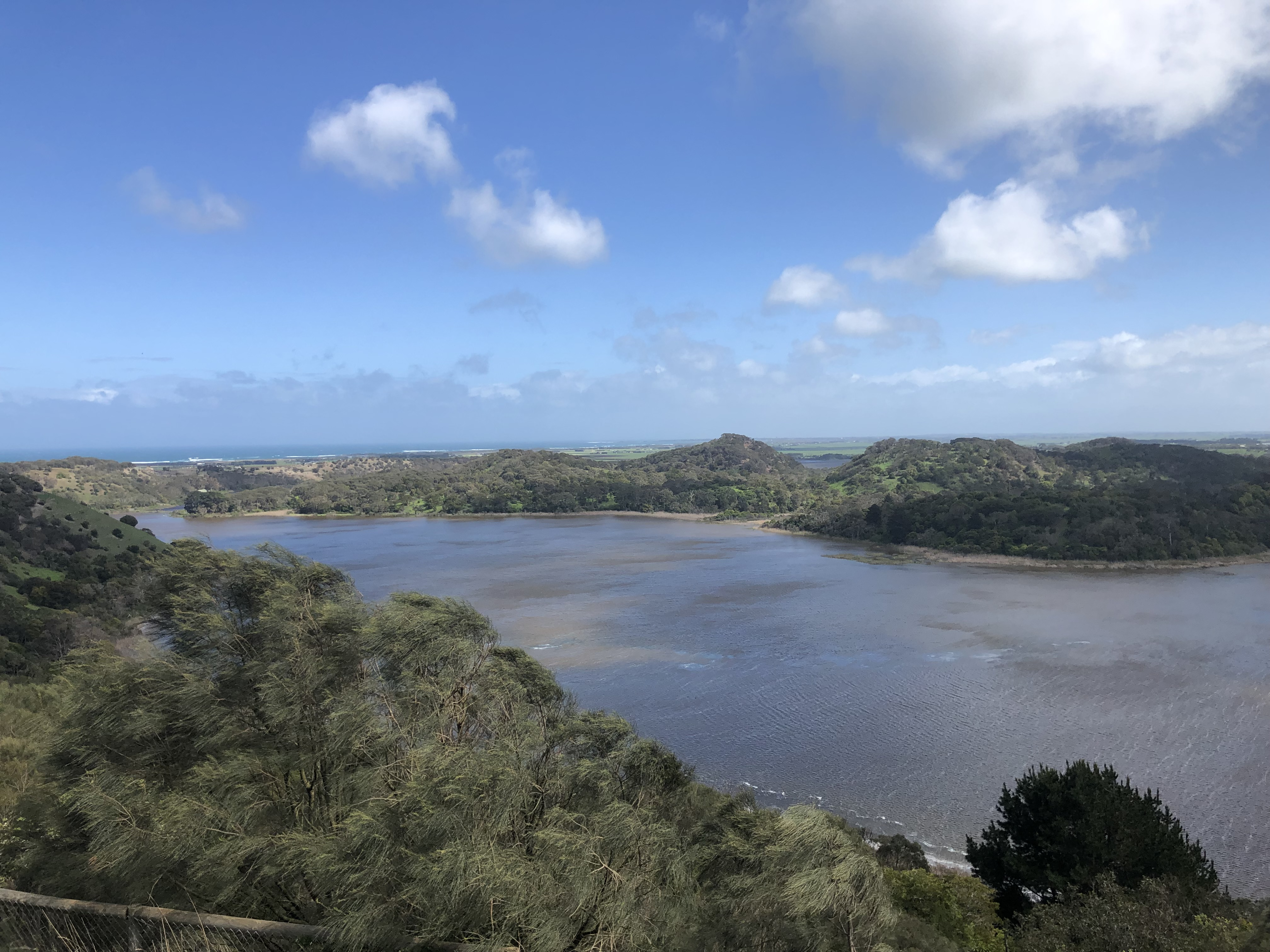
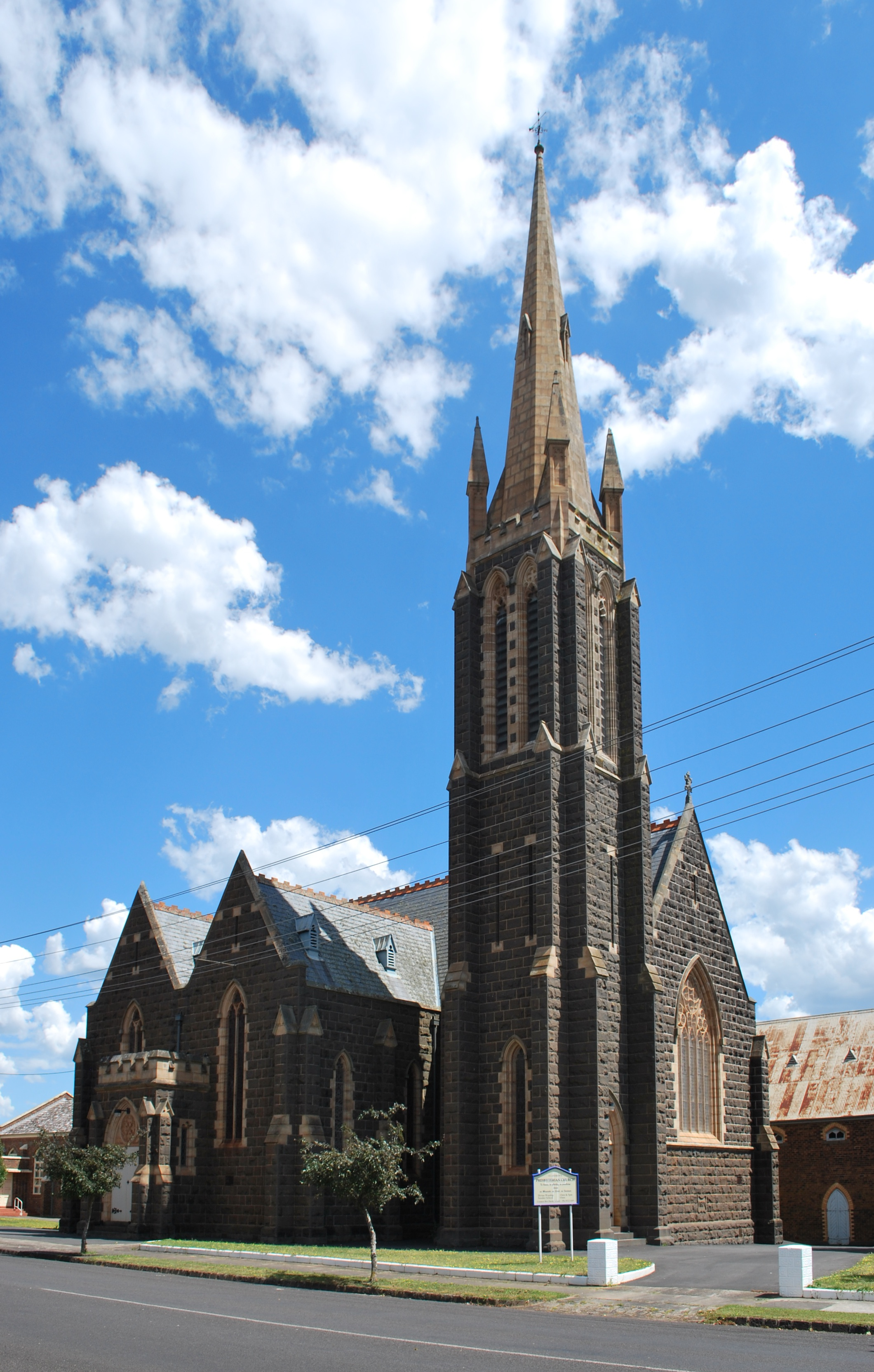
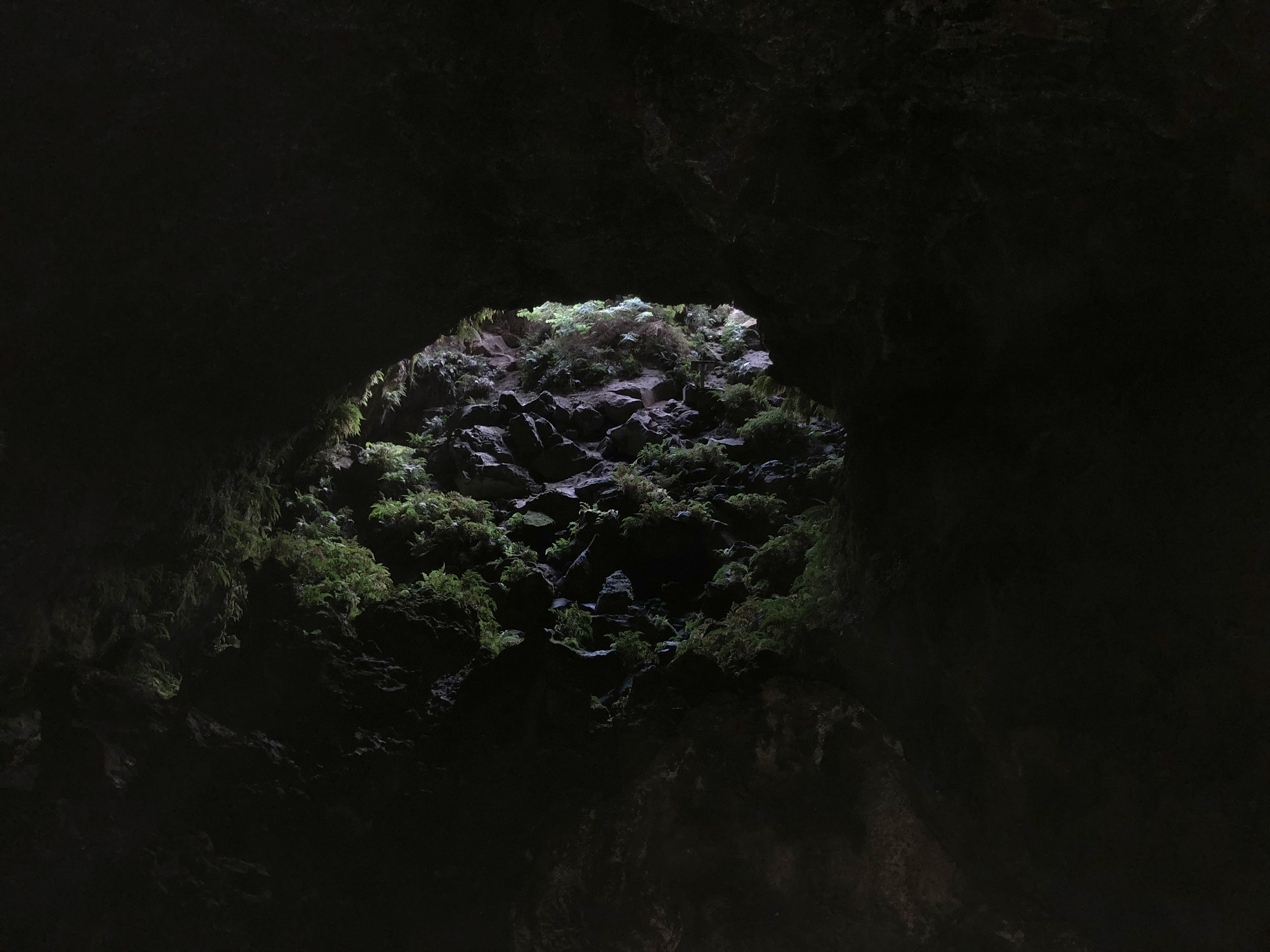
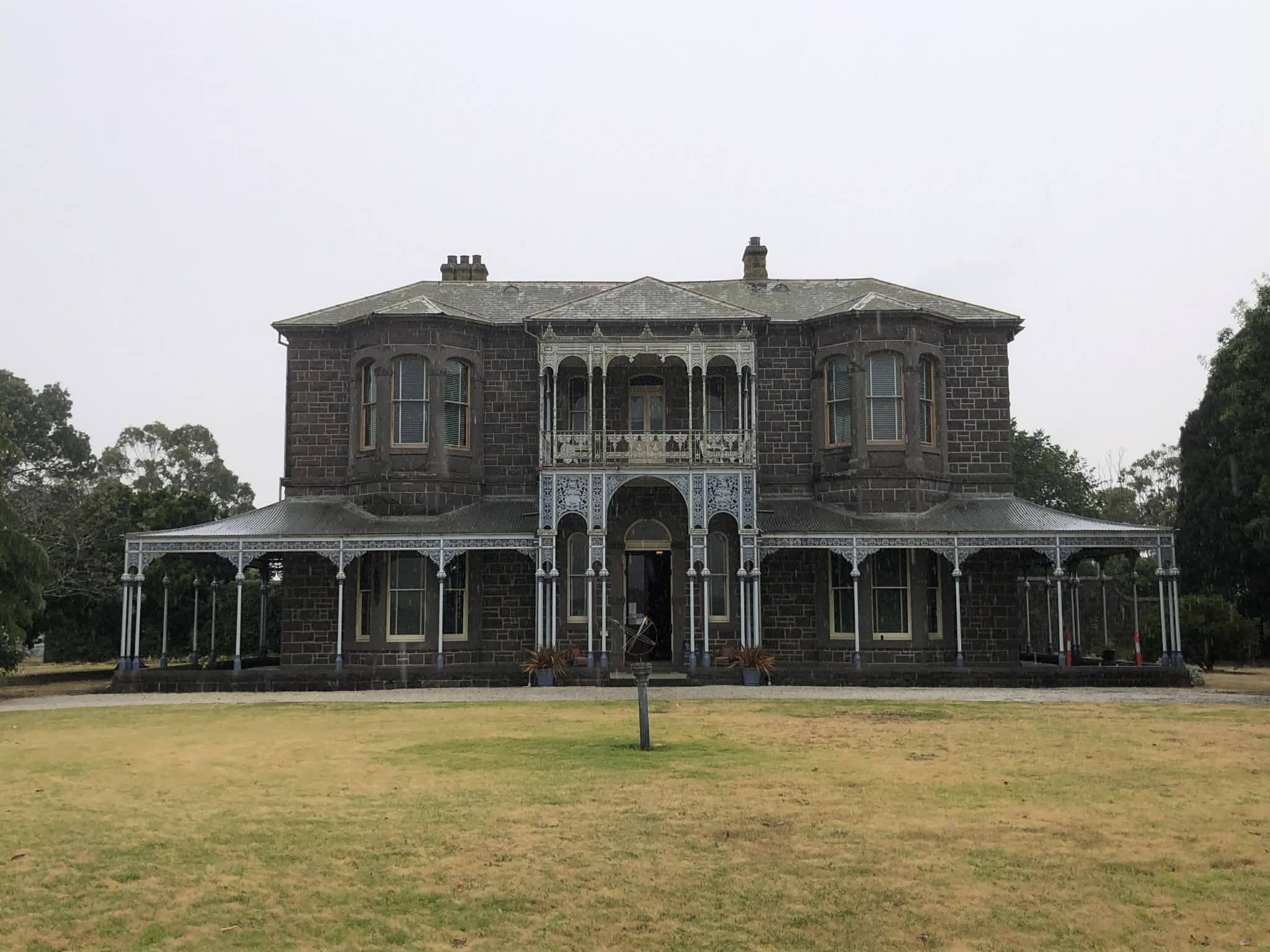
- The Twelve Apostles Rokewood Uniting Church Narrapumelap Tower Hill St Andrew's Presbyterian Church Byaduk Caves Barwon Park
- Country: Australia
- State: Victoria
- Region: Barwon South West (part); Grampians (part)
- LGAs: Ararat City; Glenelg; Moyne; Southern Grampians

Government
  - State electorate: Lowan, Polwarth, Ripon, South-West Coast
  - Federal division: Wannon
Regions around Western District
South Australia	Wimmera	Goldfields
South Australia	Western District	Goldfields
Southern Ocean	Bass Strait	Bass Strait

The Western District comprises western regions of the Australian state of Victoria. It is said to be an ill–defined district, sometimes incorrectly referred to as an economic region. The district is located within parts of the Barwon South West and the Grampians regions; extending from the south-west corner of the state to Ballarat in the east and as far north as Ararat. The district is bounded by the Wimmera district in the north, by the Goldfields district in the east, by Bass Strait and the Southern Ocean in the south, and by the South Australian border in the west. The district is well known for the production of wool. The most populated city in the Western District is the Ballarat region, with 96,940 inhabitants.

The principal centres of the district are: Warrnambool, Hamilton, Colac, Portland, Casterton, Port Fairy, Camperdown, and Terang. Other cities and towns in or on the edge of the district include: Coleraine, Merino, Heywood, Dunkeld, Penshurst, Macarthur, Koroit, Allansford, Ararat, Willaura, Beaufort, Learmonth, Ballarat, Snake Valley, Skipton, Moyston, Linton, Derrinallum, Lismore, Mortlake, Noorat, Cobden, Timboon, Beeac, Cororooke, Birregurra, Apollo Bay, and Lorne.

== Geology ==
It consists of a nearly flat volcanic plain created by a number of quite recently active volcanoes, the best known being Mount Eccles, Mount Richmond and Mount Gambier. Whilst some of them (e.g. Mount Richmond) have given rise to cemented pyroclastic rocks that do not produce fertile soils, others have given rise to fertile andisols that make the district the best grazing land in Australia, as well as highly suitable for the production of vegetable crops. Away from the volcanoes, soils are of moderate to low fertility and many are sandy, supporting heathland flora like the Grampians. Drainage is very poor and most rivers flow only after prolonged periods of steady rain, resulting in remarkably variable flow when the low variability of the climate is taken into account. The major mountain range is the Otway Ranges, which straddle the boundary between the Western District and Port Phillip District.

== Climate ==
The climate is mild to warm and generally humid to sub-humid. Summer temperatures are warm, with February means ranging from 13.1 to 21.9 °C (55.6 to 71.4 °F) at Portland to 11.1 to 26.6 °C (52.0 to 79.9 °F) in the northern part of the plain. Rainfall in summer is not uncommon but is only rarely heavy; though in March 1946 rains of up to 300 millimetres (12 in) in a week constitute easily the heaviest falls in the district. In winter, temperatures typically range from minima of around 5 °C (41 °F) to maxima of 12 to 13 °C (54 to 55 °F), and rainfall is very frequent and reliable, averaging from 550 mm (22 in) in the driest area around Lake Bolac to 832 mm (32.8 in) at Portland. In the Otway Ranges, summers are mild, averaging around 20 °C (68 °F), whilst winters are cold and very wet, with maxima averaging around 9 to 10 °C (48 to 50 °F) and rainfall averaging about 2,250 mm (89 in) with extremes in June 1952 as high as 538 mm (21.2 in) at Weeaproinah and a Victorian record 891 mm (35.1 in) at nearby Tanybryn.

== History ==
=== Aboriginal history and early European contact ===
The Western District was well-populated by Aboriginal Victorians at the time colonisation began. For example, the ancestors of the Gunditjmara people lived in villages of weather-proof houses with stone walls a metre high, located near eel traps and aquaculture ponds at Lake Condah and elsewhere - on just one hectare of Allambie Farm, archaeologists have discovered the remains of 160 house sites.

The open grasslands encountered by Europeans were themselves the product of Aboriginal land management. Regular use of fire had helped produce extensive grassed areas, open woodland, pathways and habitats supporting abundant wildlife. The appearance of this country was subsequently important in attracting pastoral settlers, who interpreted the landscape as particularly suitable for grazing.

Pioneer Edward Henty wrote in his diary on 3 December 1834:

Pulled [rowed] over in the whale boat to Dutton's River. Light wind from the N.E. Very warm. Arrived at 6 p.m., made the boat fast in the middle of the river, and started three days' walk in the bush accompanied by H Camfield, Wm Dutton, five men, one black woman and 14 dogs, each man with a gun and sufficient quantity of damper to last for the voyage.

In the 5 December entry Henty wrote:

On descending the hill we saw a native. He immediately ran on seeing us. He was busily employed pulling the gums from the wattle trees.

=== Early pastoral settlement ===
Both the Henty brothers and Captain Griffiths (who settled at Port Fairy in 1836), combined whaling and farming. The district was explored by Thomas Mitchell in 1836 who identified the area's potential for grazing. Charles Tyers was the first to survey the area in 1839. Sheep were first brought to the district in 1836 by Thomas Manifold at Port Henry, near Geelong, and rapidly occupied the whole district. By 1840 squatters occupied almost all the district.

Mitchell's description of the region as Australia Felix helped publicise the pastoral possibilities of the country beyond Portland. The Hentys, already established at Portland Bay, subsequently expanded northwards towards the Wannon River, while other pastoralists entered the district in increasing numbers. The occupation of the Western District therefore developed with exceptional speed during the late 1830s and early 1840s.

The first settlers avoided the Western District (preferring the forest country further west), as its countryside was then exceptionally dry: tussocks were so scanty it was said one could walk to Geelong without stepping on grass. Runoff after rainfall was rapid, and it was claimed that only after cattle had firmed the soil that the grass began to thicken. The regional climate also became much wetter.

The earliest pastoral establishments were generally rudimentary. Because squatters initially lacked secure long-term tenure, their first houses were commonly constructed from whatever material was readily available, including turf, wattle and daub, pisé, timber slabs and canvas. Daniel Curdie's first dwelling at Tandarook was a slab hut; Charles Macknight lived in a slab building with pisé outbuildings at Dunmore near Port Fairy, and the Clyde Company's headquarters near Batesford, established by George Russell in 1839, was built of weatherboards.

=== Aboriginal dispossession and frontier conflict ===
With pastoral land in the colony of Van Diemen's Land fully allocated to colonists, John Batman turned his attention to mainland land speculation at the vast grasslands of Port Phillip Bay, which began in 1835 without the consent of the British Crown. With no legal recognition or protection of the Aboriginal inhabitants, some cases of violence occurred. For example, in August 1836, some Aboriginal people killed the squatter Charles Franks and an unnamed shepherd, at Franks' station on the Werribee River (near Melbourne). In response, Henry Batman (John Batman's brother) led an indiscriminate punitive expedition against a group of 70-80 Aboriginal people (men, women & children) living in 9 large huts on the Werribee River, killing an unrecorded number. In spite of this, in May 1837, Henry Batman "...was appointed acting Commissioner of Crown Lands, the official charged with overseeing the squatters." Earlier, on 4 March 1837, Governor Bourke in his visit to Melbourne addressed 120 Aboriginal people, "...whom he exhorted...to good conduct and attention to the Missionary.' The Kulin were given blankets and four favoured men, who had been recommended for 'honorary distinctions' by [Police Magistrate Captain William] Lonsdale, were awarded brass plates."

Scots were particularly prominent among the newcomers, comprising more than half and possibly as many as two-thirds of the district's squatters. Their initial relationships with Aboriginal people were not uniform, for example, with Daniel Curdie at Tandarook attempting to avoid violent confrontation, and settlers such as the Whyte brothers, who became involved in frontier violence.

By 1839, large numbers of homeless Aboriginal people from surrounding pastoral districts, were "....surviving whenever and however they could on the geographic, social and economic margins of the town [ie, Melbourne]." When Chief Protector of Aborigines George Augustus Robinson arrived in the town in the winter of 1839, "four to five hundred blacks of the Port Phillip tribes" were gathering at a camp site on the south bank of the Yarra River, suffering hunger and disease. By 1840, Robinson still "....had no stores allocated to him..." by Captain Lonsdale, the Police Magistrate in Melbourne, even though "...it was patently obvious that the Aborigines were starving, and many were ill and near death..." With land in the hinterland overrun by "...vast numbers of sheep and cattle.." and "...conditions in the countryside becoming intolerable, the blacks swarmed into Melbourne looking for food and blankets."

Between 1836 and 1842, Victorian Aboriginal groups were largely dispossessed of hunting grounds larger than the whole of England.

==== Eumeralla Wars ====
In the Portland area in the 1840s, the Gunditjmara fought for their hunting grounds in a series of clashes known as the Eumeralla Wars, in which both they and colonists experienced violent deaths. The Gunditjmara resistance became overwhelmed by the colonisers who brought in the Native Police - an organisation consisting of highly skilled Aboriginal men dedicated to keeping the peace in their native land. The historian Jan Critchett has documented this conflict in her 1990 book, A distant field of murder: Western district frontiers, 1834-1848.

==== Aftermath ====
The colonisation of the Western District had huge impacts beyond the immediate district. By January 1844, there were said to be 675 Aborigines resident in squalid camps in Melbourne. Although the British Colonial Office appointed 5 "Aboriginal Protectors" for the entire Aboriginal population of Victoria, arriving in Melbourne in 1839, they worked "...within a land policy that nullified their work, and there was no political will to change this." "It was government policy to encourage squatters to take possession of whatever Aboriginal land they chose,....that largely explains why almost all the original inhabitants of Port Phillip's vast grasslands were dead so soon after 1835". By 1845, fewer than 240 wealthy Europeans held all the pastoral licences then issued in Victoria and became the patriarchs "...that were to wield so much political and economic power in Victoria for generations to come."

With the Aboriginal population dispossessed of hunting grounds and their centuries-old management of fire having been disrupted for almost 15 years, the Colony experienced for the first time its largest ever bushfires, burning about 25% of the land area of Victoria on Black Thursday (1851) on 6 February 1851.

=== Scottish pastoral settlement ===
Scottish immigrants became an especially important component of the pastoral society that emerged in the Western District. Many arrived independently, often using family capital or money supplied through business partnerships, and frequently migrated as family groups. Their backgrounds ranged from farmers and members of tenant-farming families to merchants, doctors and men with experience in the East India Company. A substantial number had first migrated to Van Diemen's Land during the 1820s and 1830s before moving to Port Phillip as reports circulated about the grazing country available on the mainland.

Pastoral settlement was frequently organised around extended families. William Robertson, from a sheep-farming family at Alvie in Scotland, crossed to Port Phillip in 1837 and acquired the Corangamorah run near Lake Colac. He later settled there permanently, enlarged the estate and developed a successful cattle stud. His property was eventually divided among four sons, whose holdings included The Hill, Cororooke, Glen Alvie and Coragulac, illustrating the emergence of pastoral dynasties whose estates were divided among succeeding generations.

Sheep breeding and wool production were central to the wealth of several such families. Thomas Learmonth established Ercildoune in the late 1830s, and the Learmonth family became known for breeding the Pure Australian Merino. John Lang Currie at Larra likewise developed a strong reputation for the quality of his wool. John Cumming took a different route into pastoralism, accumulating wealth through brewing before purchasing Terrinallum, Mount Fyans and Stony Point on Mount Emu Creek in 1849, properties that were intended for his sons.

Thomas and Andrew Chirnside developed another extensive pastoral enterprise. Thomas arrived from Berwickshire in 1838 and Andrew followed in 1841. After taking up Mount William station near the Grampians, they progressively accumulated other properties and paid particular attention to securing access to rivers and creeks in drought-prone country. Their interests ultimately extended beyond western Victoria into New South Wales and Queensland. The brothers retained strong connections with Scotland, periodically returning there and bringing relatives, skilled workers and livestock back to Victoria.

Family, friendship and business connections helped bind the pastoral community together. John Lang Currie arrived in Port Phillip in 1841 to join relatives already in the colony and acquired Larra with his childhood friend Thomas Anderson. Earlier owner John Brown, Currie and Anderson were all connected with Selkirk in Scotland, while Anderson later purchased Wooriwyrite with another Selkirk native, Ebenezer Oliphant. Similar connections operated across numerous stations, creating networks of Scottish families and business partners throughout the district.

Although the early pastoral world was overwhelmingly male, some women operated pastoral enterprises independently. Anne Drysdale, who had farmed in Scotland before emigrating in 1839, obtained the lease of the 10,000-acre Boronggoop run between the Barwon River and Point Henry in 1840. She subsequently entered into partnership with Caroline Newcomb. Their enterprise prospered sufficiently for the pair to commission the substantial homestead Coriyule in 1848–49.

=== Pastoral stations and homesteads ===
As pastoral tenure became more secure and the wealth of successful squatters increased, the temporary buildings of the pioneering period were progressively replaced or incorporated into larger stations. From the 1840s to the 1880s Scottish pastoralists commissioned hundreds of homesteads, station buildings and related structures across western Victoria, leaving a distinctive architectural legacy in the region.

The principal homestead formed only one component of a large pastoral station. Established properties commonly contained workers' huts, stores, dairies, barns, blacksmiths' shops, stables, milking and horse yards and shearing sheds. Some of the largest complexes came to resemble small settlements and included a post office, schoolroom or chapel. Their surrounding landscapes were also altered by avenues, shelter belts and boundary plantings. From the 1850s, extensive dry-stone walls were constructed around the central lakes district, in some cases by skilled wallers brought from Britain.

Many Western District homesteads developed in stages rather than being constructed at once. An early cottage or hut was often retained while new stone wings, service buildings and courtyards were added as the owner's family, workforce and wealth increased. Carranballac, for example, developed from a timber cottage through later freestone wings to a substantial basalt homestead in the 1860s. Larra similarly grew through successive additions before the architects Davidson and Henderson were engaged in 1875 to consolidate and enlarge the house. At Merrang, a timber cottage was followed by a stone wing, an Italianate extension and a later verandah.

Local stone became an important characteristic of this building tradition. Numerous homesteads were constructed from the dark basalt or "bluestone" of the volcanic plains, although timber, brick, sandstone, freestone and granite were also used. The use of locally quarried stone connected the built environment of the pastoral period closely with the volcanic landscape of the district.

By the late 1840s and 1850s more ambitious architectural styles also began to appear. Coriyule and Ercildoune incorporated Gothic Revival influences, while the broad hipped-roof bungalow with verandahs became a particularly common Western District form. Early examples included homesteads at Blackwood, Mawallok and Werribee Park. Some buildings, including the early Wooriwyrite homestead, also demonstrated Anglo-Indian influences through wide roofs and deep verandahs.

=== Pastoral wealth and architecture ===
Increasing pastoral prosperity supported the growth of architectural practices in regional centres. During the middle decades of the nineteenth century, substantial houses were designed by architects working from Hamilton, Geelong, Colac, Camperdown, Ballarat and Warrnambool. Among the notable projects were Coriyule, the successive buildings at Mawallok and Golf Hill, and Chatsworth House, designed for pastoralist John Moffatt in 1859 and enlarged during the following decade.

From the 1870s improved communications with Melbourne enabled prosperous pastoral families increasingly to employ prominent metropolitan architects. The scale and architectural ambition of their residences correspondingly increased. Following the division of the Black, Finlay and Gladstone partnership in 1868, for example, Niel Black received the Mount Noorat portion of their holdings and commissioned Charles Webb to design a substantial two-storey residence there.

The Chirnside family's Werribee Park Mansion represented one of the grandest expressions of this pastoral wealth. Thomas and Andrew Chirnside had initially concentrated their investment on land and stock, but after spending several years in Scotland the family began construction of the mansion in 1873. Designed by P. Colquhoun and James Fox, it adopted the form of a large Italianate country house and contained elaborate interior decoration and contemporary domestic services.

Other Scottish-born architects and builders also contributed substantially to the landscape. Alexander Hamilton arrived from Moffat as a millwright and miller and later operated from Mortlake as a builder, surveyor and engineer before establishing an architectural practice at Colac. His works included the Gnarpurt woolshed of 1880 and Wooriwyrite homestead of 1883.

The partnership of Alexander Davidson and George Henderson was particularly prolific. Both had worked in Edinburgh before establishing themselves in Victoria, and between 1867 and Henderson's return to Scotland in 1877 their practice completed at least 150 major projects, including numerous homesteads. Their Western District works included Barwon Park at Winchelsea, Narrapumelap near Wickliffe and Glen Alvie near Colac. Their designs ranged from relatively restrained symmetrical houses to picturesque compositions featuring bays, gables and towers.

An unusual example of a self-contained station was Warrock near Casterton. Scottish-born cabinetmaker George Robertson acquired the property in 1844 and gradually constructed more than 50 timber buildings before his death in 1890. The structures, which included workers' accommodation and buildings serving numerous agricultural functions, were arranged around a central green and allowed the property to operate as a largely self-sufficient settlement.

By the late nineteenth century, the Western District homestead ranged from the relatively modest hipped-roof bungalow to substantial country houses such as Werribee Park, Chatsworth House and The Gums, and more picturesque complexes such as Narrapumelap, Glen Alvie and Ercildoune. Their construction reflected both the growth of the pastoral economy and the emergence of successful pastoral families as an influential social and economic elite within colonial Victoria.

Notable pastoralists of the Western District
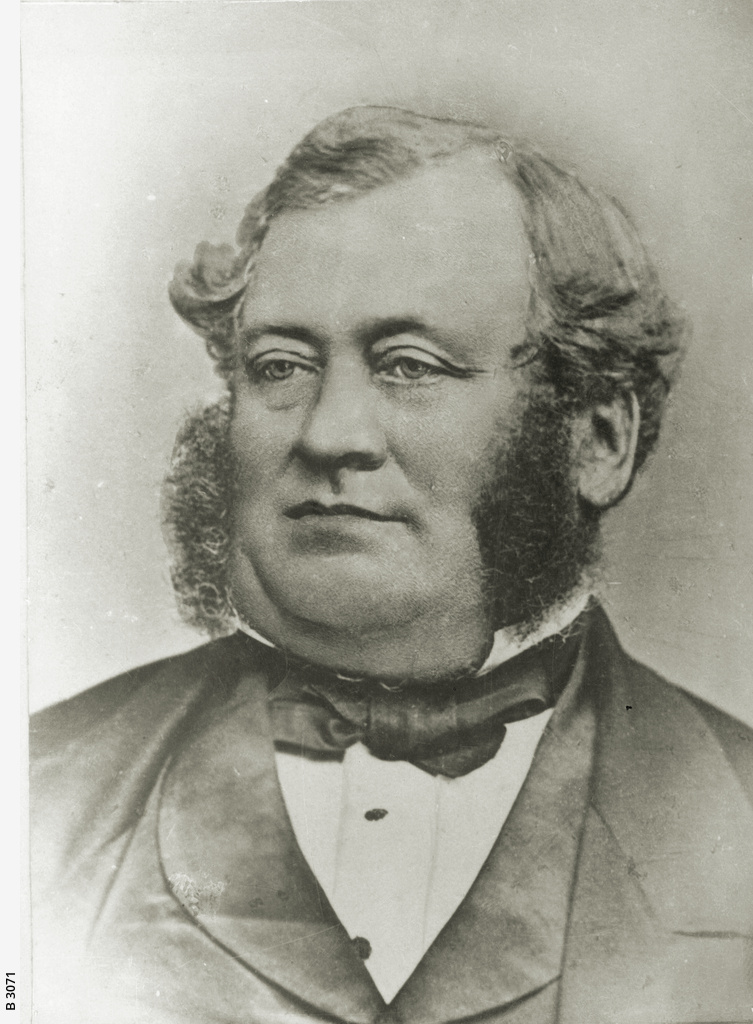
Edward Henty

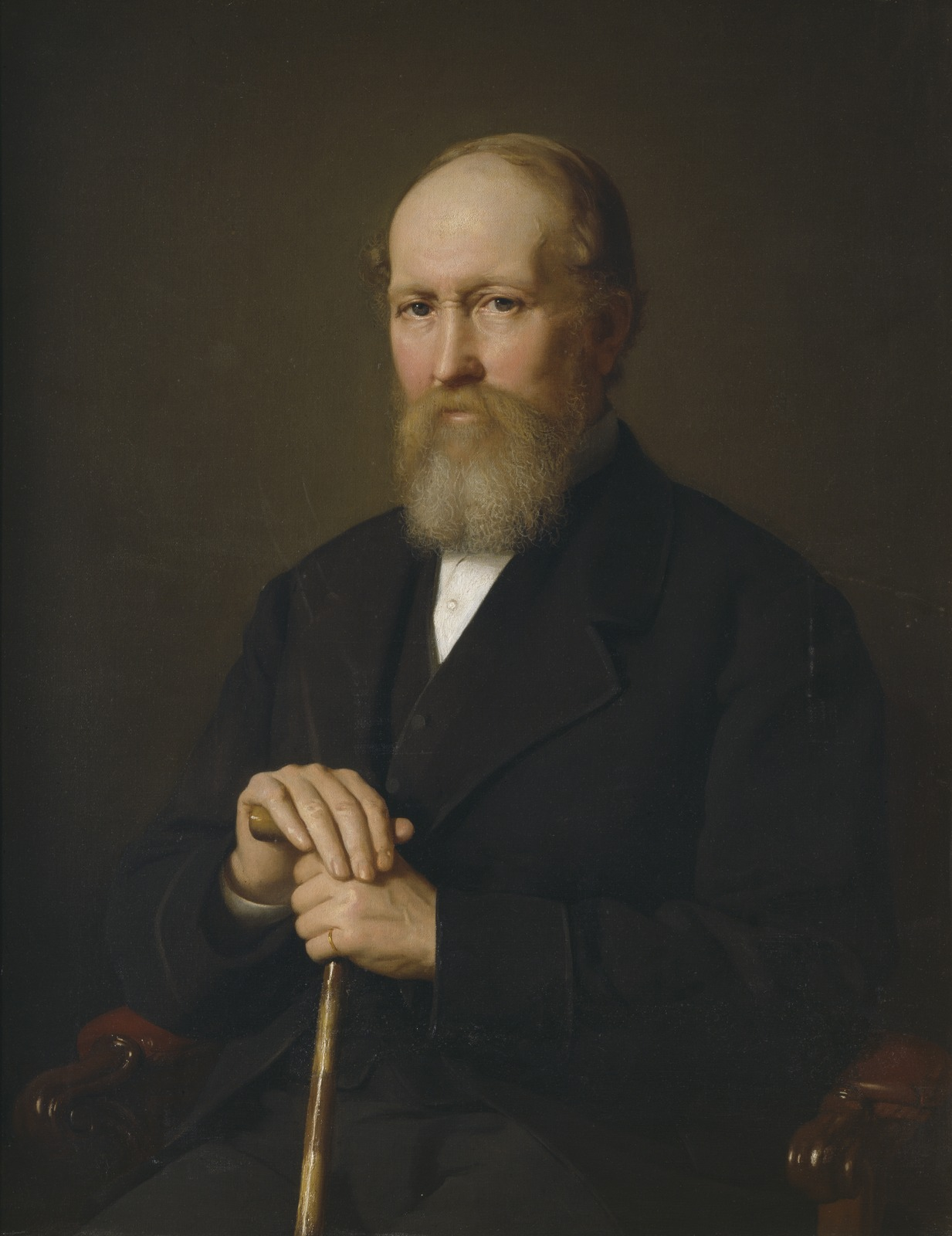
George Russell

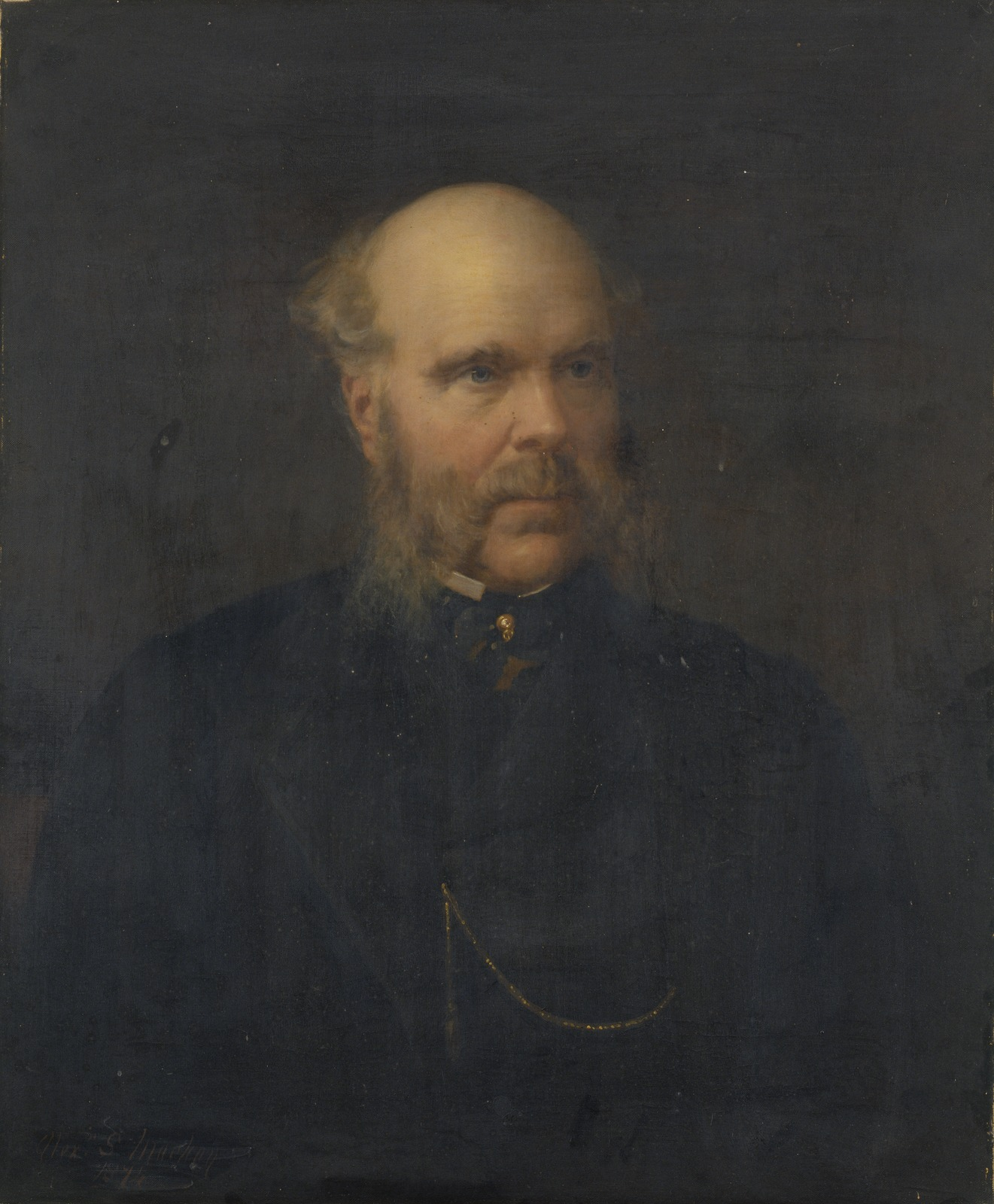
Thomas Chirnside

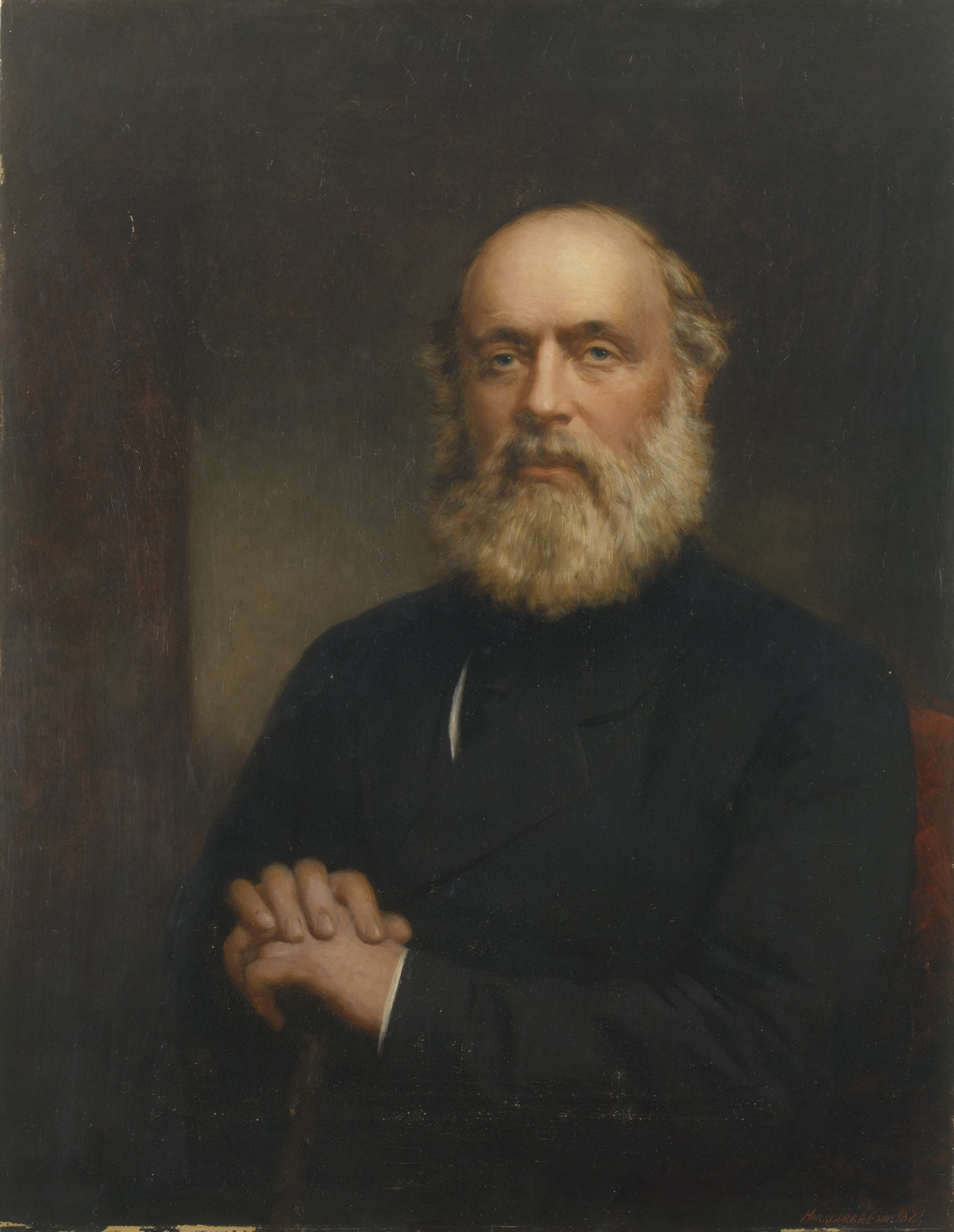
Andrew Chirnside

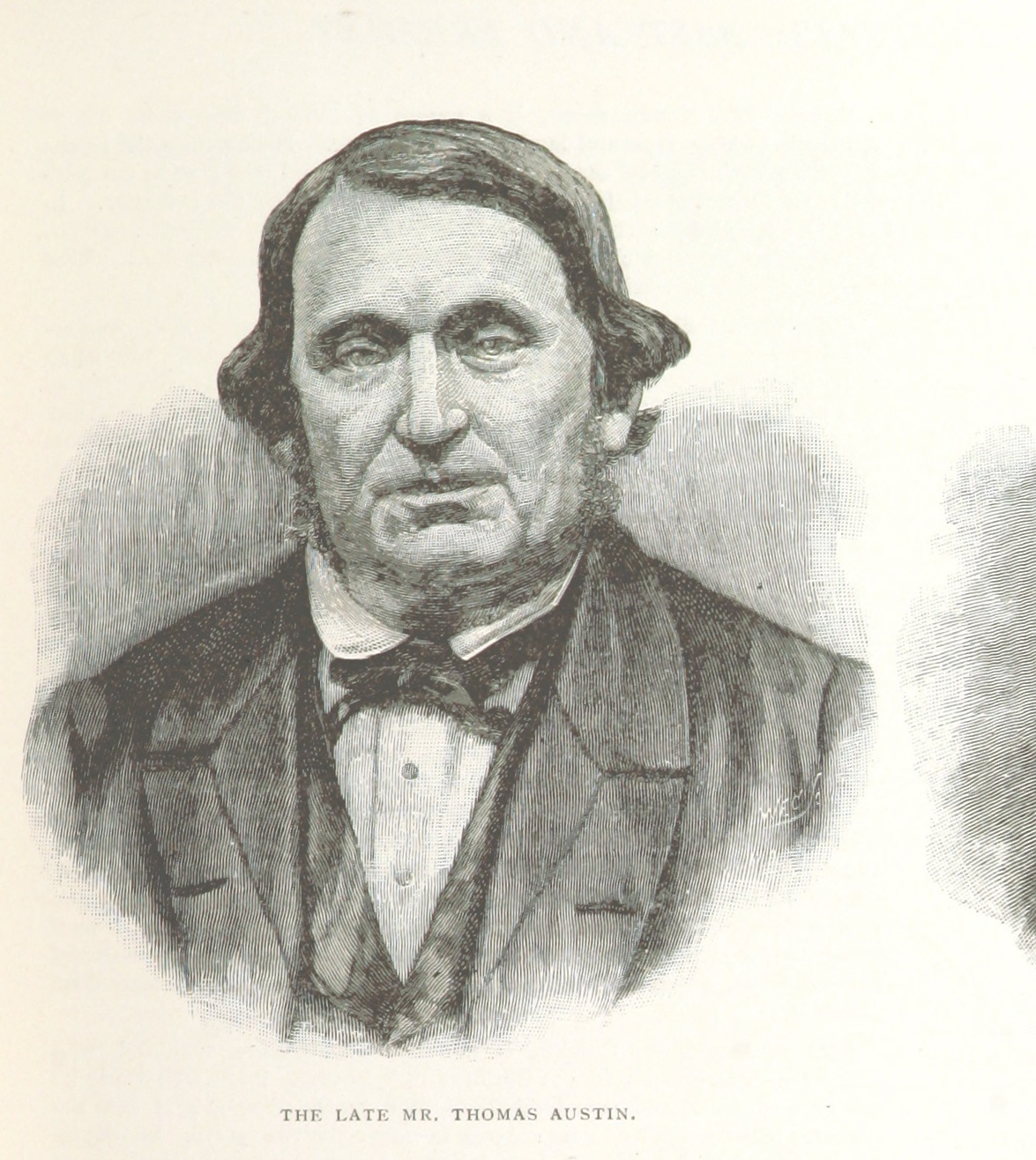
Thomas Austin

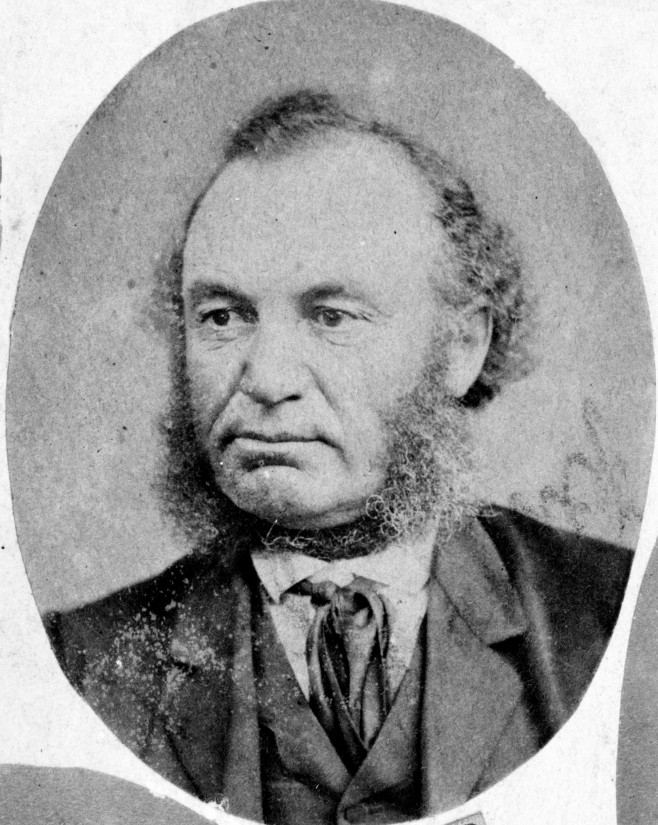
John Lang Currie

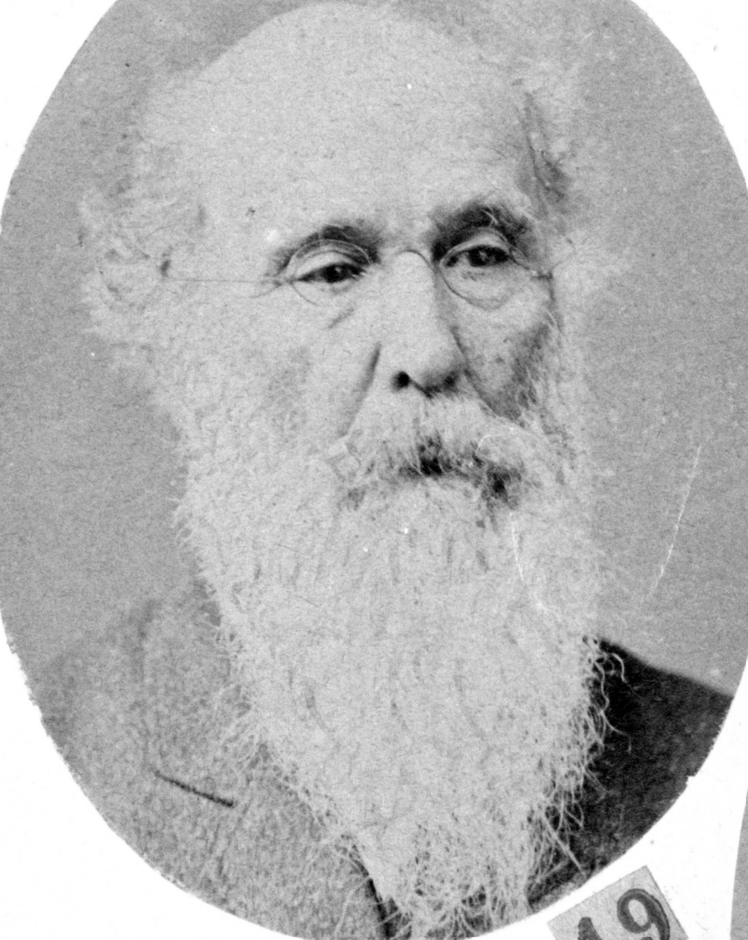
William Robertson

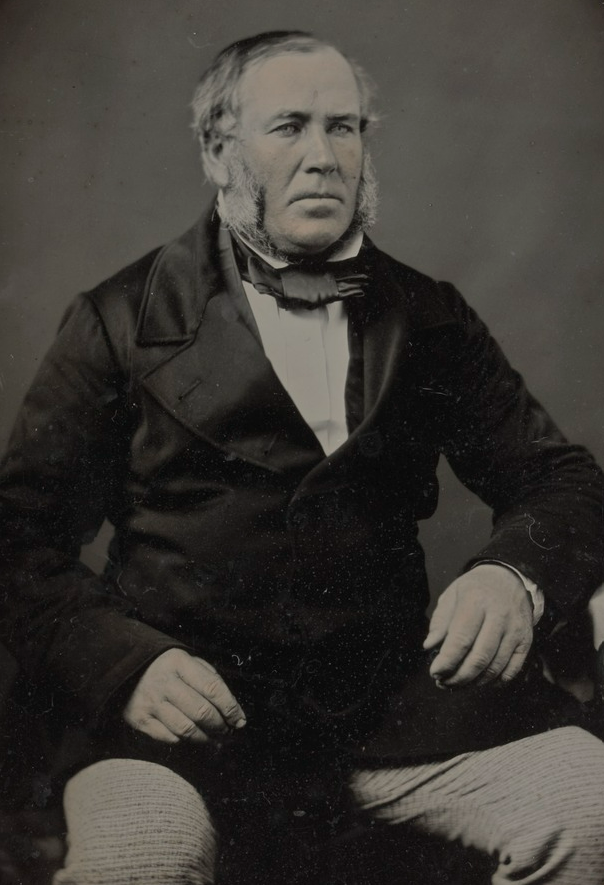
Daniel Curdie

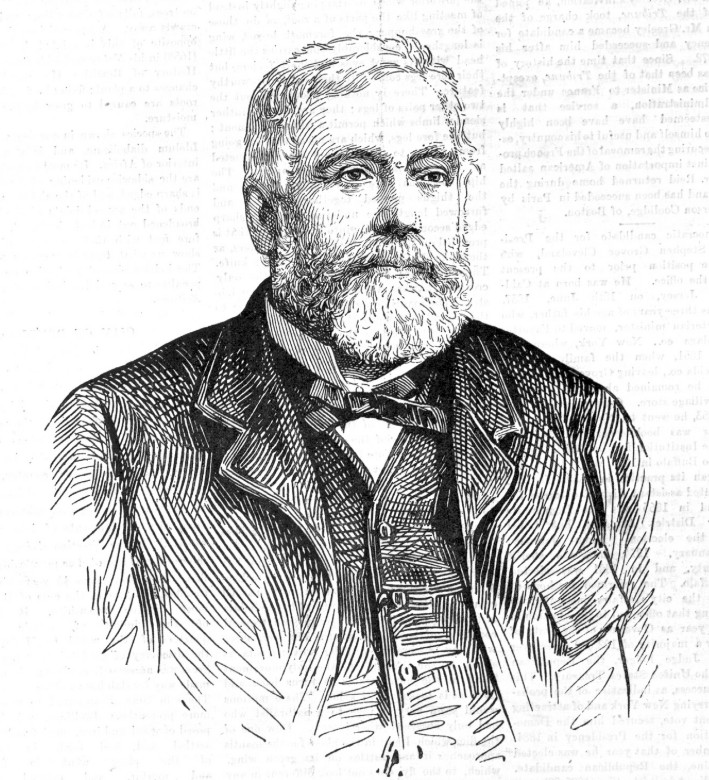
Philip Russell

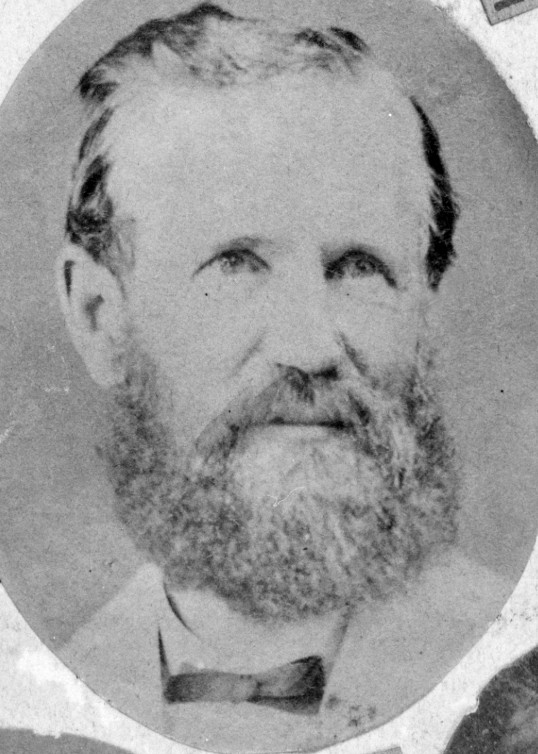
Thomas Russell

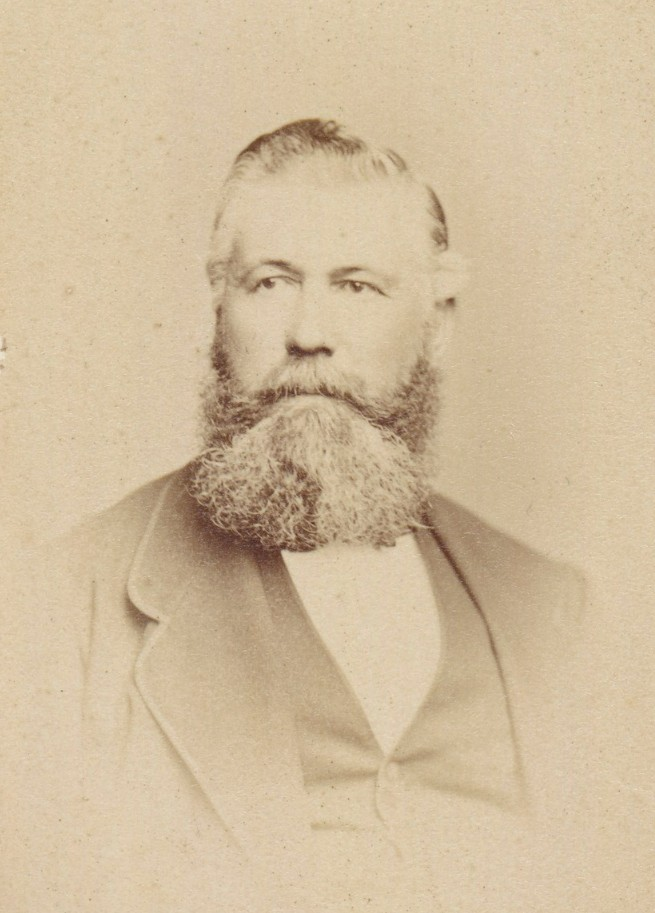
John Cumming

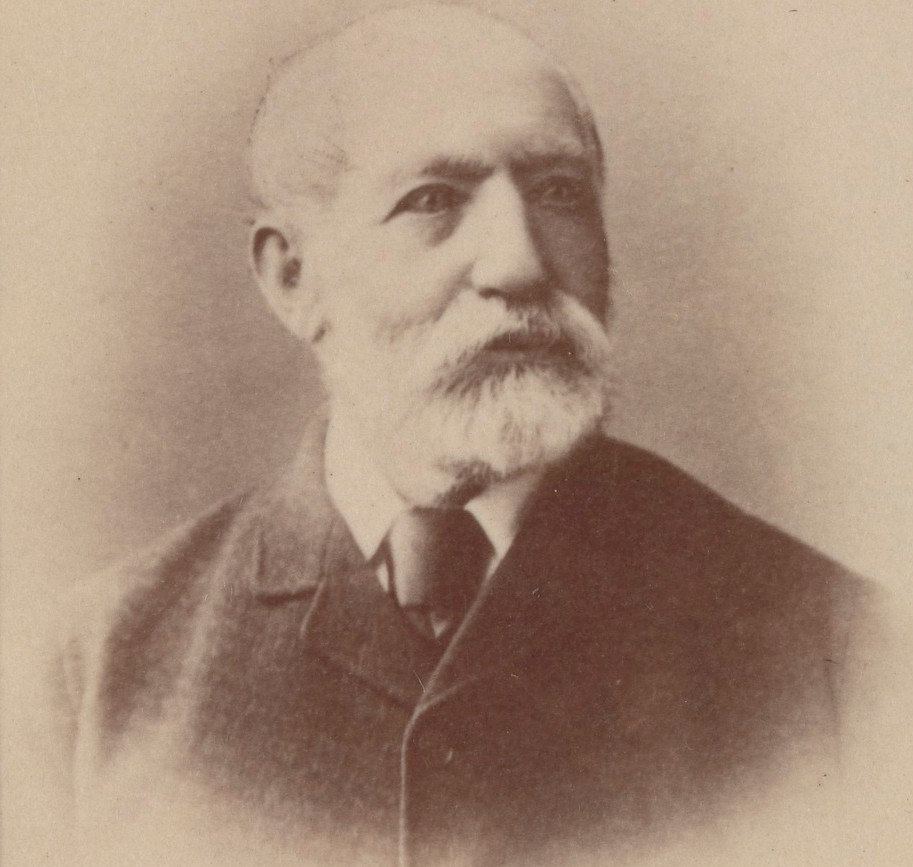
Peter McArthur

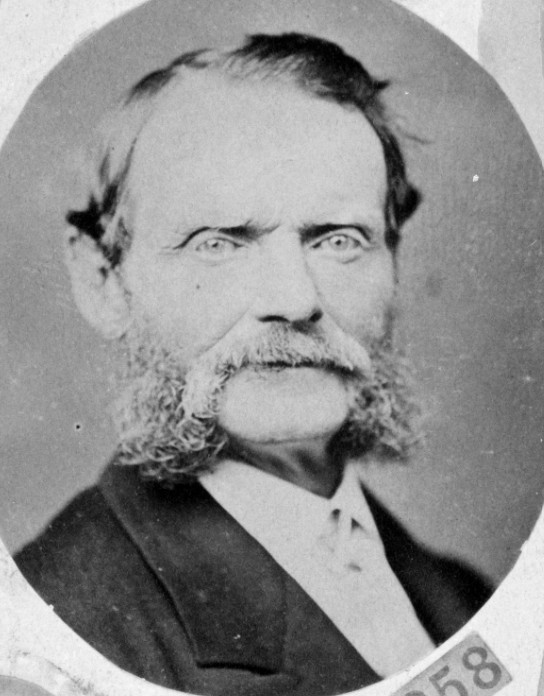
Goerge Fairbairn

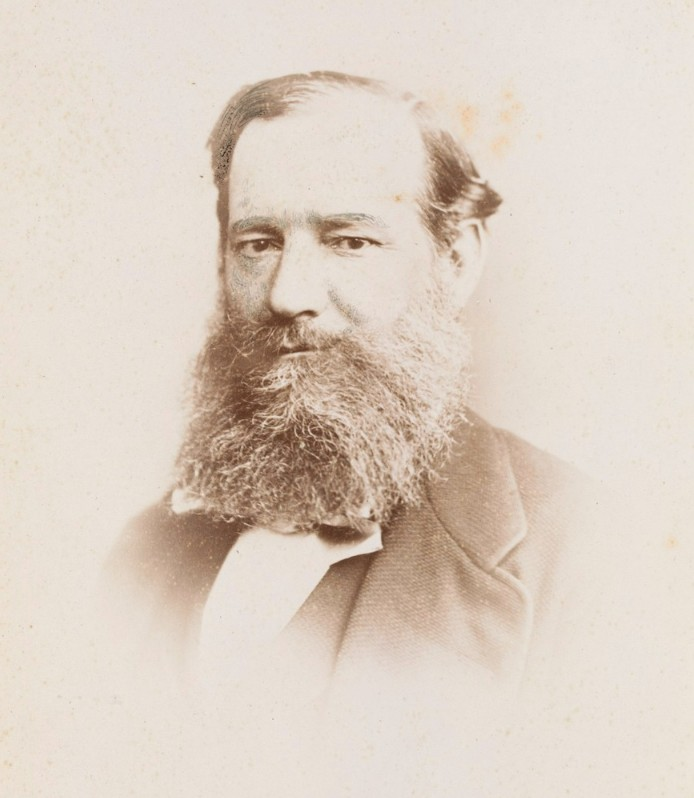
Charles Armytage

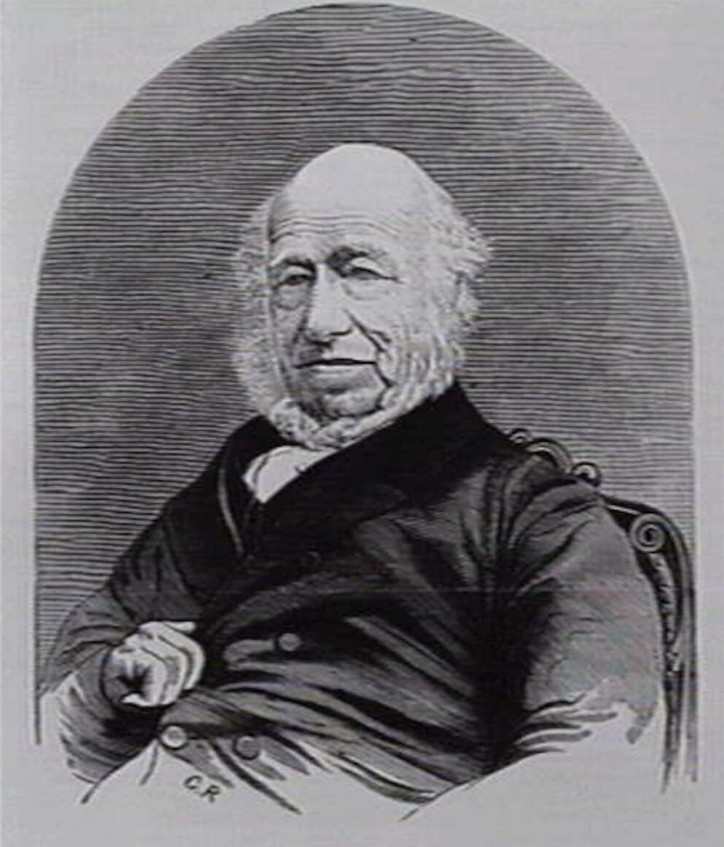
Henry Hopkins

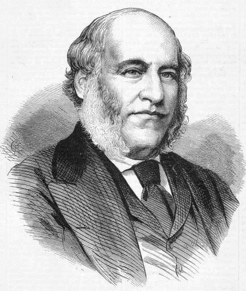
Niel Black

=== Missions ===
Missionaries sought to relocate Gunditjmara people of the west to a mission established further east near Purnim in 1861, however, the Gunditjmara from the Portland region refused because of tension with rival Aboriginal clans from the eastern boundary of Gunditjmara country and beyond the Hopkins River. Five years later in 1866, 827 ha (2,043 acres) of Crown land at Lake Condah was set aside for use as an Aboriginal mission. This land was gazetted as a reserve in 1869 and an Anglican mission was established. In 1951, the Lake Condah reserve, with the exception of three small areas, was revoked and the land was handed over to the Soldier Settlement Commission.

=== Towards recognition of Aboriginal rights ===
In 1980, the Gunditjmara launched Onus v. Alcoa, taking legal action in the Supreme Court of Victoria to prevent Alcoa of Australia Ltd from damaging or interfering with Gunditjmara cultural sites located on the same place as the proposed aluminium smelter at Portland. The Supreme Court dismissed their subsequent application for leave to appeal to the Federal Court. However, the Gunditjmara took the matter to the High Court of Australia where they were successful. High Court Chief Justice Gibbs judged that: "The appellants have an interest in the subject matter of the present action which is greater than that of other members of the public and indeed greater than that of other persons of Aboriginal descent who are not members of the Gournditch-jmara people. The applicants and other members of the Gournditch-jmara [ie, the Gunditjmara] people would be more particularly affected than other members of the Australian community by the destruction of the relics".

On 30 March 2007, the Gunditjmara were recognised by the Federal Court of Australia to be the native title-holders of almost 140,000 hectares (350,000 acres) of Crown land and waters in the Portland area. On 27 July 2011, together with the Eastern Maar people, the Gunditjmara people were recognised to be the native title-holders of almost 4,000 hectares (9,900 acres) of Crown land in the Yambuk region, including Lady Julia Percy Island, known to them as Deen Maar.

== Primary production ==
Wheat was grown in the drier northern part of the district for some time until more easily managed soils in the Wimmera were developed. Dairying was developed as a major industry in the wetter southern parts during this period, as was the cultivation of potatoes and onions on the best soils.

In the Otway Ranges, forestry became the major industry, especially after the building of the Great Ocean Road which opened up these very wet areas. Because of the change in focus since the late 1960s to woodchipping, many timber mills are now defunct as jobs have moved to Geelong. Tourism is the dominant industry in towns such as Lorne and Apollo Bay, which fill up during the summer as Melburnians are drawn by the stunning scenery and milder weather. In towns like Heywood and Nelson, pine plantations have been the dominant industry since the 1950s but the industry, even as plantations mature, is under threat due to poor prices.

== See also ==
- Kanawinka Geopark
