= Shaw River (Victoria) =

Shaw
- Location of the Shaw River mouth in Victoria
- Etymology: In honour of James Shaw Kennedy.

Location
- Country: Australia
- State: Victoria
- Region: Victorian Midlands, Naracoorte Coastal Plain (IBRA), Western District
- Local government area: Glenelg Shire

Physical characteristics
- Source
  - location: near Macarthur
  - coordinates: 38°0′54″S 142°8′15″E
  - elevation: 174 m (571 ft)
- Mouth: confluence with the Eumeralla River in Lake Yambuk
  - location: southwest of Yambuk
  - coordinates: 38°19′12″S 142°3′6″E
  - elevation: −1 m (−3.3 ft)
- Length: 51 km (32 mi)

Basin features
- River system: Glenelg Hopkins catchment
- Tributaries
  - left: Ware Creek
  - right: Carmichael Creek, Kangaroo Creek (Victoria)
- Lake: Lake Yambuk

The Shaw River, a perennial river of the Glenelg Hopkins catchment, is located in the Western District of Victoria, Australia.

== Course and features ==
The Shaw River rises near Macarthur and flows generally south, across a coastal plain, joined by three minor tributaries before reaching its confluence with the Eumeralla River in Lake Yambuk. The Eumeralla empties into Portland Bay in the Great Australian Bight south of Yambuk. The river descends 174 metres (571 ft) over its 51-kilometre (32 mi) course.

The river is traversed by the Great Ocean Road near its confluence with the Eumeralla River in Lake Yambuk, at the Yambuk Important Bird Area.

== Etymology ==
It was named by Major Mitchell in 1836 after General Sir James Shaw Kennedy, a Peninsular War veteran.

== See also ==
- List of rivers of Australia § Victoria
