= Lady Julia Percy Island =

Island in Victoria, Australia

Native name: Deen Maar
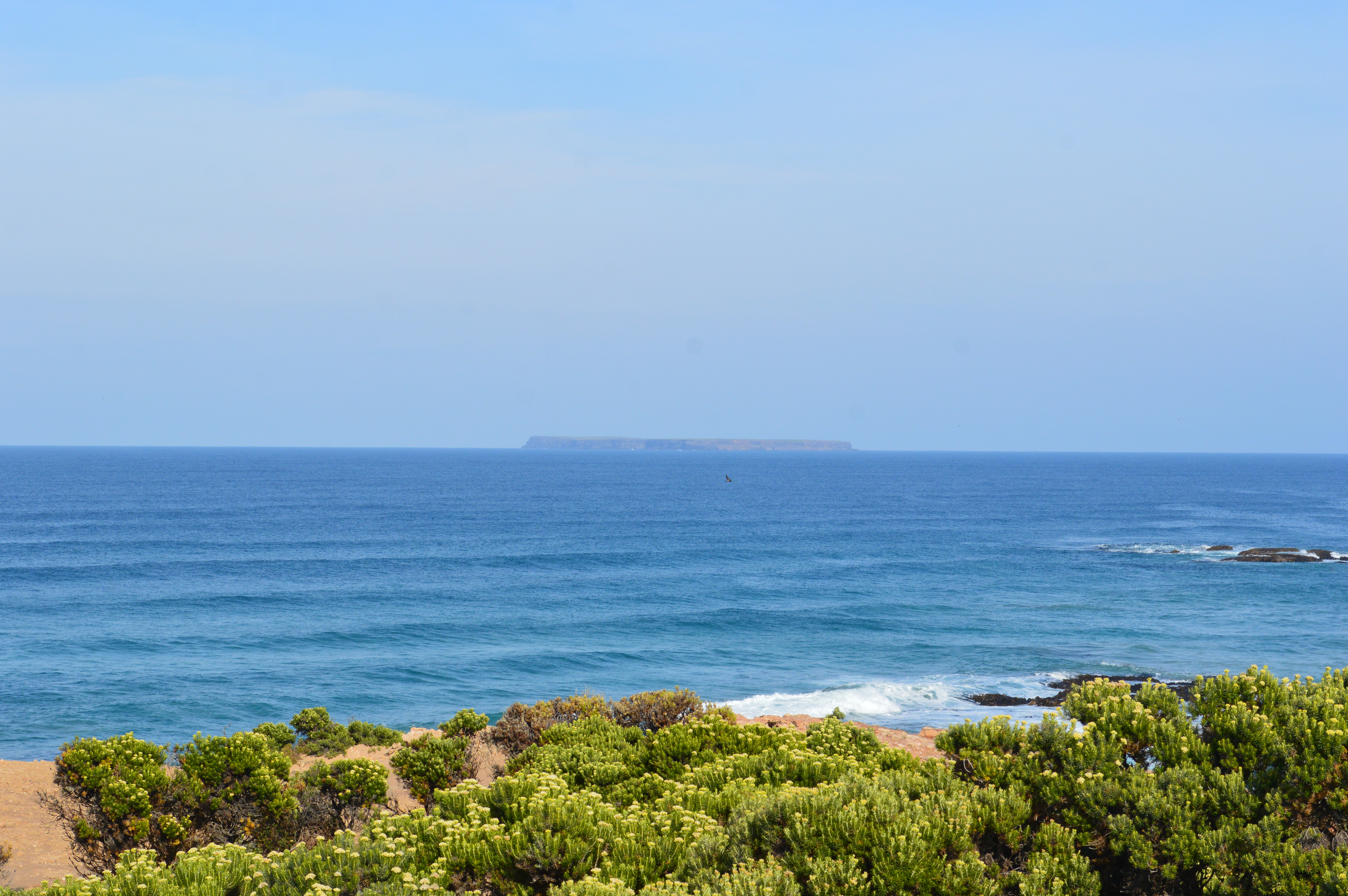
- Lady Julia Percy Island seen from the Yambuk Flora and Fauna Reserve

- Location within Shire of Moyne

Geography
- Location: Bass Strait
- Coordinates: 38°25′30″S 142°00′00″E
- Area: 130 ha (320 acres)
- Length: 2.4 km (1.49 mi)
- Width: 1.2 km (0.75 mi)

Administration
- Australia
- State: Victoria

Lady Julia Percy Island, known as Deen Maar or Dhinmar in the Gunditjmara language, lies 8.1 kilometres (5.0 mi) off the coast, in the Barwon South West region of Victoria, Australia in Bass Strait. The island is an unincorporated area under the direct administration of the Government of Victoria.

== Description ==
Lady Julia Percy Island is 12 kilometres (7.5 mi) south-south-west of Yambuk, and 21 kilometres (13 mi) south-west of Port Fairy. The island is about 2 kilometres (1.2 mi) in length by 1 kilometre (0.62 mi) in width, with an area of 1.33 square kilometres (0.51 sq mi), comprising a plateau, varying in height from 32–46 metres (105–151 ft) asl, surrounded by cliffs, rock platforms and reefs. It contains an important seal breeding colony. It has a long history of human exploitation, which has drastically affected its vegetation communities, though it is now protected as a State Faunal Reserve. It is listed on Australia's Register of the National Estate. It is best viewed from The Crags or Yambuk Lake, both of which are in the Yambuk area.

== History ==
=== Gunditjmara significance ===
Deen Maar was well known to the Gunditjmara people; they believed that the spirits of the dead were conveyed across the sea to the island from a cave called Tarnwirring ("the flowing of the wind") at the top of a rocky sea cliff, It is also the place where ancestral creator being Bunjil was said to have left this world, and other spirits continue to fly over to Deen Maar before ascending to the stars.

The island was also known as Tirngoona, meaning "where the sun go away longa night".

=== 19th century: renaming and sealing ===
The island was given the name "Lady Julia's Island" in 1800 by Lieutenant James Grant after either the wife or daughter of Hugh Percy, 2nd Duke of Northumberland. In 1802 Matthew Flinders expanded the name to Lady Julia Percy's Island as he sailed past on his ship the Investigator. Also in 1802, Nicolas Baudin sailed past in his ship the Géographe, and recorded the island as Ile aux Alouettes, a name that has not persisted.

During the early 19th century, sealing took place with sealing gangs living on the island often for months at a time. There are two graves on the island – one of a sealer buried in 1822, and one of a man named Hardman buried in 1828 by Captain Wishart of the Fairy. Guano was mined on the island for fertiliser until 1861, being transported to Port Fairy in barges.

=== 20th century ===
In January 1936 a scientific expedition from Melbourne University's McCoy Society visited the island for six weeks and carried out a comprehensive ecological survey.

In the waters on the western side of Lady Julia Percy Island lie pieces of an RAAF Avro Anson aircraft. On 15 February 1944, Avro Anson AW-878 of 2 Air Observer's School (2 A.O.S.) took off from Mount Gambier airfield in South Australia at 0800 hours to carry out a radius of action navigation exercise. They were to fly from Mount Gambier to Douglas Point, radius of action to Lady Julia Percy Island, radius of action to Douglas Point and then back to Mount Gambier. At 1230 hours, when the aircraft had not returned to base, overdue signals were sent out. At 1300 hours a search was carried out over the route of the exercise and at 1430 hours part of the aircraft was sighted on Lady Julia Percy Island. A fishing boat searched in the vicinity of the island that evening and passed through small pieces of wreckage strewn over about three miles. A further search by boat was carried out the next morning in the same area which resulted in the recovery from the sea and the island of the port and starboard wingtips, the port aileron, the door to the gunner's cockpit, portion of a main spar, the top cover of a fuel tank bay and a Mae West. The top cover of the fuel tank bay had the number AW-878 in pencil on the underneath side and the Mae West was identified as having been drawn and signed for by Flight Sergeant MacLellan on 15 February 1944. The bodies of the four crew members were never located. Those presumed to have lost their lives in this accident were: Flight Sergeant James Henry MacLellan (410684) Pilot; Flight Sergeant Dennis Leslie Baulderstone (416712); LAC Norman Thomas Kruck (433368); and LAC Brian Carter Ladyman (436921).

== Geology ==
Formed some seven million years ago, the island is much older than other volcanoes in the region, and is also unusual in being built by both submarine and terrestrial eruptions. It provides exposures of internal volcanic structure, including a volcanic vent. Six successive lava flows can be seen in the coastal cliffs. It is Australia’s only off-shore volcano and the only large basalt island off the coast of western Victoria. Lady Julia Percy Island is considered part of the Newer Volcanics Province — this polycyclic volcano erupted in two phases, at 7.80 ± 0.08 Ma and 6.22 ± 0.06 Ma

== Flora and fauna ==
=== Flora ===
With regard to the flora, Frederic Wood Jones said in 1936 of the island, following his leadership of the 1936 McCoy Society expedition:

A century ago it was covered with a dense, almost impenetrable, growth of the mixed bushy scrub that characterizes certain parts of the coast of the adjacent mainland. Some sixty years ago this dense scrub was still standing over the major portion of the island; but to-day the whole of the plateau is devoid of any growth more majestic than bracken fern and thistles. The whole plateau is, at present, a windswept area, clothed only by vegetation knee-high at the best, and at the worst, by loose volcanic soil or bare rock. This denudation of forest cover is due to human interference, for pigs were at one time turned down on the island, rabbits were liberated and are still living in their thousands, and sealers, fishermen and guano workers have cut down and burned the stunted and wind-blown trees that formerly covered the island.

The landscape of the island's plateau is now bleak and windswept. It lacks trees and is still largely covered with grasses and bracken on thin black soil. In some areas, the soil has collapsed into the underlying rabbit warrens.

The dominant vegetation communities are grassland and closed fernland. The vulnerable Shore Spleenwort (Asplenium obtusatum) still survives there.

=== Fauna ===
The island is one of four Australian fur seal breeding colonies in Victoria and, with an estimated 10-12,000 individuals, is the largest such colony in Australia. It is occasionally visited by Australian sea lions and southern elephant seals.

Several seabird species use the island for breeding. These include some that inhabit the island permanently, such as the short-tailed shearwater, fairy prion, and common diving petrel, and also birds that visit from afar, such as the albatross, sooty oystercatcher, and crested tern. The island is home to breeding little penguins (2000 pairs), common diving-petrels (1000 pairs), fairy prions (1000 pairs), and short-tailed shearwaters (15,000 pairs). Ground-dwelling birds include the stubble quail, swamp harrier, peregrine falcon, nankeen kestrel, white-fronted chat, Richard's pipit, welcome swallow, and little grassbird.

White's skink is the only reptile present. The surrounding waters are visited by great white sharks.

=== Rabbit eradication ===
Rabbits have been competing with native and other species of seabird, by taking up valuable space that could be used for nesting sites for the birds. They can also make the soil unsuitable for future use as nesting sites. As of August 2023 the Victorian Department of Energy, Environment and Climate Action (DEECA) is looking at ways to improve the environment for the birds, including a project to eradicate the rabbits. After consultation, the Eastern Maar Aboriginal Corporation and Gunditj Mirring Traditional Owners Aboriginal Corporation are supporting the project. There are several phases to the project, which is aimed to completely eradicate the pest by destroying every last rabbit.

Baiting is done by hand using chopped carrots that have been had calicivirus or rabbit haemorrhagic disease virus (RHDV) in them, and by helicopter, dropping baited cereal pellets onto less accessible spots such as cliff ledges. Remaining rabbits are counted after each baiting drop.

Some time after baiting, dogs specially trained to detect rabbits, along with eradication experts, spend around 10 days on the island to find the last few rabbits. The project team will monitor Deen Maar for a further three years before declaring eradication of the pest.

The island was declared "Rabbit free" on 24 July 2026.

== Access ==
Access to Lady Julia Percy Island is restricted by law, and landing is by permit only. Access is only possible in a tiny boat, and entails climbing up a small cliff upon landing.

Boat cruises from Port Fairy to the waters around the island are available; they allow people to see the seal colony and watch whales and seabirds on the way.
