= Camperdown Football Club =

Camperdown

Names
- Full name: Camperdown Football Netball Club Inc
- Nickname(s): Magpies

Club details
- Founded: 1877; 148 years ago
- Colours: Black White
- Competition: Hampden FNL
- Premierships: 6 (1938, 1951, 1968, 1970, 1999, 2000)
- Ground(s): Leura Oval

Uniforms
Home

Other information
- Official website: http://websites.sportstg.com/club_info.cgi?c=0-6167-80596-0-0

The Camperdown Football Netball Club, nicknamed the Magpies, is an Australian rules football and netball club based in the town of Camperdown, Victoria.

The club teams currently compete in the Hampden Football Netball League, which Camperdown is founding member, having joined in 1930.

== History ==
The first Camperdown club was formed in 1877 but it disbanded within a few years with accumulated debts. A second attempt in 1883 is the club that continues today.

The late 1880s and 1890s the club usually participated in a four team competition that a wealthy patron would donate a shield as a prize. Usually it was four clubs, Camperdown, Cobden, Mortlake and Terang. This arrangement continued until 1901.

In August 1901, local soldier Trooper Lawrence was killed in action during the Boer War. There is a memorial to the west of the town's clocktower. The Moran trophy consisted of four teams, in order of finish, Camperdown (undefeated), Cobden, Mortlake and Terang. Now because of poor receipts, the delegates wanted a grand Final to cover the outstanding costs incurred that season. Camperdown who were undefeated voted against the proposal but were overruled by the other three clubs who were all in the red. A Grand Final was organised between Camperdown and Mortlake, because Cobden had already wound up for the year. News came through that Trooper Lawrence had been killed in South Africa and the town of Camperdown wanted to have a memorial service for a favourite son on the same day as the grand final. Camperdown asked for a postponement of the match but Mortlake refused. A team from Mortlake turned up on the day and claimed a forfeit. As Mortlake already had the trophy because they won it the previous year and kept it for good. Acrimony because of Mortlake's actions, Camperdown refused to play Mortlake for five years. Camperdown decided to look east and they joined a Colac-based competition.

In 1909 the Corangamite Football Association was formally founded with matches between the four towns. Camperdown was the strongest team winning the pennant in 1909, 1910, 1912, 1913, 1914. After WWI success continued with flags in 1921 and 1923.

When the Warrnambool DFA decided to merge with the Corangamite FA to form the Western District FL in 1924, this created an eight team competition. South Warrnambool merged with Warrnambool City to form the Warrnambool Football Club. A dispute over finals allocation caused Camperdown to withdraw and join a Colac-based competition. The club won the Grand Final in 1926 and lost the flag the following year. After two season Camperdown returned to the Western District FL playing in the Eastern Zone. For a while the league played zone football, a fixture for eastern clubs and one for the western clubs, with finals between the tops clubs at the end of the year.

The admission of Hamilton caused additional traveling costs and problems with extra time away from home. The Hampden Football League was formed in 1930, when the three eastern clubs broke away from the Western District FL. Terang and Camperdown did not want to continue to travel to Hamilton because their players were farmers who could not spend all day away from the farm to play football, as they had cows to milk. Mortlake agreed with Camperdown and Terang and resigned from the WDFL. Cobden was left with a predicament, and requested admittance to the new league.

In 1933, South Warrnambool and Warrnambool joined the league, as takings at the gate had been greater when playing Camperdown or Terang that against any team in the WDFL.

Camperdown won their first flag in 1938, during that season Cecil Bateman kicked a league record of 21 goals in a game against Cobden. It is a record that still stands to this day.

After WWII Camperdown was one of the stronger teams in the competition but only once, in 1951, was it successful in claiming the flag.

In 1965 Camperdown managed to lure Geelong premiership player Stewart Lord as captain coach, under his leadership the team improved to win the 1968 and 1970 Grand Finals.

Camperdown has the ability to make the Grand Final but have only won in 6 of 19 occasions

The Magpies' most recent premierships, won back to back, in 1999 and 2000 were under the coaching of local football star, Ken Hinkley .

== Football Premierships ==
Seniors

- Corangamite FA
  - 1909, 1910, 1912, 1913, 1914, 1921, 1923
- Corangamite FL
  - 1926
- Hampden Football League
  - 1938, 1951, 1968, 1970, 1999, 2000

== Football League - Best & Fairest winners ==
Seniors

- Hampden Football League - Maskell Medallists
  - 1968 - David Lane
  - 1974 - Graeme Fitzgerald
  - 1982 & 1983 - Alan Woodman
  - 1988 - Brian Hinkley
  - 1992 - Brad Nicholls
  - 1994 - Nick Hider
  - 1999 - Mark Bourke
  - 2006 - Ben Harris

== VFL/AFL players ==
The following footballers played with Campderdown FC prior to making their senior VFL / AFL debut.

- 1872 - Albert Pompey Austin - Geelong
- 1900 - John Parish - Collingwood
- 1932 - Harold Maskell - Geelong
- 1937 - Alf Clay - Hawthorn
- 1947 - Len White - Geelong
- 1952 - Norm Sharp - Geelong
- 1953 - Bruce Murray - Geelong
- 1956 - Bryan King - St. Kilda
- 1963 - Brian Carroll - Fitzroy
- 1963 - Barry Rippon - Fitzroy
- 1963 - Brian Williams - Fitzroy
- 1965 - Peter Wood - Fitzroy
- 1966 - Garrey Wynd - Melbourne
- 1974 - Wayne Linton - Fitzroy
- 1980 - Ross Thornton - Fitzroy
- 1987 - Ken Hinkley - Fitzroy, Geelong
- 1988 - Paul Broderick - Fitzroy, Richmond
- 1995 - Nick Hider - Collingwood
- 1996 - Scott Lucas - Essendon
- 2008 - Easton Wood - Western Bulldogs
- 2020 - David Lake - Gold Coast Suns

The following footballers came to Camperdown FNC with prior senior VFL / AFL experience.

- 1920 - Jim Caldwell - South Melbourne
- 1933 - Lloyd Hagger - Geelong
- 1937 - Danny Warr - St. Kilda
- 1947 - Jack Hacker - South Melbourne
- 1954 - Don Grossman - South Melbourne
- 1954 - Ritchie Green - Carlton
- 1965 - Stewart Lord - Geelong
- 1982 - Alan Woodman - Geelong

== Bibliography ==
- Evergreen Hampden by Fred R. Bond, 1979, ISBN 9780868251080
- History of football in the Western District by John Stoward, ISBN 9780957751590
