= Hampden Football Netball League =

Australian rules football and netball league

- Sport: Australian rules football Netball
- Founded: 1930; 96 years ago
- No. of teams: 10
- Country: Australia
- Confederation: AFL Victoria
- Most titles: Warrnambool (25)
- Level on pyramid: 1

The Hampden Football Netball League is an Australian rules football and netball league based in South-Western Victoria, with clubs located in towns along or near the Princes Highway from Camperdown to Portland.

The league is a major country league. It comprises an amalgamation of the Hampden Football League with the women's netball league with the same teams and playing draw.

== History ==
The Hampden Football League was formed in 1930, when the four founding clubs broke away from the Western District FL. Terang and Camperdown did not want to continue to travel to Hamilton because their players were farmers who could not spend all day away from the farm to play football, as they had cows to milk.

Colac and Coragulac merged to form Colac-Coragulac in 1980. In 1986, they dropped Coragulac from the club's name, then in 2001 Colac left the Hampden league to join the Geelong FL.

North Warrnambool were admitted to the league in the 1997 season.

In 1999, Mortlake and Derrinallum merged to form the Western Lions, however the club was not successful and folded during the 2000 season. Mortlake then attempted a new merger with Terang, which has proven successful and continues to the current day, with matches played in both towns.

In 2013 teams from regional centres Hamilton and Portland will compete.

The year 2020 saw the senior football and netball season cancelled as a consequence of the COVID-19 pandemic.

== Clubs ==
=== Locations ===
Locations of the 2025 Hampden FNL clubs. The orange pogs represent Terang Mortlake FNC, which has multiple home grounds in Terang and Mortlake.

=== Current ===
Club	Colours	Nickname	Home Ground	Former League	Est.	Years in comp	HFL Senior Premierships	
Club	Colours	Nickname	Home Ground	Former League	Est.	Years in comp	Total	Years
Camperdown		Magpies	Leura Oval, Camperdown	WDFL	1877	1930–	6	1938, 1951, 1968, 1970, 1999, 2000
Cobden		Bombers	Cobden Recreation Reserve, Cobden	WDFL	1879	1930–	6	1930, 1933, 1948, 1949, 1997, 1998
Hamilton Kangaroos		Kangaroos	Melville Oval, Hamilton	–	2012	2013–	0	—
Koroit		Saints	Victoria Park, Koroit	WDFL	1886	1961–	13	1971, 1973, 2003, 2007, 2009, 2014, 2015, 2016, 2017, 2018, 2019, 2022, 2026
North Warrnambool		Eagles	Bushfield Recreation Reserve, Bushfield	WDFNL	1986	1997–	1	2025
Portland		Tigers	Hanlon Park, Portland	WBFL	1876	2013–	0	—
Port Fairy		Seagulls	Gardens Oval, Port Fairy	WDFL	1868	1949-	1	1958
South Warrnambool		Roosters	Friendly Societies Park, Warrnambool	WDFL	1902	1933–	13	1940, 1954, 1964, 1969, 1974, 1990, 1991, 1994, 1996, 2006, 2011, 2023, 2024
Terang Mortlake		Bloods	Terang Recreation Reserve, Terang and D.C. Farran Oval, Mortlake	–	2001	2001–	3	2004, 2005, 2008
Warrnambool		Blues	Reid Oval, Warrnambool	WDFL	1861	1933–	25	1935, 1937, 1939, 1946, 1947, 1957, 1959, 1960, 1962, 1963, 1966, 1976, 1977, 1978, 1984, 1986, 1987, 1988, 1989, 1992, 2001, 2002, 2010, 2012, 2013

=== Former ===
Club	Colours	Nickname	Home Ground	Former League	Est.	Years in comp	HFL Senior Premierships		Fate
Club	Colours	Nickname	Home Ground	Former League	Est.	Years in comp	Total	Years	Fate
Colac (Colac-Coragulac 1980-86)		Tigers	Central Reserve, Colac	–	1948	1949–2000	10	1950, 1952, 1953, 1961, 1965, 1980, 1982, 1983, 1985, 1993	Moved to Geelong FNL following 2000 season
Coragulac		Hawks	Western Reserve, Colac	PFL	1937	1961–1979	0	—	Merged with Colac following 1979 season
Mortlake		Cats	DC Farran Oval, Mortlake	WDFL	1879	1930–1998	3	1931, 1936, 1975	Merged with Derrinallum to form Western Lions in 1999
Terang		Bloods	Terang Recreation Reserve, Terang	WDFL	1879	1930–2000	9	1932, 1934, 1955, 1956, 1967, 1972, 1979, 1981, 1995	Absorbed remnants of Western Lions to form Terang Mortlake in 2001
Western Lions		Lions	Derrinallum Recreation Reserve, Derrinallum and DC Farran Oval, Mortlake	–	1999	1999–2000	0	—	Folded one round into 2000 season

== Win/loss record ==
Club	Active	Won	Lost	Drawn	Percentage wins	Flags
Camperdown	1930-2025	832	784	16	50.98	6
Cobden	1930-2025	746	869	20	45.63	6
Colac	1949-2000	596	376	10	60.69	10
Coragulac	1961-1979	118	228	2	33.91	0
Hamilton	2013-2025	50	159	1	23.81	0
Koroit	1961-2025	631	588	8	51.39	12
Mortlake	1930-1998	473	634	18	42.04	6
North Warrnambool	1997-2025	227	295	4	43.16	1
Port Fairy	1949-2025	503	883	4	36.19	1
Portland	2013-2025	68	144	1	31.92	0
South Warrnambool	1933-2025	880	720	18	54.42	13
Terang	1930-2001	642	578	10	52.20	8
Terang - Mortlake	2002-2025	239	202	1	54.07	3
Warrnambool	1933-2025	1051	582	21	63.54	25
Western Lions	1999-2000	2	16	0	11.11	0

== Premierships (Football) ==
Seniors

- 1930 Cobden 13 9 87 def Terang 6 30 66
- 1931 Mortlake 15 12 102 def Cobden 9 10 64
- 1932 Terang 15 18 108 def Cobden 13 9 87
- 1933 Cobden 6 13 49 def South Warrnambool 6 6 42
- 1934 Terang 11 15 81 def Mortlake 10 19 79
- 1935 Warrnambool 14 16 100 def Mortlake 10 19 79
- 1936 Mortlake 12 15 87 def Warrnambool 11 16 82
- 1937 Warrnambool 12 14 86 def Camperdown 9 17 71
- 1938 Camperdown 11 19 85 def Warrnambool 9 14 68
- 1939 Warrnambool 14 19 103 def South Warrnambool 14 11 95
- 1940 South Warrnambool 11 21 87 def Warrnambool 10 7 67
- 1941 - 1945 No play due to World War 2
- 1946 Warrnambool 14 14 98 def Camperdown 9 9 63
- 1947 Warrnambool 18 17 125 def Camperdown 9 11 65
- 1948 Cobden 11 13 79 def South Warrnambool 10 6 66
- 1949 Cobden 11 13 79 def Colac 7 11 53
- 1950 Colac 12 8 80 def Warrnambool 10 17 77
- 1951 Camperdown 11 9 75 def Cobden 6 8 44
- 1952 Colac 6 4 40 def Warrnambool 4 9 33
- 1953 Colac 12 6 78 def Cobden 10 12 72
- 1954 South Warrnambool 9 8 62 Defeated Terang 5 8 38
- 1955 Terang 14 18 102 def Colac 14 15 99
- 1956 Terang 14 13 97 def Port Fairy 12 9 81
- 1957 Warrnambool 10 16 76 Defeated Colac 8 8 56
- 1958 Port Fairy 6 16 52 def Colac 6 14 50
- 1959 Warrnambool 19 15 129 def Cobden 5 11 41
- 1960 Warrnambool 15 24 114 def Camperdown 7 6 48
- 1961 Colac 14 14 98 def Camperdown 5 5 35
- 1962 Warrnambool 10 8 68 def Mortlake 8 12 60
- 1963 Warrnambool 9 9 63 def Colac 5 8 38
- 1964 South Warrnambool 13 13 91 def Colac 10 5 65
- 1965 Colac 8 11 59 def Warrnambool 7 10 52
- 1966 Warrnambool 8 18 66 def Mortlake 7 8 50
- 1967 Terang 12 5 77 def Mortlake 8 8 56
- 1968 Camperdown 13 3 81 def Terang 9 7 61
- 1969 South Warrnambool 12 17 89 def Mortlake 12 16 88
- 1970 Camperdown 11 12 78 def Mortlake 11 10 76
- 1971 Koroit 14 9 93 def Port Fairy 11 7 73
- 1972 Terang 15 13 103 def Port Fairy 8 13 61
- 1973 Koroit 10 7 67 def Colac 7 10 52
- 1974 South Warrnambool 7 8 50 def Camperdown 6 6 42
- 1975 Mortlake 11 13 79 def Warrnambool 10 11 71
- 1976 Warrnambool 14 15 99 def Terang 6 11 47
- 1977 Warrnambool 11 14 80 def Terang 10 7 67
- 1978 Warrnambool 13 10 88 def Terang 13 8 86
- 1979 Terang 13 11 89 def Cobden 12 10 82
- 1980 Colac-Coragulac 19 14 128 def Terang 9 12 66
- 1981 Terang 13 16 94 def Colac-Coragulac 7 8 50
- 1982 Colac-Coragulac 14 10 94 def Terang 12 10 82
- 1983 Colac-Coragulac 11 5 71 def Port Fairy 9 6 60
- 1984 Warrnambool 9 15 69 def Cobden 4 5 29
- 1985 Colac-Coragulac 22 14 146 def South Warrnambool 14 6 90
- 1986 Warrnambool 19 9 123 def Camperdown 10 10 70
- 1987 Warrnambool 14 12 96 def Camperdown 12 10 82
- 1988 Warrnambool 12 10 82 def South Warrnambool 10 15 75
- 1989 Warrnambool 21 14 140 def South Warrnambool 11 11 77
- 1990 South Warrnambool 23 21 159 def Colac 5 8 38
- 1991 South Warrnambool 2 6 18 def Terang 1 6 12
- 1992 Warrnambool 20 12 132 def South Warrnambool 13 12 90
- 1993 Colac 15 9 99 def Terang 12 16 88
- 1994 South Warrnambool 19 15 129 def Camperdown 12 15 87
- 1995 Terang 18 12 120 def South Warrnambool 14 11 95
- 1996 South Warrnambool 18 7 115 def Terang 14 9 93
- 1997 Cobden 28 10 178 def Port Fairy 13 12 90
- 1998 Cobden 15 6 96 def South Warrnambool 11 10 76
- 1999 Camperdown 20 9 129 def Colac 12 11 83
- 2000 Camperdown 14 10 94 def Koroit 7 9 51
- 2001 Warrnambool 15 4 94 def Koroit 11 10 76
- 2002 Warrnambool 13 19 97 def Terang 11 7 73
- 2003 Koroit 17 8 110 def Camperdown 15 13 103
- 2004 Terang-Mortlake 18 5 113 def Warrnambool 11 10 76
- 2005 Terang-Mortlake 12 11 83 def Port Fairy 9 8 62
- 2006 South Warrnambool 17 15 117 def Camperdown 13 8 86
- 2007 Koroit 15 13 103 def Cobden 10 9 69
- 2008 Terang-Mortlake 9 14 68 def Warrnambool 3 10 28
- 2009 Koroit 19 7 121 def Warrnambool 11 16 82
- 2010 Warrnambool 8 13 61 def South Warrnambool 5 14 44
- 2011 South Warrnambool 11 14 80 def Warrnambool 5 9 39
- 2012 Warrnambool 15 13 103 def Cobden 10 6 66
- 2013 Warrnambool 13 11 89 def Koroit 6 16 52
- 2014 Koroit 15 9 99 def Warrnambool 12 11 83
- 2015 Koroit 13 14 92 def Warrnambool 7 9 51
- 2016 Koroit 15 10 100 def North Warrnambool 10 7 67
- 2017 Koroit 8 8 56 def Port Fairy 6 5 41
- 2018 Koroit 8 9 57 def Camperdown 6 10 46
- 2019 Koroit 9 9 63 def North Warrnambool 8 12 60
- 2020 In recess due to COVID-19
- 2021 1st: Koroit 2nd: North Warrnambool. Season cancelled after 12 matches due to COVID-19
- 2022 Koroit 5 15 45 def North Warrnambool 4 5 29
- 2023 South Warrnambool 9 8 62 def North Warrnambool 6 5 41
- 2024 South Warrnambool 4 5 29 def North Warrnambool 3 10 28
- 2025 North Warrnambool 13 12 90 def Koroit 7 5 47
- 2026 Koroit 8 12 60 def North Warrnambool 6 11 47

== League Best and Fairest Winners ==
The Maskell Cup was first awarded in 1949 and was later changed to the Maskell Medal.

Senior Football - Maskell Medal

Season	Player	Club	Votes
1949	Max Evans	South Warrnambool	
1950	Ray Lee	South Warrnambool	
1951	Don Grossman	Warrnambool	
1952	John Couttie	Cobden	
1953	John O'Neill	Warrnambool	
1954	Ron Hoy	South Warrnambool	
1955	Ron Hoy	South Warrnambool	
1956	Tim O'Sullivan	Colac	
1957	Ron Hoy	South Warrnambool	
1958	George Swarbrick	Port Fairy	
1959	George Swarbrick	Port Fairy	
1960	Ian Scott	Terang	
1961	Fred Lynch	Coragulac	
1962	Bill McConnell	Warrnambool	
1963	Don Nicholson	Colac	
1964	Gary Hughson	South Warrnambool	
1965	Peter Pianto	Coragulac	
1966	Jim Bell	Mortlake	
1967	Gary Hiscox	Port Fairy	
1968	David Lane	Camperdown	
1969	Les Gibb	Port Fairy	
1970	Hugh Worrall	Cobden	
1971	Graeme Reichman	Mortlake	
1972	Hugh Worrall	Cobden	
1973	Dan Harrington	Coragulac	
1974	Graeme Fitzgerald	Camperdown	
1975	Kevin Leske	Port Fairy	
1976	Graeme Reichman	Mortlake	
1977	Tony Hills; Gary Kelly	Warrnambool; Coragulac	
1978	Rodney Grant	Colac	
1979	Hugh Worrall	Cobden	
1980	Ian Foley	Colac-Coragulac	
1981	Tom Smith	South Warrnambool	
1982	Alan Woodman	Camperdown	
1983	Alan Woodman	Camperdown	
1984	Maurice O'Keefe	Port Fairy	
1985	Peter Anson	Cobden	
1986	Michael Taylor	Port Fairy	
1987	Brian Brown	Colac	
1988	Brian Hinkley	Camperdown	
1989	Phil Bradmore	South Warrnambool	
1990	Martin Mulgrew	Colac	
1991	Wayne Aitken	Mortlake	
1992	Brad Nicholls	Camperdown	
1993	Chris Grumley	Warrnambool	
1994	Nick Hider	Camperdown	
1995	Neale Grundy; Mark Sutherland	Terang; Colac	
1996	Stephen Hammond; Anthony Mahony	Cobden; Koroit	
1997	Jason Mifsud	Koroit	
1998	Wayne Robertson	Cobden	
1999	Mark Bourke	Camperdown	
2000	Paul Jenkinson	Warrnambool	
2001	David Ryan	Terang	
2002	Jason Porter	North Warrnambool	
2003	Nick Hider	Warrnambool	
2004	Luke Vogels	Terang-Mortlake	
2005	Benjamin Kilday; Joe McLaren	South Warrnambool; Koroit	
2006	Benjamin Harris	Camperdown	
2007	Simon O'Keefe	Koroit	
2008	Liam Ryan	North Warrnambool	
2009	Joshua Walters	Warrnambool	
2010	Levi Dare; Liam Ryan	Cobden; North Warrnambool	26
2011	Rhys Raymond; Simon O'Keefe	Warrnambool; Koroit	
2012	Levi Dare; Joseph Dare; Samuel Chapman; Tim Hunt	Cobden; Cobden; Camperdown; Warrnambool	
2013	Ben Goodall	Koroit	
2014	Isaac Templeton	Koroit	
2015	Isaac Templeton	Koroit	
2016	Levi Dare	Cobden	
2017	Manny Sandow	South Warrnambool	25
2018	Brett Harrington	Koroit	25
2019	Jye Turland	Warrnambool	24
2020	In recess >	COVID-19	
2021	Jett Bermingham	North Warrnambool	20
2022	Daniel Jackson	Portland	31
2023	Hamish Sinnott	Camperdown	18
2024	Liam Hoy	Koroit	20
2024	Jett Bermingham	North Warrnambool	20
2025	Lewis Taylor	Terang-Mortlake	22

== Historical Ladders ==
=== 1930 Ladder ===
Club	Wins	Losses	Draws	For	Against	%	Pts
Cobden	11	4	0	1214	1078	112.6	44
Mortlake	10	5	0	1110	1026	108.2	40
Terang	8	7	0	1124	1025	109.7	32
Camperdown	1	14	0	970	1289	75.3	4

- 1st Semi Final Terang 15.11.101 Defeated Mortlake 9.11.65
- 2nd Semi Final Cobden 15.9.99 Defeated Camperdown 8.19.67
- Grand Final Cobden 13.9.87 Defeated Terang 6.30.66

=== 1931 Ladder ===
Club	Wins	Losses	Draws	For	Against	%	Pts
Cobden	11	4	0	1334	875	152.5	44
Mortlake	10	4	1	1160	872	133.0	42
Camperdown	7	8	0	1128	1085	104.0	28
Terang	1	13	1	711	1501	47.4	6

- 1st Semi Final Camperdown 8.17.65 Defeated Terang 5.7.37
- 2nd Semi Final Mortlake 11.15.81 Defeated Cobden 8.17.65
- Preliminary Final Mortlake11.17.83 Defeated Camperdown 7.8.50
- Grand Final Mortlake 15.12.102 Defeated Cobden 9.10.64

=== 1932 Ladder ===
Club	Wins	Losses	Draws	For	Against	%	Pts
Cobden	9	6	0	1172	1090	107.5	36
Terang	9	6	0	1088	1081	100.6	36
Mortlake	7	8	0	978	979	99.9	28
Camperdown	5	10	0	1009	1097	92.0	20

- 1st Semi Final Mortlake 10.9.69 Defeated Camperdown 8.11.59
- 2nd Semi Final Terang 13.12.90 Defeated Cobden 11.11.77
- Preliminary Final Cobden 7.23 65 Drew with Mortlake 9.11.65
- Preliminary Final Replay Cobden 12.17.89 Defeated Mortlake 10.11.71
- Grand Final Terang 15.18.108 Defeated Cobden 13.9.87

=== 1933 Ladder ===
Club	Wins	Losses	Draws	For	Against	%	Pts
Cobden	8	7	0	1410	1256	112.3	32
Mortlake	8	7	0	1136	1051	108.1	32
South Warrnambool	8	7	0	1142	1155	98.9	32
Warrnambool	8	7	0	1311	1371	95.6	32
Terang	7	8	0	1188	1110	100.7	28
Camperdown	6	9	0	1140	1314	86.8	24

- 1st Semi Final South Warrnambool 9.19.73 Defeated Warrnambool 10.5.65
- 2nd Semi Final Cobden 19.13.127 Defeated Mortlake 2.14.26
- Preliminary Final South Warrnambool 13.7.85 Defeated Mortlake 10.11.71
- Grand Final Cobden 6.13.49 Defeated South Warrnambool 6.6.42

=== 1934 Ladder ===
Club	Wins	Losses	Draws	For	Against	%	Pts
Mortlake	12	3	0	1378	970	142.1	48
South Warrnambool	9	6	0	1134	1056	107.4	36
Terang	8	7	0	1316	1261	104.4	32
Warrnambool	8	7	0	1166	1136	102.6	32
Cobden	7	8	0	1362	1281	106.3	28
Camperdown	1	14	0	1065	1717	62.0	4

- 1st Semi Final Terang 16.13.109 Defeated Cobden 9.17.71
- 2nd Semi Final Mortlake 12.13.85 Defeated South Warrnambool 12.12.84
- Preliminary Final South Warrnambool 7.21.63 Drew with Terang 8.15.63
- Preliminary Final Replay Terang 14.13.97 Defeated South Warrnambool 9.14.68
- Grand Final Terang 11.15.81 Defeated Mortlake 10.19.79

=== 1935 Ladder ===
Club	Wins	Losses	Draws	For	Against	%	Pts
Mortlake	12	3	0	1458	1019	143.1	48
Warrnambool	10	5	0	1383	1169	118.3	40
Terang	9	6	0	1168	1086	107.6	36
South Warrnambool	8	7	0	1114	967	115.2	32
Camperdown	5	10	0	1180	1516	77.8	20
Cobden	1	14	0	941	1487	63.3	4

- 1st Semi Final Terang 15.6.96 Defeated South Warrnambool 11.15.81
- 2nd Semi Final Mortlake 9.10.64 Defeated Warrnambool 4.12.36
- Preliminary Final Warrnambool 10.15.75 Defeated Terang 9.14.68
- Grand Final Warrnambool 14.16.100 Defeated Mortlake 10.19.79

=== 1936 Ladder ===
Club	Wins	Losses	Draws	For	Against	%	Pts
Mortlake	10	5	0	1223	1086	112.6	40
Warrnambool	9	6	0	1195	1126	106.1	36
Terang	8	7	0	1212	1075	112.7	32
South Warrnambool	8	7	0	1049	961	109.2	32
Cobden	8	7	0	1112	1219	91.2	32
Camperdown	2	13	0	1081	1405	76.9	8

- Elimination Final South Warrnambool 13.11.89 Defeated Cobden 7.7.49
- 1st Semi Final Terang 24.21.165 Defeated South Warrnambool 11.14.80
- 2nd Semi Final Mortlake 15.17.107 Defeated Warrnambool 14.5.89
- Preliminary Final Warrnambool 10.19.79 Defeated Terang 10.9.69
- Grand Final Mortlake 12.15.87 Defeated Warrnambool 11.16.82

=== 1937 Ladder ===
Club	Wins	Losses	Draws	For	Against	%	Pts
Warrnambool	12	3	0	1267	1055	120.1	48
Camperdown	10	5	0	1327	1238	107.2	40
Mortlake	6	8	1	1217	1415	86.0	26
South Warrnambool	6	9	0	1302	1114	116.9	24
Terang	6	9	0	1143	1293	88.4	24
Cobden	4	10	1	1264	1405	90.0	18

- Elimination Final Terang 12.18.90 Defeated South Warrnambool 11.10.76
- 1st Semi Final Terang 11.13.79 Defeated Mortlake 8.13.61
- 2nd Semi Final Warrnambool 13.13.91 Defeated Camperdown 11.12.78
- Preliminary Final Camperdown 11.9.75 Defeated Terang 7.14.56
- Grand Final Warrnambool 12.14.86 Defeated Camperdown 9.17.71

=== 1938 Ladder ===
Club	Wins	Losses	Draws	For	Against	%	Pts
Camperdown	13	2	0	1577	1019	154.8	52
South Warrnambool	11	4	0	1422	1215	117.0	44
Terang	9	6	0	1503	1194	125.9	36
Warrnambool	7	8	0	1128	1196	94.3	28
Mortlake	4	11	0	1092	1380	79.1	16
Cobden	1	14	0	1010	1728	58.4	4

- 1st Semi Final Warrnambool 17.16.118 Defeated Terang 16.15.111
- 2nd Semi Final Camperdown 7.14.56 Defeated South Warrnambool 8.5.53
- Preliminary Final Warrnambool 16.16.112 Defeated South Warrnambool 7.11.53
- Grand Final Camperdown 11.19.85 Defeated Warrnambool 9.14.68

=== 1939 Ladder ===
Club	Wins	Losses	Draws	For	Against	%	Pts
Warrnambool	10	5	0	1449	1179	122.9	40
South Warrnambool	9	5	1	1470	1244	118.2	38
Cobden	9	6	0	1381	1306	105.7	36
Terang	7	8	0	1217	1302	93.5	28
Camperdown	6	8	1	1300	1362	95.4	26
Mortlake	3	12	0	1124	1548	72.6	12

- 1st Semi Final Cobden 16.19.115 Defeated Terang 7.12.54
- 2nd Semi Final South Warrnambool 8.10.58 Defeated Warrnambool 8.7.55
- Preliminary Final Warrnambool 14.14.98 Defeated Cobden 13.14.92
- Grand Final Warrnambool 14.19.103 Defeated South Warrnambool 14.11.95

=== 1940 Ladder ===
Club	Wins	Losses	Draws	For	Against	%	Pts
South Warrnambool	6	2	0	812	614	132.2	24
Warrnambool	6	2	0	682	536	127.2	32
Terang	4	3	0	679	610	111.3	20
Camperdown	5	3	0	647	630	102.7	20
Cobden	1	6	0	487	695	70.1	8
Mortlake	0	6	0	358	580	61.7	0

- 1st Semi Final Camperdown 14.14.98 Defeated Terang 12.9.81
- 2nd Semi Final South Warrnambool 14.9.93 Defeated Warrnambool 11.15.81
- Preliminary Final Warrnambool 17.18.120 Defeated Camperdown 7.6.48
- Grand Final South Warrnambool 11.21.87 Defeated Warrnambool 10.7.67

=== 1946 Ladder ===
Club	Wins	Losses	Draws	For	Against	%	Pts
Warrnambool	13	2	0	1809	801	225.8	52
Camperdown	13	2	0	1464	945	154.9	52
Terang	7	8	0	1115	1299	85.8	28
South Warrnambool	7	8	0	986	1169	84.3	28
Cobden	3	12	0	990	1321	74.91	12
Mortlake	2	13	0	771	1600	48.2	8

- 1st Semi Final Terang 10.10.70 Defeated South Warrnambool 9.10.64
- 2nd Semi Final Warrnambool 23.18.156 Defeated Camperdown 11.11.77
- Preliminary Final Camperdown 15.10.100 Defeated Terang 15.7.97
- Grand Final Warrnambool 14.14.98 Defeated Camperdown 9.9.63

=== 1947 Ladder ===
Club	Wins	Losses	Draws	For	Against	%	Pts
Camperdown	11	4	0	1405	1077	130.55	44
Warrnambool	9	5	1	1092	942	115.9	38
Cobden	9	6	0	1160	977	118.7	36
Terang	7	8	0	1023	1199	85.3	28
South Warrnambool	6	8	1	994	967	102.6	26
Mortlake	2	13	0	935	1447	64.6	8

- 1st Semi Final Cobden 11.24.90 Defeated Terang 7.10.52
- 2nd Semi Final Camperdown 7.8.50 Defeated Warrnambool 6.12.48
- Preliminary Final Warrnambool 10.12.72 Defeated Cobden 9.9.63
- Grand Final Warrnambool 18.17.125 Defeated Camperdown 9.11.65

=== 1948 Ladder ===
Club	Wins	Losses	Draws	For	Against	%	Pts
Cobden	9	4	2	1365	924	147.7	40
South Warrnambool	10	5	0	1102	797	138.3	40
Camperdown	9	6	0	1132	982	115.3	36
Terang	9	6	0	935	1055	88.6	36
Warrnambool	6	8	1	1029	877	117.3	26
Mortlake	0	14	1	731	1659	44.1	2

- 1st Semi Final Camperdown 22.17.149 Defeated Terang 9.19.73
- 2nd Semi Final Cobden 18.18.126 Defeated South Warrnambool 12.8.80
- Preliminary Final South Warrnambool 3.20.38 Defeated Camperdown 3.13.31
- Grand Final Cobden 11.13.79 Defeated South Warrnambool 10.6.66

=== 1949 Ladder ===
Club	Wins	Losses	Draws	For	Against	%	Pts
Colac	10	4	0	1191	828	143.8	40
Cobden	9	4	1	1172	909	128.9	38
South Warrnambool	9	4	1	1010	836	120.8	38
Warrnambool	9	5	0	1191	929	128.2	36
Camperdown	8	5	1	1240	1173	105.7	34
Mortlake	5	8	1	1216	1118	108.8	22
Terang	2	12	0	810	1344	60.3	8
Port Fairy	2	12	0	817	1510	54.1	8

- 1st Semi Final Warrnambool 10.6.66 Defeated South Warrnambool 4.6.30
- 2nd Semi Final Cobden 10.19.79 Defeated Colac 9.12.66
- Preliminary Final Colac 6.17.53 Defeated Warrnambool 5.13.43
- Grand Final Cobden 11.13.79 Defeated Colac 7.11.53

== 2009 Ladder ==
Hampden FL	Wins	Byes	Losses	Draws	For	Against	%	Pts	Final	Team	G	B	Pts	Team	G	B	Pts
Terang-Mortlake	16	0	2	0	2134	1129	189.02%	64	Elimination	Cobden	10	15	75	Camperdown	9	6	60
Koroit	14	0	4	0	2038	1118	182.29%	56	Qualifying	Koroit	13	10	88	Warrnambool	9	10	64
Warrnambool	14	0	4	0	1662	1207	137.70%	56	1st Semi	Warrnambool	20	10	130	Cobden	4	12	36
Cobden	11	0	7	0	1468	1432	102.51%	44	2nd Semi	Koroit	15	13	103	Terang-Mortlake	12	9	81
Camperdown	5	0	12	1	1300	1704	76.29%	22	Preliminary	Warrnambool	7	13	55	Terang-Mortlake	6	6	42
Port Fairy	5	0	13	0	1118	1865	59.95%	20	Grand	Koroit	19	7	121	Warrnambool	11	16	82
South Warrambool	4	0	14	0	1229	1670	73.59%	16									
North Warrnambool	2	0	15	1	1122	1946	57.66%	10									

== 2010 Ladder ==
Hampden FL	Wins	Byes	Losses	Draws	For	Against	%	Pts	Final	Team	G	B	Pts	Team	G	B	Pts
Warrnambool	15	0	2	1	1806	1072	168.47%	62	Elimination	Koroit	9	17	71	Cobden	9	10	64
Terang-Mortlake	13	0	5	0	1433	1173	122.17%	52	Qualifying	South Warrambool	19	8	122	Terang-Mortlake	11	6	72
South Warrambool	11	0	6	1	1816	1236	146.93%	46	1st Semi	Terang-Mortlake	10	4	64	Koroit	7	8	50
Cobden	11	0	7	0	1488	1182	125.89%	44	2nd Semi	South Warrambool	9	9	63	Warrnambool	2	8	20
Koroit	10	0	7	1	1440	1331	108.19%	42	Preliminary	Warrnambool	18	10	118	Terang-Mortlake	11	11	77
North Warrnambool	5	0	11	2	1194	1758	67.92%	24	Grand	Warrnambool	8	13	61	South Warrambool	5	14	44
Port Fairy	2	0	15	1	1153	1860	61.99%	10									
Camperdown	2	0	16	0	1321	2039	64.79%	8									

== 2011 Ladder ==
Hampden FL	Wins	Byes	Losses	Draws	For	Against	%	Pts	Final	Team	G	B	Pts	Team	G	B	Pts
South Warrambool	17	0	1	0	2168	1067	203.19%	68	Elimination	Terang-Mortlake	12	13	85	North Warrnambool	13	5	83
Koroit	11	0	6	1	1711	1444	118.49%	46	Qualifying	Koroit	12	14	86	Warrnambool	11	11	77
Warrnambool	11	0	7	0	1770	1133	156.22%	44	1st Semi	Warrnambool	14	10	94	Terang-Mortlake	7	8	50
Terang-Mortlake	11	0	7	0	1645	1364	120.60%	44	2nd Semi	South Warrambool	12	13	85	Koroit	9	10	64
North Warrnambool	7	0	11	0	1561	1622	96.24%	28	Preliminary	Warrnambool	8	16	64	Koroit	8	14	62
Camperdown	7	0	11	0	1408	1688	83.41%	28	Grand	South Warrambool	11	14	80	Warrnambool	5	9	39
Cobden	6	0	11	1	1338	1771	75.55%	26									
Port Fairy	1	0	17	0	1045	2557	40.87%	4									

== 2012 Ladder ==
Hampden FL	Wins	Byes	Losses	Draws	For	Against	%	Pts	Final	Team	G	B	Pts	Team	G	B	Pts
Warrnambool	14	0	4	0	1795	1083	165.74%	56	Elimination	North Warrnambool	10	13	73	Koroit	8	10	58
Camperdown	13	0	5	0	1729	1142	151.40%	52	Qualifying	Cobden	13	5	83	Camperdown	10	11	71
Cobden	11	0	7	0	1251	1186	105.48%	44	1st Semi	North Warrnambool	17	11	113	Camperdown	8	3	51
North Warrnambool	10	0	8	0	1752	1240	141.29%	40	2nd Semi	Warrnambool	11	16	82	Cobden	10	9	69
Koroit	10	0	8	0	1520	1171	129.80%	40	Preliminary	Cobden	19	8	122	North Warrnambool	10	10	70
South Warrambool	9	0	9	0	1463	1346	108.69%	36	Grand	Warrnambool	15	13	103	Cobden	10	6	66
Terang-Mortlake	5	0	13	0	1200	1549	77.47%	20									
Port Fairy	0	0	18	0	680	2673	25.44%	0									

== 2013 Ladder ==
Hampden FL	Wins	Byes	Losses	Draws	For	Against	%	Pts	Final	Team	G	B	Pts	Team	G	B	Pts
Warrnambool	15	0	3	0	1728	1040	166.15%	60	Elimination	North Warrnambool	14	12	96	Camperdown	7	8	50
Cobden	14	0	3	1	1629	1098	148.36%	58	Qualifying	Koroit	10	15	75	Cobden	9	12	66
Koroit	14	0	4	0	1597	943	169.35%	56	1st Semi	North Warrnambool	21	10	136	Cobden	5	7	37
North Warrnambool	14	0	4	0	2010	1322	152.04%	56	2nd Semi	Koroit	13	14	92	Warrnambool	10	5	65
Camperdown	11	0	7	0	1673	1347	124.20%	44	Preliminary	Warrnambool	21	9	135	North Warrnambool	9	12	66
Portland	8	0	10	0	1313	1450	90.55%	32	Grand	Warrnambool	13	11	89	Koroit	6	16	52
Terang-Mortlake	6	0	12	0	1188	1558	76.25%	24									
Hamilton	4	0	14	0	1217	2060	59.08%	16									
Port Fairy	2	0	15	1	1055	1862	56.66%	10									
South Warrambool	1	0	17	0	1007	1737	57.97%	4									

== 2014 Ladder ==
Hampden FL	Wins	Byes	Losses	Draws	For	Against	%	Pts	Final	Team	G	B	Pts	Team	G	B	Pts
Warrnambool	17	0	1	0	1770	947	186.91%	68	Elimination	Terang Mortlake	7	15	57	Camperdown	8	8	56
Koroit	14	0	4	0	1529	1107	138.12%	56	Qualifying	Koroit	16	11	107	North Warrnambool	12	15	87
North Warrnambool	11	0	7	0	1589	1371	115.90%	44	1st Semi	North Warrnambool	15	7	97	Terang Mortlake	13	14	92
Terang-Mortlake	10	0	8	0	1361	1338	101.72%	40	2nd Semi	Warrnambool	20	14	134	Koroit	9	8	62
Camperdown	8	0	10	0	1278	1253	102.00%	32	Preliminary	Koroit	16	18	114	North Warrnambool	14	5	89
Portland	8	0	10	0	1367	1438	95.06%	32	Grand	Koroit	15	9	99	Warrnambool	12	11	83
Hamilton	7	0	11	0	1321	1544	85.56%	28									
Cobden	6	0	12	0	1396	1681	83.05%	24									
South Warrambool	5	0	13	0	1240	1752	70.78%	20									
Port Fairy	4	0	14	0	1123	1543	72.78%	16									

== 2015 Ladder ==
Hampden FL	Wins	Byes	Losses	Draws	For	Against	%	Pts	Final	Team	G	B	Pts	Team	G	B	Pts
Koroit	17	0	1	0	2158	833	259.06%	68	Elimination	Terang Mortlake	12	10	82	Port Fairy	8	9	57
Warrnambool	15	0	3	0	1972	1010	195.25%	60	Qualifying	Warrnambool	25	7	157	North Warrnambool	7	6	48
North Warrnambool	12	0	6	0	1851	1395	132.69%	48	1st Semi	Terang Mortlake	14	18	102	North Warrnambool	13	10	88
Port Fairy	12	0	6	0	1838	1392	132.04%	48	2nd Semi	Koroit	17	15	117	Warrnambool	5	10	40
Terang-Mortlake	10	0	8	0	1388	1407	98.65%	40	Preliminary	Warrnambool	16	24	120	Terang Mortlake	8	9	57
Camperdown	7	0	11	0	1261	1639	76.94%	28	Grand	Koroit	13	14	92	Warrnambool	7	9	51
South Warrambool	5	0	13	0	1367	1927	70.94%	20									
Cobden	5	0	13	0	1147	2017	56.87%	20									
Hamilton	4	0	14	0	1045	1782	58.64%	16									
Portland	3	0	15	0	1315	1940	67.78%	12									

== 2016 Ladder ==
Hampden FL	Wins	Byes	Losses	Draws	For	Against	%	Pts	Final	Team	G	B	Pts	Team	G	B	Pts
North Warrnambool	16	0	2	0	2012	1116	180.29%	64	Elimination	Port Fairy	12	15	87	Camperdown	12	7	79
Koroit	14	0	4	0	1578	892	176.91%	56	Qualifying	Koroit	7	19	61	Warrnambool	4	6	30
Warrnambool	12	0	5	1	1520	1132	134.28%	50	1st Semi	Port Fairy	13	4	82	Warrnambool	1	11	17
Port Fairy	11	0	7	0	1657	1427	116.12%	44	2nd Semi	North Warrnambool	12	7	79	Koroit	10	6	66
Camperdown	9	0	9	0	1492	1414	105.52%	36	Preliminary	Koroit	8	9	57	Port Fairy	7	10	52
Cobden	8	0	9	1	1334	1357	98.31%	34	Grand	Koroit	15	10	100	North Warrnambool	10	7	67
Portland	7	0	11	0	1325	1464	90.51%	28									
South Warrambool	7	0	11	0	1194	1758	67.92%	28									
Terang-Mortlake	3	0	15	0	1261	1614	78.13%	12									
Hamilton	2	0	16	0	980	2179	44.97%	8									

== 2017 Ladder ==
Hampden FL	Wins	Byes	Losses	Draws	For	Against	%	Pts	Final	Team	G	B	Pts	Team	G	B	Pts
Koroit	16	0	2	0	1900	945	201.06%	64	Elimination	Cobden	15	17	107	North Warrnambool	6	8	44
Port Fairy	15	0	3	0	1992	1014	196.45%	60	Qualifying	Port Fairy	14	11	95	South Warrnambool	13	8	86
Cobden	12	0	6	1	1505	1346	111.81%	50	1st Semi	Cobden	17	7	109	South Warrnambool	10	8	68
South Warrambool	12	0	6	0	1620	1216	133.22%	48	2nd Semi	Port Fairy	11	12	78	Koroit	7	19	61
North Warrnambool	10	0	8	0	1641	1317	124.60%	40	Preliminary	Koroit	11	24	90	Cobden	6	9	45
Camperdown	7	0	11	0	1386	1823	76.03%	28	Grand	Koroit	8	8	56	Port Fairy	6	5	41
Warrnambool	6	0	12	0	1246	1479	84.25%	24									
Terang-Mortlake	6	0	12	0	1218	1590	76.60%	24									
Portland	4	0	14	0	999	1898	52.63%	16									
Hamilton	2	0	16	0	1088	1967	55.31%	8									

== VFL/AFL players ==
- Dick Harris – Warrnambool to Richmond
- Thorold Merrett – Cobden to Collingwood
- Alistair Lord – Cobden to Geelong
- Stewart Lord – Cobden to Geelong
- Peter Pianto – Coragulac to Geelong
- Stephen Theodore – Coragulac to St.Kilda
- John Rantall – Cobden to South Melbourne
- John Cassin – Colac to Essendon
- Amon Buchanan – Colac to South Melbourne
- Austin McCrabb – Colac to Geelong to Hawthorn
- Kevin Neale – South Warrnambool to St.Kilda
- John Northey – Mortlake to Richmond
- Ronnie Wearmouth – Terang to Collingwood
- Michael Turner – Warrnambool to Geelong
- Paul Couch – Warrnambool to Geelong
- Simon Hogan – Warrnambool to Geelong
- Ross Thornton – Camperdown to Fitzroy
- Noel Mugavin – Port Fairy to Fitzroy
- Leon Harris – Mortlake to Fitzroy
- Bernie Harris – Mortlake to Fitzroy, Brisbane Bears, St Kilda
- Ken Hinkley – Camperdown to Fitzroy then Geelong
- Paul Broderick – Camperdown to Fitzroy then Richmond
- Charlie Payne – Terang to Essendon
- Ian Payne – Terang to Essendon
- Leon Cameron – South Warrnambool to Footscray to Richmond
- Kerrin Hayes – Port Fairy to Fitzroy
- Adrian Gleeson – Koroit to Carlton
- Wayne Schwass – South Warrnambool to North Melbourne to Sydney
- Scott Lucas – Camperdown to Essendon
- Chris Heffernan – Terang to Essendon to Melbourne to Essendon
- Jonathan Brown – South Warrnambool to Brisbane
- Jordan Lewis – Warrnambool to Hawthorn to Melbourne
- Joe McLaren – Koroit to St.Kilda then North Melbourne
- Gary Keane – Koroit to Fitzroy
- Daniel O'Keefe – Warrnambool to Sydney
- Luke Vogels – Terang Mortlake to Sydney
- Gary Rohan – Cobden to Sydney
- Ben Cunnington – Cobden to North Melbourne
- Luke Rounds – Terang Mortlake to Collingwood
- Jordie McKenzie – Terang to Melbourne
- Billie Smedts – North Warrnambool to Geelong Falcons to Geelong
- David Haynes – North Warrnambool to West Coast Eagles to Geelong
- Josh Corbett – North Warrnambool to Gold Coast to Fremantle
- Jackson Merrett – Cobden to Essendon
- Martin Gleeson – Koroit to Essendon
- Zach Merrett – Cobden to Essendon
- Kevin O'Keeffe – Terang to Fitzroy
- Daryl Salmon – Terang to Collingwood
- Lewis Taylor – Mortlake to Brisbane
- Daryl Griffiths – Terang to St Kilda
- Brian McKenzie – Terang to Collingwood
- Hugh Worrall – Cobden to Fitzroy
- Alan McConnell – Terang to Footscray

== Bibliography ==
- Evergreen Hampden: The Hampden Football League and its people, 1930–1976 by Fred Bond & Don Grossman, 1979 – ISBN 0868251089
- History of Football in the Western District by John Stoward – Aussie Footy Books, 2008 – ISBN 9780957751590
