= Warrnambool District Football League =

Australian rules football competition

- Founded: 1946

The Warrnambool District Football League is an Australian rules football competition based in and around Warrnambool. It is a ten team competition starting in April and finishing in September. The league was founded in 1946.

== History ==
While the history of Warrnambool & District FL commenced in 1946 there were several other leagues that fulfilled the needs for senior age players before the WW2.

When the Warrnambool DFA merged with the Corangamite FA in 1924 to form the Western District FL it created a void for young footballers who were not able to play for the major town teams.

In 1924 they organised ward football, Warrnambool was divided into four wards, Albert, Merri, Hopkins and Victoria wards.this lasted four years before being replaced by Warrnambool City Association. In 1931 the Warrnambool Junior Football Association came into being and lasted until the hostilities of WW2

== Clubs ==
=== Locations ===
Club locations - Warrnambool	Club locations - Greater Warrnambool

=== Current ===
Club	Colours	Nickname	Home Ground	Former League	Est.	Years in WDFNL	WDFL Senior Premierships	
Club	Colours	Nickname	Home Ground	Former League	Est.	Years in WDFNL	Total	Years
Allansford (West End-Allansford 1971-2001)		Cats	Allansford Recreation Reserve, Allansford	–	1971	1971-	7	1971, 1976, 1978, 1980, 1981, 1983, 1987
Dennington		Dogs	Dennington Recreation Reserve, Dennington	WCFA	1900s	1953-	4	1966, 1982, 1988, 2015
Kolora Noorat		Power	Noorat Recreation Reserve, Noorat	–	2003	2003-	5	2009, 2010, 2011, 2017, 2019
Merrivale		Tigers	Merrivale Recreation Reserve, Warrnambool	WCFA	1931	1946-	7	1958, 1979, 1991, 1996, 2003, 2006, 2014
Nirranda		Blues	Nirranda Recreation Reserve, Nirranda	HFL	1900s	1992-	8	1999, 2016, 2018, 2022, 2023, 2024, 2025, 2026
Old Collegians (YCW 1951-52)		Warriors	Davidson Oval, Warrnambool	–	1951	1951-	8	1956, 1964, 1965, 1969, 1970, 1984, 1989, 1992
Panmure		Bulldogs	Panmure Recreation Reserve, Panmure	HMFNL	1919	1997-	5	1997, 2001, 2002, 2012, 2013
Russells Creek		Kangaroos	Mack Oval, Warrnambool	–	1931	1946-	11	1946, 1947, 1957, 1963, 1973, 1974, 1990, 1998, 2000, 2004, 2005
South Rovers		Lions	Walter Oval, Warrnambool	WDJFA	1919	1946-	5	1975, 1985, 1986, 1993, 2007
Timboon		Demons	Timboon Recreation Reserve, Timboon	–	2002	2003-	1	2008

=== Former ===
Club	Colours	Nickname	Home Ground	Former League	Est.	Years in WDFNL	WDFL Senior Premierships		Fate
Club	Colours	Nickname	Home Ground	Former League	Est.	Years in WDFNL	Total	Years	Fate
Bushfield		Bulldogs	Bushfield Recreation Reserve, Bushfield	HFL	1900s	1959–1985	1	1977	Merged with Grassmere to form Northern Districts in 1986
Deakin University (W.I.A.E 1978-91)		Sharks	The Pond, Warrnambool and DC Farran Oval, Mortlake	–	1977	1977–2016	0	-	Folded in 2017
East Warrnambool (East Stars 1946-c.1964)		Bombers	Reid Oval, Warrnambool	WCFA	1900s	1946–2019	2	1967, 1995	Went into recess in 2020 due to COVID, formally folded in 2025
Grassmere		Magpies	Purnim Recreation Reserve, Purnim	HFL	1900s	1959–1985	3	1960, 1968, 1972	Merged with Bushfield to form Northern Districts in 1986
Northern Districts		Saints	Bushfield Recreation Reserve, Bushfield	–	1986	1986–1997	1	1994	Moved to Hampden FNL in 1997 under the name North Warrnambool
Tower Hill		Demons	Killarney Recreation Reserve, Killarney	PFFL	1919	1958–1983	2	1959, 1961	Folded in 1984
Wangoom			Wangoom Recreation Reserve, Wangoom	HFL	1919	1949	0	-	Folded in 1950s
West End			Walter Oval, Warrnambool	–	1920s	1946–1970	9	1948, 1949, 1950, 1951, 1952, 1953, 1954, 1955, 1962	Merged with Allansford to form West End-Allansford in 1971
Yambuk		Blues	Yambuk Recreation Reserve, Yambuk	SWDFNL	1920s	1981–1987	0	-	Folded in 1988

== Founding ==
- West End (merged with Allansford in 1971)
- South Warrnambool Juniors (now known as South Rovers)
- Merrivale
- Russells Creek

== Notable players ==
Dave Hughes Old Collegians

Luke Thompson Timboon

Hugh McCluggage Allansford

Jamarra Ugle-Hagan East Warrnambool

Leon Cameron East Warrnambool

Ben Cross East Warrnambool

Nick Bourke Kolora Noorat

Thomas Walker Kolora Noorat

== Premiers ==
- 1946 Russell Creek 9 6 60 def South Juniors 8 8 56
- 1947 Russell Creek 7 12 54 def West End 6 8 44
- 1948 West End 8 16 64 def South Rovers 6 12 48
- 1949 West End 10 4 64 def East Stars 4 12 36
- 1950 West End 10 12 72 def Merrivale 1 10 16
- 1951 West End 10 8 68 def Merrivale 7 9 51
- 1952 West End 8 5 53 def Merrivale 5 15 45
- 1953 West End 19 7 121 def Russell Creek 8 12 60
- 1954 West End 13 14 92 def Merrivale 6 18 54
- 1955 West End 7 8 50 def Old Collegians 4 13 37
- 1956 Old Collegians 13 16 94 def South Rovers 8 10 58
- 1957 Russell Creek 10 11 71 def South Rovers 6 2 38
- 1958 Merrivale 13 15 93 def Russell Creek 13 13 91
- 1959 Tower Hill 9 10 64 def Grassmere 3 3 21
- 1960 Grassmere 11 8 74 def South Rovers 9 7 61
- 1961 Tower Hill 5 12 42 def Old Collegians 3 5 23
- 1962 West End 7 10 52 def Old Collegians 6 9 45
- 1963 Russell Creek 9 14 68 def Old Collegians 3 7 25
- 1964 Old Collegians 7 13 55 def Russell Creek 6 11 47
- 1965 Old Collegians 8 11 59 def Bushfield 8 9 57
- 1966 Dennington 12 15 87 def Old Collegians 9 7 61
- 1967 East Warrnambool 10 12 72 def Old Collegians 10 7 67
- 1968 Grassmere 7 11 53 def Merrivale 7 8 50
- 1969 Old Collegians 9 6 60 def Merrivale 7 12 54
- 1970 Old Collegians 16 10 106 def Dennington 10 14 74
- 1971 WE Allansford 13 15 93 def Merrivale 12 18 90
- 1972 Grassmere 15 15 105 def Dennington 11 11 77
- 1973 Russell Creek 15 11 101 def Dennington 11 12 78
- 1974 Russell Creek 9 7 61 def Merrivale 5 9 39
- 1975 South Rovers 15 11 101 def Russell Creek 11 11 77
- 1976 WE Allansford 16 15 111 def East Warrnambool 12 10 82
- 1977 Bushfield 12 16 88 def East Warrnambool 9 6 60
- 1978 WE Allansford 16 14 110 def Dennington 8 14 62
- 1979 Merrivale 12 10 82 def WE Allansford 10 13 73
- 1980 WE Allansford 12 18 90 def Dennington 5 9 39
- 1981 WE Allansford 18 14 122 Defeated Dennington 13 15 93
- 1982 Dennington 19 14 128 def WE Allansford 16 15 111
- 1983 WE Allansford 21 19 145 def Dennington 9 7 61
- 1984 Old Collegians 14 11 95 def WE Allansford 8 13 61
- 1985 South Rovers 18 11 119 def WE Allansford 8 18 66
- 1986 South Rovers 14 12 96 def Dennington 4 5 29
- 1987 WE Allansford 16 12 108 def Old Collegians 13 9 87
- 1988 Dennington 10 14 74 def Old Collegians 6 8 44
- 1989 Old Collegians 19 18 132 def Dennington 8 11 59
- 1990 Russell Creek 12 11 83 def Institute 10 15 75
- 1991 Merrivale 16 16 112 def Old Collegians 14 9 93
- 1992 Old Collegians 8 9 57 def Northern Districts 3 10 28
- 1993 South Rovers 14 10 94 def Nirranda 8 16 64
- 1994 Northern Districts 19 16 130 def East Warrnambool 9 13 67
- 1995 East Warrnambool 33 10 208 def Merrivale 10 5 65
- 1996 Merrivale 24 20 164 def Russell Creek 16 6 102
- 1997 Panmure 16 8 104 def Merrivale 11 13 79
- 1998 Russell Creek 15 7 97 def Panmure 11 10 76
- 1999 Nirranda 10 7 67 def Russell Creek 5 5 35
- 2000 Russell Creek 10 8 68 def Deakin Uni 9 7 61
- 2001 Panmure 16 3 99 def Deakin Uni 11 11 77
- 2002 Panmure 11 8 74 def Merrivale 6 8 44
- 2003 Merrivale 19 7 121 def Russell Creek 17 8 110
- 2004 Russell Creek 22 12 144 def Allansford 4 12 36
- 2005 Russell Creek 19 13 127 def Old Collegians 14 12 96
- 2006 Merrivale 20 16 136 def Dennington 12 9 81
- 2007 South Rovers 19 10 124 def Timboon 17 16 118
- 2008 Timboon 18 12 120 def Kolora-Noorat 17 9 111
- 2009 Kolora-Noorat 12 11 83 def Timboon 5 3 33
- 2010 Kolora-Noorat 11 6 72 def Dennington 9 10 64
- 2011 Kolora-Noorat 15 12 102 def Old Collegians 12 15 87
- 2012 Panmure 9 4 58 def Kolora-Noorat 7 12 54
- 2013 Panmure 13 13 91 def Dennington 5 11 41
- 2014 Merrivale 11 9 75 def Panmure 6 12 66
- 2015 Dennington 12 15 87 def Merrivale 12 7 79
- 2016 Nirranda 6 9 46 def Old Collegians 5 8 38
- 2017 Kolora Noorat 17 7 109 def Old Collegians 8 7 55
- 2018 Nirranda 10 11 71 def Old Collegians 5 10 40 (3 GFs in a row)
- 2019 Kolora-Noorat 10 8 68 def Nirranda 3 14 32
- 2020 League in recess due to COVID19 pandemic
- 2022 Nirranda 16 22 118 def Panmure 4 7 31
- 2023 Nirranda 9 8 62 def Merrivale 6 5 41
- 2024 Nirranda 9 10 64 def Merrivale 9 6 60
- 2025 Nirranda 10 11 71 def Allansford 9 4 58
- 2026 Nirranda 15 6 96 def Allansford 10 10 70

== Esam Medal (Football Best & Fairest Seniors) ==
- 1946 J. Maguire, South Juniors, 9 votes
- 1947 Paddy O’Keefe, East Stars, 12 votes
- 1947 Stuart Isles, West End, 11 votes
- 1947 Dudley Maslin, Merrivale, 10 votes
- 1947 Bill Maguire, South Rovers, 8 votes
- 1948 Kevin O’Keefe, East Stars, 17 votes
- 1949 Jack Hawthorne, South Rovers, 32 votes
- 1950 Kevin O’Keefe, East Stars, 21 votes
- 1951 John Devlin, South Rovers, 22 votes
- 1952 Kevin Bren, Russells Creek, 21 votes
- 1953 Kevin Bren, Russells Creek, 19 votes
- 1954 Gavin Gleeson, Merrivale, 14 votes
- 1954 Neil Johnstone, Dennington, 14 votes
- 1955 Jim Fitzgerald, South Rovers, 14 votes
- 1956 Lionel Lovett, Dennington, 23 votes
- 1957 Neville Anders, Tower Hill, 33 votes
- 1958 Anthony Ryan, Old Collegians, 20 votes
- 1959 Jim Bushell, Tower Hill, 21 votes
- 1960 Peter Madden, Tower Hill, 14 votes
- 1960 John Carmody, Merrivale, 14 votes
- 1961 Brian Primmer, Russells Creek, 17 votes
- 1961 Robert Edwards, Bushfield, 17 votes
- 1962 Brian Primmer, Russells Creek, 16 votes
- 1962 Les Hawkins, Old Collegians, 16 votes
- 1962 Noel Lawson, South Rovers, 16 votes
- 1963 Norm McCullagh, South Rovers, 25 votes
- 1964 Gerry Lane, Tower Hill, 27 votes
- 1965 Norm McCullagh, South Rovers, 24 votes
- 1966 Ron Reed, Dennington, 26 votes
- 1967 Peter Lake, West End, 23 votes
- 1968 Basil Ryan, Grassmere, 19 votes
- 1968 William Dwyer, Tower Hill, 19 votes
- 1969 Noel Thornton, Dennington, 20 votes
- 1970 Barry Sullivan, South Rovers, 25 votes
- 1971 Norm Thwaites, West End-Allansford, 22 votes
- 1972 Pat Gleeson, Grassmere, 20 votes
- 1973 Glendon Henry, West End-Allansford, 18 votes
- 1974 Brendan Moloney, Tower Hill, 26 votes
- 1975 Jeff Griffiths, East Warrnambool, 27 votes
- 1976 Michael Hamblin, Merrivale, 21 votes
- 1977 Brendan Moloney, Tower Hill, 24 votes
- 1978 Frank King, Tower Hill, 25 votes
- 1979 Michael Hamblin, Merrivale, 23 votes
- 1980 Terry Carr, West End-Allansford, 29 votes
- 1981 Gary McLeod, Grassmere, 22 votes
- 1982 Wayne Cox, Dennington, 33 votes
- 1983 Wayne Cox, Dennington, 23 votes
- 1984 Wayne Cox, Dennington, 30 votes
- 1985 Wayne Cox, Dennington, 18 votes
- 1986 Peter Doolan, Old Collegians, 22 votes
- 1987 Iain Jackson, Russells Creek, 15 votes
- 1987 Don Steel, West End-Allansford, 15 votes
- 1987 Jamie Darmody, Northern Districts, 15 votes
- 1988 John Lyons, East Warrnambool, 28 votes
- 1989 Robert Mifsud, Old Collegians, 22 votes
- 1990 Murray Turner, Dennington, 27 votes
- 1991 David Cassidy, Merrivale, 26 votes
- 1992 Gary Rowbottom, West End-Allansford, 26 votes
- 1993 Ken Wines, Northern Districts, 20 votes
- 1994 Dean Picken, South Rovers, 19 votes
- 1994 Jason Porter, Merrivale, 19 votes
- 1995 Simon Cross, East Warrnambool, 28 votes
- 1996 Dean Picken, South Rovers, 25 votes
- 1997 Leo Duynhoven, Old Collegians, 21 votes
- 1998 Jamie Neave, Merrivale, 21 votes
- 1999 Jodie Bailie, Russells Creek, 24 votes
- 2000 Peter Hobbs, Panmure, 25 votes
- 2001 Jamie Squires, Dennington, 23 votes
- 2002 Brad Sheen, Allansford, 20 votes
- 2003 Chris Morrison, Deakin University, 23 votes
- 2004 Matt Scoble, East Warrnambool, 22 votes
- 2005 Troy Richardson, Old Collegians, 22 votes
- 2006 Klint Wagstaff, Timboon Demons, 26 votes
- 2007 Matthew Steel, Allansford, 37 votes
- 2008 Matthew Steel, Allansford, 30 votes
- 2009 Luke Madden, Kolora-Noorat, 32 votes
- 2010 Jye Bidmade, Panmure, 35 votes
- 2011 Bradley Johnson, Kolora-Noorat, 24 votes
- 2012 Corey Rounds, Kolora-Noorat, 31 votes
- 2012 Nicholas Johnstone, Allansford, 31 votes
- 2013 Brad McCosh, South Rovers, 25 votes
- 2014 Nicholas Johnstone, Allansford, 22 votes
- 2015 Josh Sobey, Merrivale, 19 votes
- 2016 Joseph Conheady, Kolora-Noorat, 22 votes
- 2017 Scott Lenehan, Old Collegians, 25 votes
- 2018 Andrew McMeel, Russells Creek, 25 votes
- 2019 Andrew McMeel, Russells Creek, 19 votes
- 2020 No games played due to COVID-19
- 2021 Scott Carlin, Nirranda, 24 votes
- 2022 Blair McCutcheon, Merrivale, 22 votes
- 2023 John Paulin, Nirranda, 30 votes
- 2024 Logan McLeod, Russells Creek, 19 votes
- 2025 Manny Sandow, Merrivale, 33 votes
- 2026 Bayley Thompson, Timboon, 24 votes

== Changing teams ==
1947

- East Stars
- Koroit Seconds (one season only)
- South Warrnambool Juniors become South Rovers

1949

- Wangoom (one season only)

1951

- YCW (renamed Old Collegians in 1953)

1953

- Dennington

1957

- Tower Hill joined from Port Fairy FL

1959

- Bushfield joined from Purnim FL
- Grassmere joined from Purnim FL

1965

- East Stars become East Warrnambool

1970

- West End and Allansford from (Purnim FL) merged to form West End Allansford

1977

- W.I.A.E. (Warrnambool Institute of Advanced Education) joined

1981

- Yambuk joined

1984

- Tower Hill folded

1986

- Northern Districts created from (merger of Bushfield and Grassmere)

1988

- Yambuk folded

1992

- Nirranda
- W.I.A.E change name to Deakin University

1997

- Northern Districts joined the Hampden League as North Warrnambool
- Panmure

2003

- Timboon Demons
- Kolora-Noorat

2017

- Deakin University Folded

2019

- East Warrnambool went into recess

== 2021 Ladder ==
Warrnambool DFL	Wins	Byes	Losses	Draws	For	Against	%	Pts
Nirranda	13	0	0	0	1687	445	379.10%	52
Kolora-Noorat	12	0	1	0	1493	599	249.25%	48
Merrivale	9	0	4	0	1280	653	196.02%	36
Panmure	8	0	5	0	1245	752	165.56%	32
South Rovers	6	0	7	0	1122	891	125.93%	24
Russell Creek	6	0	7	0	1079	983	109.77%	24
Old Collegians	5	0	8	0	687	1303	52.72%	20
Allansford	4	0	9	0	574	1204	47.67%	16
Timboon Demons	2	0	11	0	589	1330	44.29%	8
Dennington	0	0	13	0	311	1907	16.31%	0

- Season incomplete and Finals cancelled due to State Government lockdown

== 2022 Ladder ==
Warrnambool DFL	Wins	Byes	Losses	Draws	For	Against	%	Pts	Final	Team	G	B	Pts	Team	G	B	Pts
Nirranda	17	0	1	0	1956	628	311.46%	68	Elimination	Merrivale	11	7	73	Russell Creek	7	7	49
Panmure	15	0	3	0	2090	963	217.03%	60	Qualifying	Panmure	12	13	85	Kolora-Noorat	9	8	62
Kolora-Noorat	13	0	5	0	1497	1030	145.34%	52	1st Semi	Kolora-Noorat	13	14	92	Merrivale	11	2	68
Merrivale	12	0	6	0	1676	890	188.31%	48	2nd Semi	Nirranda	11	14	80	Panmure	8	11	59
Russell Creek	12	0	6	0	1840	1050	175.24%	48	Preliminary	Panmure	13	13	91	Kolora-Noorat	14	5	89
South Rovers	9	0	9	0	1521	1456	104.46%	36	Grand	Nirranda	16	22	118	Panmure	4	7	31
Allansford	4	0	14	0	1072	1652	64.89%	16									
Dennington	4	0	14	0	777	1962	39.60%	16									
Old Collegians	3	0	15	0	846	1798	47.05%	12									
Timboon Demons	1	0	17	0	491	2337	21.01%	4									

== 2023 Ladder ==
Warrnambool DFL	Wins	Byes	Losses	Draws	For	Against	%	Pts	Final	Team	G	B	Pts	Team	G	B	Pts
Merrivale	18	0	0	0	2061	528	390.34%	72	Elimination	Kolora-Noorat	11	10	76	Russell Creek	10	11	71
Nirranda	15	0	3	0	1811	688	263.23%	60	Qualifying	Nirranda	13	8	86	Panmure	11	8	74
Panmure	13	0	5	0	1806	911	198.24%	52	1st Semi	Kolora-Noorat	14	11	95	Panmure	12	7	79
Kolora-Noorat	11	0	7	0	1541	859	179.39%	44	2nd Semi	Merrivale	4	7	31	Nirranda	8	8	56
Russell Creek	11	0	7	0	1430	1353	105.69%	44	Preliminary	Merrivale	12	10	82	Kolora-Noorat	5	10	40
Allansford	10	0	8	0	1372	1153	118.99%	40	Grand	Nirranda	9	8	62	Merrivale	6	5	41
South Rovers	5	0	13	0	1013	1722	58.83%	20									
Dennington	4	0	14	0	782	2031	38.50%	16									
Timboon Demons	3	0	15	0	639	1548	41.28%	12									
Old Collegians	0	0	18	0	620	2282	27.17%	0									

== 2024 Ladder ==
Warrnambool DFL	Wins	Byes	Losses	Draws	For	Against	%	Pts	Final	Team	G	B	Pts	Team	G	B	Pts
Nirranda	16	0	2	0	2141	585	365.98%	64	Elimination	Allansford	13	13	91	Dennington	8	6	54
Merrivale	15	0	3	0	1858	771	240.99%	60	Qualifying	Merrivale	17	12	114	Russells Creek	4	6	30
Russells Creek	15	0	3	0	2195	936	234.51%	60	1st Semi	Russells Creek	13	6	84	Panmure	7	9	51
Allansford	14	0	4	0	1601	1168	137.07%	56	2nd Semi	Merrivale	13	10	88	Nirranda	9	7	61
Dennington	6	0	12	0	1168	1503	77.71%	24	Preliminary	Nirranda	10	12	72	Russells Creek	8	4	52
Panmure	6	0	12	0	1281	1731	74.00%	24	Grand	Nirranda	9	10	64	Merrivale	9	6	60
Kolora-Noorat	6	0	12	0	993	1625	61.11%	24									
Timboon Demons	6	0	12	0	886	1672	52.99%	24									
Old Collegians	4	0	14	0	984	1608	61.19%	16									
South Rovers	2	0	16	0	679	2187	31.05%	8									

== 2025 Ladder ==
Warrnambool DFL	Wins	Byes	Losses	Draws	For	Against	%	Pts	Final	Team	G	B	Pts	Team	G	B	Pts
Merrivale	17	0	1	0	2391	680	351.62%	68	Qualifying	Merrivale	7	12	54	Allansford	9	7	61
Allansford	16	0	2	0	2098	926	226.57%	64	Elimination	Nirranda	12	18	90	Old Collegians	6	8	44
Russells Creek	13	0	5	0	2110	929	227.13%	52	1st Semi	Russells Creek	6	7	43	Nirranda	11	9	75
Nirranda	13	0	5	0	1881	936	200.96%	52	2nd Semi	Allansford	9	7	61	Merrivale	7	12	54
Old Collegians	8	0	10	0	1369	1424	96.14%	32	Preliminary	Nirranda	12	12	84	Merrivale	3	4	22
Timboon Demons	8	0	10	0	899	1487	60.46%	32	Grand	Nirranda	10	11	71	Allansford	9	4	58
Kolora-Noorat	6	0	12	0	1153	1567	73.58%	24									
Panmure	4	0	14	0	931	1955	47.62%	16									
Dennington	4	0	14	0	844	1871	45.11%	16									
South Rovers	1	0	17	0	625	2526	24.74%	4									
