= List of places of worship in the City of Warrnambool =

This is a list of places of worship in the City of Warrnambool, a local government area in the state of Victoria, Australia. The list includes active and former churches and other religious buildings representing a variety of Christian denominations and other faiths.

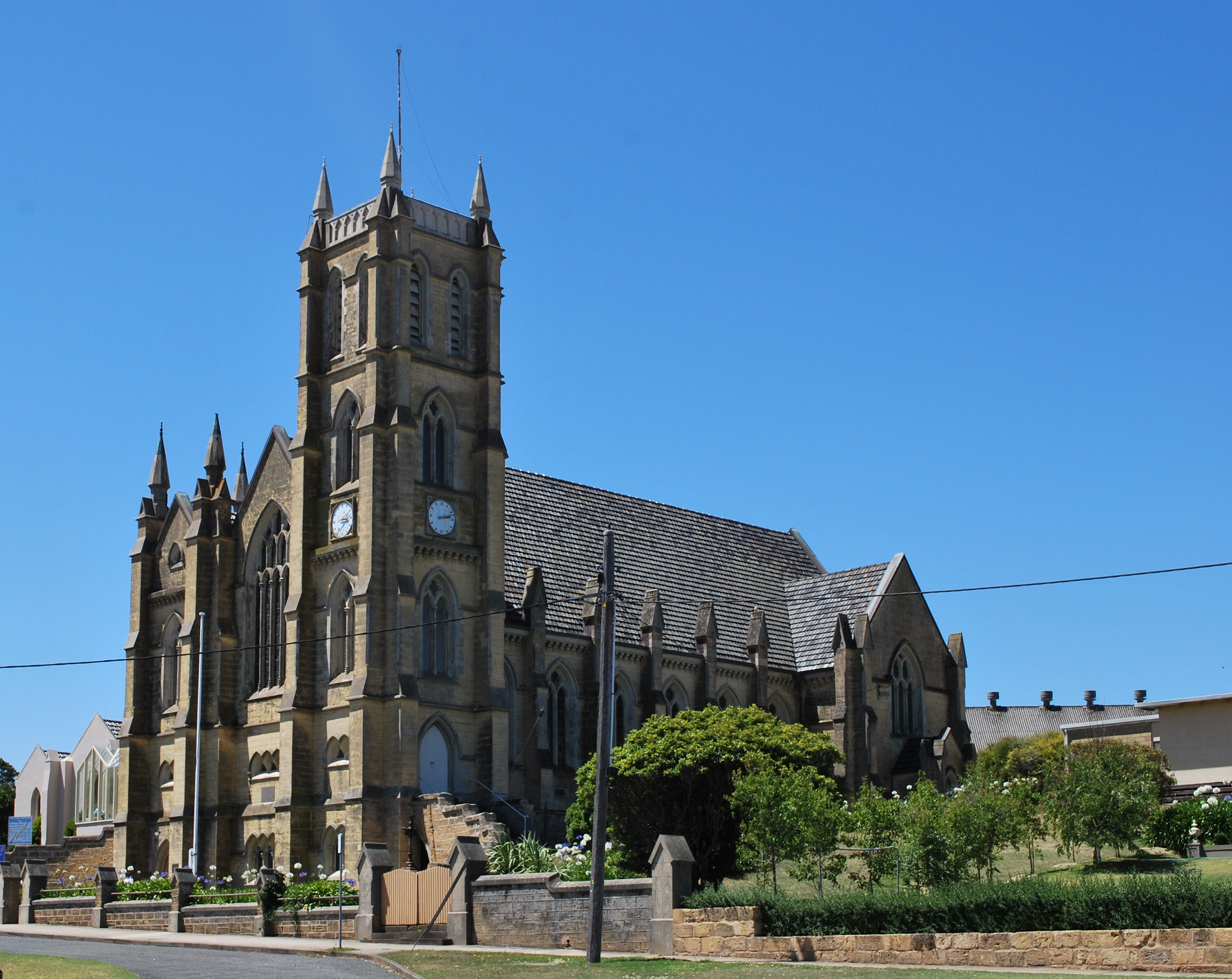
St John's Presbyterian Church, Warrnambool

== Heritage listing status ==
Style	Status
Yes	Listed on the Victorian Heritage Register
–	Not listed

== Current places of worship ==
Current places of worship
Name	Image	Location	Denomination/ Affiliation	Heritage listing	Notes	Refs
Warrnambool Uniting Church		Warrnambool; 38.384139°S 142.484159°E	Uniting (formerly Methodist)	–		
Christ Church, Warrnambool		Warrnambool; 38.380328°S 142.477421°E	Anglican	Yes		
St Joseph's Catholic Church, Warrnambool		Warrnambool; 38.380130°S 142.482146°E	Catholic	Yes		
Trinity Lutheran Church		Warrnambool; 38.380644°S 142.476364°E	Lutheran	–		
Warrnambool Baptist Church		Warrnambool; 38.382222°S 142.480051°E	Baptist	–		
St John's Presbyterian Church		Warrnambool; 38.377919°S 142.485022°E	Presbyterian	Yes		
New Life Christian Church		Warrnambool; 38.371177°S 142.481516°E	Pentecostal	–		
Warrnambool Revival Centre		Warrnambool; 38.372971°S 142.488307°E	Pentecostal	–		
St Nicholas' Seamen's Church		Warrnambool; 38.390094°S 142.484847°E	(Anglican)	–		
Warrnambool Seventh-day Adventist Church		Warrnambool; 38.382654°S 142.486085°E	Seventh-day Adventist	–		
St Carthage's Catholic Church		Allansford; 38.384956°S 142.608061°E	Catholic	–		
Allansford Uniting Church		Allansford; 38.386596°S 142.590676°E	Uniting (formerly Presbyterian)	–		
Warrnambool Russian Orthodox Church		Allansford; 38.386793°S 142.591848°E	Russian Orthodox	–		

== Former places of worship ==
Former places of worship
Name	Image	Location	Denomination/ Affiliation	Heritage listing	Notes	Refs
Warrnambool Church of Christ		Warrnambool; 38.378681°S 142.485189°E	Church of Christ	Yes		
St John's (St John the Baptist) Catholic Church, Dennington		Dennington; 38.358227°S 142.439993°E	Catholic	–		
St Andrew's Anglican Church, Dennington		Dennington; 38.356082°S 142.439915°E	Anglican	Yes		
Woodford Presbyterian Church		Woodford; 38.318733°S 142.480108°E	Presbyterian	–		
Woodford Catholic Church		Woodford; 38.319734°S 142.486668°E	Catholic	–		
Warrnambool Congregational Church		Warrnambool; 38.379288°S 142.478689°E	Congregational	Non-existent		

== See also ==
- List of places of worship in Golden Plains Shire
- List of places of worship in the City of Greater Geelong
