= McCrabb =

McCrabb is a surname. Notable people with the surname include:

- Austin McCrabb (born 1965), Australian rules footballer
- Les McCrabb (1914–2008), American baseball player
