= Bernie Harris =

Australian rules footballer

Personal information
- Full name: Bernard Harris
- Born: 25 August 1962 (age 64)
- Original team: Mortlake (HFL)
- Height: 175 cm (5 ft 9 in)
- Weight: 70 kg (154 lb)

Playing career^{1}
Years	Club	Games (Goals)
1984–1986	Fitzroy	46 (60)
1987–1990	Brisbane Bears	56 (58)
1990	St Kilda	5 (0)
Total		107 (118)
- ^{1} Playing statistics correct to the end of 1990.

Bernard Harris (born 25 August 1962) is a former Australian rules footballer who played with Fitzroy, the Brisbane Bears and St Kilda in the Victorian/Australian Football League (VFL/AFL).

Harris joined his elder brother Leon at Fitzroy in 1984, having previously played in Mortlake. A rover, he kicked more than 20 goals in a season on four occasions during his league career. He received three Brownlow Medal votes for his four goals and 26 disposals in a win over Sydney at the SCG in 1985 and participated in the 1986 finals series with Fitzroy.

In 1987 he was signed by Brisbane for their inaugural VFL season and had the distinction of kicking the club's first ever goal. Harris kicked six goals in a game against St Kilda that year. He left Brisbane halfway through the 1990 season and saw out the year at St Kilda after they picked him up in the Mid-Season draft.
