= Harold Maskell =

Australian rules footballer, born 1911

Personal information
- Full name: Harold Robert Maskell
- Born: 17 March 1911; Mortlake, Victoria
- Died: 12 September 1972 (aged 61); Heidelberg, Victoria
- Original team: Camperdown (HFL)
- Height: 178 cm (5 ft 10 in)
- Weight: 81 kg (179 lb)

Playing career^{1}
Years	Club	Games (Goals)
1932	Geelong	9 (0)
1934–35	Carlton	11 (2)
1935–36	Hawthorn	8 (2)
Total		28 (4)
- ^{1} Playing statistics correct to the end of 1936.

Harold Robert Maskell (17 March 1911 – 12 September 1972) was an Australian rules footballer who played with Geelong, Carlton and Hawthorn in the Victorian Football League (VFL).

When World War II began in 1939, Maskell volunteered for active service with the Australian Army. He qualified for the elite Commando force in 1942, and from then on fought against the invading Japanese Army in New Guinea and the neighbouring islands.
