= Len White (disambiguation) =

Len White (1930–1994) was an English professional footballer.

Len White may also refer to:

- Len White (Australian footballer) (1922–2010), Australia rules footballer
- Len White (trade unionist) (1897–1955), British trade union leader

== See also ==
- Leon White (disambiguation)
- Leonard White (disambiguation)
