= Bruce Murray =

Bruce Murray may refer to:

- Bruce C. Murray (1931–2013), American planetary scientist
- Bruce Murray (cricketer) (1940–2023), New Zealand cricketer
- Bruce Murray (footballer, born 1933) (1933–1981), Australian rules footballer for Geelong and St Kilda
- Bruce Murray (soccer) (born 1966), American soccer player
- Bruce Murray (sportscaster) (born 1963), American radio sportscaster
- Bruce Murray (sportsman) (1929–2020), Australian cricketer and footballer for South Melbourne
- Bruce Murray, 12th Duke of Atholl (born 1960), South African-born hereditary peer
