= Brian McKenzie =

Brian McKenzie may refer to:

- Brian McKenzie (ice hockey) (born 1951), retired Canadian ice hockey player
- Brian McKenzie (footballer) (born 1947), former Australian rules footballer

== See also ==
- Brian Mackenzie, Baron Mackenzie of Framwellgate (born 1943), British Labour member of the House of Lords
