= Coolahan =

Coolahan is an English surname. Notable people with the surname include:

- Bill Coolahan (fl. 1927–1943), Australian soccer player
- Craig Coolahan (born 1970), Canadian politician
- Jack Coolahan (1914–1988), Australian rules footballer
- James Aloysius Coolahan (1903–1986), United States district judge for the District of New Jersey
- Kate Coolahan (1929–2025), Australian-born New Zealand commercial artist, fashion illustrator, and printmaker
