= Alan Woodman =

Australian rules footballer

Personal information
- Full name: Alan Thomas Woodman
- Born: 7 June 1955
- Died: 8 May 2014 (aged 58); Geelong
- Original team: Bannockburn
- Height: 191 cm (6 ft 3 in)
- Weight: 92 kg (203 lb)

Playing career^{1}
Years	Club	Games (Goals)
1975–1979	Geelong	58 (2)
- ^{1} Playing statistics correct to the end of 1979.

Alan Thomas Woodman (7 June 1955 – 8 May 2014) was an Australian rules footballer who played with Geelong in the Victorian Football League (VFL).

Woodman was a defender from Bannockburn who played mostly as a centre half-back and in the back pocket. He had one of his best games in Geelong's semi final against North Melbourne in 1976, with 23 disposals, but finished on the losing team. In 1978 he appeared in 21 games, the most he would play in a single season.

In 1982 and 1983, Woodman won the Hampden Football League's Maskell Medal, while playing with Camperdown. He was the first player to win the award back to back since George Swarbrick in the 1950s, another Geelong footballer. Alan also played locally with Grovedale, St Albans, Barwon and Winchelsea; however Alan is held in high regard with the Bannockburn Tigers named as their Captain in the Team of the Century (Alan guided the Tigers to their first flag in over 50 years in 1990). Alan promised the club that he would return someday after he was picked up by the Cats (VFL/AFL). Alan was one of Geelong's toughest footballers who was hard on his players and himself; he once played out a game with a broken jaw whilst at Grovedale and had his jaw wired up at hospital after playing out the remainder of the match. He died aged 58 on 8 May 2014.
