= Peter Linke =

Australian rules footballer

Personal information
- Full name: Peter Michael Linke
- Born: 13 March 1949 (age 77)
- Original team: Port Fairy

Playing career^{1}
Years	Club	Games (Goals)
1970 — 1971	Geelong	10 (0)
- ^{1} Playing statistics correct to the end of 1971.

Peter Michael Linke (born March 13, 1949) is a former Australian rules footballer who played for Geelong in the Victorian Football League (now known as the Australian Football League). His brother, Graeme, also played for Geelong.
