= Dan Harrington (footballer) =

Australian rules footballer

Personal information
- Full name: Dan Harrington
- Born: 7 February 1953 (age 73)
- Original team: Coragulac
- Height: 188 cm (6 ft 2 in)
- Weight: 92 kg (203 lb)

Playing career^{1}
Years	Club	Games (Goals)
1974–1976	Fitzroy	7 (0)
- ^{1} Playing statistics correct to the end of 1976.

Dan Harrington (born 7 February 1953) is a former Australian rules footballer who played with Fitzroy in the Victorian Football League (VFL).

Harrington was recruited from Coragulac, with whom he won the 1973 Maskell Medal, awarded to the best and fairest player in the Hampden Football League.

He played three games for Fitzroy in the 1974 VFL season, didn't play a senior game in 1975, but made a further four appearances in 1976. He then moved to South Australia where he played successfully with West Adelaide and Central Districts.
