= Leon White =

Leon White may refer to:

- Big Van Vader (1955–2018), American professional wrestler who was also an American football offensive lineman
- Leon White (linebacker) (born 1963), American football defensive player
- Leon White (musician) (born 1950), American musician

== See also ==
- Len White (disambiguation)
- Leonard White (disambiguation)
