= City of Warrnambool =

Coordinates: 38°28′00″S 142°28′00″E

- Local government area
- Location in Victoria

- Interactive map of City of Warrnambool
- Country: Australia
- State: Victoria
- Region: Barwon South West
- Established: 1855
- Council seat: Warrnambool

Government
  - Mayor: Ben Blain
  - State electorate: South-West Coast
  - Federal division: Wannon

Area
  - Total: 121 km^{2} (47 sq mi)

Population
  - Total: 35,000 (2023)
  - Density: 289/km^{2} (749/sq mi)
- Gazetted: 23 September 1994
- Website: City of Warrnambool
LGAs around City of Warrnambool
Moyne	Moyne	Moyne
Moyne	City of Warrnambool	Moyne
Southern Ocean	Southern Ocean	Southern Ocean

The City of Warrnambool is a local government area in the Barwon South West region of Victoria, Australia, located in the south-western part of the state. It covers an area of 121 square kilometres (47 mi^{2}) and in June 2018 had a population of 34,862. It is entirely surrounded by the Shire of Moyne and the Southern Ocean. It is one of only a few regional councils in Victoria to remain serving just one urban district after the amalgamation process of 1994, although through that process it did gain some portions of the former Shire of Warrnambool.

The city is governed and administered by the Warrnambool City Council; its seat of local government and administrative centre is located at the council headquarters in the central district of Warrnambool. The city is named after the main urban settlement located in the centre of the LGA, that is Warrnambool, which is also the LGA's most populous urban centre with a population of 28,413.

== History ==
Warrnambool was first incorporated as a municipality on 7 December 1855. It became a borough on 1 October 1863, and a town on 2 February 1883. It was proclaimed as a city on 8 April 1918. On 25 October 1955 and 1 October 1978, it annexed part of the south riding of the Shire of Warrnambool, expanding its area progressively to 34.43 square kilometres (13.29 sq mi) by the time of Victoria's local government amalgamations.

In 1993, the new Kennett Liberal government announced a program of local government reform, in which many of Victoria's 210 councils were to be amalgamated. The southwest region containing 23 councils was the first to be reviewed, and the City of Warrnambool sought to be part of the process early on. Warrnambool's strength in tertiary education and manufacturing was taken into account. By June, it was clear that Warrnambool would be the only municipality in the region to be spared, and that it would gain Allansford and some other rural areas from the Shire of Warrnambool. On 23 September 1994, the council was dismissed and replaced with a Government-appointed commissioner. It first held elections for a new council in March 1996.

The City of Warrnambool before (green) and after (brown) the 1994 reform

== Council ==
2024 ward boundaries. Expand the map and click on a ward to see the ward name.

=== Current composition ===
The council is composed of seven wards and seven councillors, with one councillor elected to represent each ward.

The most recent council election was declared on 12 November 2024, with the Councillors sworn into office on 25 November 2024. At their first meeting, Councillors resolved to elect both a Mayor and Deputy Mayor, each for a term of 12 months.

Ward	Councillor	Notes
Botanic	Billy Edis	
Central	Debbie Arnott	
Hopkins River	Willy Benter	
Pertobe	Matt Walsh	Deputy Mayor
Platypus	Vicki Jellie	
Russells Creek	Ben Blain	Mayor
Wollaston	Richard Ziegeler	

==== Former wards ====
Prior to the statewide amalgamations of the 1990s, the council had four wards and twelve councillors, with three councillors per ward elected to represent each ward; the former wards were Albert, Hopkins, Merri and Victoria. The new council then had, until 2004, seven wards and seven councillors, with one councillor per ward elected to represent each ward. However post-2004, following an electoral representation review, the decision was made to keep the seven councillors, but abolish the wards, as the review concluded that the geography and natural features of Warrnambool didn't support the retention of equal wards, and that the City of Warrnambool as a whole was a single community of interest.

Former wards from 1996 to 2004:

- Botanic Ward
- Cassady Ward
- Levy Ward
- Pertobe Ward
- Proudfoot Ward
- Sherwood Ward
- Wollaston Ward

=== Administration and governance ===
The council meets in the council chambers at the council headquarters in the Warrnambool Civic Centre, which is also the location of the council's administrative activities. It also provides customer services at its administrative centre in Warrnambool.

== Geography ==
The city of Warrnambool is dominated by the Warrnambool urban area, which represents 35.0 square kilometres (13.5 sq mi), or 29.0%, of the city's area and at the 2006 census had a population of 28,150.

== Townships and localities ==
The 2021 census, the city had a population of 35,406 up from 33,655 in the 2016 census

Population
Locality	2016	2021
Allansford^	1,521	1,410
Bushfield^	571	596
Dennington^	1,907	1,994
Illowa^	304	304
Warrnambool^	29,661	31,308
Woodford^	361	436
Yangery^	111	113

^ – Territory divided with another LGA

== See also ==
- Warrnambool
- List of localities in Victoria
- List of places of worship in the City of Warrnambool
