= North Warrnambool Football Club =

Australia rules football and netball club

North Warrnambool Eagles Football Netball Club

Names
- Full name: North Warrnambool Eagles Football Netball Club
- Nickname: Eagles

Club details
- Founded: 1986; 40 years ago
- Colours
- Competition: Hampden FNL
- Premierships: (6) 1960, 1968, 1972, 1977, 1994, 2025 (Note: As "Northern Districts FC" in the Warrnambool District Football League)
- Ground: Bushfield Recreation Reserve, Bushfield

Uniforms
Home

The North Warrnambool Eagles Football Netball Club, nicknamed the Eagles, is an Australian rules football and netball club based near the regional city of Warrnambool, Victoria. The club teams currently compete in the Hampden Football Netball League, where the football squad has played since 1997.

== History ==
The club was formed in 1986 with the merger of Grassmere and Bushfield clubs. The merged club was known as Northern Districts and competed in the Warrnambool District Football League until it transferred to the stronger Hampden league in 1997. Northern Districts won the 1994 premiership in the Warrnambool DFL and was runners-up in 1992.

A move to the Hampden Football Netball League and a name change to North Warrnambool, the Eagles struggled for their first season, finishing last. Michael Kol was the first coach. The Eagles played in their first finals campaign since joining in 2011 in an Elimination Final against Terang Mortlake Football Club going down by only 2 points.

In 2012 the Eagles stock rose significantly finishing 3rd on the ladder overall and losing the Preliminary Final against Cobden Football Club by 52 points. Eagles proceeded to make grand final in 2016, 2019, 2022, 2023, 2024 All losing to Koroit apart from 2023 and 2024 losing to South Warrnambool. 4 out of 5 of the Grand finals were in a row because of Covid cancelling 2020 and cancelling 2021 finals series.

North Warrnambool finally broke through for a maiden premiership win in 2025 defeating the Koroit Saints. Jackson Grundy (Ron Hoy Medal) and Nathan Vardy (AFL Victoria Medal) were named best on ground.

== Notable players ==
- David Haynes - West Coast Eagles Coach of North Warrnambool Eagles 2011 - Current
- Billie Smedts - Geelong
- Josh Corbett - Gold Coast, Fremantle
- Nathan Vardy - Geelong, West Coast Eagles, Senior Coach of North Warrrnambool since 2024
