= Luke Vogels =

Australian rules footballer

Personal information
- Born: 7 June 1983 (age 43)
- Original teams: Geelong Falcons (TAC Cup)/ Terang Mortlake (Hampden FL)
- Debut: Round 7, 7 May 2005, Sydney Swans vs. Essendon, at Stadium Australia
- Height: 194 cm (6 ft 4 in)
- Weight: 92 kg (203 lb)

Playing career^{1}
Years	Club	Games (Goals)
2005–2007	Sydney Swans	17 (11)
- ^{1} Playing statistics correct to the end of 2007.

Luke Vogels (born 7 June 1983) is a former Australian rules footballer in the Australian Football League.

Vogels played for the Geelong Falcons in the TAC Cup junior competition, but was overlooked in the AFL draft. In 2004 he played as a member of the Terang Mortlake Football Club winning the Maskel Medal and also the Premiership that same year.

He was elevated from the Sydney Swans rookie list in 2005 and made his debut in Round 7 later that year against Essendon. He was delisted by Sydney at the end of the 2007 season.
