= Yangery =

- Suburb
- Interactive map of Yangery
- Coordinates: 38°18′51″S 142°25′44″E
- Country: Australia
- State: Victoria
- City: Warrnambool
- LGA: City of Warrnambool

Government
  - State electorate: South-West Coast
  - Federal division: Wannon

Population
  - Total: 111 (2016 census)
- Postcode: 3283

Yangery is a small town located in the Western District, in Victoria, Australia. In the 2016 census, Yangery had a population of 111.
