= Jack Coolahan =

Australian rules footballer, born 1914

Personal information
- Full name: Jack Coolahan
- Born: 22 August 1914
- Died: 22 April 1988 (aged 73)
- Original team: Mortlake
- Height: 180 cm (5 ft 11 in)
- Weight: 84 kg (185 lb)

Playing career^{1}
Years	Club	Games (Goals)
1937	Melbourne	2 (1)
1938–39	Footscray	12 (12)
Total		14 (13)
- ^{1} Playing statistics correct to the end of 1939.

Jack Coolahan (22 August 1914 – 22 April 1988) was an Australian rules footballer who played with Melbourne and Footscray in the Victorian Football League (VFL). He returned to his original club Mortlake in 1940, as coach.
