= Dick Wearmouth =

Australian rules footballer

Personal information
- Full name: Richard Wearmouth
- Born: 12 May 1926; Rupanyup, Victoria
- Died: 5 April 2012 (aged 85); Terang, Victoria
- Original team: Rupanyup
- Height: 173 cm (5 ft 8 in)
- Weight: 75 kg (165 lb)
- Position: Wing

Playing career^{1}
Years	Club	Games (Goals)
1944–1952	Footscray	100 (27)
- ^{1} Playing statistics correct to the end of 1952.

Richard Wearmouth (12 May 1926 – 5 April 2012) was an Australian rules footballer who played with Footscray in the Victorian Football League (VFL).

The start of Wearmouth's career coincided with World War II and the Rupanyup recruit didn't play senior football in 1945 because of his commitments with the Royal Australian Air Force. He had been the Gardiner Medal winner in the 1944 VFL seconds season.

From 1946 to 1952, he was a regular fixture in the Footscray side, usually on a wing. He polled well in the 1951 Brownlow Medal count, finishing second to Charlie Sutton out of the Footscray players and equal 12th overall.

He became captain-coach of Terang, after leaving Footscray.

His son, Ronnie Wearmouth, played for Collingwood.
