= Graeme Reichman =

Australian rules footballer

Personal information
- Full name: Graeme Reichman
- Born: 4 November 1951
- Died: 11 November 2001 (aged 50); Warrnambool
- Original team: Mortlake
- Height: 183 cm (6 ft 0 in)
- Weight: 80 kg (176 lb)

Playing career^{1}
Years	Club	Games (Goals)
1973	Collingwood	11 (4)
- ^{1} Playing statistics correct to the end of 1973.

Graeme Reichman (4 November 1951 – 11 November 2001) was an Australian rules footballer who played with Collingwood in the Victorian Football League (VFL).

After winning a Maskell Medal with Mortlake as the 'best and fairest' player in the 1971 Hampden Football League season, Reichman was signed up by Collingwood and played VFL reserves in 1972.

== VFL career ==
He made his senior debut in the 1973 season and appeared in the first ten games of the year, as a 21-year-old. Only once did he finish in a losing side and Collingwood went on to claim the minor premiership, however Reichman missed the latter half of the season through injury and returned to Mortlake.

== Country football ==
Reichman won another Maskell Medal in 1976 and in the early 1980s played with the Hamilton Imperials in the Western Border Football League. He was a member of Hamilton's 1980 premiership team and won the league's 'best and fairest' award in 1982.

Reichman was still playing football while he was into his late forties. He was a football nomad that played for various clubs within the Western district of Victoria.

== Death ==
In 2001, a week after his 50th birthday, he committed suicide at his home in West Warrnambool. The body of his 25 year old wife was found in the house, and firearms were retrieved by police.

Graeme's young wife was the victim of years of abuse by the hand of the ex-Collingwood winger.

He killed her before turning the gun on himself.
