= Kerrin Hayes =

Australian rules footballer

Personal information
- Full name: Kerrin Hayes
- Born: 9 September 1951 (age 75)
- Original team: Port Fairy
- Height: 180 cm (5 ft 11 in)
- Weight: 73 kg (161 lb)

Playing career^{1}
Years	Club	Games (Goals)
1974–1975	Fitzroy	8 (5)
- ^{1} Playing statistics correct to the end of 1975.

Kerrin Hayes is a former Australian rules footballer, who played for the Fitzroy Football Club in the Victorian Football League (VFL).
