= Leo White (disambiguation) =

Leo White may refer to:

- Leo White (1873-1948), German-born British-American film and stage actor
- Leo White (judoka) (born 1957), American judoka
- Leo Lemuel White (1906–1967), New Zealand photographer

== See also ==
- Leonard White, multiple people
