= John Lewis (footballer, born 1953) =

Australian rules footballer (1953–2024)

Personal information
- Full name: John Fellowes Lewis
- Born: 22 May 1953
- Died: 8 September 2024 (aged 71)
- Original team: Warrnambool
- Height: 196 cm (6 ft 5 in)
- Weight: 96 kg (212 lb)

Playing career
Years	Club	Games (Goals)
1975	Fitzroy	10 (5)

John Fellowes Lewis (22 May 1953 – 8 September 2024) was an Australian rules footballer, who played for the Fitzroy Football Club in the Victorian Football League (VFL). He later played with Geelong West in the Victorian Football Association (VFA).
