= Les Begley =

Australian rules footballer

Personal information
- Full name: Leslie Hamilton Begley
- Born: 14 October 1916; Warrnambool, Victoria
- Died: 24 August 1994 (aged 77)
- Original team: Warrnambool
- Height: 183 cm (6 ft 0 in)
- Weight: 80 kg (176 lb)
- Position: Centre

Playing career^{1}
Years	Club	Games (Goals)
1938–41	Essendon	50 (32)
- ^{1} Playing statistics correct to the end of 1941.

Leslie Hamilton Begley (14 October 1916 – 24 August 1994) was a former Australian rules footballer who played with Essendon in the Victorian Football League (VFL).
