= Noel Mugavin =

Australian rules footballer

Personal information
- Born: 28 June 1956 (age 70); Koroit, Victoria
- Original team: Port Fairy (HFL)
- Height: 188 cm (6 ft 2 in)
- Weight: 86 kg (190 lb)

Playing career^{1}
Years	Club	Games (Goals)
1978–1981	Fitzroy	41 (22)
1982	Richmond	2 (3)
Total		43 (25)
- ^{1} Playing statistics correct to the end of 1982.

Noel Mugavin (born 28 June 1956) is a former Australian rules footballer who played with Fitzroy and Richmond in the Victorian Football League (VFL).

Mugavin was born in Warrnambool, and starred as a junior, catching the eyes of VFL scouts at an early age. His flowing locks became a trademark throughout his career.

Mugavin's career was cut short when he suffered a spleen injury in 1982, prompting him to retire from the highest level. Mugavin returned to the Hampden Football League in a coaching role.

He currently coaches players at South Warrnambool Football Club, and teaches students at Emmanuel College Warrnambool. He is also currently involved with greyhound racing.

His nephew is Brisbane Lions centre half forward Jonathan Brown and his youngest son Jamie, plies his trade at an amateur level in Melbourne.
