= Harry Herbert =

Australian rules footballer

Personal information
- Full name: Harry Herbert
- Born: 2 August 1934
- Died: 19 January 2011 (aged 76)
- Original team: Warrnambool
- Height: 185 cm (6 ft 1 in)
- Weight: 84 kg (185 lb)

Playing career^{1}
Years	Club	Games (Goals)
1952–1957	Geelong	56 (27)
- ^{1} Playing statistics correct to the end of 1957.

Harry Herbert (2 August 1934 – 19 January 2011) was an Australian rules footballer for the Geelong Football Club and a Victorian policeman.

Born in Warrnambool, he played in the Geelong team that holds the VFL/AFL record for the longest run of winning games in succession (26 matches). He also played cricket and was once rated by the famous English cricketer, Sir Leonard Hutton, who was on tour in Australia, as Australia's fastest bowler.
