= Leonard White =

Leonard White may refer to:

- Leonard White (Massachusetts politician) (1767–1849), United States representative from Massachusetts
- Leonard White (Illinois politician), member of the Illinois Senate from 1820 to 1824
- Leonard White (physician) (1856–1906), American physician
- Leonard White (producer) (1916–2016), British actor and producer
- Leonard White (basketball) (born 1971), American professional basketball player
- Leonard D. White (1891–1958), historian of public administration in the United States
- Lenny White (Leonard White III), musician, bandleader, producer, professor

== See also ==
- Len White (disambiguation)
- Leo White (disambiguation)
- Leon White (disambiguation)
