= Illowa =

- Suburb
- Interactive map of Illowa
- Coordinates: 38°19′48″S 142°24′21″E
- Country: Australia
- State: Victoria
- City: Warrnambool
- LGA: City of Warrnambool

Government
  - State electorate: South-West Coast
  - Federal division: Wannon

Population
  - Total: 304 (2016 census)
- Postcode: 3282

Illowa is a locality located in the Western District, in Victoria, Australia. In the 2016 census, Illowa had a population of 304.
