= Nick Hider =

Australian rules footballer

Personal information
- Full name: Nicholas Hider
- Born: 31 August 1971 (age 55)
- Original team: Camperdown
- Draft: 24th, 1995 Pre-Season Draft
- Height: 174 cm (5 ft 9 in)
- Weight: 72 kg (159 lb)

Playing career^{1}
Years	Club	Games (Goals)
1995	Collingwood	2 (1)
- ^{1} Playing statistics correct to the end of 1995.

Nicholas Hider (born 31 August 1971) is a former Australian rules footballer who played for the Collingwood Football Club in the Australian Football League (AFL).

Hider came to Collingwood from Camperdown, through the 1995 Pre-Season Draft. He appeared in the opening two rounds of the 1995 AFL season but didn't play any more senior games.

He won his second Maskell Medal in 2003 while with Warrnambool, having also won the Hampden Football League "Best and Fairest" award back in 1994, for Camperdown.

In 2007, at the age of 36, he played with Maffra and won the West Gippsland Latrobe Football League's top award, the Trood Award-Rodda Medal.

Since 2009 he has been the coach of the Sale City Football Club that plays in the North Gippsland Football League.
