= Ian Payne (footballer) =

Australian rules footballer

Personal information
- Full name: Ian Graham Payne
- Nickname: Porky
- Born: 22 March 1947; Coleraine, Victoria
- Original team: Terang
- Height: 175 cm (5 ft 9 in)
- Weight: 76 kg (168 lb)
- Positions: Centre, half-forward

Playing career^{1}
Years	Club	Games (Goals)
1965–67, 1969–71	Essendon	45 (11)
1972–73	Sunshine (VFA)	
- ^{1} Playing statistics correct to the end of 1973.

Ian Graham Payne (born 22 March 1947) is a former Australian rules footballer who played with Essendon in the Victorian Football League (VFL).

Payne won the reserves best and fairest in 1965. Payne missed the 1968 season and the first half of the 1969 because he was conscripted to fight in the Vietnam War. He later played for Sunshine and Keilor.

Payne's brother, Charlie Payne, also played for Essendon.
