= Austin McCrabb =

Australian rules footballer

Personal information
- Full name: Austin McCrabb
- Born: 27 January 1965 (age 61)
- Original team: Colac (HFL)
- Height: 186 cm (6 ft 1 in)
- Weight: 92 kg (203 lb)

Playing career^{1}
Years	Club	Games (Goals)
1987–1991	Geelong	36 (4)
1992	Hawthorn	9 (1)
Total		45 (5)
- ^{1} Playing statistics correct to the end of 1992.

Austin McCrabb (born 27 January 1965) is a former Australian rules footballer who played with Geelong and Hawthorn in the Victoria/Australian Football League (VFL/AFL).

McCrabb, a defender, played under 19s football for Fitzroy but it was from Hampden Football League (HFL) club Colac that he was recruited to Geelong. He only came close to playing a full season once, when he made 15 appearances in the 1990 AFL season.

Following the end of his AFL career, McCrabb switched to Victorian Football Association (VFA) club Sandringham, playing in their 1994 premiership side.

== Sources ==
- Fiddian, M. (2016) The VFA: A history of the Victorian Football Association 1877 - 1995, Melbourne Sports Books: Melbourne.
