= Josh Corbett =

Australian rules footballer (born 1996)

Personal information
- Full name: Josh Corbett
- Nickname: Corbo
- Born: 23 April 1996 (age 30)
- Original team: Werribee (VFL)
- Draft: 2018 Special Assistance Signing
- Height: 190 cm (6 ft 3 in)
- Weight: 90 kg (198 lb)
- Position: Forward

Playing career^{1}
Years	Club	Games (Goals)
2019–2022	Gold Coast	36 (33)
2023–2024	Fremantle	5 (3)
Total		41 (36)
- ^{1} Playing statistics correct to the end of 2024.

Career highlights
- 2x Fremantle Best Clubman: 2023, 2024; Fothergill–Round–Mitchell Medal: 2018

Josh Corbett (born 23 April 1996) is a former professional Australian rules footballer who played for the Gold Coast Suns and the Fremantle Football Club in the Australian Football League (AFL).

== Early life ==
Corbett was raised in the regional Victorian town of Warrnambool and grew up playing football for the North Warrnambool Eagles in the Hampden Football League. As a teenager, he was overlooked by his region's TAC Cup team North Ballarat but continued to make his way through the local levels of football in Warrnambool. After finishing second in North Warrnambool's 2015 senior best and fairest award at the age of 19, Corbett was invited to take part in preseason training with the Werribee Tigers and impressed enough to be signed prior to the commencement of the 2016 VFL season. He gradually adjusted to the higher standard of competition by improving his fitness and made his senior VFL debut for Werribee in August 2016. By early 2018, Corbett had cemented his place in Werribee's forward line and strung together nine consecutive games in which he kicked 22 goals. He also led the VFL in contested marks and marks inside 50. His outstanding start to the season came to a halt in round 12 when an errant poke to his left eye from a Frankston opponent obstructed his vision and resulted in a blood clot forming in his iris and pupil. He went temporarily blind in his left eye for a month due to the incident and was unable to return for the rest of the 2018 season. Despite only playing half a season, Corbett was awarded the Fothergill–Round–Mitchell Medal as the VFL's most promising young player. During his time with Werribee, he was personally sponsored by former Australian Prime Minister Julia Gillard.

In October 2018, the Gold Coast Suns signed Corbett to a four-year AFL contract with the use of the special assistance state league priority access granted by the AFL.

== AFL career ==
Corbett made his AFL debut for Gold Coast against the Brisbane Lions in round 6 of the 2019 AFL season, and kicked two goals in his first game.

Following the conclusion of the 2022 AFL season, Corbett was traded to Fremantle in exchange for a future fourth round pick. Corbett kicked two goals during round 20 of the 2023 AFL season in Fremantle's 7 point win over Geelong at Kardinia Park. Corbett suffered a hip injury in late October 2023 which required surgery, and as a result missed the entirety of the 2024 AFL season. At the end of that season, Corbett announced his retirement at the age of 28, then signing for an off-field role with Fremantle's Fans & Community department.

== Statistics ==
Statistics are correct to the end of 2023

Legend
G	Goals	K	Kicks	D	Disposals	T	Tackles
B	Behinds	H	Handballs	M	Marks

Season	Team	No.	Games	Totals							Averages (per game)							Votes
Season	Team	No.	Games	G	B	K	H	D	M	T	G	B	K	H	D	M	T	Votes
2019	Gold Coast	19	9	3	8	50	31	81	40	14	0.3	0.9	5.6	3.4	9.0	4.4	1.6	0
2020 (Note: The 2020 season was played with 17 home-and-away matches per team (down from 22) and 16-minute quarters with time on (down from 20-minute quarters with time on) due to the impact of the COVID-19 pandemic.)	Gold Coast	19	7	3	6	45	17	62	31	7	0.4	0.9	6.4	2.4	8.9	4.4	1.0	0
2021	Gold Coast	19	16	23	11	101	41	142	78	12	1.4	0.7	6.3	2.6	8.9	4.9	0.8	1
2022	Gold Coast	19	4	4	1	12	12	24	12	2	1.0	0.3	3.0	3.0	6.0	3.0	0.5	0
2023	Fremantle	19	5	3	3	23	10	33	20	2	0.6	0.6	4.6	2.0	6.6	4.0	0.4	
Career			41	36	29	231	111	342	181	37	0.9	0.7	5.6	2.7	8.3	4.4	0.9	1
