= David Haynes =

Australian rules footballer

Personal information
- Full name: David Haynes
- Born: 10 June 1981 (age 45)
- Original team: Geelong Falcons
- Draft: 16th, 1999 AFL draft
- Height: 189 cm (6 ft 2 in)
- Weight: 94 kg (207 lb)

Playing career^{1}
Years	Club	Games (Goals)
2000–2003	West Coast	46 (43)
2004–2005	Geelong	19 (15)
Total		65 (58)
- ^{1} Playing statistics correct to the end of 2005.

David Haynes (born 10 June 1981) is a former Australian rules footballer who played with the West Coast Eagles and Geelong in the Australian Football League (AFL), and East Perth in the West Australian Football League (WAFL).

Originally from North Warrnambool Football Club in the Hampden Football League, Haynes played for junior club Geelong Falcons before being drafted by West Coast with the 16th selection of the 1999 AFL draft, which the Eagles had secured from Fremantle in exchange for Brendon Fewster.

Haynes made his senior AFL debut in 2000 but spent most of his first two seasons in the WAFL with East Perth, where he was a member of their 2001 premiership team. A half forward flanker, he kicked 27 goals from 21 appearances for West Coast in 2003.

At the 2003 AFL draft, Haynes was traded to Geelong, for the 20th draft pick with which West Coast drafted Sam Butler. In 2004 Haynes played 16 games, three of them in the finals series, but was delisted after registering just three appearances the following season.

Haynes is a cousin of Australian international cricketer Rachael Haynes.
