= Len White (Australian footballer) =

Australian rules footballer (1922–2010)

Personal information
- Full name: Leonard Joseph White
- Born: 26 August 1922; Camperdown, Victoria
- Died: 29 August 2010 (aged 88); Camperdown, Victoria
- Original team: Camperdown
- Height: 180 cm (5 ft 11 in)
- Weight: 80 kg (176 lb)
- Position: Half back

Playing career^{1}
Years	Club	Games (Goals)
1947–1948	Geelong	32 (0)
- ^{1} Playing statistics correct to the end of 1948.

Career highlights
- Geelong "best first year player": 1947; Camperdown best and fairest: 1946, 1949–51; Camperdown premiership coach: 1951

Leonard Joseph White (26 August 1922 – 29 August 2010) was an Australian rules footballer who played with Geelong in the Victorian Football League (VFL).

== Early career ==
Born in Camperdown, White was one of eleven born to Eugene and Ellen White (née Nolan). White started his senior career at the Camperdown Football Club, in the Hampden Football League. One of four brothers in the Camperdown team, White won the club's best and fairest award in 1946, as a full-back.

== Geelong ==
White was used mostly as a half back by Geelong, which he joined in 1947.

In his debut season he made 17 appearances and was described by Jim Blake of the Sporting Globe as one of the "best recruits" that season. At the end of the season he won Geelong's award for the "best first year player". It was noted in The Argus that there was confusion at the Brownlow Medal count that year when a vote was awarded to "White, Geelong", which could also have been for his teammate Lindsay White.

He played 15 league games in 1948, his second and final season in the VFL.

== Coach of Camperdown ==
White returned to Camperdown in 1949 as the new coach. He went on to coach Camperdown to a premiership in 1951, secured with a 31-point grand final win over Cobden. His on field performances that season won him a third successive club best and fairest.

Although he retired in 1952, White came back as coach the following year, when his replacement Bob Kelsey was unable to get a clearance from Port Melbourne. In the opening round of the 1953 season, White suffered a broken leg, which would keep him out for the rest of the year, so he stood aside as coach, allowing the club to recruit former Carlton premiership player Ritchie Green. During the 1953 season, a seventh White brother joined Camperdown.
