= Warrnambool Football Club =

Warrnambool

Names
- Full name: Warrnambool Football Netball Club Inc
- Nickname: Blues

Club details
- Founded: 1861; 165 years ago
- Colours
- Competition: Hampden FNL
- Premierships: (25): 1935, 1937, 1939, 1946, 1947, 1957, 1959, 1960, 1962, 1963, 1966, 1976, 1977, 1978, 1984, 1986, 1987, 1988, 1989, 1992, 2001, 2002, 2010, 2012, 2013
- Ground: Reid Oval

Uniforms
Home

Other information
- Official website: warrnamboolfc.com.au

The Warrnambool Football Netball Club, nicknamed the Blues, is an Australian rules football and netball club based in the city of the same name. Warrnambool teams compete in the Hampden Football Netball League, where the football squad has played since 1933.

== History ==
The origins of the clubs can be traced back to 1861, when a "football" (Note: The source indicates "English football", which could refer to both, association football (which sounds improbable due to the game was ruled in 1863) or rugby football, more similar to Australian football and played since about 1845 in England) match was played in Warrnambool. The club was formed shortly after, being one of the oldest football clubs in Australia.

In 1913 the club won its first premiership, playing in the Western District Football Association. Warrnambool entered into recess in 1915 due to World War I, returning to action in 1920 under the named "Warrnambool City". In 1924, the club merged with South Warrnambool to form "Warrnambool FC", winning flags in 1924 and 1927. Nevertheless, the club divided again in 1928, with Warrnambool City reverting to its original name.

The Blues switched to the Hampden Football League, where the club achieved a large success, winning no less than one premiership per decade. Warrnambool also claimed a hat trick of flags, accomplishing that honor twice.

== Football Premierships ==
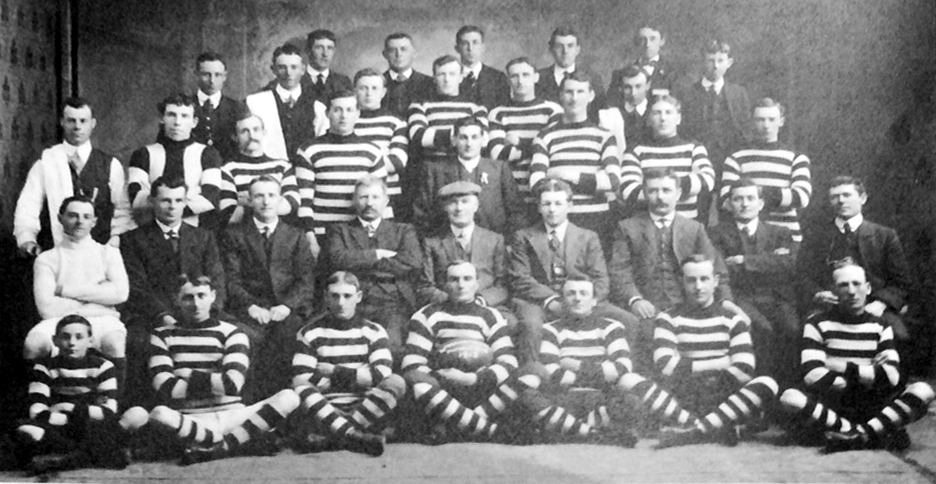
Warrnambool team of 1912

Seniors

- Western District Football Association (2)
  - 1913, 1914
- Warrnambool District and Corangamite Football Association (1)
  - 1924
- Western District Football League (2)
  - 1927, 1931
- Hampden Football League (25):
  - 1935, 1937, 1939, 1946, 1947, 1957, 1959, 1960, 1962, 1963, 1966, 1976, 1977, 1978, 1984, 1986, 1987, 1988, 1989, 1992, 2001, 2002, 2010, 2012, 2013

Reserves

- Hampden Football League
  - 1977,

Thirds

- Hampden Football League
  - 1966,

== Football League - Best & Fairest Winners ==
Seniors

Hampden Football League - Maskell Medallists

- 1951 - Don Grossman
- 1953 - John O'Neill
- 1962 - Bill McConnell
- 1977 - Tony Hills
- 1993 - Chris Grumley
- 2000 - Paul Jenkinson
- 2003 - Nick Hider
- 2009 - Josh Walters
- 2011 - Rhys Raymond
- 2012 - Tim Hunt

Reserves

== VFL / AFL Players ==
The following footballers played with Warrnambool FC prior to their senior VFL / AFL football debut.

- 1897 - Ned Officer - Essendon
- 1902 - Alec McKenzie - Geelong
- 1912 - Percy Martyn - St. Kilda
- 1919 - George Threlfall - Richmond
- 1920 - Billy Sarll - St. Kilda
- 1921 - Laurie Murphy - Collingwood
- 1928 - Len McConnell - North Melbourne
- 1934 - Dick Harris Richmond
- 1936 - Nick Muller - Geelong
- 1938 - Les Begley - Essendon
- 1943 - Bill Brittingham Essendon
- 1947 - Harry Somerville - North Melbourne
- 1951 - Ron Walker - South Melbourne
- 1952 - Harry Herbert - Geelong
- 1953 - Gerry McDonald - South Melbourne
- 1955 - Geoff Umbers - Geelong
- 1967 - Robert Hando - South Melbourne
- 1974 - Neville Taylor - Fitzroy
- 1974 - Michael Turner Geelong
- 1975 - John Lewis - Fitzroy
- 1985 - Paul Couch Geelong
- 2005 - Jordan Lewis Hawthorn
- 2007 - Simon Hogan - Geelong
