= George Swarbrick (footballer) =

Australian rules footballer

Personal information
- Full name: George Lionel Swarbrick
- Born: 11 December 1930
- Died: 12 December 2016 (aged 86); Warrnambool, Victoria
- Original team: Hawkesdale
- Height: 193 cm (6 ft 4 in)
- Weight: 89 kg (196 lb)

Playing career^{1}
Years	Club	Games (Goals)
1952–53	Geelong	23 (8)
- ^{1} Playing statistics correct to the end of 1953.

George Lionel Swarbrick (11 December 1930 – 12 December 2016) was an Australian rules footballer who played for Geelong in the Victorian Football League (VFL) during the early 1950s.

Swarbrick, despite playing just two seasons, holds a place in Geelong football history for kicking the match winning behind in the dying seconds of their one-point win over North Melbourne in 1953, which beat Collingwood's league record of 20 consecutive VFL victories, set in the 1920s. He was the nephew of club great Lindsay White and appeared in Geelong's losing 1953 VFL Grand Final team as a forward.

He left Geelong to return home in 1954. He took over as Captain-coach of Port Fairy in the Hampden league. He won back to back Maskell Medals with Port Fairy in 1958 and 1959.
