= Colac Football Club =

Australian rules football and netball club

Colac

Names
- Full name: Colac Football and Netball Club
- Nickname: Tigers

2023 season
- Leading goalkicker: Nis
- Best and fairest: Zydy

Club details
- Founded: 1948; 78 years ago
- Colours
- President: Matt Gibson
- Coach: Sebastian Ross
- Captain: Jack Melican
- Ground: Central Reserve

Uniforms
Home

Other information
- Official website: colactigers.com.au

The Colac Tigers Football Netball Club, nicknamed the Tigers, is an Australian rules football and netball club based in the regional city of Colac, Victoria. The club plays at Central Reserve, Colac.

== Geelong District Football League ==
Looking further afield Colac spent three years in the GDFL before distance got the better of them.

== Colac & District Football League ==
Returning to play in the local competition, Colac won the 1939 premiership before disbanding because of World War II in 1940.

== Hampden Football League ==
The current Colac Football Club was founded in 1948 in order to play in the Hampden Football League from 1949. Adopting the jumper worn by the Richmond Football Club, black with a yellow sash, the Colac Tigers won the premiership in their second season. In 1980 Colac merged with their neighbour club Coragulac Football Club and for six years had the title of Colac-Coragulac Football Club. In fifty-two years of competing in the Hampden Football League, Colac won ten premierships.

== Geelong Football League ==
Since 2001, Colac joined the Geelong Football League, club officials claiming that their younger players were working and studying in Geelong and it was difficult to recruit players to play in western Victoria. The club's first grand final came in 2008 where they were defeated by rivals St Mary's. In 2014 the club won their first GFL premiership defeating Leopold. Midfielder Jarryd Garner was adjudged best on ground. After playing finals in 2015 the Tigers look set to blood new talent in an attempt to get senior games into its skilled juniors which will help if the tigers are to play finals yet again this season. With players like Dean Felekos, who is now well into his thirties, the welcoming of youth is a must if they are to stay in the top half of the competition going forward.

== Grand Final 2014 ==
Leopold 11–13–79 V Colac 19–14–128

== Premierships ==
- 1950, 1952, 1953, 1961, 1965, 1980, 1982, 1983, 1985, 1993, 2014

== Bibliography ==
- Cat Country: History of Football In The Geelong Region – John Stoward – ISBN 978-0-9577515-8-3
- Football Country Style: A history of football in the Colac District from 1900–1974 – Bill Doran
- Evergreen Hampden – History of the Hampden Football League 1930–1976 – Fred Bond and Don Grossman
