= John Parish (footballer) =

Australian rules footballer

Personal information
- Full name: John Foster Parish
- Born: 18 September 1875; Winchelsea, Victoria
- Died: 10 February 1944 (aged 68); Warrnambool, Victoria
- Original team: Camperdown
- Height: 179 cm (5 ft 10 in)
- Weight: 81 kg (179 lb)

Playing career^{1}
Years	Club	Games (Goals)
1900	Collingwood	3 (0)
- ^{1} Playing statistics correct to the end of 1900.

John Foster Parish (18 September 1875 – 10 February 1944) was an Australian rules footballer, who played with Collingwood in the Victorian Football League (VFL).
