= Peter Wood (footballer, born 1946) =

Australian rules footballer

Personal information
- Full name: Peter Wood
- Born: 27 January 1946 (age 80)
- Original team: Oakleigh / Camperdown
- Height: 189 cm (6 ft 2 in)
- Weight: 88 kg (194 lb)
- Position: Fullback

Playing career^{1}
Years	Club	Games (Goals)
1965–70	Fitzroy	74 (12)
- ^{1} Playing statistics correct to the end of 1970.

Peter Wood (born 27 January 1946) is a former Australian rules footballer who played with Fitzroy in the Victorian Football League (VFL).
