= Woodford, Victoria =

Woodford Warrnambool, Victoria
- Coordinates: 38°19′S 142°28′E
- Population: 361 (2016 census)
- Postcode(s): 3281
- Location: 266 km (165 mi) SW of Melbourne; 9 km (6 mi) N of Warrnambool, Victoria
- LGA(s): City of Warrnambool
- State electorate(s): South-West Coast
- Federal division(s): Wannon

Woodford is a town in the Western District of Victoria, Australia. located 9 kilometres (6 mi) north of Warrnambool. At the 2016 census, the population of the combined area was 361.

The town is home to Woodford Primary School. The school opened on the midnight of 30 April and 1 May 1854. Back then, the school was small; it was relocated to the hill further north 100 years after its opening. In late August 2001, the bottom flat was flooded after heavy rain. The school closed the day afterwards before re-opening after the water receded.

Woodford Post Office opened on 1 January 1854, and closed sometime in 1975.

Other buildings of interest include the church and a former art gallery. The town is joined with nearby Bushfield to make Woodford-Bushfield.

Woodford has a horse racing club, the Woodford Racing Club, which holds the Woodford Cup meeting on New Years Eve, 31st December at Warrnambool racecourse.
