= Leon Harris (footballer) =

Australian rules footballer and coach

Personal information
- Born: 9 November 1958 (age 67)
- Original team: Mortlake
- Height: 173 cm (5 ft 8 in)
- Weight: 74 kg (163 lb)

Club information
- Current club: Brisbane Lions (recruitment consultant)

Playing career^{1}
Years	Club	Games (Goals)
1979–1989	Fitzroy	186 (101)
- ^{1} Playing statistics correct to the end of 1989.

Leon Harris (born 9 November 1958) is a former Australian rules footballer who played with Fitzroy in the VFL during the 1980s.

Harris played as a rover and finished runner up in Fitzroy's 1987 best and fairest awards. He was the first player in the history of the league to kick 100 goals with the number 38 guernsey. Harris represented Victoria at the 1988 Bicentennial Carnival and after retiring as a player served as a Fitzroy assistant coach.

Leon's brother Bernie Harris played with Fitzroy, the Brisbane Bears and St Kilda in the Victorian/Australian Football League (VFL/AFL).
