= Hugh Worrall =

Australian rules footballer

Personal information
- Full name: Hugh Worrall
- Born: 8 November 1948 (age 77)
- Original team: Cobden
- Height: 180 cm (5 ft 11 in)
- Weight: 74 kg (163 lb)

Playing career^{1}
Years	Club	Games (Goals)
1968–1969	Fitzroy	13 (4)
- ^{1} Playing statistics correct to the end of 1969.

Hugh Worrall (born 8 November 1948) is a former Australian rules footballer who played with Fitzroy in the Victorian Football League (VFL).

Worrall spent two seasons at Fitzroy, mostly as a back pocket defender. He then returned to Cobden and won the Maskell Medal in 1970, 1972 and 1979.
