= Barry Rippon =

Australian rules footballer (born 1940)

Personal information
- Full name: Barry Rippon
- Born: 30 March 1940 (age 86)
- Original team: Camperdown
- Height: 175 cm (5 ft 9 in)
- Weight: 73 kg (161 lb)

Playing career^{1}
Years	Club	Games (Goals)
1963	Fitzroy	3 (5)
- ^{1} Playing statistics correct to the end of 1963.

Barry Rippon (born 30 March 1940) is a former Australian rules footballer who played for the Fitzroy Football Club in the Victorian Football League (VFL).
