= Bushfield, Victoria =

Bushfield Warrnambool, Victoria
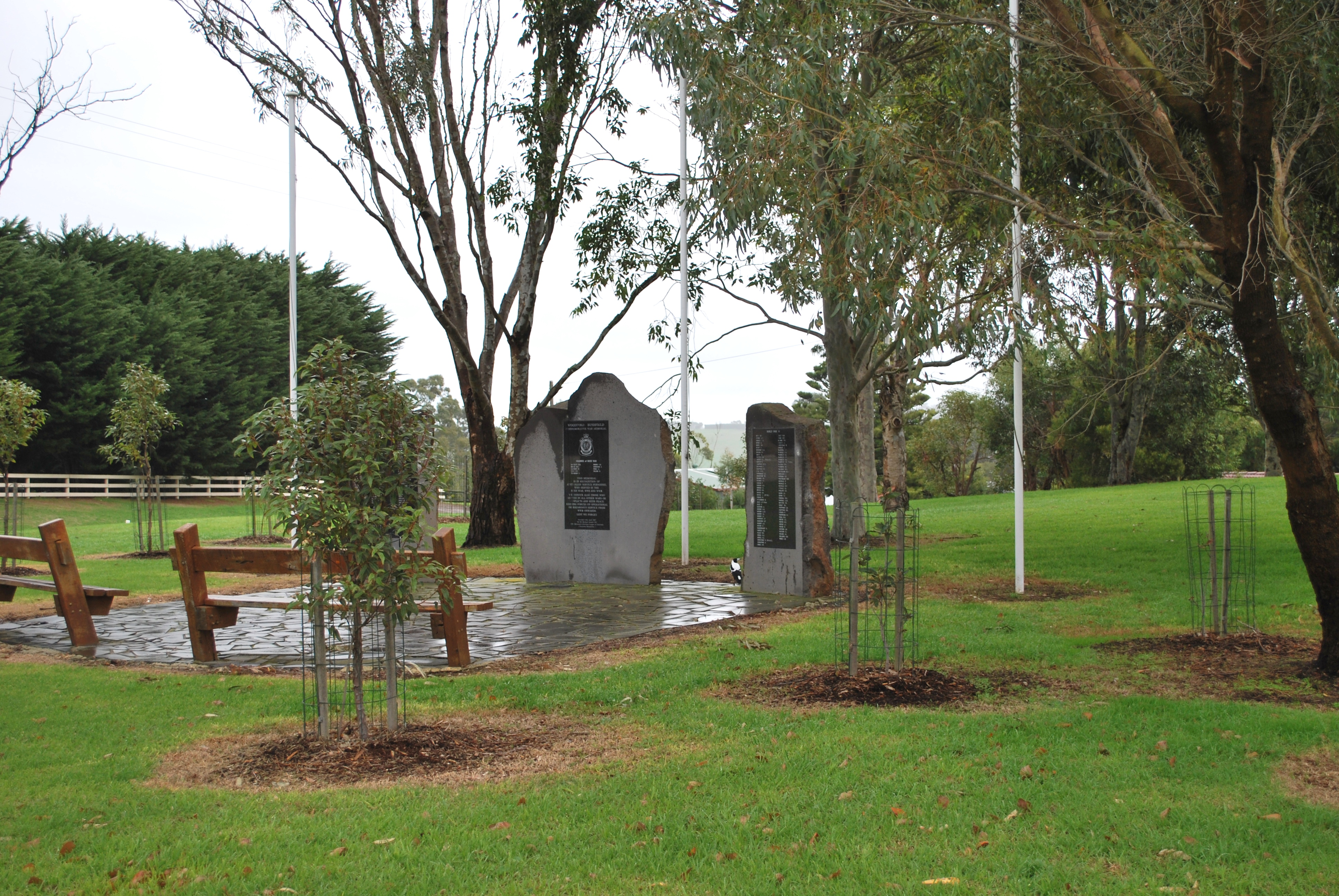
- War memorial

- Coordinates: 38°19′S 142°30′E
- Population: 596 (2021 census)
- Postcode(s): 3281
- Location: 265 km (165 mi) SW of Melbourne; 10 km (6 mi) N of Warrnambool
- LGA(s): City of Warrnambool
- State electorate(s): South-West Coast
- Federal division(s): Wannon

Bushfield is a town in Australia. The town is located 10 kilometres (6 mi) north of Warrnambool, Victoria. It is joined with the nearby Woodford to make Woodford-Bushfield.

At the 2016 census, the population was 571.

Bushfield Post Office opened on 16 February 1885 and closed in 1974.

The Bushfield Oval is popular during the New Year's Eve celebrations. It is the home of the North Warrnambool Football Club, the club was formed when the local Bushfield side merged with the Grassmere team and called themselves Northern Districts. When the club was admitted to the Hampden FL it became North Warrnambool.

The other place of interest is a former milk bar that was taken down in 2002. This milk bar provided lunch orders for students at Woodford Primary School.
