= Daryl Salmon =

Australian rules footballer

Personal information
- Full name: Daryl Salmon
- Born: 25 August 1953 (age 73)
- Original team: Ecklin South
- Height: 183 cm (6 ft 0 in)
- Weight: 75 kg (165 lb)
- Position: Halfback

Playing career^{1}
Years	Club	Games (Goals)
1971–74	Collingwood	56 (0)
- ^{1} Playing statistics correct to the end of 1974.

Daryl Salmon (born 25 August 1953) is a former Australian rules footballer who played with Collingwood in the Australian Football League.
