= Dennington, Victoria =

Dennington
- Suburb
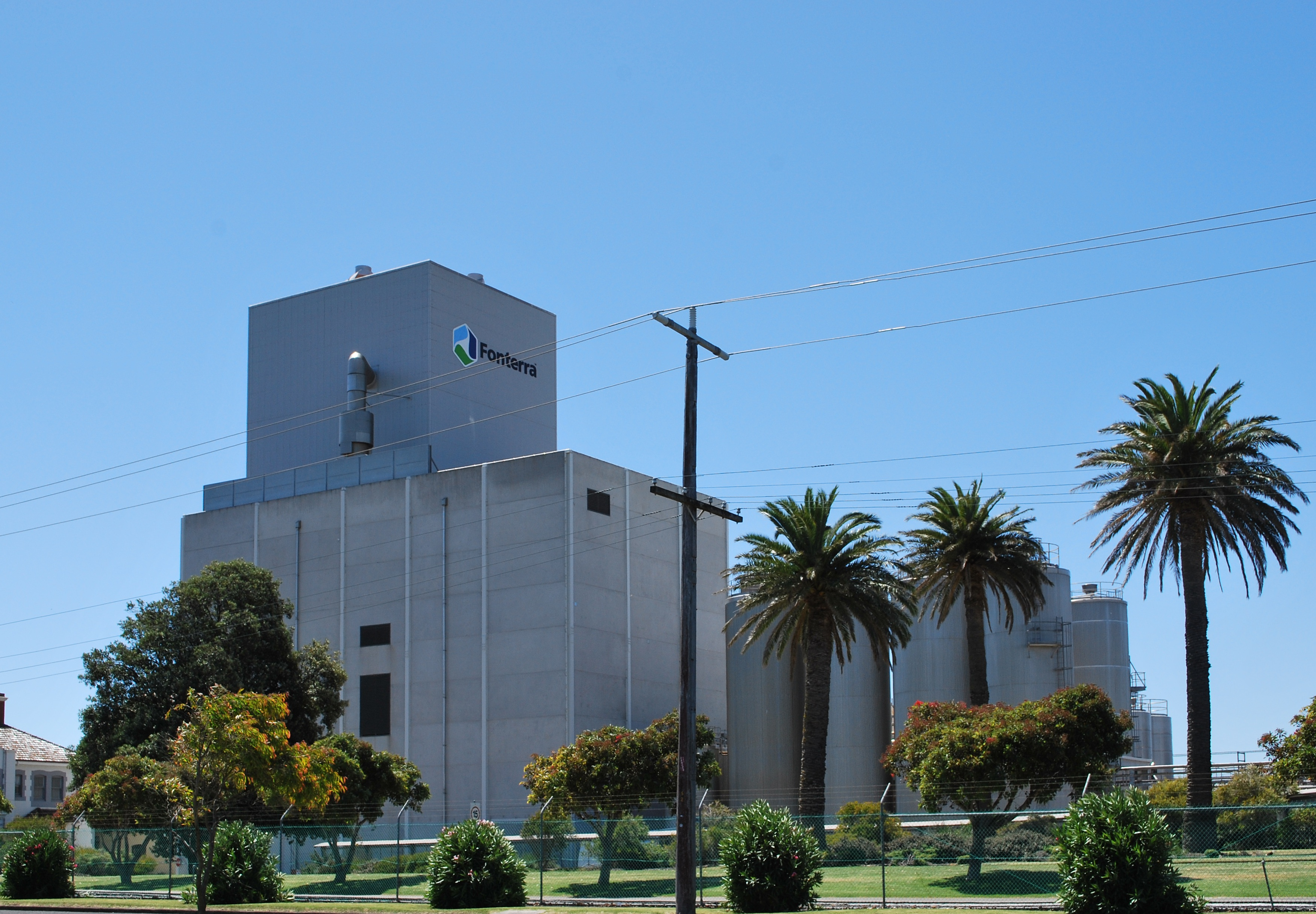
- Powdered milk factory at Dennington

- Interactive map of Dennington
- Coordinates: 38°21′21″S 142°26′29″E
- Country: Australia
- State: Victoria
- City: Warrnambool
- LGA: City of Warrnambool
- Location: 270 km (170 mi) SW of Melbourne; 5 km (3.1 mi) NW of Warrnambool

Government
  - State electorate: South West Coast
  - Federal division: Wannon

Population
  - Total: 1,907 (2016 census)
- Postcode: 3280

Dennington is a suburb of Warrnambool, in the Western District of Victoria, Australia. It is located in the City of Warrnambool local government area, 270 kilometres (170 mi) south-west of the state capital, Melbourne, and 5 kilometres (3.1 mi) north-west of the regional centre of Warrnambool. At the 2016 census, Dennington had a population of 1,907.

Dennington was home to a large bulk milk powder plant operated by New Zealand dairy co-operative, Fonterra. When opened by Nestlé in 1911, it was the world's largest condensed milk plant. The plant was closed in 2019 and is now owned by Provico.

The suburb lies on the Merri River.
