= Bruce Murray (footballer, born 1933) =

Australian rules footballer

Personal information
- Full name: Bruce Gilbert Murray
- Born: 23 February 1933
- Died: 30 January 1981 (aged 47); Highton, Victoria
- Original team: Camperdown
- Height: 188 cm (6 ft 2 in)
- Weight: 86 kg (190 lb)
- Position: Defence

Playing career^{1}
Years	Club	Games (Goals)
1953–54	Geelong	8 (2)
1956–57	St Kilda	16 (5)
Total		24 (7)
- ^{1} Playing statistics correct to the end of 1957.

Bruce Gilbert Murray (23 February 1933 – 30 January 1981) was an Australian rules footballer who played with Geelong and St Kilda in the Victorian Football League (VFL).
