= Brian McKenzie (footballer) =

Australian rules footballer

Personal information
- Full name: Brian McKenzie
- Born: 31 March 1947 (age 79)
- Original team: Terang
- Height: 183 cm (6 ft 0 in)
- Weight: 80 kg (176 lb)
- Position: Half back / back pocket

Playing career^{1}
| Years | Club | Games (Goals) |
| 1966–72 | Collingwood | 81 (0) |
- ^{1} Playing statistics correct to the end of 1972.

Brian McKenzie is a former Australian rules footballer who played with Collingwood in the Victorian Football League (VFL).
