= Port Fairy Football Club =

Port Fairy

Names
- Full name: Port Fairy Football Netball Club
- Nickname(s): Seagulls

Club details
- Founded: 1868
- Colours
- Competition: Hampden FNL
- Premierships: 1 (1958)
- Ground(s): Gardens Oval

Uniforms
Home

The Port Fairy Football Club, nicknamed the Seagulls, is an Australian rules football and netball club based in the coastal town of Port Fairy, Victoria. The club teams currently compete in the Hampden Football Netball League, with its football squad having played there since 1949.

== Premierships ==
- Warrnambool District Football Association (1900–1923)
  - 1902, 1904, 1922
- Western District Football League (1924–1933)
  - 1925, 1926, 1928, 1929
- Port Fairy Football League (1924–1948)
  - 1924, 1930, 1935, 1940, 1946, 1947
- Hampden Football Netball League (1949–current)
  - 1958

== Maskell Medallists ==
- George Swarbrick 1958 & 1959
- Gary Hiscox 1967
- Les Gibb 1969
- Kevin Leske 1975
- Maurice O'Keefe 1984
- Michael Taylor 1986

== Notable players ==
VFL/AFL players recruited from Port Fairy include:

- Scott Crow (Hawthorn/Collingwood)
- Ted Llewellyn (Geelong/North Melbourne)
- Noel Mugavin (Fitzroy/Richmond)
- Jim Warren (Geelong)

== Bibliography ==
- Evergreen Hampden: The Hampden Football League and its people, 1930-1976 by Fred Bond & Don Grossman, 1979 – ISBN 0868251089
- History of Football in the Western District by John Stoward – Aussie Footy Books, 2008 – ISBN 9780957751590
