= Terang Mortlake Football Club =

Terang Mortlake

Names
- Full name: Terang Mortlake Football Netball Club
- Nickname(s): Bloods

Club details
- Founded: 2001; 24 years ago
- Colours
- Competition: Hampden Football League
- Premierships: 3 (2004, 2005, 2008)
- Ground(s): Terang Recreation Reserve, D.C. Farren Oval, Mortlake

Uniforms
Home

The Terang Mortlake Football Netball Club, nicknamed the Bloods, is an Australian rules football and netball club based in the Victorian towns of Terang and Mortlake. The club teams currently compete in the Hampden Football Netball League.

The club is the result of an amalgamation of two of the founding clubs of the league –Terang FC and Mortlake FC– in 2001. Terang Mortlake debuted in the league in 2002.

== Football Premierships ==
Hampden Football League

Seniors

- (3): 2004, 2005, 2008

== Football League - Best & Fairest ==
Hampden Football League

Seniors - Maskell Medal

- 2004: Luke Vogels
- 2002: David Ryan

Reserves

== Notable players ==
- Luke Vogels - Sydney Swans
- Chris Heffernan (Essendon FC, Melbourne FC)
- Jordie McKenzie (Melbourne FC)
- Luke Rounds Collingwood
- Lewis Taylor Brisbane Lions
- Alan McConnell (Footscray)
- Ron Wearmouth (Collingwood)
- Ian Payne (Essendon)
- Charlie Payne (Essendon)
- Daryl Griffith (St Kilda)
- Dick Wearmouth (Footscray)
