= Shire of Heywood =

Shire of Heywood Victoria
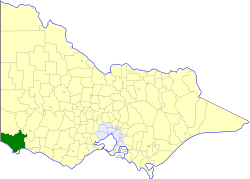
- Location in Victoria
- The Shire of Heywood as at its dissolution in 1994
- Population: 7,500 (1992)
  - Density: 1.993/km^{2} (5.16/sq mi)
- Established: 1856
- Area: 3,764 km^{2} (1,453.3 sq mi)
- Council seat: Heywood
- Region: Barwon South West
- County: Normanby, Follett
LGAs around Shire of Heywood:
Penola (SA)	Glenelg	Dundas
Mount Gambier (SA); Port MacDonnell (SA)	Shire of Heywood	Minhamite
Southern Ocean	Portland	Belfast

The Shire of Heywood was a local government area about 360 kilometres (224 mi) west-southwest of Melbourne, the state capital of Victoria, Australia. The shire covered an area of 3,764 square kilometres (1,453.3 sq mi), and existed from 1856 until 1994.

It was, for most of its life, known as the Shire of Portland.

== History ==
Heywood was first incorporated as the Portland Road District on 25 January 1856, which became the Shire of Portland on 8 December 1863. On 23 April 1958 and 31 May 1968, it lost parts of its area to the Town of Portland, and on 1 October 1988, it was renamed the Shire of Heywood.

On 23 September 1994, the Shire of Heywood was abolished, and along with the City of Portland and most of the Shire of Glenelg, was merged into the new Shire of Glenelg.

== Wards ==
The Shire of Heywood was divided into four ridings, each of which elected three councillors:

- East Riding
- South Riding
- West Riding
- Central Riding

== Towns and localities ==
- Allestree
- Bolwarra
- Branxholme
- Cape Bridgewater
- Cape Nelson
- Cashmore
- Dartmoor
- Drumborg
- Gorae West
- Greenwald
- Heathmere
- Heywood*
- Homerton
- Hotspur
- Kentbruck
- Lake Condah
- Lower Glenelg
- Milltown
- Mount Richmond
- Mumbannar
- Narrawong
- Nelson
- Tarragal
- Trewalla
- Tyrendarra
- Wade Junction

* Council seat.

== Population ==
Year	Population
1954	7,056
1958	7,370*
1961	6,982
1966	6,859
1971	6,439
1976	6,368
1981	6,791
1986	7,211
1991	7,125

* Estimate in the 1958 Victorian Year Book.
