= List of places of worship in Glenelg Shire =

This is a list of places of worship in the Shire of Glenelg, a local government area in the state of Victoria, Australia. The list includes active and former churches and other religious buildings representing a variety of Christian denominations and other faiths.

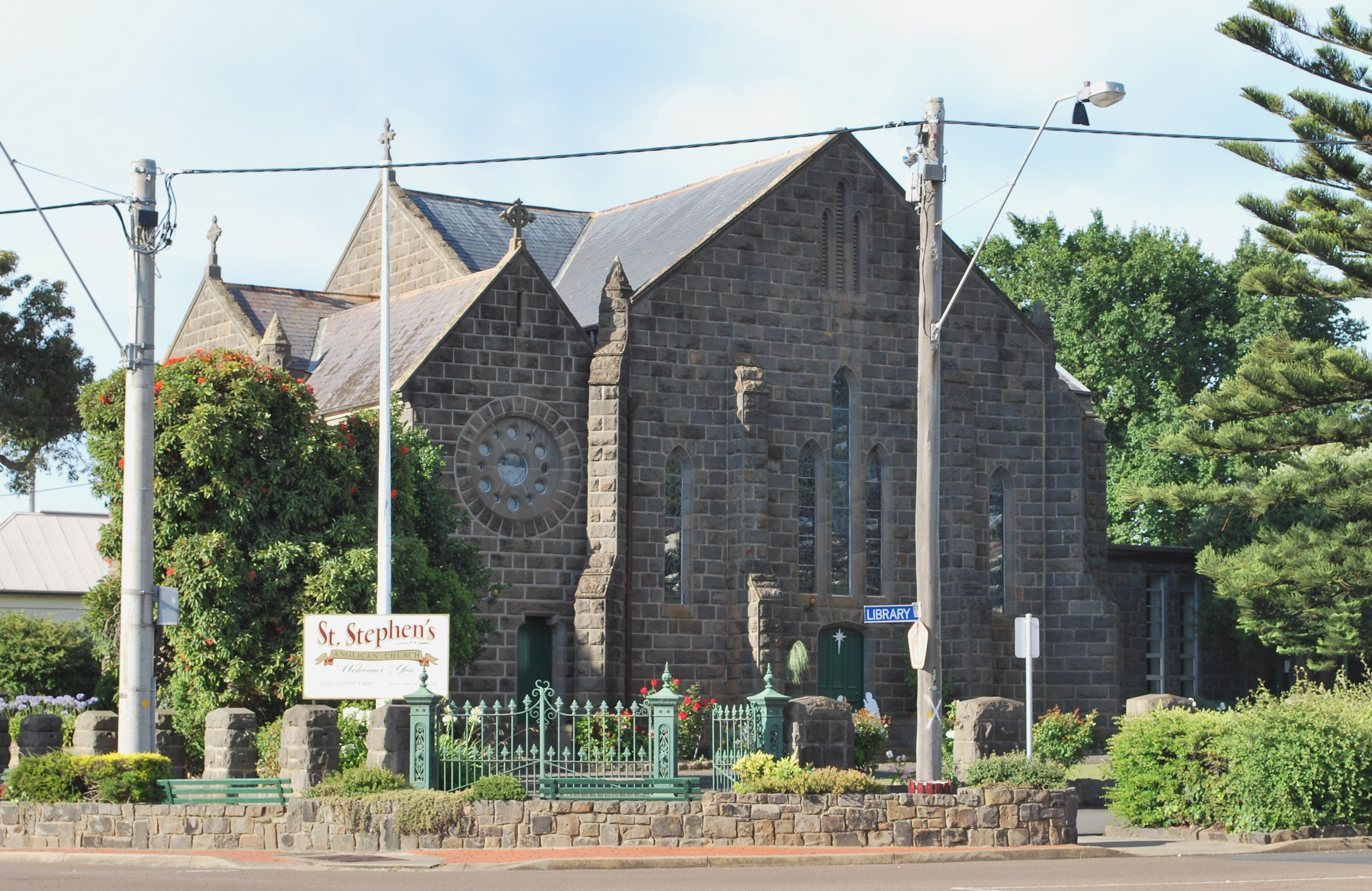
St Stephen's Anglican Church, Portland

== Heritage listing status ==
Style	Status
Yes	Listed on the Victorian Heritage Register
–	Not listed

== Current places of worship ==
Current places of worship
Name	Image	Location	Denomination/ Affiliation	Heritage listing	Notes	Refs
St Peter's Anglican Church, Tahara		Tahara; 37.743050°S 141.704898°E	Anglican	Yes		
Portland Uniting Church		Portland; 38.347072°S 141.603159°E	Uniting (formerly Wesleyan)	Yes		
Portland Christian Church (Rock Church)		Portland; 38.327535°S 141.592292°E	Australian Christian Churches (Pentecostal)	–		
Portland Baptist Church (new)		Portland; 38.327474°S 141.598987°E	Baptist	–		
Scots Presbyterian Church		Portland; 38.344524°S 141.604496°E	Presbyterian	Yes		
All Saints' Catholic Church, Portland		Portland; 38.345981°S 141.605906°E	Catholic	Yes		
St John's Lutheran Church, Portland		Portland; 38.343998°S 141.605894°E	Lutheran	–		
South West Community Church		Portland; 38.348194°S 141.604477°E	Christian Revival (Pentecostal)	–		
St Stephen's Anglican Church, Portland		Portland; 38.348772°S 141.603215°E	Anglican	Yes		
Digby Uniting Church		Digby; 37.805657°S 141.530888°E	Uniting (formerly Presbyterian)	Yes		
Portland Seventh-day Adventist Church		Portland; 38.362832°S 141.604182°E	Seventh-day Adventist	–		
St John the Evangelist Anglican Church, Digby		Digby; 37.802558°S 141.530458°E	Anglican	Yes		
Scots Uniting Church (new)		Casterton; 37.586806°S 141.400084°E	Uniting (formerly Presbyterian)	Yes		
St John's Anglican Church, Heywood		Heywood; 38.133386°S 141.626676°E	Anglican	Yes		
Sacred Heart Catholic Church		Casterton; 37.585652°S 141.412608°E	Catholic	Yes		
Heywood Uniting Church		Heywood; 38.130507°S 141.627229°E	Uniting (formerly Methodist)	–		
St Paul's Lutheran Church, Heywood		Heywood; 38.130776°S 141.625363°E	Lutheran	–		
Christ Church, Casterton		Casterton; 37.587322°S 141.399096°E	Anglican	Yes		

== Former places of worship ==
Former places of worship
Name	Image	Location	Denomination/ Affiliation	Heritage listing	Notes	Refs
Citiport (Christian Outreach Centre) (formerly Portland Church of Christ)		Portland; 38.344373°S 141.601534°E	Pentecostal (formerly Church of Christ)	–		
Portland Baptist Church (old)		Portland; 38.348959°S 141.604224°E	Baptist	Yes		
Drik Drik Uniting Church		Drik Drik; 37.988405°S 141.294143°E	Uniting (formerly Presbyterian)	Yes		
Casterton Methodist Church		Casterton; 37.587400°S 141.400212°E	Methodist	Yes		
Digby Catholic Church		Digby; 37.804664°S 141.531823°E	Catholic	Non-existent		
Digby Methodist Church		Digby; 37.805164°S 141.530597°E	Methodist	Non-existent		
St Andrew's Uniting Church, Merino		Merino; 37.716832°S 141.553278°E	Uniting (formerly Presbyterian)	Yes		
St Mary's Anglican Church, Sandford		Sandford; 37.615752°S 141.447098°E	Anglican	Yes		
St Peter's Anglican Church, Cape Bridgewater		Cape Bridgewater; 38.341490°S 141.427981°E	Anglican	Yes		
St John's Catholic Church, Sandford		Sandford; 37.611054°S 141.442082°E	Catholic	Yes		
Sandford Presbyterian Church		Sandford; 37.611016°S 141.442953°E	Presbyterian	Non-existent		
Cape Bridgewater Uniting Church		Cape Bridgewater; 38.341350°S 141.429306°E	Uniting (formerly Methodist)	Yes		
Tyrendarra Uniting Church		Tyrendarra; 38.217625°S 141.782266°E	Uniting (formerly Methodist)	Yes		
Cape Bridgewater Presbyterian Church		Cape Bridgewater; 38.371229°S 141.399573°E	Presbyterian	Non-existent		
St Gregory the Great Catholic Church		Heywood; 38.127152°S 141.631064°E	Catholic	Yes		
St Paul's Anglican Church, Henty		Henty; 37.658389°S 141.504104°E	Anglican	Yes		
St James' Anglican Church, Tyrendarra		Tyrendarra; 38.219483°S 141.775943°E	Anglican	Yes		
Drik Drik Methodist Chapel		Drik Drik; 37.986734°S 141.295004°E	Methodist	Yes		
St Peter's Anglican Church, Merino		Merino; 37.718857°S 141.553273°E	Anglican	Yes		
St Catherine's Anglican Church, Warrock (St Catherine's Anglican Church, Roseneath)		Warrock; 37.446076°S 141.276167°E	Anglican	Yes		
Scots Presbyterian Church, Casterton (old)		Casterton; 37.586314°S 141.401316°E	Presbyterian	Yes		
Cape Bridgewater Methodist Chapel (Kennedys Road)		Cape Bridgewater; 38.289672°S 141.397560°E	Methodist	Yes		
Condah Mission Church		Lake Condah; 38.074454°S 141.792156°E	Anglican	Yes		
Immaculate Conception Catholic Church		Merino; 37.718017°S 141.550606°E	Catholic	–		
St Andrew's Presbyterian Church, Heywood		Heywood; 38.131647°S 141.632517°E	Presbyterian	–		
St Thomas' Anglican Church, Condah		Condah; 37.952265°S 141.750682°E	Anglican	–		
Condah Presbyterian Church		Condah; 37.959598°S 141.743572°E	Presbyterian	–		
St Patrick's Catholic Church, Condah		Condah; 37.955043°S 141.743318°E	Catholic	–		
St Andrew's Uniting Church, Dartmoor		Dartmoor; 37.920875°S 141.277734°E	Uniting (formerly Presbyterian)	–		
St Patrick's Catholic Church, Dartmoor		Dartmoor; 37.920569°S 141.277547°E	Catholic	–		
St George's Anglican Church, Dartmoor		Dartmoor; 37.922804°S 141.277290°E	Anglican	–		
Wattle Hill Methodist Chapel		Portland; 38.344678°S 141.569461°E	Methodist	Non-existent		
Dergholm Presbyterian Church		Dergholm; 37.370240°S 141.215585°E	Presbyterian	–		
St Philip's Anglican Church, Breakaway Creek		Breakaway Creek; 37.997242°S 141.781430°E	Anglican	–		
Nelson Presbyterian Church		Nelson; 38.046748°S 141.011283°E	Presbyterian	–		
Wilderness Uniting Church		Strathdownie; 37.739783°S 141.086907°E	Uniting (formerly Presbyterian)	–		

== See also ==
- List of places of worship in Colac Otway Shire
