= Shire of Glenelg (former) =

Coordinates: 37°35′S 141°24′E

Shire of Glenelg Victoria
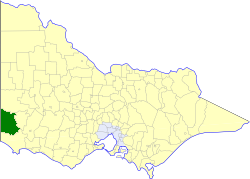
- Location in Victoria
- The former Shire of Glenelg as at its dissolution in 1994
- Population: 4,270 (1992)
  - Density: 1.1941/km^{2} (3.093/sq mi)
- Established: 1863
- Area: 3,576 km^{2} (1,380.7 sq mi)
- Council seat: Casterton
- Region: Barwon South West
- County: Dundas, Follett, Normanby
LGAs around Shire of Glenelg:
| Lucindale (SA) | Kowree | Wannon |
| Penola (SA) | Shire of Glenelg | Wannon |
| Mount Gambier (SA) | Heywood | Heywood |

The Shire of Glenelg was a local government area about 360 kilometres (224 mi) west of Melbourne, the state capital of Victoria, Australia. The shire covered an area of 3,576 square kilometres (1,380.7 sq mi), and existed from 1863 until 1994.

== History ==
Glenelg was first incorporated as a road district on 2 September 1863, and became a shire on 30 June 1864.

On 23 September 1994, the Shire of Glenelg was abolished, and along with the City of Portland and parts of the Shire of Heywood, was merged into the new Shire of Glenelg.

=== Ridings ===
Glenelg was not subdivided into ridings, and its 12 councillors represented the entire shire.

== Towns and localities ==
- Casterton*
- Chetwynd
- Dergholm
- Henty
- Merino
- Paschendale
- Poolaijelo
- Sandford
- Strathdownie
- Wando Vale

* Council seat.

== Population ==
| Year | Population |
|---|---|
| 1954 | 5,949 |
| 1958 | 6,300* |
| 1961 | 5,887 |
| 1966 | 5,838 |
| 1971 | 5,148 |
| 1976 | 4,840 |
| 1981 | 4,462 |
| 1986 | 4,237 |
| 1991 | 4,060 |

* Estimate in the 1958 Victorian Year Book.
