= Casterton News =

Australian newspaper

The Casterton News and the Merino and Sandford Record

The Casterton News is an English language newspaper published weekly in the town of Casterton, Victoria, Australia.

== History ==
The Casterton News and the Merino and Sandford Record was established in 1869. It later moved to Portland and was published as the Western Advertiser. In 1982, the Spectator-Observer Group bought it to again serve as the local paper for Casterton and in 1989 the name reverted to the Casterton News. The paper covers the areas rounding Casterton, Coleraine, Merino, Chetwynd, Portland, Hamilton, Heywood, Edenhope, Dartmoor and Mount Gambier. Alternative titles for the publication include: Casterton news and Western Shires Advertiser, and Casterton News, Western Shires Advertiser and the Merino and Sandford Record, Casterton News and Western Shires advertiser and the Aspley, Edenhope and Harrow Advertiser.

== Digitization ==
The paper has been digitised as part of the Australian Newspapers Digitisation Program of the National Library of Australia.

== See also ==
List of newspapers in Australia
