= Henty =

Henty may refer to:

== Places ==
=== Australia ===
- Henty, New South Wales
- Henty, Victoria
- Henty (wine) an Australian geographical indicator and wine region in southwestern Victoria
- Division of Henty, a former federal electorate in Victoria
- Henty Highway, western Victoria
- Henty, Western Australia, a locality in the Shire of Dardanup
- Henty Gold Mine, Tasmania
- Henty River, Tasmania

== People ==
- The Henty brothers prominent in early Victorian and Tasmanian white settlement:
  - James Henty (1800–1882), founded James Henty and Company, merchants
  - Charles Henty (1807–1864), banker and member of the Tasmanian House of Assembly
  - William Henty (1808–1881), solicitor, member of the Tasmanian Legislative Council for Tamar, and colonial secretary in the Weston cabinet
  - Edward Henty (1810–1878), pioneer, first permanent settler in Victoria in 1834
  - Stephen George Henty (1811–1872), member of the Legislative Council of Victoria, 1856–1870
  - John Henty (1813-1868?)
  - Francis Henty (1815–1889), farmer and grazier
- Denham Henty
- Edward Henty (cricketer) (1839–1900), English cricketer
- Ernest Henty MLC (1862–1905), Western Australian politician
- G. A. Henty (1832–1902), British novelist
- Thomas Henty (born Thomas John Cooper 1956–1988), English actor
- Thomas Henty (Australian politician) (c. 1836–1887), Victorian MLC
