= Stokes River =

Stokes
- Location of the Stokes River mouth in Victoria

Location
- Country: Australia
- State: Victoria (Australia)
- Region: Victorian Midlands, Naracoorte Coastal Plain (IBRA), Western District
- Local government area: Glenelg Shire

Physical characteristics
- Source
  - location: east of Digby
  - coordinates: 37°48′1″S 141°34′51″E
  - elevation: 140 m (460 ft)
- Mouth: confluence with Glenelg River
  - location: north of Dartmoor
  - coordinates: 37°52′54″S 141°18′0″E
  - elevation: 23 m (75 ft)
- Length: 35 km (22 mi)

Basin features
- River system: Glenelg Hopkins catchment
- Tributaries
  - left: Humpy Creek, Bobby Creek, McKenzie Creek (Victoria), Teakettle Creek
  - right: Buckle Creek, Morgan Creek (Victoria)

The Stokes River, a perennial river of the Glenelg Hopkins catchment, is located in the Western District of Victoria, Australia.

== Course and features ==
The Stokes River rises northeast of Digby, and flows generally west by south, joined by six minor tributaries, before reaching its confluence with the Glenelg River north of Dartmoor. The river descends 117 metres (384 ft) over its 35-kilometre (22 mi) course.

== See also ==
- List of rivers of Australia § Victoria
