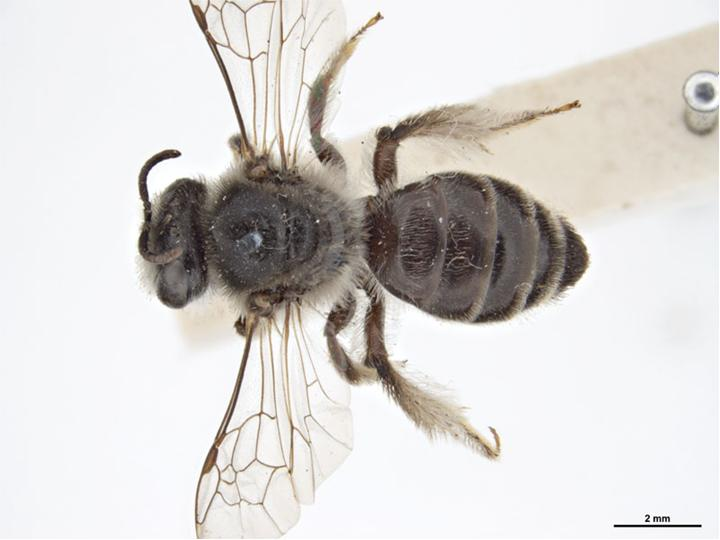
- Female

Scientific classification
- Kingdom: Animalia
- Phylum: Arthropoda
- Clade: Pancrustacea
- Class: Insecta
- Order: Hymenoptera
- Family: Colletidae
- Genus: Leioproctus
- Species: L. providellus

Binomial name
- Leioproctus providellus (Cockerell, 1905)

Synonyms
- Paracolletes providellus Cockerell, 1905; Paracolletes obscuripennis Cockerell, 1905; Paracolletes plebeius Cockerell, 1921; Paracolletes regalis Cockerell, 1921; Paracolletes providellus caerulescens Cockerell, 1929

= Leioproctus providellus =

Species of bee

Leioproctus providellus, or Leioproctus (Leioproctus) providellus, is a species of bee in the family Colletidae and subfamily Colletinae. It is endemic to Australia. It was described by British-American entomologist Theodore Dru Alison Cockerell in 1905.

== Distribution and habitat ==
The species occurs in eastern mainland Australia. Published localities include Windsor, Emerald, Gorae West and Mount Buffalo in Victoria.

== Behaviour ==
The adults are flying mellivores. Flowering plants visited by the bees include Eucalyptus and Leptospermum species.

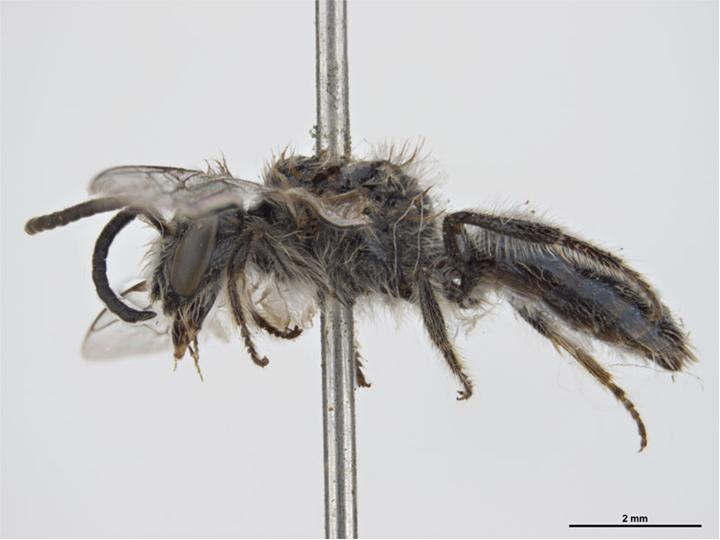
Male
