= Western Victoria =

Western Victoria generally refers to the western portion of the Australian state of Victoria, or places named after this region.

Western Victoria may refer to:

- Western District (Victoria), a district in western Victoria
- Western Victoria Region, a region of the Victorian Legislative Council
- Western Victoria (wine region), a wine region located in western Victoria
