= Henty wine region =

Henty
- Wine region
- Type: Australian geographical indication
- Year established: 2000
- Years of wine industry: 1964–present
- Country: Australia
- Part of: Western Victoria
- Climate region: Maritime
- Heat units: 1204
- No. of vineyards: more than 20
- Varietals produced: Chardonnay, Pinot noir, Sauvignon blanc, Riesling, Cabernet Sauvignon, Merlot
- No. of wineries: 12

The Henty wine region is an Australian wine region. It has one of the cooler climates of any Australian wine region and is known for its white wine production of Chardonnay, Riesling, Semillon and Sauvignon blanc as well as a small red wine production of Pinot noir. Prior to the registration of the AGI as "Henty", the region was known as Drumborg or Far South-west Victoria.

The Henty wine region covers the southwestern corner of the state of Victoria. It is bounded by the South Australian border to the west and the coastline to the south. The eastern boundary at the coast is the mouth of the Hopkins River near Warrnambool. The town of Dunkeld is excluded, but Cavendish is in on the northeastern side. The northwestern boundary includes the Penola-Dergholm Road, then the Glenelg River as far upstream as the Natimuk-Hamilton Road. The town of Henty is close to the centre of the region.

The region includes the areas first settled in 1834 by the Henty brothers, who are believed to have also brought grape vine cuttings which did not survive. The first commercial plantings were 100 hectares (250 acres) planted at Drumborg in 1964 by Seppelts.

== See also ==
- Victorian wine
