= Henty, Victoria =

Henty Victoria
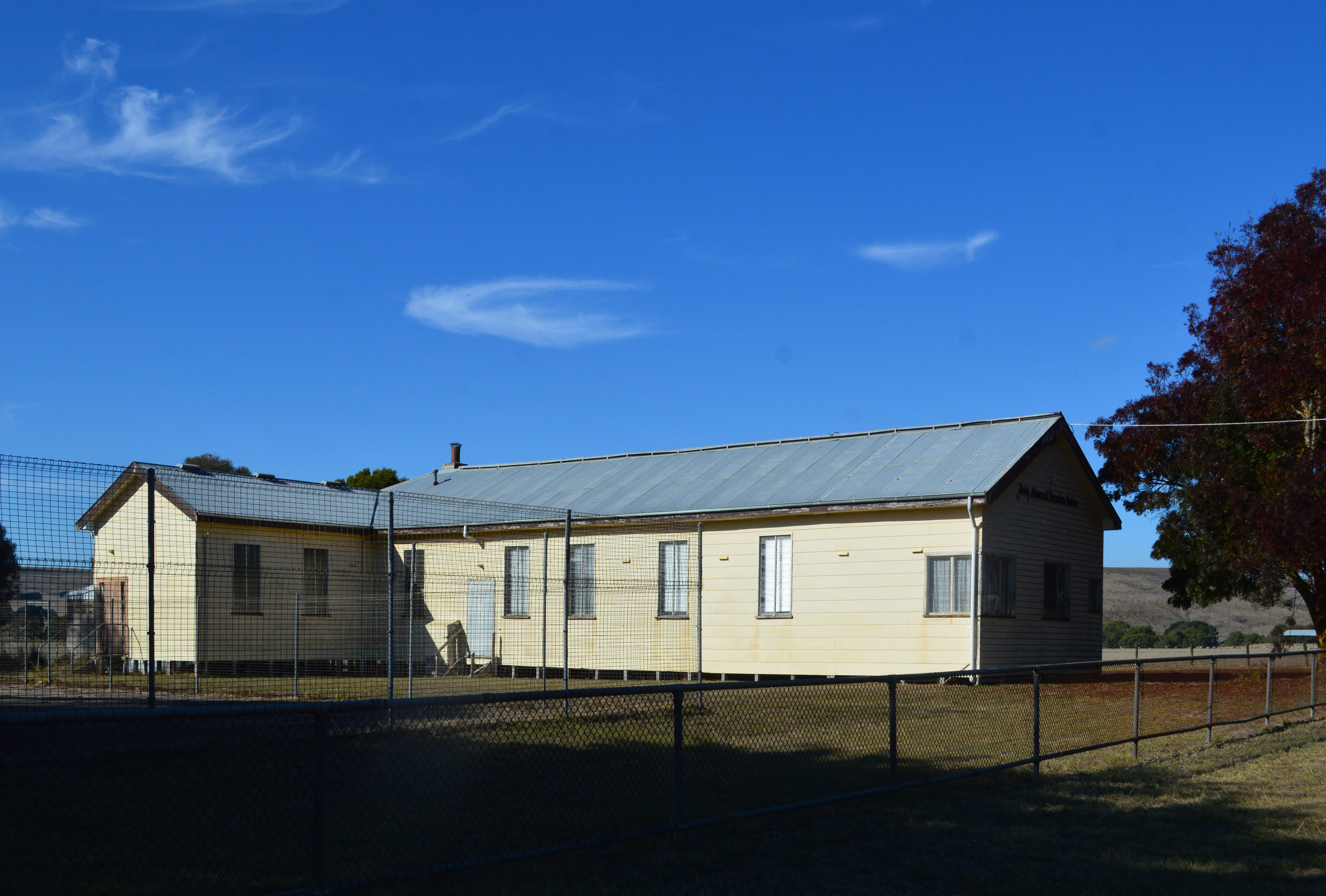
- Henty Memorial Hall (opened 1955)

- Coordinates: 37°39′36″S 141°30′47″E
- Population: 60 (2016 census)
- Postcode(s): 3312
- Location: 373 km (232 mi) W of Melbourne; 55 km (34 mi) W of Hamilton; 15 km (9 mi) SW of Casterton
- LGA(s): Shire of Glenelg
- State electorate(s): Lowan
- Federal division(s): Wannon

Henty is a town in southwestern Victoria, Australia. The town is located in the Shire of Glenelg local government area, 373 kilometres (232 mi) west of the state capital, Melbourne.

Henty is in the middle of the Henty wine region, which is also named after the early settlers.

== History ==
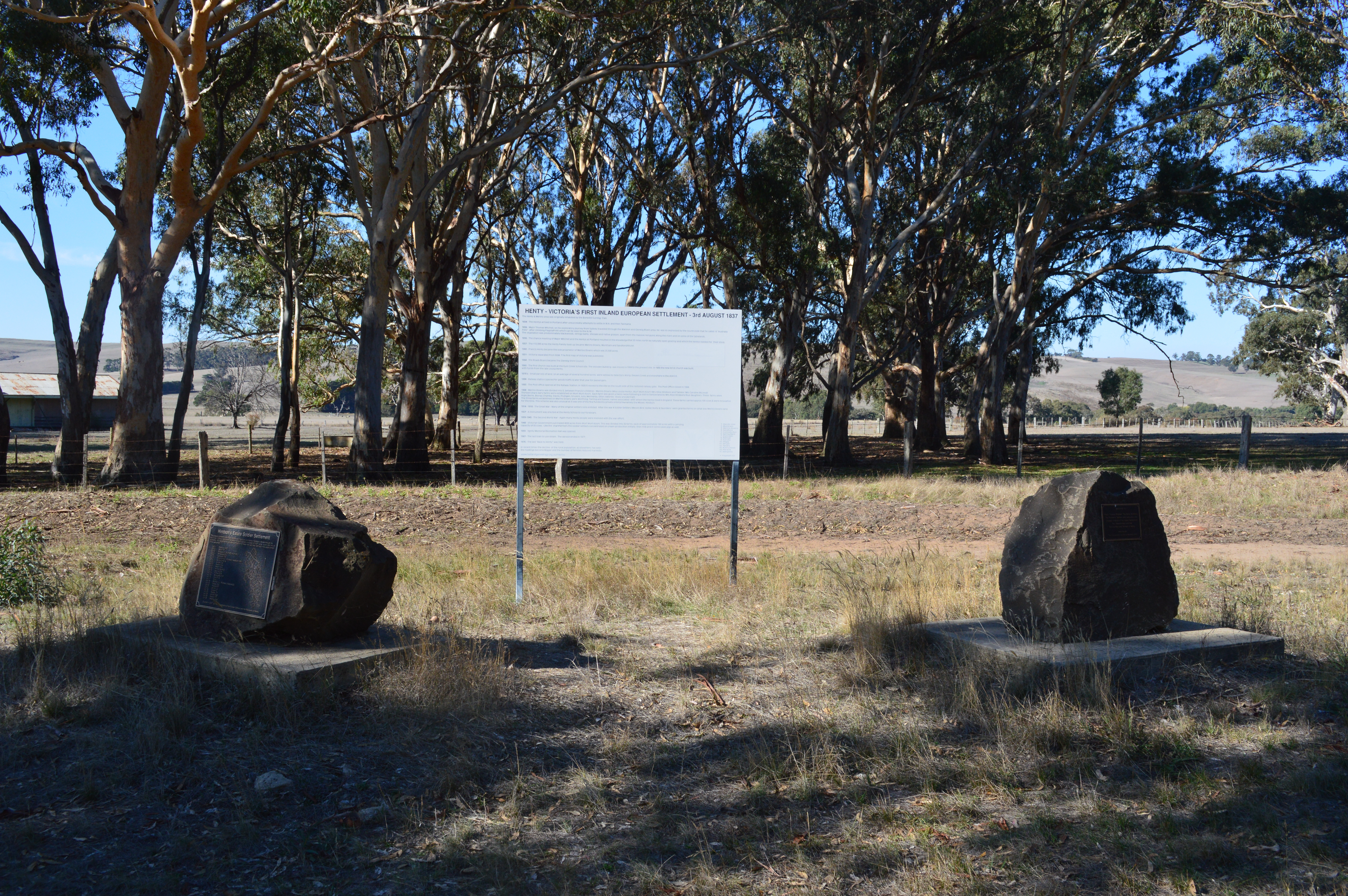
Henty Victoria Sign and Monuments

The Henty and Merino area was the region of the first white settlement in what is now Victoria by the Henty brothers, starting in 1834. The indigenous custodians were the Bonedai Gundigj clan.

The railway station opened in 1884, on the Casterton railway line branch from the Portland line at Branxholme. The station closed in 1967 and the line in 1977.

Parts of the early pastoral runs were later used for soldier settlement schemes after both world wars. The World War II scheme provided a total of 3,597 acres (1,456 ha) in 25 lots to returned soldiers and their families in what was known as Hindson's Estate.

Henty Post Office opened on 16 April 1885 and closed in 1977.

== Traditional ownership ==
The formally recognised traditional owners for the area in which Henty sits are the Gunditjmara People who are represented by the Gunditj Mirring Traditional Owners Aboriginal Corporation.
