= Leioproctus nitidulus =

Scientific classification
- Kingdom: Animalia
- Phylum: Arthropoda
- Clade: Pancrustacea
- Class: Insecta
- Order: Hymenoptera
- Family: Colletidae
- Genus: Leioproctus
- Species: L. nitidulus

Binomial name
- Leioproctus nitidulus (Cockerell, 1916)

Synonyms
- Paracolletes nitidulus Cockerell, 1916

Species of bee

Leioproctus nitidulus, or Leioproctus (Leioproctus) nitidulus, is a species of bee in the family Colletidae and subfamily Colletinae. It is endemic to Australia. It was described by British-American entomologist Theodore Dru Alison Cockerell in 1916.

== Description ==
Female body length is 9.5–10 mm, male is about 8.5 mm. Colouration is mainly glossy black, with white, brownish and black hair.

== Distribution and habitat ==
The species occurs in both south-western and south-eastern mainland Australia. The type locality is Yallingup, Western Australia. It has also been recorded from Gorae West in Victoria.

== Behaviour ==
The adults are flying mellivores. Flowering plants visited by the bees include Eucalyptus and Leptospermum species.
