= Cape Bridgewater =

Cape Bridgewater Victoria
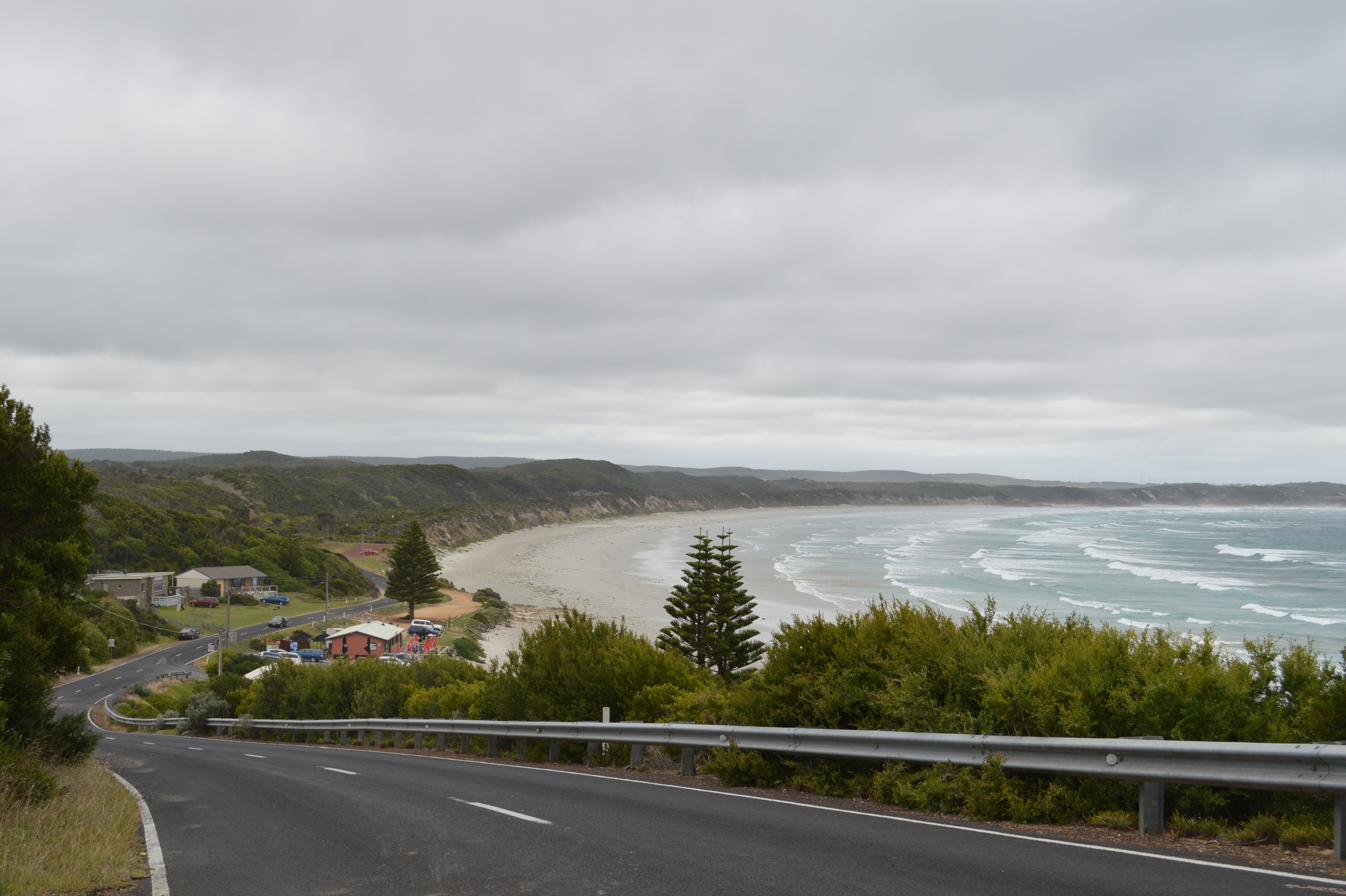
- Looking down towards the Cape Bridgewater foreshore area

- Coordinates: 38°22′0″S 141°24′0″E
- Population: 151 (2021 census)
- Postcode(s): 3305
- Location: 377 km (234 mi) SW of Melbourne; 19 km (12 mi) W of Portland
- LGA(s): Shire of Glenelg
- State electorate(s): South-West Coast
- Federal division(s): Wannon
Localities around Cape Bridgewater:
Mount Richmond	Mount Richmond; Gorae West	Gorae West
Ocean	Cape Bridgewater	Cashmore; Portland West
Ocean	Ocean	Ocean
- Footnotes: Adjoining localities

Cape Bridgewater is a locality in the Australian state of Victoria located on the western shore of Bridgewater Bay about 21 kilometres (13 mi) south-west of Portland and about 383 kilometres (238 mi) west of Melbourne.

The area was settled in the 1860s by the Henty family who had settled nearby Portland, and a post office opened in 1863 (closed 1968) though known as Bridgewater Lower for some years.

Both Cape Bridgewater and Bridgewater Bay were named after the Duke of Bridgewater (1756-1829), by Lieutenant James Grant sailing on the Lady Nelson on 4 December 1800.

Cape Bridgewater includes the following protected areas within its boundaries - the Discovery Bay Coastal Park and the Mount Richmond National Park.

Cape Bridgewater is home to a colony of up to 650 fur seals and has the highest coastal cliff in Victoria. These cliffs are a suitable spot to observe southern right whales in winter and spring. The cape itself also boasts a large blowhole and karst solution pipes, colloquially known as the petrified forest, but now known to be hollow tubes of limestone, eroded as a result of millions of years of rainfall. Bridgewater Bay and the adjacent Cape form a partially submerged volcanic caldera. To the west is a large area with huge sand dunes. For these reasons the Cape and the nearby coastal area is classed by the government as the second most important coastline in Victoria, after the 'Twelve Apostles', along the Great Ocean Road

== Wind energy ==
Construction of wind turbines by the company Pacific Hydro were constructed on the cape after some controversy. This is part of the Portland Wind Project

== See also ==
- Great South West Walk
