= Paschendale, Victoria =

Paschendale Victoria
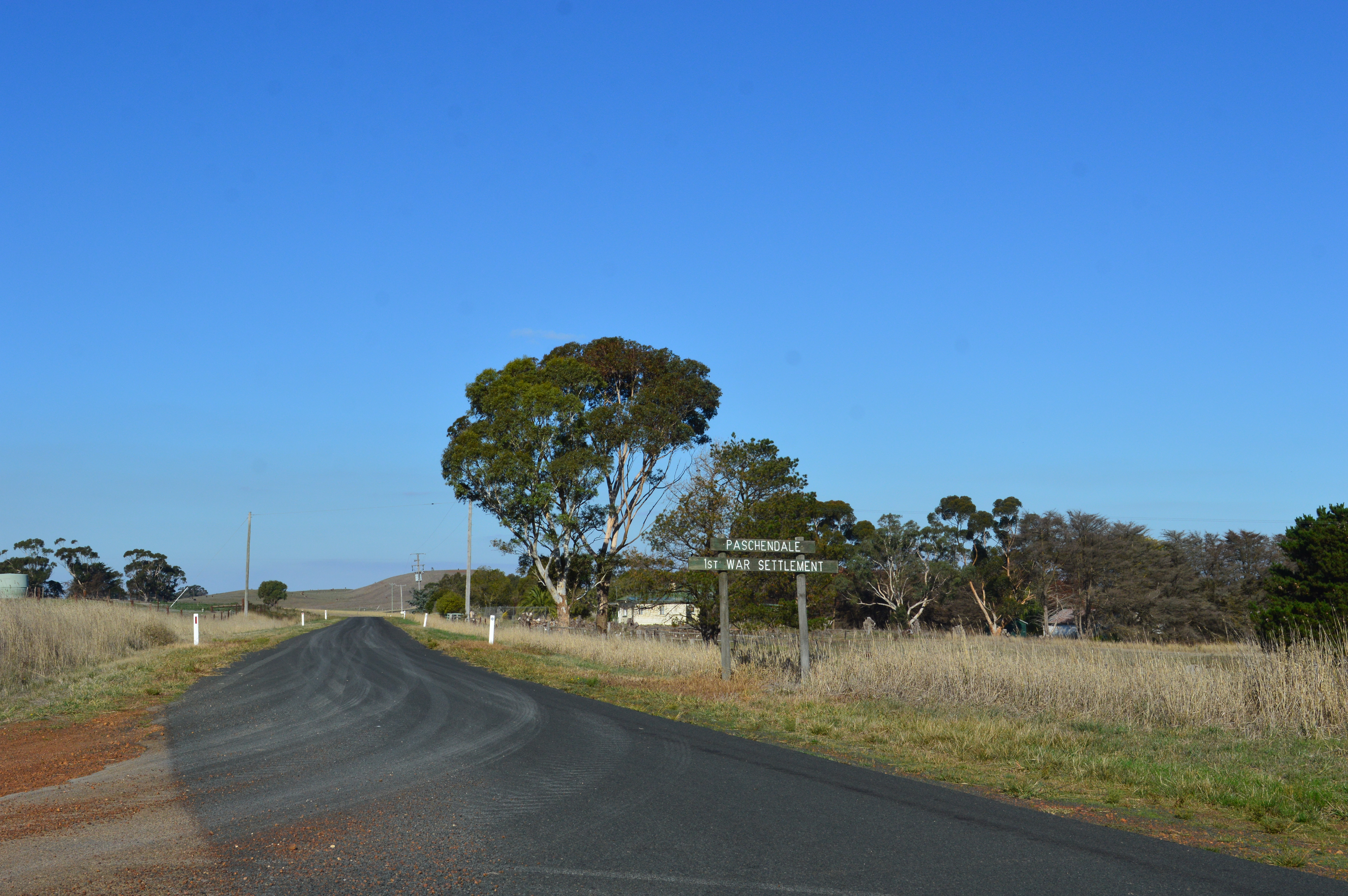
- Entering Paschendale, 2015

- Coordinates: 37°39′6″S 141°34′50″E
- Population: 30 (2016 census)
- Postcode(s): 3315
- Location: 352 km (219 mi) W of Melbourne; 51 km (32 mi) W of Hamilton; 22 km (14 mi) SW of Coleraine; 9 km (6 mi) NE of Merino
- LGA(s): Shire of Glenelg
- State electorate(s): Lowan
- Federal division(s): Wannon

Paschendale is a locality in south west Victoria, Australia. The locality is in the Shire of Glenelg, 352 kilometres (219 mi) west of the state capital, Melbourne.

At the 2016 census, Paschendale had a population of 30.

== Traditional ownership ==
The formally recognised traditional owners of the area on which Paschendale is sited are the Gunditjmara People who are represented by the Gunditj Mirring Traditional Owners Aboriginal Corporation.

== European history ==
In 1841, brothers William and John Robertson, from Inverness-shire, Scotland, occupied land in the area as a pastoral run. The property fronted the Wannon River and the brothers named it "Struan". Their older brother, Angus, took over the running of the property in 1852 after arriving from Scotland with his wife and six children.

In 1919, the Victorian government purchased Struan from its then owner, and the Closer Settlement Board divided it into 39 soldier settlement blocks. The estate had an area of 1,613 acres (653 ha) and was about 5 miles (8 km) north-east of the town of Merino.

The settlement was named Paschendale, after Passchendaele in Belgium, the scene of intense fighting during World War I. The new settlers built a community hall, tennis courts and a church (previously the Henty Anglican Church), and a state school was opened in 1923.
