= Tom Cue =

Australian gold prospector

- Born: Thomas George Cue c. 1850; Casterton, Victoria, Australia
- Died: 4 September 1920 (aged 69–70); Vancouver, British Columbia
- Known for: Gold discoveries in Western Australia

Tom Cue (c.1850 – 1920) was a gold prospector from Western Australia. The town of Cue is named after him for his discovery of gold in its area in 1892.

His best finding was in 1895 in an area he named Woronga, called by others Cue's Patch (referring to the rich patch of shallow alluvial gold there). As there was already a town named after him the town eventually became known as Agnew.
