= Carapook =

Carapook Victoria
- Coordinates: 37°32′15″S 141°30′55″E
- Population: 70 (2016 census)
- Postcode(s): 3312
- LGA(s): Shire of Glenelg
- State electorate(s): Lowan
- Federal division(s): Wannon

Carapook is a locality in the Shire of Glenelg, Victoria, Australia.
