= Bahgallah =

- Town
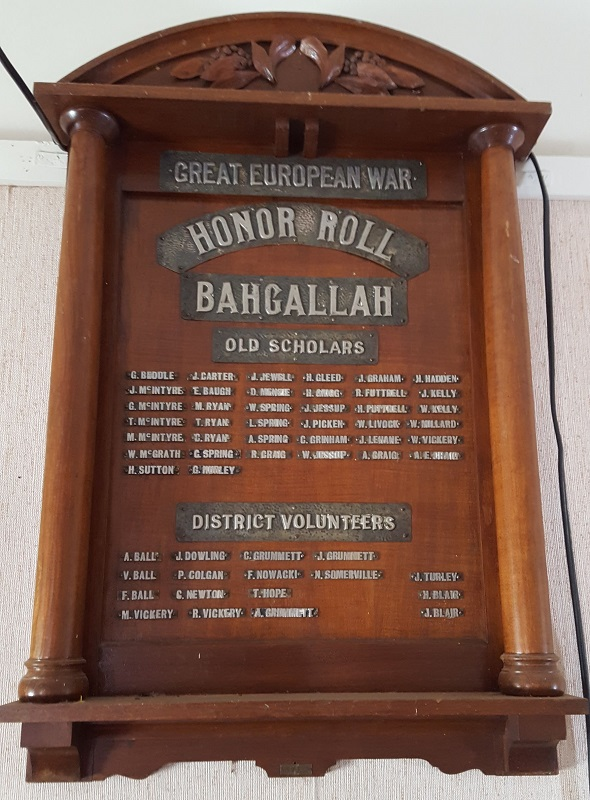

- Coordinates: 37°38′S 141°23′E
- Country: Australia
- State: Victoria
- LGA: Shire of Glenelg

Government
  - State electorate: South-West Coast
  - Federal division: Wannon

Population
  - Total: 35 (2016 census)
- Postcode: 3312

Bahgallah is an isolated farming town in Victoria, Australia. It is located south of the Glenelg Highway. At the 2016 census, Bahgallah recorded a population of 35.

== Traditional ownership ==
The formally recognised traditional owners for the area in which Bahgallah sits are the Gunditjmara people. The Gunditjmara people are represented by the Gunditj Mirring Traditional Owners Aboriginal Corporation.

== Demographics ==
As of the 2016 census, 35 people resided in Bahgallah. The median age of persons in Bahgallah was 54 years. There were more males than females with 57.5% of the population male and 42.5% female. The average household size is 1.7 people per household.

== History ==
A wooden school was built in Bahgallah in 1875. Prior to the school being built few children in the area travelled to denominational schools in Tasmania or attended one of the three schools in Casterton. A proposal was made in 1872 by a local committee to build a school in Bahgallah and in 1875 the school was opened with 20 students. By the end of that year 55 children had enrolled. Until the present day, 35 teachers have taught more than 800 children in this school.

An honor roll board in Balgallah Soldiers Memorial Hall remembers 38 Old Scholars ad 14 District Volunteers who signed up for World War I. Of those, 15 lost their lives in the war.
