= Shire of Glenelg =

Coordinates: 38°00′00″S 141°40′00″E

- Local government area
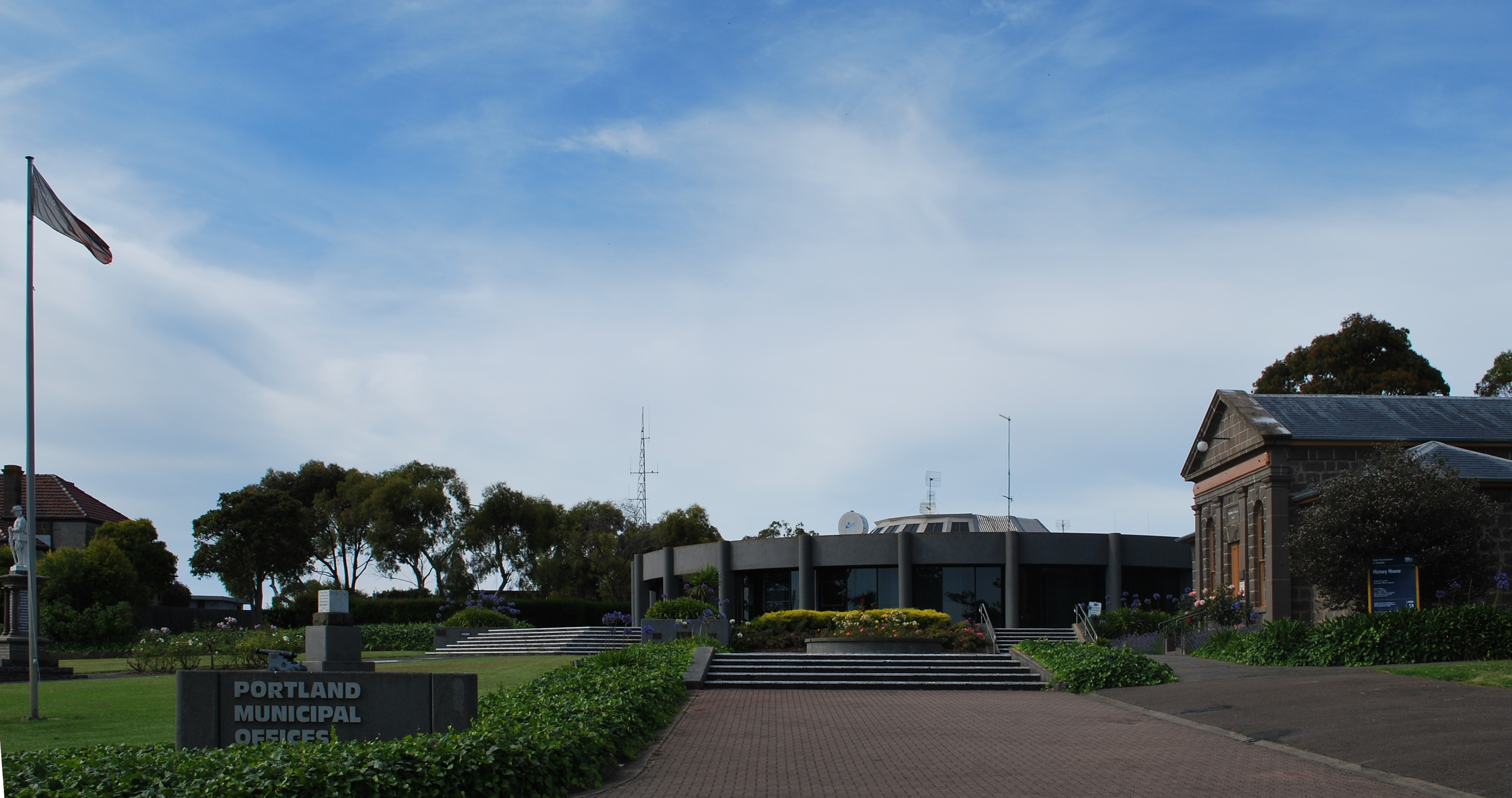
- Municipal offices in Portland Location in Victoria

- Interactive map of Shire of Glenelg
- Country: Australia
- State: Victoria
- Region: Barwon South West
- Established: 1994
- Council seat: Portland

Government
  - Mayor: Cr Karen Stephens
  - State electorates: Lowan; South-West Coast
  - Federal division: Wannon

Area
  - Total: 6,219 km^{2} (2,401 sq mi)

Population
  - Total: 19,665 (2018)
  - Density: 3.1621/km^{2} (8.1898/sq mi)
- Gazetted: 23 September 1994
- Website: Shire of Glenelg
LGAs around Shire of Glenelg
Wattle Range (SA)	West Wimmera	Southern Grampians
Southern Limestone Coast (SA)	Shire of Glenelg	Moyne
Southern Limestone Coast (SA)	Southern Ocean	Southern Ocean

The Shire of Glenelg is a local government area in the Barwon South West region of Victoria, Australia, located in the south-western part of the state. It covers an area of 6,219 square kilometres (2,401 mi^{2}) and in June 2018 had a population of 19,665. It includes the towns of Casterton, Heywood, Merino and Portland.

The Shire is governed and administered by the Glenelg Shire Council; its seat of local government and administrative centre is located at the council headquarters in Portland, it also has service centres located in Casterton and Heywood. The Shire is named after the Glenelg River, a major geographical feature that meanders through the Shire.

Service industries, timber production, grazing and manufacturing are the Shire's main economic activities.

== History ==
The formally recognised traditional owners for the area in which Glenelg Shire sits are the Gunditjmara People who are represented by the Gunditj Mirring Traditional Owners Aboriginal Corporation.

Although a shire of the same name existed before the amalgamations of the mid-1990s, the current Shire was formed in 1994 from the amalgamation of most of the former Shire of Glenelg with the Shire of Heywood and City of Portland.

During the local government review process in 1993 and 1994, all three former municipalities made submissions to the Local Government Board arguing that the City of Portland should continue to stand alone, even if Glenelg and Heywood were to be merged. However, the Board considered that, despite Portland's industrial character, the city's role as a service and export centre gave it a sufficiently strong connection to its rural hinterland, and proposed to merge the three LGAs into a "Shire of Henty". The name "Glenelg" was substituted later.

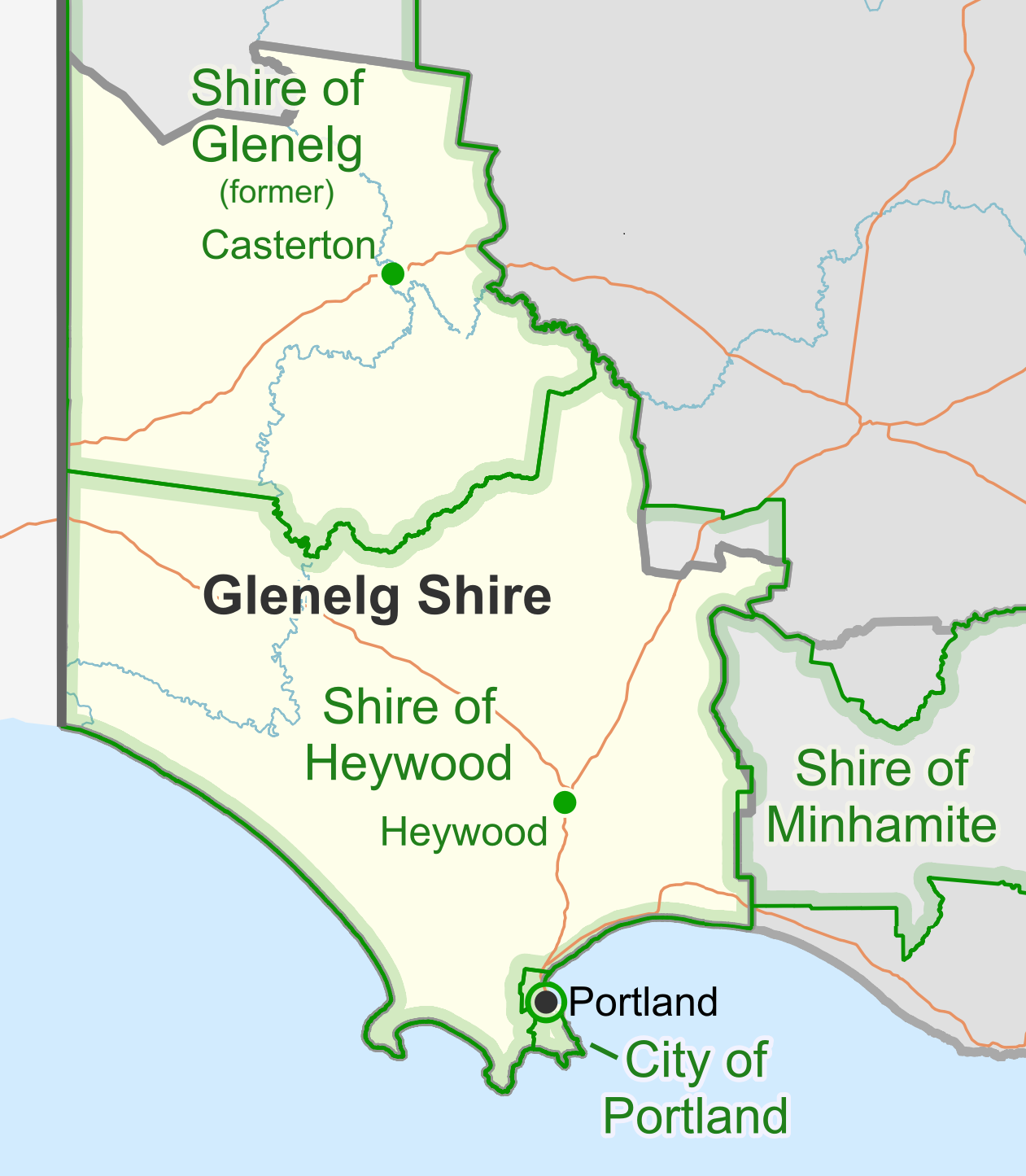
Glenelg Shire's predecessor LGAs (green) as they were in 1994. The administrative centres of the former LGAs are marked by green dots.

== Council ==
=== Current composition ===
The council is composed of seven councillors elected to represent an unsubdivided municipality. The current councillors, in order of election at the 2024 election, are:

Ward	Party	Councilor	Notes
Unsubdivided	Independent	Karen Stephens	Current Mayor.
Unsubdivided	Independent	Michael Carr	
Unsubdivided	Independent	John Pepper	
Unsubdivided	Independent	Mike Noske	
Unsubdivided	Independent	Robyn McDonald	
Unsubdivided	Independent	Matt Jowett	
Unsubdivided	Independent	Dwayne Angelino	

=== 2024 election results ===
2024 Victorian local elections: Glenelg
Party	Candidate	Votes	%	±%
Independent	Karen Stephens (elected 1)	2,008	16.03	+4.14
Independent	Michael Carr (elected 2)	1,969	15.72	+7.91
Independent	John Pepper (elected 3)	1,332	10.63	+10.63
Independent	Mike Noske (elected 4)	1,238	9.88	+9.88
Independent	Robyn McDonald (elected 5)	1,099	8.77	+1.74
Independent	Duane Angelino (elected 7)	851	6.79	+6.79
Independent	Matt Jowett (elected 6)	847	6.76	+6.76
Independent	Mary Picard	714	5.70	+5.70
Independent	Gary Humm	655	5.23	+5.23
Independent	Scott Martin	537	4.29	–6.73
Independent	Trever Boyd	462	3.69	+3.69
Independent	Alistair James McDonald	433	3.46	–0.02
Independent	Andrew Stephenson	383	3.06	+3.06
Total formal votes		12,528	95.14	+0.98
Informal votes		640	4.86	–0.98
Turnout		13,168	83.36	–0.62

=== Administration and governance ===
The council meets in the council chambers at the council headquarters in the Portland Municipal Offices, which is also the location of the council's administrative activities. It also provides customer services at both its administrative centre in Portland, and its service centres in Casterton and Heywood.

== Townships and localities ==
The 2021 census, the shire had a population of 20,152 up from 19,557 in the 2016 census

Population
Locality	2016	2021
Allestree	128	168
Bahgallah	35	56
Bessiebelle^	98	113
Bolwarra	601	647
Branxholme^	351	304
Breakaway Creek^	50	39
Brimboal	4	11
Byaduk^	123	129
Cape Bridgewater	150	151
Carapook^	70	67
Cashmore	228	197
Casterton	1,668	1,673
Chetwynd^	86	85
Clover Flat^	17	15
Condah	121	104
Corndale	33	27
Dartmoor	322	299
Dergholm^	43	57
Digby	124	122
Drik Drik	47	46
Drumborg	152	160
Dunrobin	73	70
Dutton Way	116	91
Gorae	188	236
Gorae West	227	237
Grassdale	18	54
Greenwald	51	58
Heathmere	237	238
Henty	60	75
Heywood	1,726	1,815
Homerton	23	36
Hotspur	45	34
Killara	8	9
Lake Condah^	6	9
Lake Mundi	29	37
Lindsay	7	9
Lyons	29	31
Merino	253	249
Milltown	63	46
Mount Richmond	43	42
Mumbannar	111	100
Muntham^	31	29
Myamyn	73	64
Nangeela	14	17
Nareen^	93	79
Narrawong	387	462
Nelson	190	191
Paschendale	30	33
Portland	9,712	10,016
Portland North	625	708
Portland West	569	619
Sandford	144	130
Strathdownie	183	176
Tahara^	36	30
Tahara Bridge	20	20
Tahara West	21	17
Tyrendarra^	212	198
Wallacedale^	113	94
Wando Bridge	48	41
Wando Vale^	104	96
Warrock	28	46
Winnap	20	14

^ - Territory divided with another LGA

== See also ==
- List of places of worship in Glenelg Shire
- List of localities (Victoria)
