= Hotspur, Victoria =

Hotspur Victoria
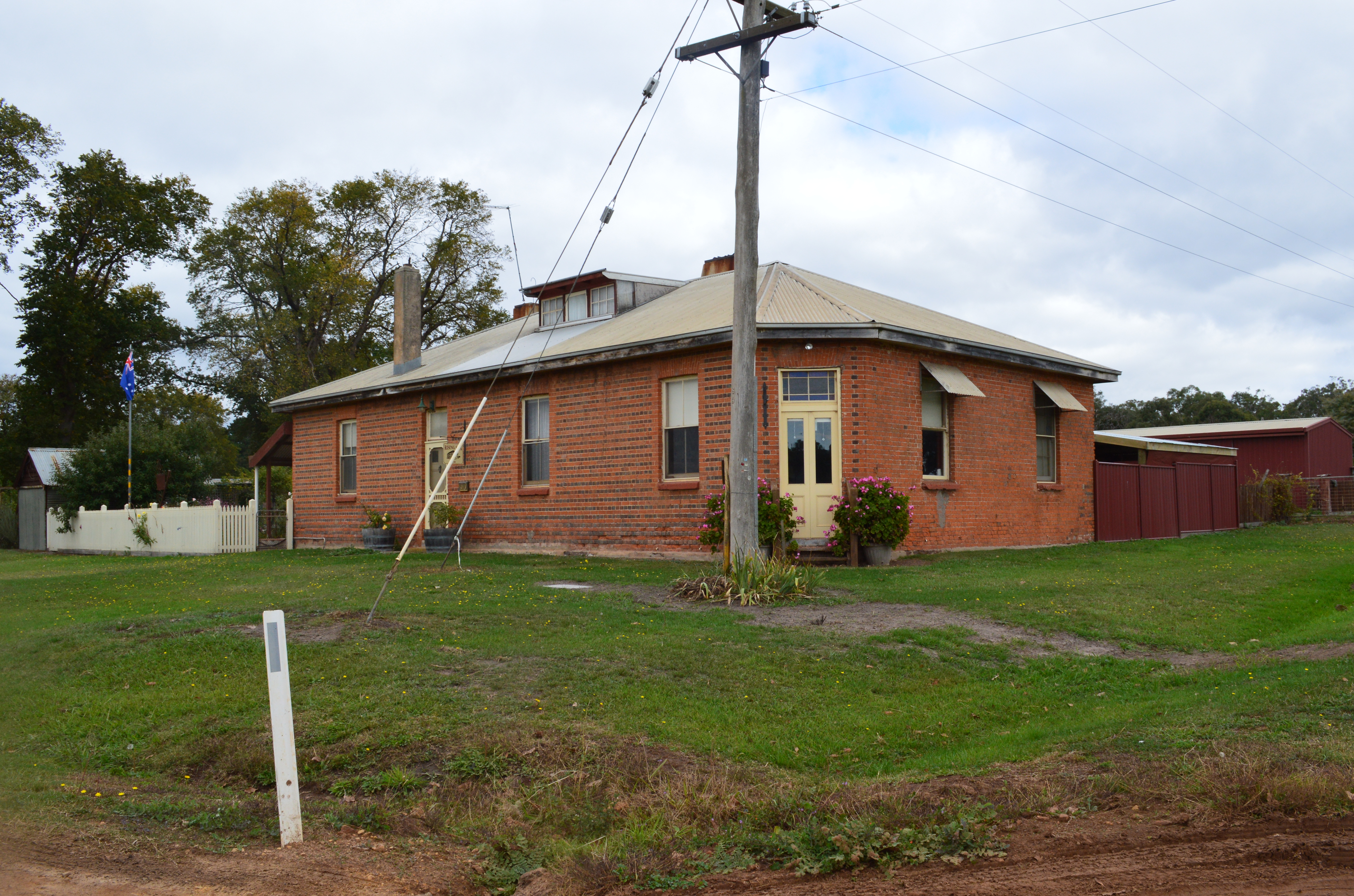
- The former Rising Sun Hotel at Hotspur

- Coordinates: 37°55′34″S 141°33′33″E
- Population: 45 (2016 census)
- Postcode(s): 3303
- Location: 359 km (223 mi) W of Melbourne; 55 km (34 mi) SW of Hamilton; 55 km (34 mi) N of Portland; 27 km (17 mi) N of Heywood
- LGA(s): Shire of Glenelg
- State electorate(s): South-West Coast
- Federal division(s): Wannon

Hotspur is a locality in south west Victoria, Australia. The locality is in the Shire of Glenelg, 359 kilometres (223 mi) west of the state capital, Melbourne.

At the 2016 census, Hotspur had a population of 45.

The former 'Rising Sun Hotel' is heritage listed as it is considered of historical and architectural significance to the Glenelg Shire.

== Traditional ownership ==
The formally recognised traditional owners for the area in which Hotspur sits are the Gunditjmara People who are represented by the Gunditj Mirring Traditional Owners Aboriginal Corporation.
