= Digby, Victoria =

Digby
- Town
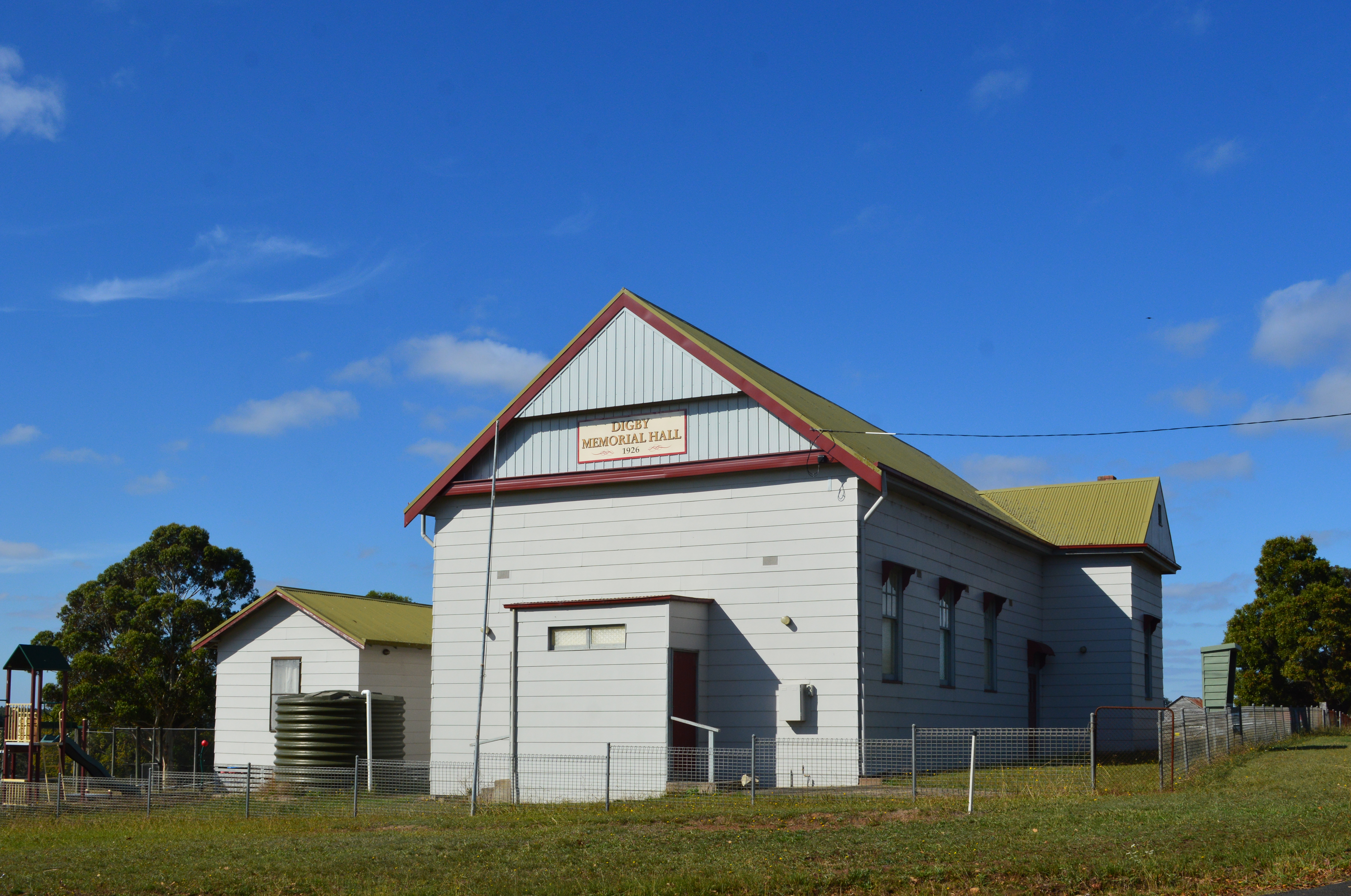
- Memorial hall.

- Coordinates: 37°48′0″S 141°32′0″E
- Country: Australia
- State: Victoria
- LGA: Shire of Glenelg
- Location: 366 km (227 mi) W of Melbourne; 47 km (29 mi) W of Hamilton; 10 km (6.2 mi) S of Merino

Government
  - State electorate: Lowan
  - Federal division: Wannon

Population
  - Total: 124 (2016 census)
- Postcode: 3309

Digby is a town in the Western District of Victoria, Australia. The town is in the Shire of Glenelg, 366 kilometres (227 mi) west of the state capital, Melbourne, on the Stokes River, a tributary of the Glenelg. At the 2006 census, Digby and the surrounding area had a population of 369. The town is believed to be named either after Digby, Lincolnshire, in England, or in honour of a legendary early rural Australian identity, "Digby" McCabe.

The Henty Brothers established the first European settlement in the Digby area in 1837. In 1843, the Woolpack Inn was established near modern Digby; it burnt down in 1887. By 1847 the town consisted of the inn, a blacksmith and a series of huts. The town was officially surveyed in 1852. On 1 June 1858, Digby Post Office opened. In 1857, a second inn—the Digby Hotel—was established. It still exists today, although it was rebuilt after a fire in 1935.

The Digby Mechanics Institute was built in 1868 and has continually operated since. The first sitting of the Supreme Court of Victoria outside Melbourne was in Digby in 1869. By 1874 the town had a post office, two hotels, four shops and a school.

As of 2026, Digby has a post office and a pub. The township relies heavily on the Agriculture industry, with excellent conditions and environment for sheep farming.

== Traditional ownership ==
The formally recognised traditional owners for the area in which Digby sits are the Gunditjmara People who are represented by the Gunditj Mirring Traditional Owners Aboriginal Corporation.
