= City of Portland (Victoria) =

Coordinates: 38°20′S 141°36′E

- Local government area
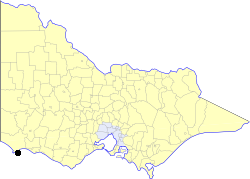
- Location in Victoria

- The City of Portland as at its dissolution in 1994
- Country: Australia
- State: Victoria
- Region: Barwon South West
- Established: 1855
- Council seat: Portland

Area
  - Total: 34.14 km^{2} (13.18 sq mi)

Population
  - Total: 10,760 (1992)
  - Density: 315.17/km^{2} (816.3/sq mi)
- County: Normanby

The City of Portland was a local government area about 360 kilometres (224 mi) west-southwest of Melbourne, the state capital of Victoria, Australia. The city covered an area of 34.14 square kilometres (13.2 sq mi), and existed from 1855 until 1994. Its area was surrounded by the Shire of Heywood, formerly known as the Shire of Portland, and the Southern Ocean.

== History ==
Portland was incorporated as a municipal district on 17 December 1855. It became a borough in 1863, and a town on 19 November 1949. It was proclaimed a city on 28 October 1985.

On 23 September 1994, the City of Portland was abolished, and along with parts of the Shires of Glenelg and Heywood, was merged into the new Shire of Glenelg.

The City of Portland was not subdivided into wards, and the nine councillors represented the entire area.

== Towns and localities ==
- Portland*
- Portland North
- Portland West

* Council seat.

== Population ==
Year	Population
1954	4,759
1958	5,560*
1961	6,014
1966	6,674
1971	8,216
1976	8,298
1981	9,353
1986	10,934
1991	10,115

* Estimate in the 1958 Victorian Year Book.
