= Western Victoria (wine region) =

Coordinates: 37°S 142°E

- Wine region
- Type: Australian geographical indication
- Year established: 1996
- Part of: Victoria
- Sub-regions: Grampians, Henty (wine), Pyrenees

Western Victoria is a wine grape growing zone in the southwestern part of the state of Victoria in Australia. It extends approximately from the South Australia border to Ballarat and from Horsham to the coast. It includes the defined wine regions of Henty, Grampians and Pyrenees as well as areas not in any smaller wine region.
