= Bolwarra, Victoria =

Bolwarra
- Town
- Coordinates: 38°17′S 141°37′E
- Country: Australia
- State: Victoria
- LGA: Shire of Glenelg

Government
  - State electorate: South-West Coast
  - Federal division: Wannon

Population
  - Total: 601 (2016 census)
- Postcode: 3305

Bolwarra is a small town near the coast with a population of 601 as counted at the 2016 Census. The Bolwarra post office opened in 1902 and closed in 1971.
