= Drumborg =

- Town
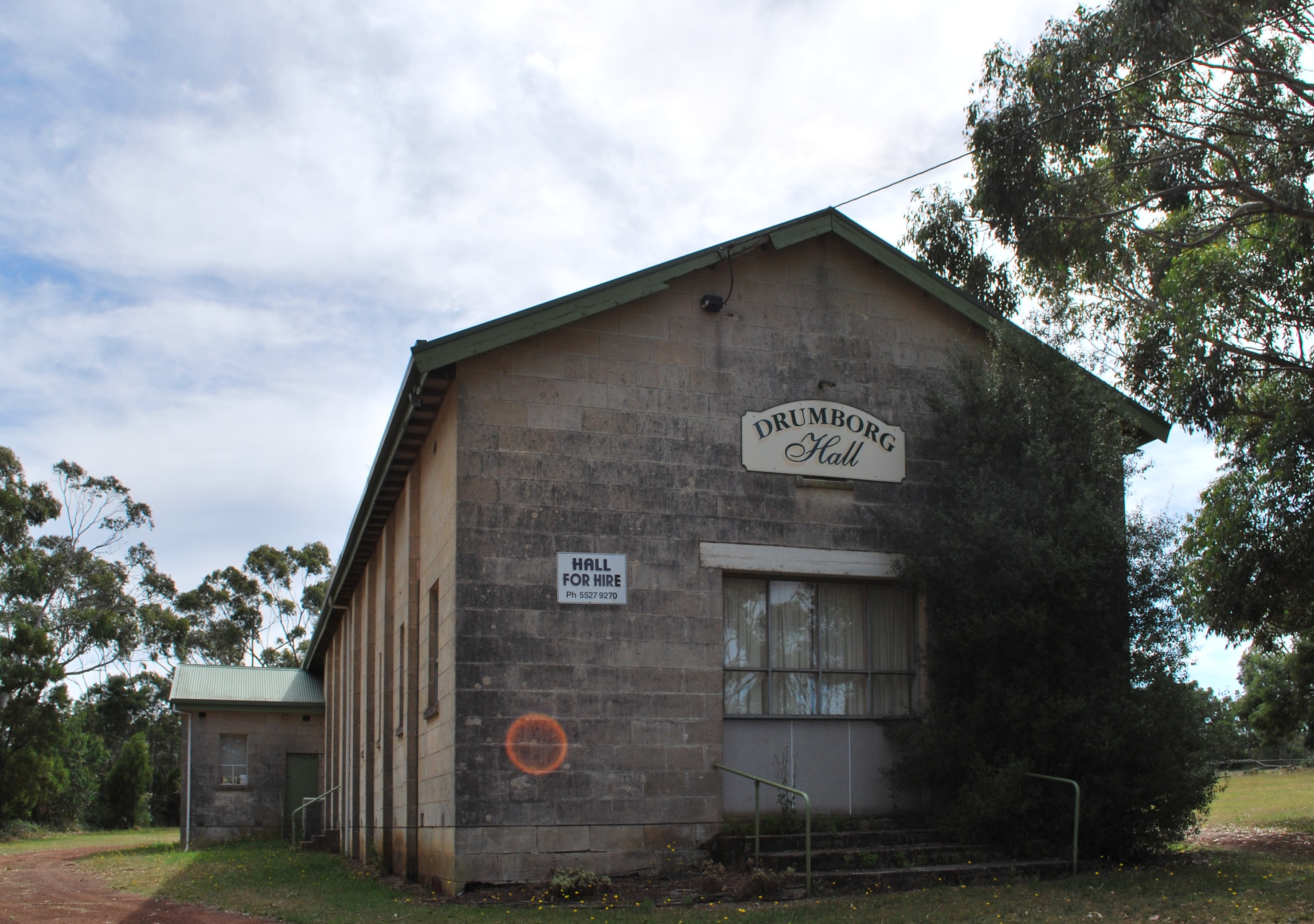
- Drumborg Hall, 2010

- Coordinates: 38°04′35″S 141°35′05″E
- Country: Australia
- State: Victoria
- LGA: Shire of Glenelg
- Location: 342 km (213 mi) W of Melbourne; 38 km (24 mi) N of Portland; 10 km (6.2 mi) NW of Heywood

Government
  - State electorate: South-West Coast
  - Federal division: Wannon

Population
  - Total: 152 (2016 census)
- Postcode: 3304

Drumborg is a locality in south west Victoria, Australia. The locality is in the Shire of Glenelg, 342 kilometres (213 mi) west of the state capital, Melbourne.

At the 2016 census, Drumborg had a population of 152.

== Traditional ownership ==
The formally recognised traditional owners for the area in which Drumborg sits are the Gunditjmara People who are represented by the Gunditj Mirring Traditional Owners Aboriginal Corporation.
