= Breakaway Creek =

- Town
- Coordinates: 38°1′S 141°48′E
- Country: Australia
- State: Victoria
- LGA: Shire of Glenelg

Government
  - State electorate: South-West Coast
  - Federal division: Wannon

Population
  - Total: 39 (2021 census)
- Postcode: 3303

Breakaway Creek is a locality in the Shire of Moyne, Victoria, Australia. At the 2021 census, Breakaway Creek had a population of 39.
