= Sandford, Victoria =

Sandford
- Town
- Coordinates: 37°37′0″S 141°27′0″E
- Country: Australia
- State: Victoria
- LGA(s): Shire of Glenelg

Government
  - State electorate(s): Lowan
  - Federal division(s): Division of Wannon

Population
  - Total(s): 130 (2021 census)
- Postcode: 3312

Sandford (/ˈsændfərd/) is a bounded rural locality of the Shire of Glenelg local government area, Victoria, Australia south of Casterton. At the 2021 census, Sandford had a population of 130.

== History ==
Sandford was settled due to its location on the Wannon River, allowing easy access to fresh water.

Sandford Post Office opened on 12 May 1862 and closed in 1978. It also had a pub which was opened in the late 19th century and closed around 2005.

== Traditional ownership ==
The formally recognised traditional owners for the area in which Sandford sits are the Gunditjmara People who are represented by the Gunditj Mirring Traditional Owners Aboriginal Corporation.

== Today ==
Sandford used to have a football team playing in the South West District Football League. The club merged with nearby Casterton prior to the start of the 2014 season to form the Casterton-Sandford Football Netball Club.

The Sandford Bush Festival est. 2018 is held on the Labour Day Weekend in March and includes Folk, Bluegrass, Aussie Country, Gospel and Celtic music as well as bush dance concerts, poet's breakfasts, jam sessions, walk-ups and workshops.
