= Allestree, Victoria =

Allestree
- Town
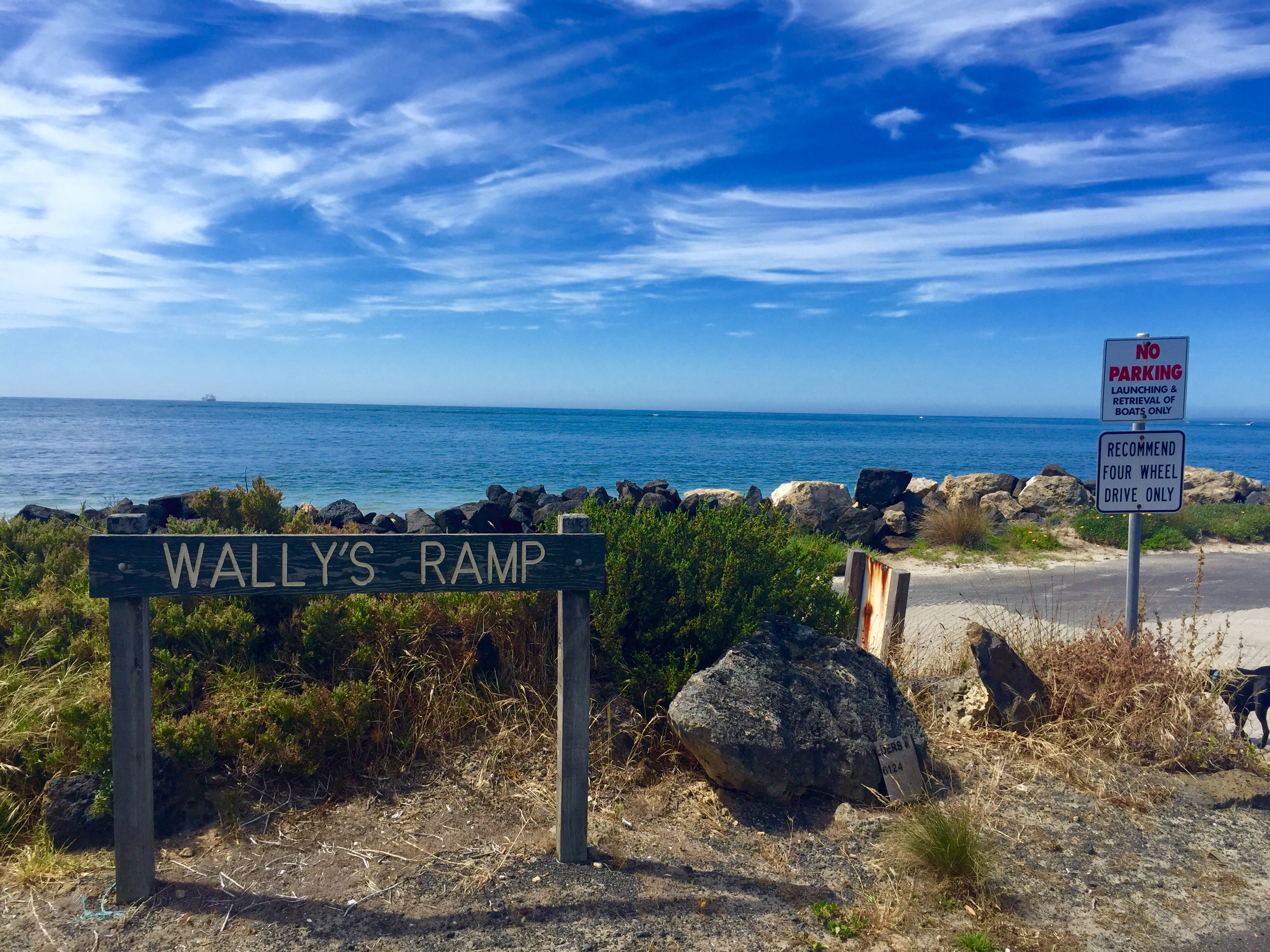

- Coordinates: 38°17′S 141°39′E
- Country: Australia
- State: Victoria
- LGA: Shire of Glenelg
- Location: 352 km (219 mi) WSW of Melbourne; 89 km (55 mi) W of Warrnambool; 14 km (8.7 mi) NE of Portland

Government
  - State electorate: South-West Coast
  - Federal division: Wannon

Population
  - Total: 168 (2021 census)
- Postcode: 3305

Pronounced
(listen)

Allestree /ˈæləztri/ is a locality in Victoria, Australia. It is located along the Princes Highway, north-east of Portland. At the 2021 census, Allestree and the surrounding area recorded a population of 168.

Allestree is named after Allestree in Derbyshire, England. Allestree Post Office opened on 9 August 1907 (replacing nearby Bolwarra) and closed in 1971.

Within the locality of Allestree is the Convincing Ground where a massacre of the local Gunditjmara people took place in around 1833.

The beaches in Allestree have experienced substantial erosion problems since the port breakwater was lengthened many years ago. The shoreline has receded several hundreds of metres and significant coastal property and infrastructure has been lost.

Glenelg Shire Council hosted the world-renowned oceanographer Kerry Black in 2017 as part of a forum to discuss coastal management trends and issues with representatives from across south-west Victoria and south-east South Australia. The one-hour session focused on global strategies to protect beaches from erosion, including a detailed focus on regenerating the beaches along Dutton Way and the Port of Portland. Local residents are hopeful that the Glenelg Shire will help implement Black's recommendations to restore and protect the region's coastlines from the growing threat of climate change.

== Traditional ownership ==
The formally recognised traditional owners for the area in which Allestree sits are the Gunditjmara people. The Gunditjmara people are represented by the Gunditj Mirring Traditional Owners Aboriginal Corporation.

== Demographics ==
As of the 2021 census, 168 people resided in Allestree. The median age of persons in Allestree was 48 years. Children aged 0–14 years made up 17.6% of the population. People over the age of 65 years made up 23.0% of the population. There were slightly more males than females with 52.9% of the population male and 47.1% female. The average household size is 0.8 people per household. The average number of children per family for families with children is 2.

85.7% of people in Allestree were born in Australia. Of all persons living in Allestree, 2.4% (4 persons) were Aboriginal or Torres Strait Islander people. This is higher than for the state of Victoria (1.0%) and lower than the national average (3.2%).

== Gallery ==
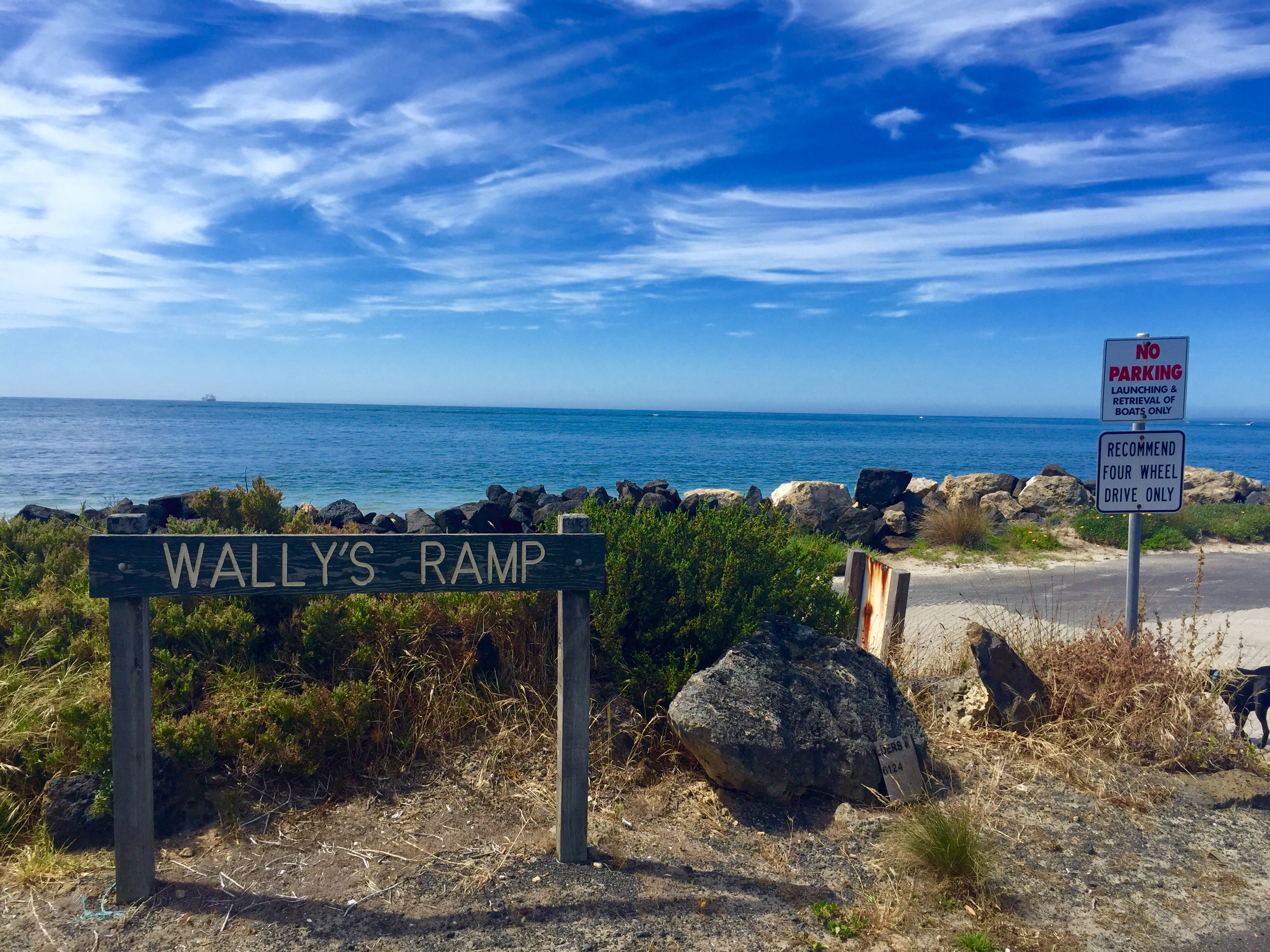
Sand Boat ramp at Allestree

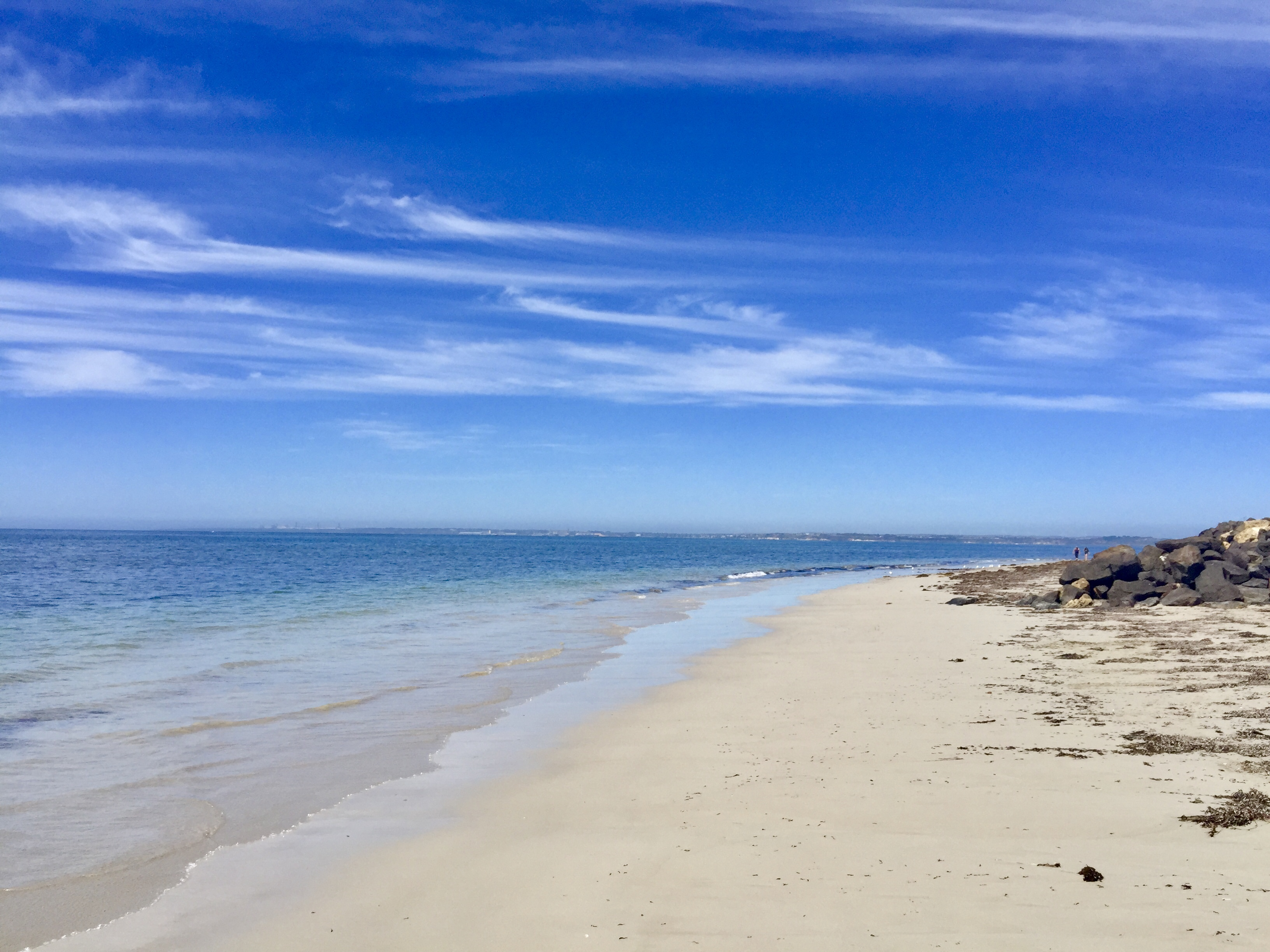
Allestree Beach
