= Heathmere =

Heathmere Victoria
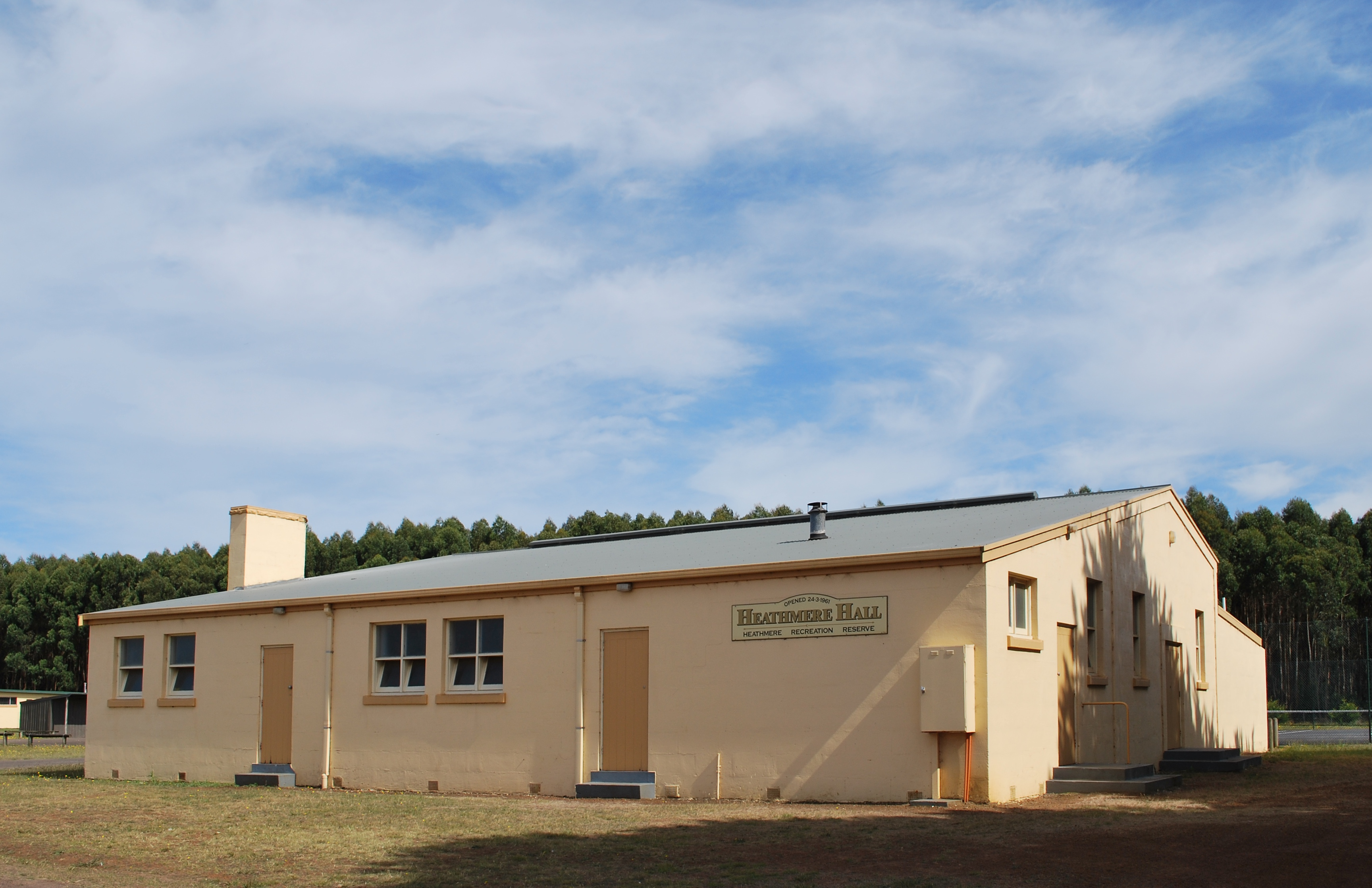
- Heathmere Hall at the Recreation Reserve at Heathmere

- Coordinates: 38°12′50″S 141°34′50″E
- Population: 238 (2021 census)
- Postcode(s): 3305
- Location: 344 km (214 mi) W of Melbourne; 21 km (13 mi) W of Portland
- LGA(s): Shire of Glenelg
- State electorate(s): South West Coast
- Federal division(s): Wannon

Heathmere is a locality in south west Victoria, Australia. The locality is in the Shire of Glenelg, 344 kilometres (214 mi) west of the state capital, Melbourne.

At the 2021 census, Heathmere had a population of 238.

== Traditional ownership ==
The formally recognised traditional owners for the area in which Heathmere sits are the Gunditjmara People who are represented by the Gunditj Mirring Traditional Owners Aboriginal Corporation.
