= Nelson, Victoria =

Nelson Victoria
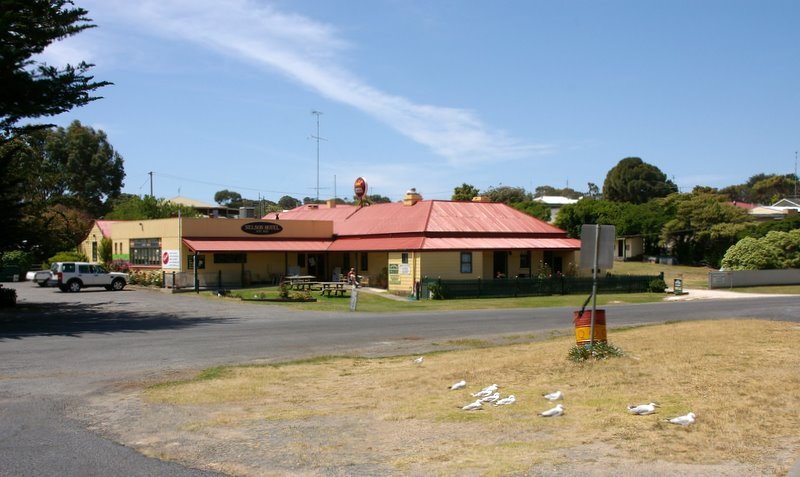
- The town's hotel

- Coordinates: 38°03′0″S 141°01′0″E
- Population: 191 (2021 census)
- Postcode(s): 3292
- Location: 422 km (262 mi) W of Melbourne; 478 km (297 mi) SE of Adelaide; 68 km (42 mi) W of Portland; 36 km (22 mi) E of Mount Gambier
- LGA(s): Shire of Glenelg
- State electorate(s): South-West Coast
- Federal division(s): Wannon
Localities around Nelson:
South Australia	Mumbannar; Drik Drik	Mount Richmond
South Australia	Nelson	Mount Richmond
Ocean	Ocean	Ocean
- Footnotes: Adjoining localities

Nelson is a town in Victoria, Australia. It is located at the mouth of the Glenelg River and Discovery Bay, a few kilometres from the South Australian border, and 422 kilometres (262 mi) west of Melbourne. At the 2021 census, Nelson and the surrounding area had a population of 191.

In January 1852 the name of Nelson was adopted for the settlement, after the ship Lady Nelson, which was used by Lieutenant James Grant in explorations of the area in the early nineteenth century.

A punt was built across the river in 1848 by Henry Kellett. A summerhouse was also built in 1848, which later became the town's current hotel. The town site was surveyed and named in 1852 by Lindsay Clarke, and sheep grazing began soon after. Settlement of the township came much later, a Post Office being opened on 17 March 1876.

The Portland-Nelson Road is the only main road in and out of Nelson and crosses the Glenelg at Nelson, the only crossing for over 25 km. The first crossing over the Glenelg was constructed out of wood in 1893. It was replaced by a steel cantilever bridge in 1963. A second concrete cantilever bridge was added in 1997 on the north side of the steel bridge to cater for the demands of road freight travelling through the town.

== Traditional ownership ==
The formally recognised traditional owners for the area in which Nelson sits are the Gunditjmara People who are represented by the Gunditj Mirring Traditional Owners Aboriginal Corporation.
