= Cashmore, Victoria =

Cashmore
- Town
- Coordinates: 38°19′0″S 141°29′0″E
- Country: Australia
- State: Victoria
- LGA: Shire of Glenelg

Government
  - State electorate: South-West Coast
  - Federal division: Wannon

Population
  - Total: 197 (2021 census)
- Postcode: 3305

Cashmore is a small town west of Portland in southern Victoria, Australia. It had a population of 197 at the 2021 census.
