= Chetwynd, Victoria =

Chetwynd Victoria
- Coordinates: 37°23′S 141°25′E
- Population: 86 (2016 census)
- Postcode(s): 3312
- LGA(s): Shire of Glenelg; West Wimmera Shire
- State electorate(s): South-West Coast
- Federal division(s): Wannon

Chetwynd is a locality near Ganoo Ganoo Bushland Reserve. It is located in the Shire of Glenelg and West Wimmera Shire.
