= Merino, Victoria =

Merino Victoria
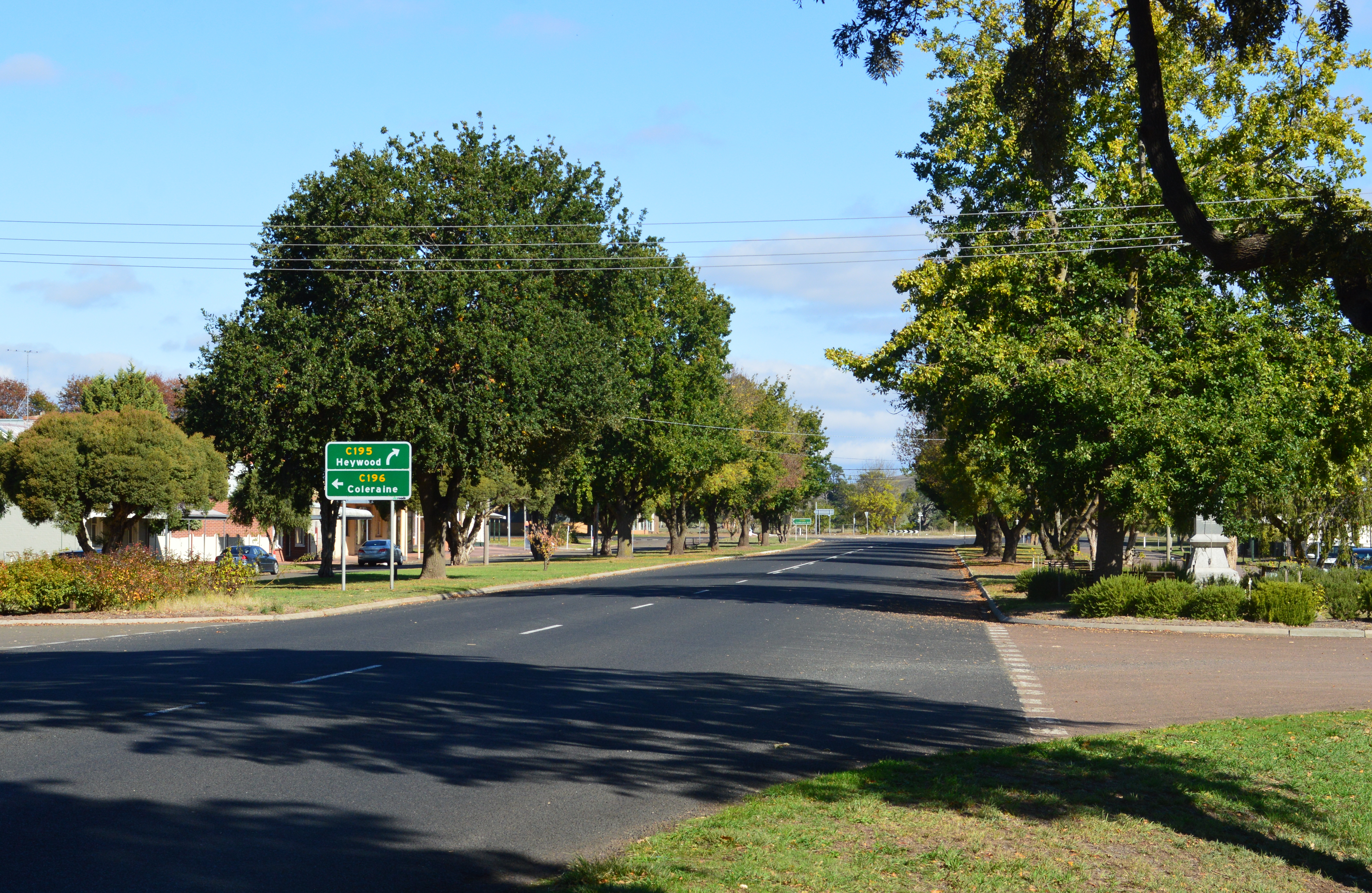
- High Street, Merino, 2015

- Coordinates: 37°43′0″S 141°33′0″E
- Population: 249 (2021 census)
- Postcode(s): 3310
- Location: 342 km (213 mi) W of Melbourne; 226 km (140 mi) W of Ballarat; 48 km (30 mi) W of Hamilton; 77 km (48 mi) N of Portland; 23 km (14 mi) south west of Casterton
- LGA(s): Shire of Glenelg
- State electorate(s): Lowan
- Federal division(s): Wannon

Merino /məˈriːnoʊ/ is a town in the Western District of Victoria, Australia. It is located in the Shire of Glenelg local government area, 363 kilometres west of the state capital, Melbourne. At the 2021 census, Merino had a population of 249.

== Traditional ownership ==
The formally recognised traditional owners for the area in which Merino sits are the Gunditjmara People who are represented by the Gunditj Mirring Traditional Owners Aboriginal Corporation.

== European history ==
The first European settlement of the area was in 1837, when Francis Henty, brother of Edward Henty, established Merino Downs station. Henty established the station after a report on the high quality pasture from the explorer Major Thomas Mitchell, at the Henty property near Portland. A store and post office agency was established in 1854 and the first town lots were sold the next year. An official Post Office opened on 1 June 1858.

The town continued to grow through the 1850s and 1860s with the construction of churches, hotels and schools. In 1870, the courthouse was moved from Digby to Merino. In 1884, Merino railway station was opened, on the 51-kilometre (32 mi)-long branch line from Branxholme, on the Portland railway, to Casterton. The line was closed in 1977. The station building was moved to a property in Carlsruhe, in central Victoria, where it is used as accommodation.

The Merino co-operative butter factory was established around 1885. After both World War I and World War I, parts of the surrounding area was opened up for soldier settlement. In 1955, Merino was connected to the electricity grid.

Merino has a heritage cinema which is housed in the Merino Hotel. Golfers play at the Merino Golf Club on Digby Road.
