= Branxholme, Victoria =

Branxholme
- Town
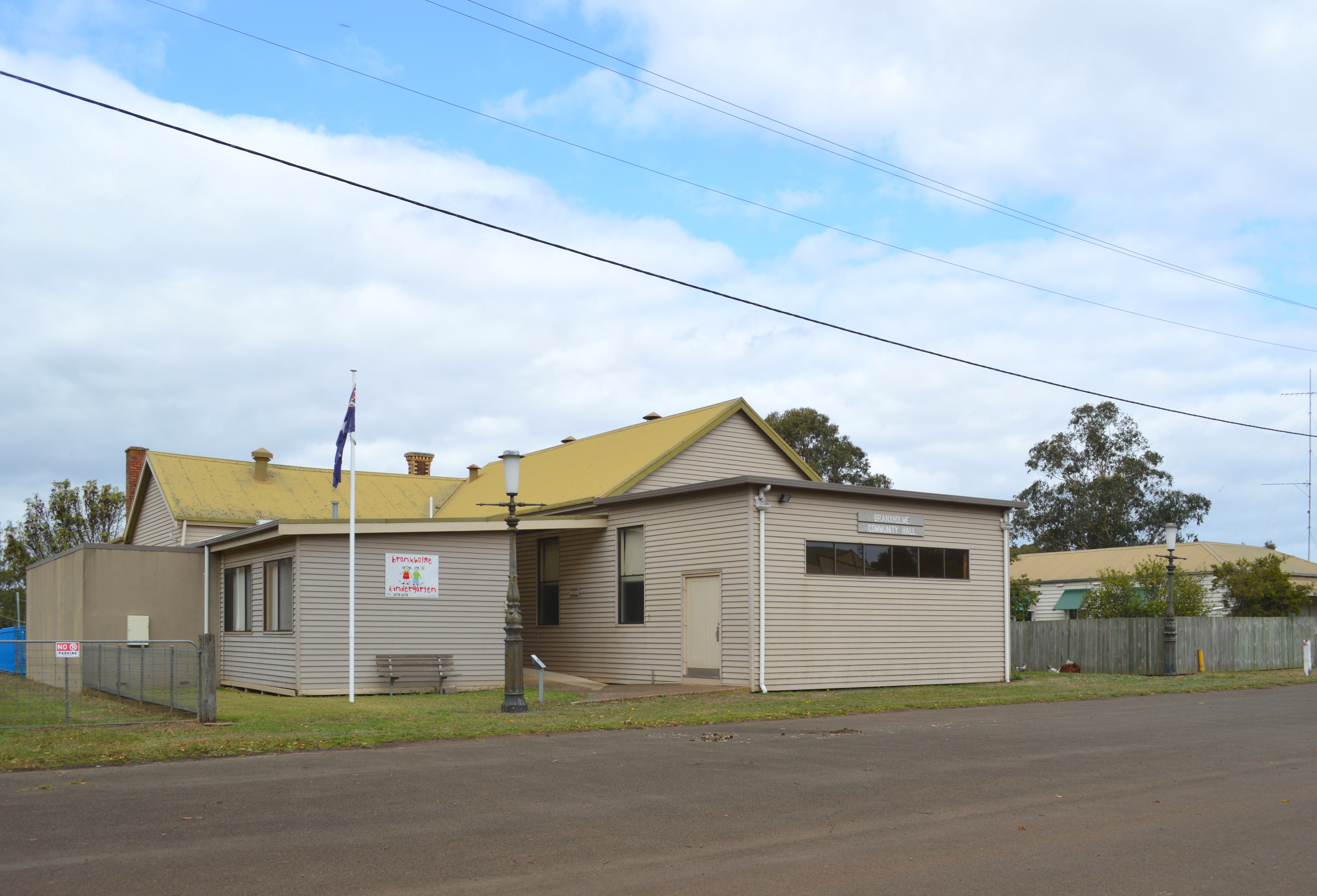
- Community hall

- Coordinates: 37°52′S 141°48′E
- Country: Australia
- State: Victoria
- LGA: Shire of Southern Grampians
- Location: 320 km (200 mi) W of Melbourne; 25 km (16 mi) SW of Hamilton

Government
  - State electorate: Lowan
  - Federal division: Wannon

Population
  - Total: 356 (2021 census)
- Postcode: 3302

Branxholme is a township in the Shire of Southern Grampians in the Western District of Victoria, Australia on the Henty Highway between Heywood and Hamilton. At the 2021 census, Branxholme and the surrounding area had a population of 356.

== History ==
=== Early settlement ===
The traditional owners of the land now known as Branxholme, are the Gunditjmara people. The first non-indigenous settlement of Branxholme was established around 1842 when several pastoral runs were established. As was common across Western Victoria, the initial white settlers were predominantly Scottish. In 1843 the first hotel 'The Travellers Rest' was opened.

=== Birth of the township ===
Branxholme township was formally surveyed in 1852, and the name Branxholme was chosen, in reference to Branxholme, a hamlet in the Scottish Borders region of Scotland.

The township was laid out in a gridded street design, straddling the banks of the Arrandoovong Creek. Several of the streets carry the names of notable and prominent early landowners (Best, McNichol.)

The Branxholme post office was opened on 1 June 1858. The township's first church, Branxholme Presbyterian Church, was opened on Monroe Street in 1862, with the accompanying manse completed shortly after.

=== Heritage listings ===
The township of Branxholme contains a large number of historically significant places, which are recorded on the Victorian Heritage Database as follows:

==== Lynch Street – Former Colonial Bank ====
The former Colonial Bank was the only bank in Branxholme. Unusual in its style, built originally as a house prior to 1870.

==== Branxholme Cemetery, Henty Highway ====
Branxholme Cemetery is located 6 km North of the township, on the Henty Highway. The cemetery is laid out in a conventional manner with graves grouped by denomination, and earliest burials date from the mid 1850s.

==== 98–102 McNichol Street – Mechanic's Institute Hall (Former) ====
The construction of the original building was completed by builder George Foster in 1884. Additional rooms were added to the rear in 1888 and supper room and kitchen were added in 1936.

==== Railway Water Tower, Railway Parade ====
The water tower is located on the western side of Railway Parade as one of the few remaining structures of what was once a substantial complex of railway buildings and sidings.

==== Others ====
6235 Henty Highway – Royston

Monroe Street – State School No.1978

75 Monroe Street – St Andrews Uniting Church (Former Presbyterian Church)

21 Railway Parade – Former Railway Stationmaster's Residence

Branxholme-Byaduk Road – Audley Homestead Complex

Henty Highway – Koornang Homestead Complex

119 Bassett Road – Bassett Homestead Complex and lone grave

1320 Condah-Coleraine Road – Treasland Homestead Complex

5050 Dartmoor-Hamilton Road – Ardachy Homestead Complex

40 Chrome Road – Aarandoovong Homestead Complex

5863 Henty Highway – Brae Park Homestead Complex

2–4 Brown Street – Remnant Garden

44–48 Brown Street – Former Post Office

45–47 Brown Street – Kookaburra Cafe

24–42 Elliot Street – Timber Cottage and Orchard

84–86 McNichol Street – Junction Hotel

91–97 McNichol Street – Prices Bakery, Shop and Residence

94–96 McNichol Street – Coffee Palace (Former)

91 Monroe Street – Free Presbyterian Church

71–73 Monroe Street – St Andrews Presbyterian Manse

63–65 Monroe Street – William Howarth's house

99–101 Monroe Street – Doctor's Residence

== Education ==
Branxholme-Wallacedale Community School operates within the township serving years P-6.

== Sports ==
Branxholme township maintains a recreation reserve containing a football field and netball courts. It has a football team playing in the South West District Football League under the name Branxholme-Wallacedale.

Branxholme recreation reserve also hosts the popular annual Branxholme Community Rodeo.

== Transport ==
Branxholme is on the Portland railway line, and was a junction station for the branch line to Casterton from 1884 to 1977.
