= Dartmoor, Victoria =

Town in Victoria, Australia

Dartmoor
- Town
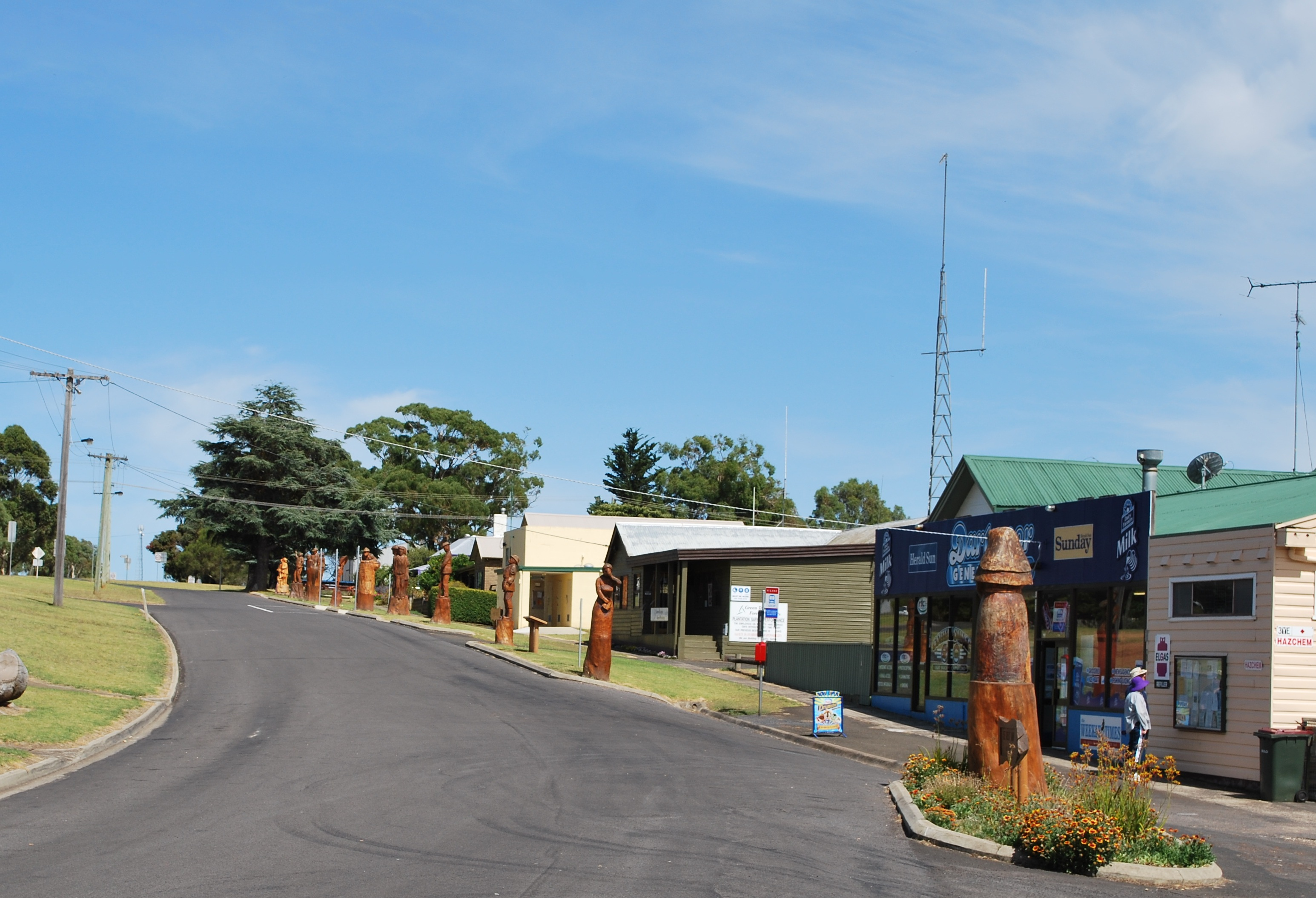
- War memorial sculptures

- Coordinates: 37°56′0″S 141°17′0″E
- Country: Australia
- State: Victoria
- LGA: Shire of Glenelg
- Location: 400 km (250 mi) W of Melbourne; 71 km (44 mi) NW of Portland; 50 km (31 mi) E of Mount Gambier

Government
  - State electorate: Lowan
  - Federal division: Wannon

Population
  - Total: 322 (2016 census)
- Postcode: 3304
- County: Follett

Dartmoor /ˈdɑːtmɔː/ is a town on the Princes Highway and the Glenelg River between Heywood and the South Australian border, in southwestern Victoria. At the 2011 census, Dartmoor had a population of 263.

== History ==
Before the township was established the location was known as Woodford Inn. The township was settled in the late 1850s, a post office opening on 1 April 1860. The town was serviced by the Mount Gambier-Heywood railway line, which ceased operation on 11 April 1995.

== Traditional ownership ==
The formally recognised traditional owners for the area in which Dartmoor sits are the Gunditjmara people. The Gunditjmara people are represented by the Gunditj Mirring Traditional Owners Aboriginal Corporation.

== Demographics ==
As of the 2016 census, 322 people resided in Dartmoor. The median age of persons in Dartmoor was 50 years. Children aged 0–14 years made up 15.0% of the population. People over the age of 65 years made up 24.3% of the population. There were slightly more males than females with 50.6% of the population male and 49.4% female. The average household size is 2.3 people per household. The average number of children per family for families with children is 2.

76.2% of people in Dartmoor were born in Australia. Of all persons living in Dartmoor, 0.9% (3 persons) were Aboriginal and/or Torres Strait Islander people. This is higher than for the state of Victoria (0.8%) and lower than the national average (2.8%). The most common ancestries in Dartmoor were Australian 34.4%, English 27.0%, Scottish 10.7%, Irish 6.4% and German 5.9%.

== Today ==
The main industry in the area is the processing of timber from the extensive pine plantations.

Dartmoor has a football team playing in the South West District Football League.

Golfers play at the Dartmoor Golf Club on Wapling Avenue.

== Notable residents ==
- Jeremy Cameron, Australian rules footballer
