= Gorae West =

Gorae West Victoria
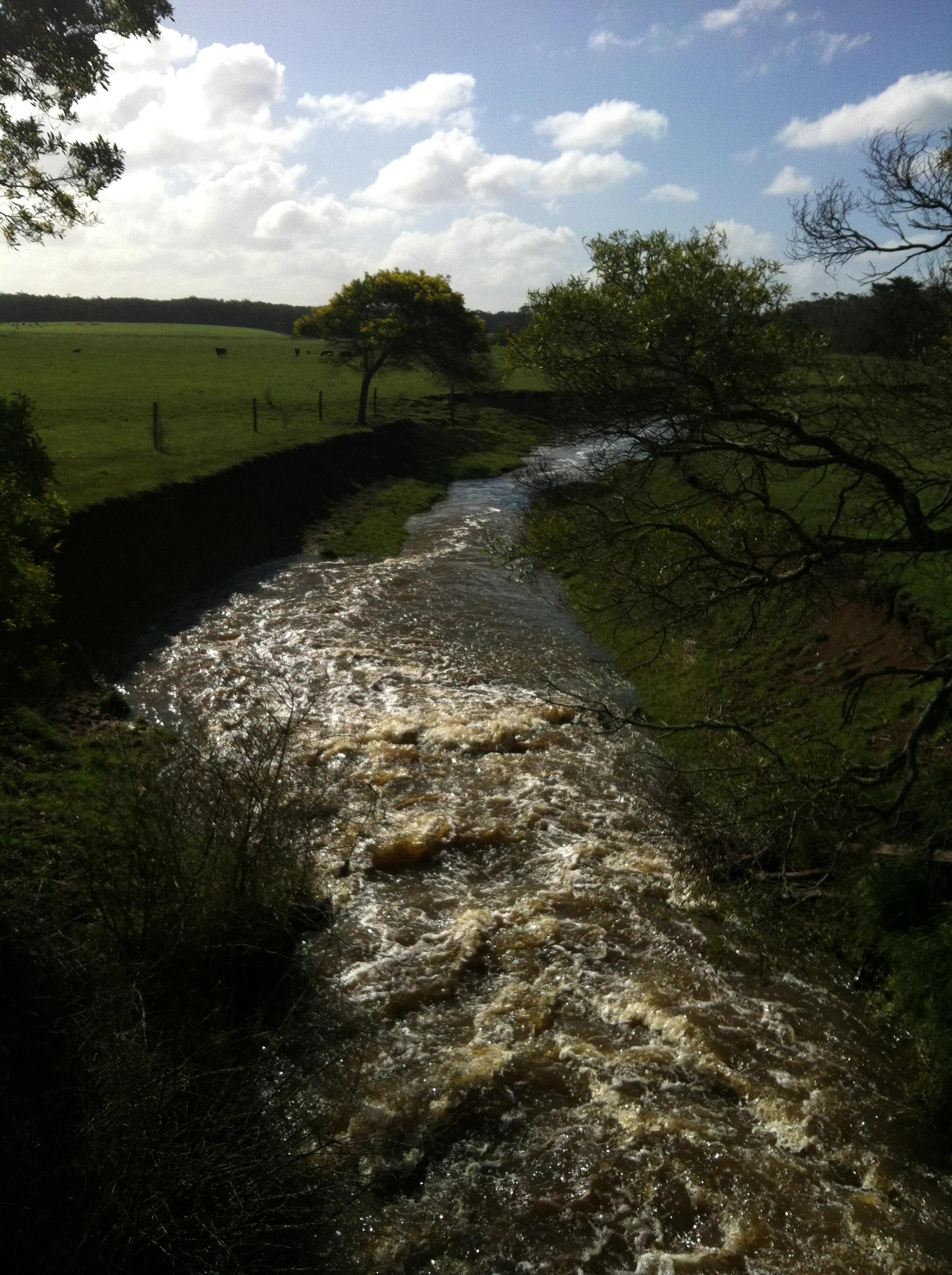
- Mount Kincaid Creek at Gorae West

- Coordinates: 38°14′40″S 141°27′00″E
- Population: 237 (2021 census)
- Postcode(s): 3305
- Location: 365 km (227 mi) W of Melbourne; 25 km (16 mi) NW of Portland
- LGA(s): Shire of Glenelg
- State electorate(s): South-West Coast
- Federal division(s): Wannon

Gorae West is a locality in south west Victoria, Australia. The locality is in the Shire of Glenelg, 352 kilometres (219 mi) west of the state capital, Melbourne.

At the 2021 census, Gorae West had a population of 237.

== Traditional ownership ==
The formally recognised traditional owners for the area in which Gorae West sits are the Gunditjmara People who are represented by the Gunditj Mirring Traditional Owners Aboriginal Corporation.
