= Henty Brothers =

Australian family

The Henty brothers were a family of seven brothers, sons of Thomas Henty and Frances Elizabeth née Hopkins, who are generally considered to be the first Europeans to establish a permanent agricultural settlement in Victoria, Australia. The brothers were:

- James (1800–1882), founded James Henty and Company, merchants. He married Charlotte Carter.

- Henry (1833–1912), took over his father's company, inherited uncle Francis's fortune
- Herbert James (1834–1902), squandered the family fortune in his brother's absence
- Thomas (1836–1887), grazier and, briefly, MLC for Southern Province
  - a grandson Sir Denham (1903–1978), Senator for Tasmania;
- Frances Charlotte (1838–1925) who married James Balfour, a member of the Victorian Legislative Assembly and Legislative Council.

- Charles (1807–1864), banker and member of the Tasmanian House of Assembly
- William (1808–1881), solicitor, member of the Tasmanian Legislative Council for Tamar, and colonial secretary in the Weston cabinet
- Edward (1810–1878), pioneer, first permanent land based settler in Victoria, Australia taking up property in 1834.
- Stephen George (1811–1872), member of the legislative council of Victoria, 1856–1870
  - Richmond (1837–1904), author
  - Walter Thomas (1856–1917), farmer at Hamilton
- John (1813–1869), pastoralist in Victoria
- Francis (1815–1889), farmer and grazier

== See also ==
- Political families of Australia
