= Casterton, Victoria =

Casterton
- Town
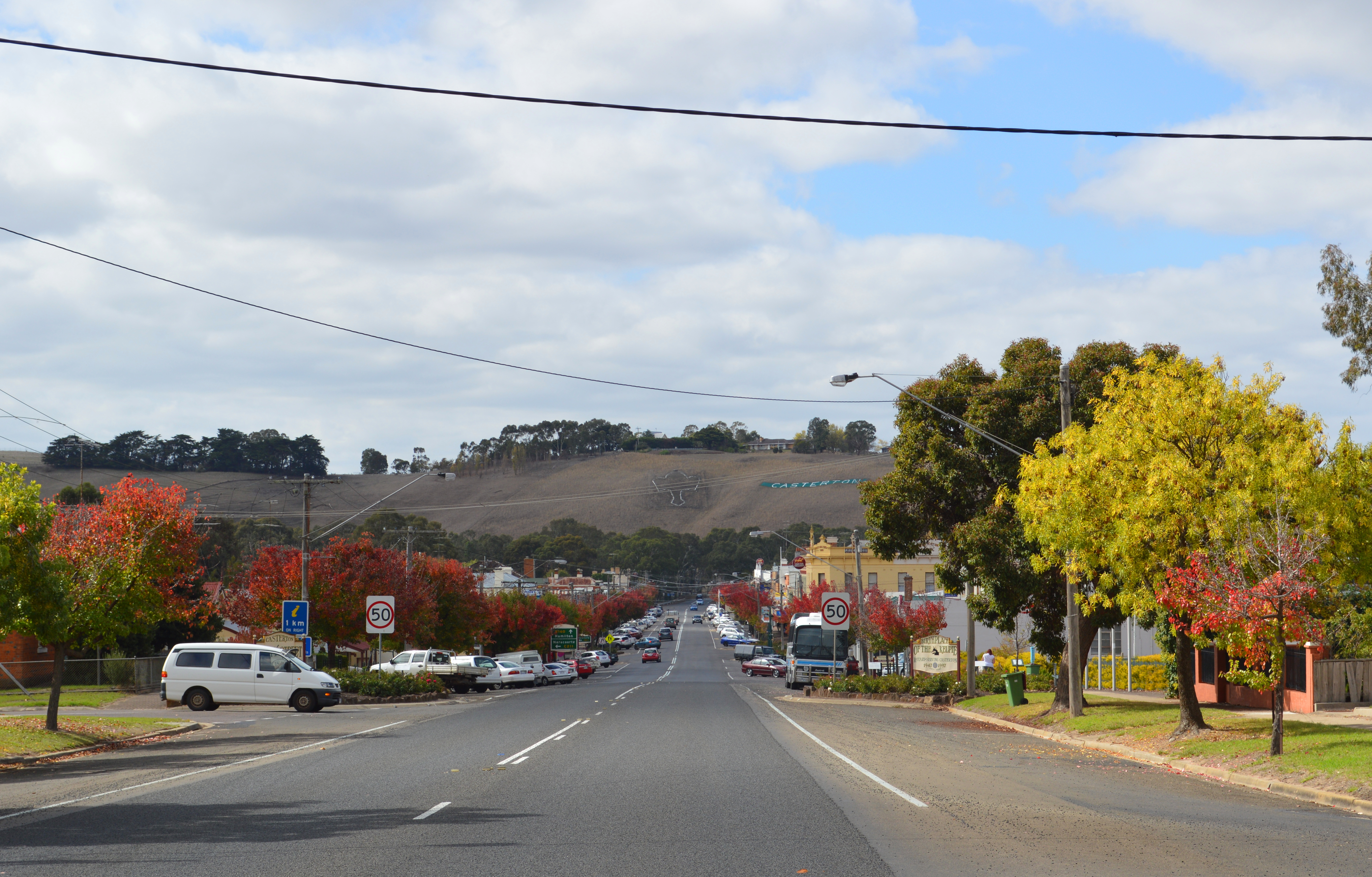
- Henty Street (Glenelg Highway), the main street of Casterton, in autumn. Note the Fleur-de-Lis and the name of the town carved into the hill in the background.

- Coordinates: 37°35′0″S 141°24′0″E
- Country: Australia
- State: Victoria
- LGA: Shire of Glenelg
- Location: 359 km (223 mi) from Melbourne; 103 km (64 mi) from Portland; 69 km (43 mi) from Mount Gambier
- Established: 1846

Government
  - State electorate: Lowan
  - Federal division: Division of Wannon
- Elevation: 73 m (240 ft)

Population
  - Total: 1,673 (2021 census)
- Postcode: 3311
- Mean max temp: 19.9 °C (67.8 °F)
- Mean min temp: 8.3 °C (46.9 °F)
- Annual rainfall: 660.4 mm (26.00 in)

Casterton /ˈkɑːstərtən, ˈkæs-/ is a town in Victoria, Australia, located on the Glenelg Highway, 42 kilometres east of the South Australian border, in the Shire of Glenelg. The Glenelg River passes through the town. Casterton is named after the village of Casterton in south-east Cumbria in England.

== History ==
Prior to white settlement, Aboriginal people of the Konongwootong Gundidj clan lived in the local area. The first white explorers to pass through the area were the expedition led by Major Thomas Mitchell in 1836 who spoke enthusiastically of the landscape's green hills, soft soils and flowery plains, describing it as ideal for farming and settlement, naming it Australia Felix. The first white settlers in the area were the Henty brothers, who had landed in Portland, Victoria in 1834 and who claimed 28,000 hectares between what are now the towns of Casterton and Coleraine. 'Warrock' Station, a sheep farming settlement, was established in 1841, 26 km north of what would be Casterton.

The township of Casterton began on the crossing site of the Glenelg River, the location having been surveyed in 1840, and the first pub, the Glenelg Inn, was established in 1846, with a post office opening the following year. The early history of the region was marred by violent clashes between settlers and Indigenous people, including multiple murders of Aboriginals that took place near Casterton in the late 1830s and early 1840s.

In 1891, a large number of Casterton women signed the Victorian Women's Suffrage Petition to be tabled in the Victorian Parliament to grant women the right to vote (which was not allowed until 1908). By the 1890s, increasing soil erosion saw wheat-farming around Casterton begin to decline, and it was largely replaced by meat, wool and dairy farming. Casterton's population expanded in the early 20th century, especially in the 1920s with the arrival of large numbers of soldier-settler farmers and during the post-war era in the 1950s.

The Rail line to Casterton was closed on 12 September 1977.

The town's population began to decline in the 1990s, which was consistent with the statewide trend of decreasing populations in many rural areas and the ageing of the local population. As of the 2021 census, the town had a population of 1,673 with the average age being 58.

== Traditional ownership ==
The formally recognised traditional owners for the area in which Casterton sits are the Gunditjmara People who are represented by the Gunditj Mirring Traditional Owners Aboriginal Corporation.

== Timeline ==
- 1840 Location of Casterton is first surveyed
- 1846–1847 Opening of Casterton's first pub and post office
- 1855 First Horse Racing Meet held in Casterton
- 1870 The local newspaper-The Casterton News-is first published
- 1875 Casterton Football Club is founded
- 1884 A railway link from Branxholme, Victoria to Casterton is established.
- 1908 Establishment of Casterton Hospital
- 1936 Official Opening of Casterton Town Hall
- 1955 Casterton Elementary High School is built on the current site (now Casterton Secondary College)
- 1977 Railway closed.

== The kelpie ==
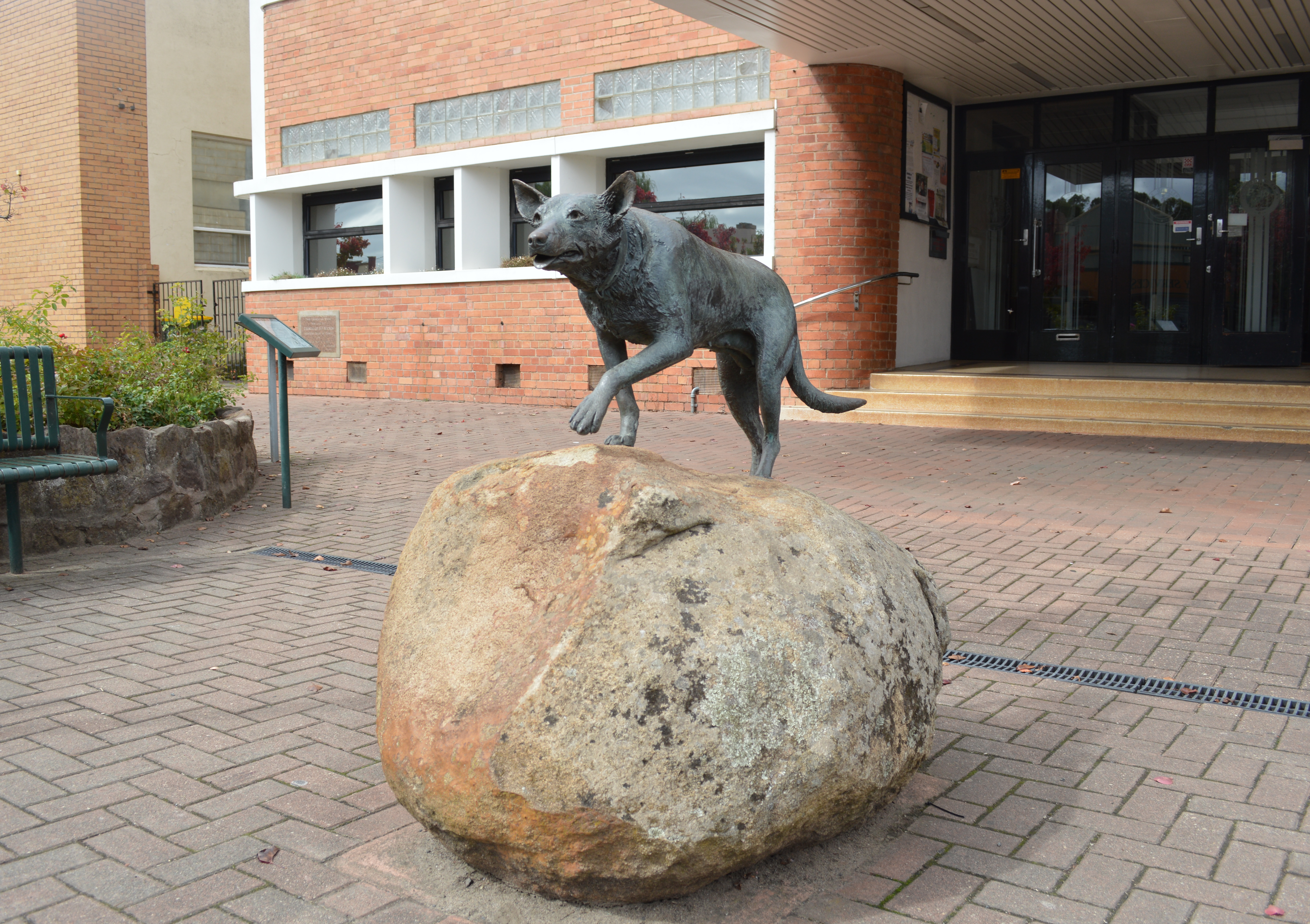
Casterton Kelpie Monument

Casterton lays claim to be the birthplace of the breed of working dog known as the kelpie, a Scottish term meaning 'Water Sprite' and a name given to a black and tan bitch British working collie owned by Scotsman George Patterson, a farmer who lived north of Casterton in the 1870s. Patterson exchanged 'Kelpie' for a horse, and the dog's new owner, a drover named Jack Gleeson, took her to Ardlethan, NSW, where she mated with a black male Rutherford Sheepdog named 'Moss', producing several litters. Kelpie later mated with another male named 'Caesar', producing a female pup named 'King's Kelpie,' which grew to become a champion sheepdog.

The breed was further developed and refined during the next few decades. Ardlethan also lays claim to be the birthplace of the breed.

In 1997, a working dog auction was held in Casterton, an annual event which grew to become the Casterton Kelpie Festival in 2001. The auction and festival event is now held each June in Casterton.

To mark Casterton's 150th anniversary celebrations in 1996, a bronze sculpture of a kelpie by artist Peter Corlett was unveiled in front of Casterton's Town Hall.

== The Fleur de Lys ==
A large version of the Fleur de Lys, used as the emblem of the Scouts, is carved into Toorak Hill, a steep hill overlooking the eastern end of Casterton's main thoroughfare. The design has a circumference of 91 metres. In 1935, the Boy Scouts and Cubs, in honour of the Silver Jubilee Celebrations of King George V, carved a large-scale version of the words 'The King' into the hill, each letter some six metres long. Encouraged by the success of this, the Scouts, to celebrate the 1941 opening of the town's new Scout-hall, carved the Fleur de Lys emblem into the hill and lit it up at night with the aid of a series of tins filled with oil-soaked rags which were set alight. Years later, the design was lit by electric strip lighting and is illuminated on most evenings throughout the year.

== Community ==
The town has a Community Centre, a weekly local newspaper, and hosts many activities throughout the year.

The town has an Australian Rules football team competing in the Western Border Football League. Casterton Football Club, originally formed in 1875, won the Western District League Premiership 12 times between 1892 and 1963 and has won the Western Border League Premiership twice, in 1969 and 1990.

The Casterton Racing Club schedules around four horse race meetings a year, including the Casterton Cup meeting in May or June.

Golfers play at the Casterton Golf Club on Penola Road.

The town has a public outdoor swimming pool, a hospital, a secondary college and State and Catholic primary schools.

== Notable residents ==
Notable residents of Casterton include:

- William Macmahon Ball (diplomat, radio announcer & academic)
- Clarice Beckett (painter was born in the Australasian Bank)
- Thomas George Cue (gold prospector whom the town of Cue, WA was named after)
- Barry Gill (Australian Rules football player)
- John Gill (Australian Rules football player)
- Dame Mary Gilmore (writer, political activist & journalist)
- Murray Matheson (actor)
- Percy Meldrum (architect)
- Kathryn Mitchell (athlete)
- Alan Richardson (Australian Rules football player)
- Max Rooke (Australian Rules football player).

== Climate ==
Climate data for Casterton, elevation 71 m (233 ft), (1981–2010 normals, extremes 1957–2011)
Month	Jan	Feb	Mar	Apr	May	Jun	Jul	Aug	Sep	Oct	Nov	Dec	Year
Record high °C (°F)	44.3 (111.7)	43.7 (110.7)	40.4 (104.7)	35.0 (95.0)	27.8 (82.0)	22.8 (73.0)	22.5 (72.5)	25.0 (77.0)	32.1 (89.8)	35.2 (95.4)	40.0 (104.0)	43.0 (109.4)	44.3 (111.7)
Mean daily maximum °C (°F)	27.2 (81.0)	27.7 (81.9)	24.6 (76.3)	20.5 (68.9)	16.9 (62.4)	14.1 (57.4)	13.5 (56.3)	14.7 (58.5)	16.4 (61.5)	19.1 (66.4)	22.2 (72.0)	24.7 (76.5)	20.1 (68.2)
Mean daily minimum °C (°F)	12.0 (53.6)	12.2 (54.0)	10.7 (51.3)	8.4 (47.1)	6.8 (44.2)	5.5 (41.9)	4.9 (40.8)	5.5 (41.9)	6.5 (43.7)	7.1 (44.8)	8.9 (48.0)	10.3 (50.5)	8.2 (46.8)
Record low °C (°F)	2.6 (36.7)	1.8 (35.2)	1.5 (34.7)	−2.4 (27.7)	−1.8 (28.8)	−4.0 (24.8)	−4.6 (23.7)	−3.5 (25.7)	−2.0 (28.4)	−1.7 (28.9)	−0.8 (30.6)	0.4 (32.7)	−4.6 (23.7)
Average rainfall mm (inches)	33.0 (1.30)	21.8 (0.86)	38.3 (1.51)	39.3 (1.55)	56.8 (2.24)	74.5 (2.93)	81.4 (3.20)	86.6 (3.41)	70.7 (2.78)	54.2 (2.13)	44.0 (1.73)	44.5 (1.75)	644.8 (25.39)
Average rainy days (≥ 1.0 mm)	4.9	3.0	5.3	6.9	9.7	13.2	14.4	15.4	12.9	10.0	7.2	7.0	109.9
Source: Australian Bureau of Meteorology
