= Heywood, Victoria =

Heywood
- Town
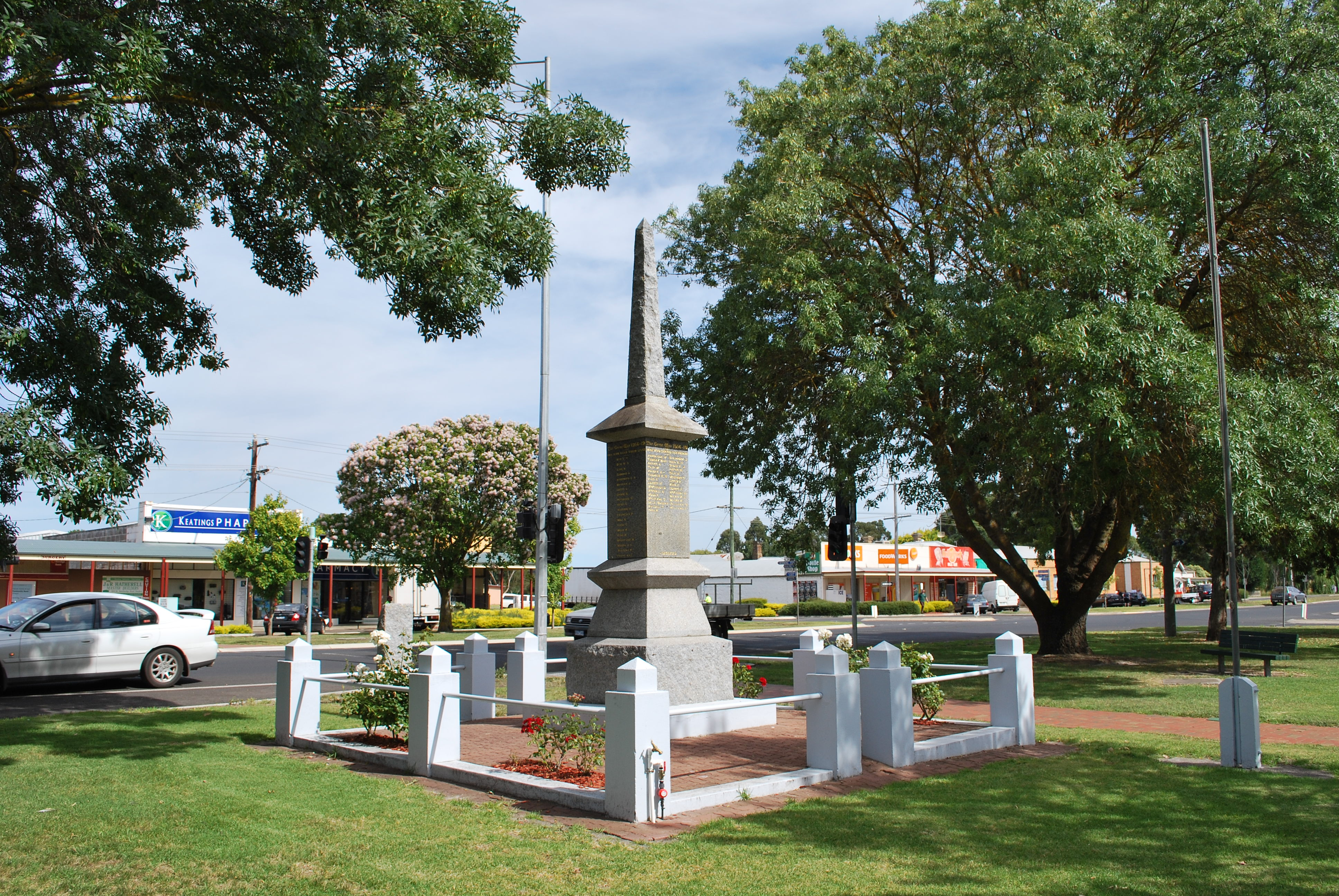
- War memorial at Heywood

- Coordinates: 38°08′0″S 141°37′0″E
- Country: Australia
- State: Victoria
- LGA: Shire of Glenelg
- Location: 357 km (222 mi) W of Melbourne; 27 km (17 mi) N of Portland

Government
  - State electorate: South-West Coast
  - Federal division: Wannon
- Elevation: 27 m (89 ft)

Population
  - Total: 1,815 (2021 census)
- Postcode: 3304
- Mean max temp: 19.2 °C (66.6 °F)
- Mean min temp: 8.0 °C (46.4 °F)
- Annual rainfall: 804.6 mm (31.68 in)

Heywood (/ˈheɪwʊd/ HAY-wuud) is a town on the Fitzroy River in the Australian state of Victoria. It is situated at an elevation of 27 metres amidst rolling green hills in an agricultural, pastoral and timbercutting district. Heywood is 357 kilometres (222 mi) west of Melbourne at the intersection of the Princes and Henty Highways and 27 kilometres (17 mi) north of Portland. It is on the railway line to Portland, at the junction of the presently-unused branch to Mount Gambier, South Australia. The winner of several past "Tidy Town" awards, it is often referred to as the "Jewel of the Southwest".

== History ==
Prior to European settlement the area was occupied by the Gunditjmara Aborigines. David Edgar built the Bush Tavern on the townsite in 1842 and a settlement emerged. Formerly known as Fitzroy Crossing it became known as Edgar's. The township was surveyed in 1852 by Lindsay Clarke who named it after Heywood, Lancashire in England. The first town allotments were sold in 1854 and a Post Office opened on 8 August 1857.

Heywood has won many Tidy Town awards.

== Traditional ownership ==
The formally recognised traditional owners for the area in which Heywood sits are the Gunditjmara People who are represented by the Gunditj Mirring Traditional Owners Aboriginal Corporation.

== Demographics ==
At the 2021 census, Heywood had a population of 1,815.

== Sport ==
The town has an Australian rules football team, the Heywood Lions, which until 2011 competed in the Western Border Football League. In 2012 it transferred to the lower grade South West District Football League. Essendon midfielder Nathan Lovett-Murray, played for the Lions in his junior career.

Golfers play at the course of the Heywood Golf Club on Golf Club Road.

== Climate ==
Heywood has a Mediterranean influenced oceanic climate with mildly warm, dry summers and cool, very wet winters.

Climate data for Heywood, Victoria (1981–2009 normals, extremes 1965–2009)
Month	Jan	Feb	Mar	Apr	May	Jun	Jul	Aug	Sep	Oct	Nov	Dec	Year
Record high °C (°F)	43.2 (109.8)	43.4 (110.1)	41.0 (105.8)	35.0 (95.0)	28.6 (83.5)	21.1 (70.0)	21.4 (70.5)	25.8 (78.4)	28.9 (84.0)	32.8 (91.0)	37.8 (100.0)	42.5 (108.5)	43.4 (110.1)
Mean daily maximum °C (°F)	24.5 (76.1)	25.0 (77.0)	22.9 (73.2)	20.3 (68.5)	17.4 (63.3)	14.6 (58.3)	14.2 (57.6)	15.3 (59.5)	16.9 (62.4)	19.4 (66.9)	21.2 (70.2)	22.5 (72.5)	19.5 (67.1)
Mean daily minimum °C (°F)	11.6 (52.9)	11.9 (53.4)	10.7 (51.3)	8.1 (46.6)	6.6 (43.9)	4.8 (40.6)	4.8 (40.6)	5.5 (41.9)	6.4 (43.5)	7.4 (45.3)	8.8 (47.8)	10 (50)	8.0 (46.4)
Record low °C (°F)	0.6 (33.1)	1.3 (34.3)	−0.7 (30.7)	−3.6 (25.5)	−2.3 (27.9)	−5.0 (23.0)	−4.5 (23.9)	−4.6 (23.7)	−1.8 (28.8)	−2.8 (27.0)	−1.0 (30.2)	1.0 (33.8)	−5.0 (23.0)
Average rainfall mm (inches)	30.7 (1.21)	25.5 (1.00)	41.9 (1.65)	52.6 (2.07)	62.8 (2.47)	89.0 (3.50)	96.0 (3.78)	100.5 (3.96)	84.8 (3.34)	62.6 (2.46)	51.6 (2.03)	46.9 (1.85)	743.5 (29.27)
Average rainy days (≥ 1.0 mm)	5.3	4.0	6.4	7.5	9.6	11.9	12.7	12.3	11.1	9.4	7.4	6.6	104.2
Source: Australian Bureau of Meteorology

== See also ==
- Heywood railway station, Victoria
