= Budj Bim (disambiguation) =

Budj Bim is an extinct volcano in south-western Victoria, Australia, also known as Mount Eccles.

Budj Bim may also refer to:

- Budj Bim heritage areas, which include three designated heritage areas in the vicinity of the mountain
- Budj Bim National Park, a national park which includes the mountain
