= Gunditjmara =

Aboriginal Australian people

The Gunditjmara (Note: Barry Blake questions the historical authenticity of Gunditjmara as a collective ethnonym current among the Dhauwurd wurrung, and says it came into use after being picked up by later ethnographers. 'Gunditjmara' was, he argues, used only in the context of specific clan naming (Blake 2003, p. 2).) or Gunditjamara, (Note: AIATSIS gives this spelling on their website (Indigenous Australians 2018).) also known as Dhauwurd Wurrung, are an Aboriginal people of southwestern Victoria in Australia. They are the Traditional Owners of the areas now encompassing Warrnambool, Port Fairy, Woolsthorpe and Portland. Their Country includes much of the Budj Bim heritage areas. The Kerrup Jmara (Kerrupjmara, Kerrup-Jmara) are a clan of the Gunditjmara, whose traditional lands are around Lake Condah. The Koroitgundidj (Koroit gundidj) are another clan group, whose lands are around Tower Hill.

The Gunditjmara are famous for their extensive landscape engineering prowess shown in constructing kilometres of eel aquaculture channels, holding ponds, and fish traps in and around Budj Bim.

The Gunditjmara are famously known as the Fighting Gunditjmara because of their extensive resistance against British invasion of their Country during the Eumeralla Wars.

== Name ==
Gunditjmara is formed from two morphemes: Gunditj, a suffix denoting belonging to a particular group or locality, and the noun mara, meaning "man". (Note: It was reported that this was one of four terms (the other three being Koondoom (water), karrup (lake) and tyarrk (swamp)) designating Lake Condah. However the report from 1880 arguably garbled information from an Aboriginal informant.(Clark 2014b, p. 245))

== Language ==
The Dhauwurd wurrung language is a term used for a group of languages spoken by various groups of the Gunditjmara people. Different linguists have identified different groupings of lects and languages (see the main article for details), and the whole group is also sometimes referred to as the Gunditjmara language or the Warrnambool language. Some of the major languages or dialects often grouped under these names were:

- Keerray Woorroong (Girai Wurrung, Kirrae wuurong, Kiriwurrung, etc.) is regarded by the Victorian Aboriginal Corporation for Languages as a separate language; it is of the Girai wurrung people.
- Gadubanud (Katubanut), also Yarro waetch, was spoken by a group known as the Gadubanud, of the Cape Otway area; Barry Blake regards this as a dialect of the Warrnambool language, but Krishna-Pillay does not.
- Djargurd Wurrong (Warn tallin, Warn thalayn,) was the language of the Djargurd Wurrong people.

== Country ==
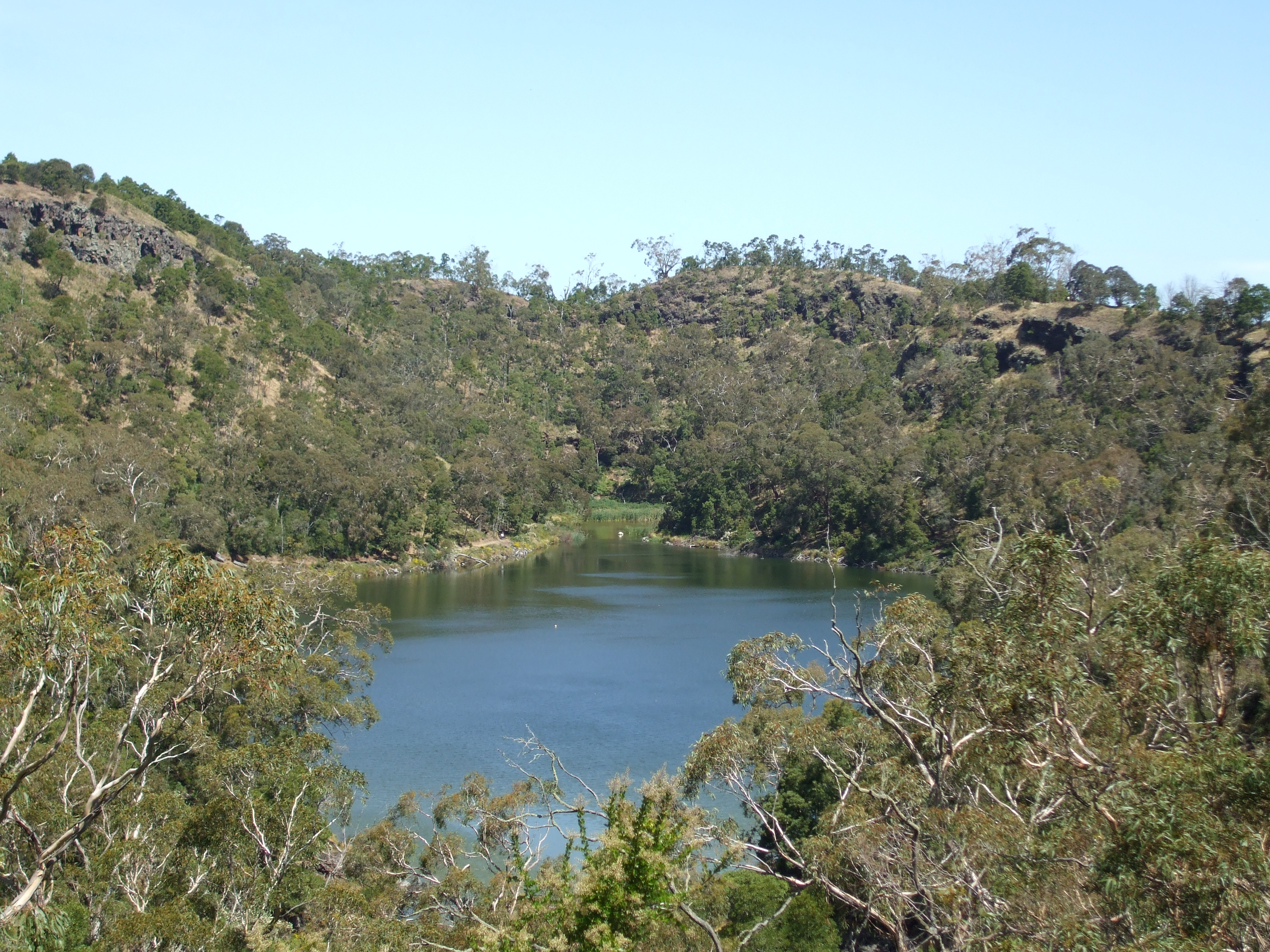
Budj Bim National Park

Gunditjmara territories extend over an estimated 7,000 square kilometres (2,700 mi^{2}). The western boundaries are around Cape Bridgewater and Lake Condah. Northwards they reach Caramut and Hamilton. Their eastern boundaries lay around the Hopkins River. (Note: Howitt writes that their nation:'extended from the southern limits of the Muk-jarawaint to the sea, and from Mt Gambier to the Eumerella Creek, and included the Kuurn-kopan-noot and Peek-whuurrung tribes, described by Mr Dawson' (Howitt 1904)) Their neighbours to the west are the Buandig people, to the north the Jardwadjali and Djab wurrung peoples, and in the east the Girai wurrung people. Early colonists remarked on the richness of the game to be found from the Eumerella Creek down to the coast. (Note: "All the land that lay between Eumeralla proper and the sea, a tract of country of some twenty or thirty miles square, had been probably from time immemorial a great hunting-ground and rendezvous for the surrounding tribes. It was no doubt eminently fitted for such a purpose. It swarmed with game, and in the spring was one immense preserve of every kind of wild fowl and wild animal that the country owned." (Boldrewood 1896, p. 63))

== Culture ==
The way of life of the Aboriginal people of Western Victoria differed from other Aboriginal Victorians in several respects. Because of the colder houses, they made, wore, and used as blankets, rugs of possum and kangaroo. Possum-skin cloaks, used by Gunditjmara and other peoples of the south-east, were made sewn with string, and worn for warmth, used to carry babies on their backs, as drums in ceremony and as a burial cloak. They are still made today as part of revitalisation of culture and as an instrument for healing.

They also built huts from wood and local basalt (known as bluestone), with roofs made of turf and branches. Stone tools were used for cutting, and are held in collections across Victoria today. The women used digging sticks, also known as yam sticks, for digging yams, goannas, ants and other foods out of the ground, as well as for defence, for settling disputes and for punishment purposes as part of customary law.

=== Dreaming ===
The Gunditjmara believe that the landscape's features mark out the traces of a creator, Budj Bim (meaning "High Head"), who emerged in the form of the volcano previously called Mount Eccles. In a spate of eruption, the lava flows, constituting his blood and teeth, spilled over the landscape, fashioning its wetlands. "High Head" still refers to the crater's brow, which can be accessed only by Gunditjmara men wearing special emu-feather footwear. Opposite, beyond the coastline, the island they call Deen Maar/Dhinmar held special value for its burial associations. Rocks on the mainland shore facing the island contain a cave, known as Tarn wirrung ("road of the spirits"), which is thought of as the mouth of a passage linking the mainland and the island.

In Gunditjmara funeral rites, bodies are enfolded in grass bundles and interred with their heads pointing to the island, with an apotropaic firebrand of native cherry wood. If grass was thereafter found outside the mouth of Tarn wirrung, it was regarded as evidence that the good spirit Puit puit chepetch had conveyed the corpse via the subterranean passage to the island, while guiding its spirit to the realm of the clouds. If the burial coincided with the appearance of a meteor, this was read as proof that the being in transit to the heavens had been furnished with fire. If grass was found at the cave when no one had been buried, then it was thought it showed someone had been murdered, and the cave could not be approached until the grass had been dispersed. (Note: 'These tribes, like those in the Wimmera River district, have a spirit-home, which is called maioga in some of the dialects, and mung'-o in others. All the clans have the same maioga, which consists of an island a short distance off the coast of Victoria, about half way between Warrnambool and Portland. The native name of this island is Dhinmar, but it is known on the map as Lady Julia Percy Island. On the shore of the mainland facing the island there are some large rocks, into the base of one of which the ceaseless rolling of the billows has worn a cavelike recess, respecting which the natives have a superstitious belief that it is in some way connected with Dhinmar. Every deceased person, when buried, is laid with his head pointing towards this island. His spirit then provides itself with a firebrand, consisting of a piece of dry cherry tree, because this wood emits a peculiar odour whilst burning, which has the power of warding off danger from the bearer. The spectre then proceeds to the shore where the rock is situated, where he divests himself of any clothing or trinkets he may be wearing on his body, and disappears over the intervening sea to Dhinmar. The spirits of all the clans and phratries go to this island, which they occupy in common, the same as they did in their native hunting grounds. There they remain until reincarnated (Mathews 1904, p. 297).)

== Social organisation ==
The Gunditjmara were divided into 59 clans, each with its headmen (wungit), a role passed on by hereditary transmission. They spoke distinct dialects, not all of them mutually intelligible, with the three main hordes located around Lake Condah, Port Fairy and Woolsthorpe respectively. The Gunditjmara groups are divided into two moieties, respectively the grugidj (sulphur-crested cockatoo or long-billed corella) and the gabadj (red-tailed black cockatoo, the latter once thriving in buloke woodlands, now mainly cleared. (Note: The variety of red-tailed black cockatoo indigenous to an enclave in south western Victoria is now recognized as a distinct species, Calyptorhynchus banksii graptogyne (Australian Endangered Species 2007).)

According to Alfred William Howitt, they had four sections, which however did not affect marriage rules:

- kerup (water)
- boom (mountain)
- direk (swamp)
- gilger (river)

However these terms refer to 4 of the 58 clans.

Descent was matrilineal.

=== Clans ===
The following is a list of the Gunditjmara clans (conedeet), (Note: conedeet is a term, meaning something like 'belonging to', found only in clan names, thus Cart conedeet marr would be 'an (Aboriginal) man(marr) belonging to (conedeet) the Cart gundidj (see 10 below). According to James Dawson, conedeet, properly to be transcribed as kuurndit, functioned like the suffix -er in words like Londoner, meaning 'belonging to.'. It was one of a series of terms among Australian band societies, like bulluc and corroke, affixed to a prominent toponym, and serving to indicate the locality a band was associated with (Peterson & Long 1986, p. 47).) taken from that in Ian D. Clark's work.

No	Clan name	Approximate location
1	Art gundidj	Tarrone station, near Moyne Swamp
2	Ballumin gundidj	unknown
3	Bate gundidj	Junction of Stokes, Crawford and Glenelg Rivers
4	Biteboren gundidj	Grasmere station
5	Bokerer gundidj	Glenelg River
6	Bome gundidj	unknown
7	Bonedol gundidj	Ponedol Hills
8	Can can corro gundidj	south-southeast of Mount Rouse
9	Carnbul gundidj	southwest of Tahara station
10	Cart gundidj	Mount Clay
11	Cartcorang gundidj	Lake Cartcorang
12	Corry gundidj	unknown
13	Cupponenet gundidj	Mount Chaucer
14	Dandeyallum	Portland Bay
15	Direk gundidj	Condah Swamp
16	Gilgar gundidj	Darlots Creek
17	Kerup gundidj (aka Kerrup Jmara)	Lake Condah
18	Kilcarer gundidj	Convincing Ground
19	Koroit gundidj	Tower Hill
20	Lay gundidj mallo	unknown
21	Mallun gundidj	Griffiths Island
22	Meen gundidj	unknown
23	Mendeet gundidj marayn	unknown
24	Moonwer gundidj	near Sisters Point, southwest of Killarney
25	Moperer gundidj	Spring Creek
26	Mordoneneet gundidj	southwest or west-southwest of Mount Rouse
27	Morro gundidj	south of Mount Rouse
28	Mum keelunk gundidj	Boodcarra Lake, west of Goose Lagoon
29	Mumdorrong gundidj	Marm reserve, south of Lake Wangoom
30	Narcurrer gundidj	southwest of Crawford River
31	Nartitbeer gundidj	Dunmore station
32	Net net yune gundidj	southeast of Crawford River
33	Nillan gundidj	south-southwest of Mount Napier
34	Omebegare rege gundidj	junction of Merri River and Spring Creek
35	Pallapnue gundidj Their clan head was Koort Kirrup (1840), (Note: Koort Kirrup was arrested in late August 1843 for the murder of two squatters Donald McKenzie and Frederick Edinge a year earlier, on 15 May 1842. He languished in prison for at least 2 years because no interpreter could understand his Wullu wurrung dialect. He laid the blame on some South Australian and Portland natives (Clark 1995, p. 46).)	Stokes River
36	Peerracer	unknown
37	Ponungdeet gundidj	junction of Glenelg and Stokes Rivers
38	Pyipgil gundidj	Port Fairy townsite
39	Tarrerwung gundidj	mouth of Glenelg River. Clan head Mingbum (1840)
40	Tarerer gundidj	Tarerer (Kellys Swamp), a swamp between Tower Hill and Merri River
41	Tarngonene wurrer gundidj	Surrey River
42	Teerar gundidj	southeast of Spring Creek station
43	Tolite gundidj	unknown
44	Tone gundidj	near Hopkins River
45	Ure gundidj	Portland township
46	Wane gundidj	Grasmere station
47	Wanedeet gundidj	Tahara and Murndal stations
48	Warerangur gundidj	Aringa station
49	Waywac gundidj	southwest of Mount Rouse
50	Weereweerip gundidj	east of Eumeralla River
51	Woortenwan	unknown
52	Worcarre gundidj	northeast of the head of Stokes River
53	Worerome killink gundidj	Macarthur
54	Worn gundidj	west of Mount Warrnambool
55	Yallo gundidj	junction of Crawford and Glenelg Rivers
56	Yambeet gundidj	Yambuk station
57	Yarrer gundidj	between Campbell's Merri River station and Allandale station
58	Yiyar gundidj	Mount Eckersley.
59	Yowen (Yowenillum/ Tarrone) gundidj (Note: the Yowen gundidj consisted of at least several families settled in a "village" site near excellent waterholes. The Moyne river was spanned by a large weir roughlyt 60 metres long and 1.5 metres high which the Yowen built as an eel trap. Over 200 Gunditjmara gathered there in autumn to enjoy the eel catch (Clark 1995, p. 43).)	Moyne River

== Economy ==
The Gunditjmara are traditionally river and lake people, with Framlingham Forest, Lake Condah and the surrounding river systems being of great importance to them economically and spiritually. Numerous distinct structures, extending over 100 square kilometres (39 mi^{2}) of the landscape, are employed for the purpose of catching short-finned eels, the staple of the Gunditjmara diet. These include stone races, canals, traps, stone walls, stone house sites (Note: Archaeologically not all circular outcrops of basalt bordering sinkholes and lava tubes were crafted stone houses, but rather resulted from natural processes, from geological or arboreal shifting of masses (Clarke 1994, pp. 4–5, 8).) and stone cairns. Some of the groundwork is older than the Egyptian pyramids. A controversy exists concerning the extent to which these features are the results of natural environmental processes or cultural modifications of the landscape by Indigenous people. Peter Coutts and others argued, in a work entitled Aboriginal Engineers of the Western District, Victoria, that numerous features show the handiwork of Aboriginal landscaping for economic purposes. This thesis was challenged as a mythical "romancing of the landscape" by Anne Clarke, one that confused natural processes with socially crafted infrastructure. However, fresh archaeological work by Heather Builth led to her contending that they had a sophisticated system of aquaculture and eel farming. They built stone dams to hold the water in these swampy volcanic areas, especially the area comprising the lava flow of the Budj Bim volcano, creating ponds and wetlands in which they harvested short-finned eels (kuyang or more commonly kooyang). (Note: Another word for eel exists, kakong (Blake 2003, p. 184).)

The Budj Bim National Heritage Landscape, which includes both the Tyrendarra Area and the Mt Eccles – Lake Condah Area, comprising Budj Bim National Park (formerly Mt Eccles National Park), Stones State Faunal Reserve, Muldoons Aboriginal Land, Allambie Aboriginal Land and Condah Mission) was added to the National Heritage List on 20 July 2004, under the Environment Protection and Biodiversity Conservation Act 1999.

Several designated areas comprising the Budj Bim Cultural Landscape were added to the UNESCO World Heritage List in 2019. In the wake of the burning of some 7,000 hectares of bushland around Lake Condah and in the Budj Bim National Park, further channel structures came to light.

They also created channels linking these wetlands. These channels contained weirs with large woven baskets made by women to cull mature eels. Professor Peter Kershaw, noted palynologist at Monash University, as cited by Bruce Pascoe in his best-selling work Dark Emu, found evidence of a sudden change in vegetation consistent with an artificial ponding system, and initial radiocarbon dating of the soil samples suggests the ponds were created up to 8,000 years ago.

The eels were prepared by smoking them with burning leaves from Australian blackwood. The coastal clans, like other tribes on the south-west coast, according to an early colonist, Thomas Browne, had a rich fish diet, which included whale (cunderbul) flesh. (Note: Browne noted that the local aboriginals. 'had been for untold generations accustomed to a dietary scale of exceptional liberality. The climate was temperate; the forests abounded in game; wild fowl at certain seasons were plentiful; while the sea supplied them with fish of all sorts and sizes, from a whale (stranded) to a whitebait' (Clark 2011).)

== History ==
In a study published in February 2020, new evidence produced by using a form of radiometric dating known as argon-argon dating, showed that both Budj Bim and Tower Hill volcanoes erupted at least 34,000 years ago. Specifically, Budj Bim was dated at within 3,100 years either side of 36,900 years BP, and Tower Hill was dated at within 3,800 years either side of 36,800 years BP. Significantly, this is a "minimum age constraint for human presence in Victoria", and also could be interpreted as evidence for the Gunditjmara oral histories which tell of volcanic eruptions being some of the oldest oral traditions in existence. An axe found underneath volcanic ash in 1947 was also proof that humans inhabited the region before the eruption of Tower Hill.

The beginnings of contact with ngamadjidj (white people) date as far back as 1810, when whalers and sealers began to use Portland as a base area for their operations. Contact exposed the local people to epidemics from new diseases born by whites but otherwise was seasonal, and allowed time for demographic recovery.

=== Eumerella Wars ===
The major turn in relations occurred with the arrival of, and settlement of their lands by, the Henty Brothers from 1834 onwards. (Note: Edward Henty came ashore at Portland on 19 November of that year (Clark 1995, p. 22).) Though much silence surrounded the massacres that took place, and, despite Boldrerwood's explicit testimony, (Note: Like all guerillas, moreover, their act of outrage took place sometimes in one part of a large district, sometimes in another, the actors vanishing meanwhile, and reappearing with puzzling rapidity (Boldrewood 1896, p. 67).) some early historians dismissed the idea of a guerilla war. (Note: Henry Giles Turner wrote in 1904 after citing the highly laudatory opinion of Western district aborigines registered by James Dawson who dwelt in the midst of the conflict but never suffered aggression because he treated indigenous people fairly:'The wars which our American cousins waged for two hundred years against the brave and crafty redskins; the long struggles in Canada against the confederated six nations; the storming by British troops of native Pahs in New Zealand; the protracted wars, costly in blood and treasure, involved in the subjugation of the kaffirs and Zulus in South Africa; nay, even the more circumscribed, but still bloody "Black War" in Tasmania, had no counterpart in the settlement of the colony of Victoria. The reason is not far to seek, and it does not necessarily imply any want of courage on the part of the invaded. They were comparatively few in number, and they were dispersed in small tribes over a large area of country. By their habits, their superstitions and their traditions they were so involved in strife among themselves, that there was no possible basis of federation to resist the invader' (Turner 2011, p. 216).)

The Gunditjmara people fought fiercely for their lands during what became known as the Eumerella Wars, which lasted for decades. Women would fight as well, using their digging sticks which had a dual purpose as a weapon, for defence, for settling disputes and for meting out punishments as part of customary law.

Ian D. Clark has identified 28 massacre sites most of the colonialist slaughters taking place during the Eumerella War, so named when the phrase was used as a chapter heading in the memoirs of the novelist Rolf Boldrewood who squatted 50,000 acres near Port Fairy a decade after the main killings.

Sometime in 1833–1834, though the incident has been dated later, to around, 1839, whalers, perhaps 'tonguers,' (Note: "Tonguers 'were those who contracted to tow the whale carcasses ashore and to cut them up and who received in payment the oil from the dissected carcass, including the tongue and interior parts'." (Clark 2011)) are thought to have clashed with the Kilcarer Gundidj on the beach at Portland at a site that later became known as Convincing Ground in an incident now known as the Convincing Ground massacre. Various versions exist. The site earned its name either because whalers hashed out their disputes there, because some transaction took place between the indigenous people and whalers, or because disputes arose, either of whale flesh or of the use of native women. (Note: Clark states that Critchett's interpretation that sexual relations with native women was a cause is based on a misreading of Robinson's journal (Clark 2011)) If the dispute was over the carcass of a beached whale, the whites may have wished to flense it while the natives may have insisted that it was theirs, as dictated by their ancient customs.

Estimates of the number of people killed in the dispute is unknown, varying from only a few to 30, 60 and as high as 200. All but two of the Kilcarer gundidj clan, Pollikeunnuc and Yarereryarerer, (Note: This remnant of two was absorbed into the Cart gundidj of Mount Clay and the Ure gundidj and Bome gundidj clans (Clark 1995, p. 22).) were said to have died. Robinson surmised many had been killed from encounters with 30 members of several different Dhauwurd wurrung clans. A minority view argued by Michael Connors, emerging in the context of Australia's recent History wars argues the figure of 200 dead misinterprets an 1841 report by the Portland Police Magistrate James Blair to Governor Latrobe referring to up to 200 Aboriginals amassing at Convincing Ground, and claims that modern research has fabricated the massacre. His arguments have been analysed, with a negative verdict by Ian D. Clark.

George Augustus Robinson, the official Protector of Aborigines, in travelling in this western area in 1841, reported that settlers in the districts spoke of 'dropping the Aborigines as coolly as if speaking of dropping birds.' The loss of numbers, and headsmen meant clans were forced to unite under other clans and their chieftains. Thus the wungit of the Yiyar clan Boorn Boorn assumed leadership of the Cart gunditj, the Kilgar gunditj and Eurite gunditj when their leadership was eliminated.

Rev Benjamin Hurst (missionary to the Port Phillip tribe) noted in a Weslayen Mission meeting in 1841 that in the Portland bay area "it was usual for some to go out in parties on the Sabbath with guns, for the ostensible purpose of kangarooing, but, in reality to hunt and kill these miserable beings — the bones and the bodies of the slaughtered blacks had been found — but because the evidence of the native was not admissible in a court, the white murderers had escaped with impunity, and were still pursuing their career of crime and blood". (Note: "Mr. Hurst, (missionary to the aborigines of Port Phillip ), startled the audience, by a recital of facts that had been communicated to him, in reference to the treatment of the natives in the neighbourhood of Portland bay. He said it was usual for some to go out in parties on the Sabbath with guns, for the os-tensible purpose of kangarooing, but, in reality to hunt and kill these miserable beings — the bones and the bodies of the slaughtered blacks had been found— but because the evidence of the native was not admissible in a court, the white murderers had escaped with im - punity, and were still pursuing their career of crime and blood." (Launceston Advertiser 1841:3))

Resisting dispossession, the Gunditjmara concentrated in the Stony Rises from which they waged guerilla warfare against the pastoralists usurping their lands, raiding their flocks and herds. Some protection was also afforded by the native protectorate set up at Mount Rouse, which the tribes used as a basis for their operations. A particular point of ire were settlements that took over sacred sites associated with Mount Napier, Lake Condah and Port Fairy.

Due to the ongoing battles in the 1840s, the Gunditjmara became well known as "The fighting Gunditjmara". (Note: "The frequently used name 'the fighting Gunditjmara' resists this culture of forgetting. Originally referring to their long conflict with Europeans during the Eumerella Wars of the 1840s, the 'fighting Gunditjmara' is now used by the Western District Aboriginal community to refer to their military contributions for Australia and their considerable achievements in sport," (Horton 2015))

28 massacres in Gunditjmara country 1833/4 to ?
Date	Location	Aboriginal people involved	Europeans involved	Aboriginal deaths reported
1833 or 1834	Convincing Grounds two miles west of the mouth of the Surrey River	Kilcarer gundidj clan	Whalers	from 60 to 200 people, decimating all but 2 tribespeople
June 1838	Merino Downs station, Wannon River, near Henty	unknown Gunditjmara clan	Joseph Bonsor, shepherd and hutkeeper, who had been waddied	1 Gunditmara man
October 1838	Merino Downs station, Wannon River, near Henty	unknown Gunditjmara clan	William Heath, shepherd, killed	1 Gunditmara man, stabbed with sheep shears. Oral version 40. (Note: Heath had been killed by 7 aborigines in a punitive raid for molesting local women. The Aboriginal version is that upwards of 40 were killed in retaliation (Clark 1995, p. 23).)
October 1838	Samuel Winter's station Spring Valley or Murndal, Wannon River, near Merino	unknown Gunditjmara clan	William Jefrey speared, while, with Charles Corrigan and, William Elliot, fighting a mob raiding for sheep	2 Gunditmara men
November 1838	Samuel Winter's station Spring Valley or Murndal	unknown Gunditjmara clan	7 whites set upon and shot an Aboriginal group of 20–30 camping at the Wannon River	1 Gunditjmara youth wounded, fate unknown
February 1840	Merino Downs station, Wannon River, near Henty	unknown Gunditjmara clan	A shepherd named Blood maliciously wounded Woolangwang	1 man, Woolangwang, died.
Before 17 February 1840	George Winter's Tahara station on the Wannon River and McLeods Creek, northeast of Merino	unknown Gunditjmara or Djab Wurrung clan	George Winter and his men, one, Robinson known for his violence. He had dashed out the brains of an Aboriginal child.	5 Gunditjmara or Djab Wurrung men killed
February / March 1840	unknown	a presumed Gunditjmara man	A stockman employed by the Henty brothers	1 Gunditjmara shot wantonly
date unknown	Clover Flat, junction of junction of Bryan Creek. and the Wannon River, near Casterton. Called 'Murdering Flat'. (Note: James Henty wasa to claim, in the face of ac cusations regarding this putative incident that his accusers had confused the incident involving the death ofone of his shepherds at this spot and a massacre which took place around that time nearby, at Konongwootong (Clark 1995, pp. 27–28).)	Either Gunditjmara or Jardwadjali.	Thought to have occurred after one of Francis Henty.'s shepherds was killed.	No. of victims unknown. (Note: " While the blacks were holding a corroboree and feasting on some freshly killed stock they were fired upon by the settlers, using an old cannon loaded with bolts, nails, gravel and stones with telling effect. The place was afterwards known as Murdering Flat. As far as is known there was no grave; the bodies were put in the river." (Massola 1969, pp. 44–45))
Perhaps November 1840	Wannon River, between the Sandford Bridge and junction with Glenelg River	Either Gunditjmara or Jardwadjali.	Connell, an overseer for the Henty brothers, whose stocks of flour were subject to stealing	'dozens' reportedly killed by arsenic poisoning.
Around 1841	Picaninny Waterhole, Springbank, Glenelg River, south of Casterton	Elderly Gunditjmara	Tom, a shepherd for John Henty, who shot and then bayonetted to death a woman.	Narrerburnin, a wife of the Pallapnue gundidj headsman Koort Kirrup
2 June 1841	Valley of 'Cor.roit'	Wanedeet gundidj clan of the Gunditjmara	3 shepherds working for W. J. Purbrick shot Aborigines after reportedly offering them damper.	'Kitting', 'Marg', and 'Piccaninny Jemmy'
date unknown	place unknown, perhaps identical to Murdering Flat (2) above.	unknown clan of Gunditjmara	Shepherds working for either Edward Henty at Muntham or Francis Henty at Merino Downs, using poison.	7 Gunditjmara: Bokarcarreep, Corroitleek, Joeingjoeingburmin, Loohechurning, Marnderremin, Tolort and Yangolarri
3 January 1842	Eumeralla station	Unknown Gunditjmara:clan	James Guthrie, overseer at the Eumeralla station	I Gunditjmara, shot dead while reportedly wielding a liangle
February 1842	Tarrone station, Moyne River, some 12 miles north of Port Fairy	Yowen gundidj clan	40 men formed a vigilante band, after 7 stockmen were faced by a milling mob of Aborigines at the station, and tracked them down to a camp, which they plundered while shooting those who fled.	2 or 3.
24 February 1842	The junction of Lubra Creek and the Penshurst–Caramut road, at Caramut station	Moperer gundidj clan	6 settlers attacked and killed 5 members of two families asleep among tea-trees by a stream off Mustons Creek and plundered their goods. 3 of the murderers were put on trial before a jury of mainly squatters in a court presided over by Redmond Barry and though the incident was well documented, were deemed not guilty.	4 women, Connyer, Natgoncher (pregnant), Wenigoniber, Wooigouing, and 1 male child (Note: Two emen, Calangamite and Pinchingannock (Wooigouing's husband and a child named Uni-bicqui-ang managfed to escape (Clark 1995, pp. 35–36).)
October 1842	Tarrone station	Yowen gundidj clan	Dr James Kilgour who had established his station on the Yowen lands, mustered 40 men to take revenge for a shepherd's murder, and shot two or three in a camp.. Robertson, an overseer then supplied members of the tribe with flour laced with arsenic. (Note: Robinson, the Protector of Aboriogines, wrote that Kilgour had a 'more depraved set' of workers than he had ever met, and that Kilgour was 'like all new arrivals, a declared enemy of the blacks', though he had never personally been harmed by them (Shaw 2003, p. 131).)	9 killed: three men, three women and three children
1842	Warndaa ssite at Boggy Gully, near Black Swamp, just west of Merrang House, on the Hopkins River south of Hexham	Moperer gundidj clan	unknown	unknown
1842	near Donald McKenzie's station on the Crawford River	Net net yune gundidj clan	Donald McKenzie and Frederick Edinge had been killed 15 May 1842 and revenge was taken on an unknown number of Gunditjmara	Several.
September 1843	Headwaters of the Crawford River	Pallapnue gundidj clan	Australian native police under HEP Dana in retribution for the killing of Christopher Bassett in August 1843 and the theft of his flock.	9 shot dead in two separate incidents.
October 1843	8 miles from Mount Eckersley, on the road between Portland and Kanawalla	Gunditjmara	George D Lockhart of Kanawalla station had his dray stolen by attackers. Pursued by HEP Dana and his native police, of whom two wounded.	2 Aborigines killed, one wounded
25 January 1844	Mullagh station, nearly 7 miles north of Harrow	clan unknown	Thomas Barrett was threatened with a liang by a Gunditjmara who wanted his bag of flour	1 aboriginal, Jim, was shot dead
20 May 1847	Euremete and Lyne stations, near Branxholme	unknown clan of Gunditjmara	A GW Elms shepherd attacked. Subsequently, a group of settlers clashed with some men believed to be responsible	2 dead
April 1847	Eumeralla district	Nillan gundidj clan,	Native Police Corps	Tarerer (Jupiter) and Tykoohe (Cocknose) (Note: 'These strangely- named individuals had been familiar to our ears ever since our arrival."Jupiter"was supposed to have a title to the head chieftainship of the tribe which specially affected the Rocks and the neighbourhood of the extinct volcano. Cocknose had been named by the early settlers from the highly unclassical shape of the facial appendage. Buckup sent a man to each corner, and himself with two troopers charged into the centre. Spears began to fly, and boomerangs; but the wild men had little chance with their better-armed countrymen. Out bolts a flying fugitive, and makes for the nearest reed-bed. Tallboy is nearest to him, and his horse moves as he raises his carbine, and disturbs the aim. Striking him savagely over the head with the butt end, he raises his piece, fires, and Jupiter drops on his face. Quick shots follow, a general stampede takes place, but few escape, and when the troop turn their horses' heads homeward, all the known leaders of the tribe are down. They were caught redhanded, too, a portion of a heifer and her calf freshly slaughtered being found on the spot where they were first sighted.' Boldrewood's account has been questioned, as Jupiter was captured in April of that year (Boldrewood 1896, pp. 65, 84–85).)
1847	Mount Eccles,	Gunjditjmara, clan.unknown	Settler vigilante group	An estimated 30 Aborigines, including babies.
Between August 1843 and 1849	Castlemaddie or Ettrick pastoral runs	Gunjditjmara, clan.unknown	William Learmonth, who had taken up 39,000 acres, and the Jamieson brothers, William and Robert	1 Aborigine. (Note: at lowest estimate a good-sized party was discovered killing a bullock of Messrs. Jamieson, near Ettrick. The brothers Jamieson and Major Learmonth—then unknown to martial fame—went out to dispute title. The scene was in a reed-brake—the opposing force numerous. Spears began to drop searchingly amid and around the little party. It looked like anotherIsandula, and the swart foe crept ominously close, and yet more close, from tree to tree. Then a spear struck William Jamieson in the forehead—a rough straw hat alone saving his brain. The blood rushed down, and, dripping on his gun, damped the priming. Things looked bad. A little faltering had lost the fight. But the Laird of Ettrick shot the savage dead who threw the spear, and under cover of this surprise he and Robert Jamieson carried their wounded comrade safely out of the field (Boldrewood 1896, pp. 69–70).)
unknown	Lake Gorrie, Squattleseamere	Gunjditjmara, clan.unknown	A groups of settlers led by Charles Hamilton Macknight who had just acquired 47,228 acres in the district, in retribution for the pillaging by 30 blacks of some stores.	unknown number
1840s?-early 1850s?	Murderers Flat by Darlots Creek, Lake Condah Mission	Kerup gundidj clan,	Unknown white gave the community a large bag of flour laced with arsenic. This is a Kerup clan tradition, though there are numerous difficulties with the version given by Rose Donker. (Note: The inferred date would place it around the time Cecil Pybus Cooke managed the Lake Condah area from mid 1850, and he had excellent relations with the blacks, fed them andallowed them to live there and no mention of this occurs in his papers. One would expect that the Aborigines would have mentioned it to him. Two contradictory versions exist of a massacre here, one of poisoning, the other of fighting, Confusion also may exist because the putative incident was confused with memories of another massacre in that area, known as Murderers Flat (Clark 1995, pp. 54–56).) (Note: The following oral report by Mrs Mary Clarke, a descendant of Portland area Gunditjmara, recounts that an overseer on a station saw one of two groups of travelling natives and asked them if they were hungry: Well, you go and sit down over there in that shed.' And they went there. He said, 'I'll make you something to eat,' and he had a great big boiler. He had a boiler there. It was in the shearing shed that he took them to have this meal..They was finished shearing and they took the Aborigines there to have something to eat. They were weak and hungry, and she said, she said to some of her friends, 'I'm not stopping. I'm gunna go on, I'll gop on and I'll come, we'll come back' – she was with her tribe.. and she said, 'I'll come back next morning.' So they did come back and..The overseer made this porridge and he finished them. He put strychnine in it. They didn't known what he was doing, and they're all sitting around looking hungry, all sitting there little children and all, and he was giving them porridge, serving the porridge out to them, and they all went-flop. He murdered them with the porridge, the strychnine in the porridge. And when my mother-in-law came back with her tribe, she said she find them all dead. Children on the mothers- the babies on the mother's breast and little tiny fellows and them all laying about all scattered around dead... Condah, Bloody Lake, they called it. (Critchett 1998, pp. 2–3))	20 men, women and children

=== Mission life ===
From the mid- late 19th century attempts were made to have them move into the Framlingham Aboriginal Station, a mission outside Warrnambool. This was unacceptable, it was located moreover on Girai wurrung land. 827 hectares were set aside for them at Lake Condah, and two decades later, in 1885, this reserve was expanded by a further 692 hectares. The tribe congregated here, until an act was passed to deny right of residence to any "half-caste", resulting in the dispersal of many Gunditjmara kinsfolk, and the loss of their collective traditions, with the Condah mission numbers dropping drastically from 117 to 20.

The land was reclaimed in 1951 by the government and allocated to returnee soldiers.

In 2005 the area began to be bulldozed for groundwork for an eight-lot subdivision. The dispute was settled when the area was set aside as a reservation, in an agreement forged in February 2007.

== Native title ==
In 1987, the Victorian Labor government under John Cain attempted to grant some of the Framlingham State Forest to the trust as inalienable title. However, the legislation was blocked by the Liberal Party opposition in the Victorian Legislative Council. The federal Labor government under Bob Hawke intervened, passing the Aboriginal Land (Lake Condah and Framlingham Forest) Act 1987, which gave 1,130 acres (5 km^{2}) of the Framlingham Forest to the Framlingham Trust. Although the title is essentially inalienable, in that it can only be transferred to another Indigenous land trust, the Framlingham Trust has rights to prevent mining on the land, unlike trusts or communities holding native title.

The Lake Condah Mission lands were also returned to the Gunditjmara on 1 January 1987, when the 53-hectare (130-acre) former reserve was vested to the Kerrup Jmara Elders Corporation. The transfer included "full management, control and enjoyment by the Kerrup-Jmara Elders Aboriginal Corporation of the land granted to it".

In 1993, the Peek Whurrong members of the Gunditjmara purchased the Deen Maar under the auspices of ATSIC for the Framlingham Aboriginal Trust, with the intention that it become an Indigenous Protected Area (IPA), it was granted this status in 1999. Becoming the first IPA in Victoria.

The Lake Condah Mob launched their Native Title Claim in August 1996.

On 30 March 2007, the Federal Court of Australia under Justice Anthony North determined on recognising the Gunditjmara People's non-exclusive native title rights and interests over 137,000 hectares (340,000 acres) of vacant Crown land, national parks, reserves, rivers, creeks and sea in the Portland region of Victoria's western district. 4,000 hectares (9,900 acres) between Dunkeld and Yambuk on Victoria's south-west coast were set aside to include the eastern Marr.

On 27 July 2011, together with the Eastern Maar people, the Gunditjmara People were recognised to be the native title-holders of the 4,000 hectares of Crown including Lady Julia Percy Island, known to them as Deen Maar.

== Gunditj Mirring Traditional Owners Aboriginal Corporation ==
The Gunditj Mirring Traditional Owners Aboriginal Corporation (GMTOAC) is a Registered Native Title Body Corporate (RNTBC) under the Commonwealth Native Title Act 1993, and a Registered Aboriginal Party under the Victorian Aboriginal Heritage Act 2006. The TOAC owns culturally significant properties across Western Victoria on behalf of the Gunditjmara community.

== Notable people ==
- Geoff Clark, the first and only elected Aboriginal chairman of ATSIC
- Vicki Couzens, Vice Chancellor's Indigenous Research Fellow at RMIT and senior knowledge custodian
- Johnny Cuzens, member of the First XI Aboriginal Cricket Team
- Dakota Davidson, Australian rules footballer
- Alfred Egan, the first indigenous player for Carlton and North Melbourne football clubs
- Isaiah Firebrace, singer who won the eighth season of The X Factor Australia and represented Australia in the Eurovision Song Contest 2017
- David Arden, Songman who won The National Indigenous Arts Awards, The 'Fellowships' Award, and a VIPA Song Of The Year Award For The Song "Freedom Called"
- Richard Frankland, playwright and musician
- Misty Jenkins, cancer researcher, Laboratory Head of Immunology at WEHI (the Walter and Eliza Hall Institute of Medical Research) at Melbourne University, first Indigenous Australian to attend Oxford and universities as a postdoctoral research fellow
- Chris Johnson, Brisbane Lions AFL player
- Nathan Lovett-Murray, Essendon AFL player
- Andrew Lovett, Essendon and St Kilda AFL player
- Ted Lovett, who was awarded Order of Australia Medal for services to the Indigenous community in south-west Victoria
- Wally Lovett, Richmond and Collingwood AFL player
- Norm McDonald, AFL player
- Wayne Milera, Australian rules footballer
- Archie Roach, musician, 2020 Victorian of the Year, winner of multiple Deadly Awards, ARIA Awards and other awards
- Lionel Rose, first Indigenous Australian of the Year, the first Indigenous World Champion Boxer, the first Indigenous person awarded a Gold Record for Music, first Indigenous recipient of an MBE
- Reg Saunders, first Aboriginal commissioned officer in the Australian Army
- Lidia Thorpe, a Gunai/Gunditjmara woman, first Aboriginal woman elected to the Parliament of Victoria, first Aboriginal Victorian federal MP (Australian Greens)
- Jamarra Ugle-Hagan, Australian rules footballer

== Alternative names ==
- Dhauhurtwurru (an ethnonnym from the name for the language)
- Gournditch-mara (['Gunditj] = name of Lake Condah ['mara] = ['ma:r] = man), Gurnditschmara
- Kirurndit
- Ku:nditjmara
- Kuurn-kopan-noot (language name)
- Ngutuk (This was an exonym, meaning 'thou', used by a neighbouring tribe.)
- Nil-can-cone-deets
- Port Fairy tribe (Used of the horde along that region's coast, which spoke a dialect called Peekwhuurong.)
- Spring Creek tribe (This referred the Woolsthorpe Mopor horde.)
- Tourahonong
- Villiers tribe
- Weeritch-Weeritch

Sources: Tindale 1974, p. 204 Howitt 1904, p. 69,

== Some words ==
- kunang (shit)
- malang (wife)
- merrejig ('good'; also used as a greeting)
- ngirang (mother)
- Ngutjung yangi-yangi ngutjung (good, very good)
- paratj (girl)
- pipayi/bebì (father)
- pundiya (to live)
- tarayl (virgin)
- thatha (to drink)
- thin wurn-ngayi (This is our place)
- thung (smoke)
- tjiparak (clown)
- walat (frost, ice)
- windha (where?)
- yul-yul (wild man)
- yuwa (to sleep)

== See also ==
- Budj Bim heritage areas

== Sources ==
- "About". Gunditj Mirring Traditional Owners Aboriginal Corporation (GMTOAC).
- Anderson, R. (2006). "The Convincing Ground: a case study in frontier and modern conflict". Bulletin of the Australasian Institute for Maritime Archaeology. 30: 137–147.
- "Australian Endangered Species: Southeastern red-tailed black-cockatoo (Calyptorhynchus banksii graptogyne)" (PDF). Department of Environment, Victorian Government. 2007.
- Blake, Barry J. (2003). The Warrnambool language: a consolidated account of the Aboriginal language of the Warrnambool area of the Western District of Victoria based on nineteenth-century sources (PDF). Pacific Linguistics, Research School of Pacific and Asian Studies. ISBN 978-0-858-83543-6.
- Boldrewood, Rolf (1896) [First published 1885]. Old Melbourne Memories (PDF). Macmillan Publishers – via Internet Archive.
- Boulton, Martin (28 January 2005). "Anger over plans to build on massacre site". The Age.
- "Budj Bim Cultural Landscape". UNESCO World Heritage Centre.
- Builth, Heather (2009). "Intangible Heritage of Indigenous Australians – a Victorian example" (PDF). Historic Environment. 22 (3): 24–31.
- Burin, Margaret (29 May 2012). "Aboriginal digger's family fights for compensation". Australian Broadcasting Corporation.
- Chai, Paul (27 January 2017). "On a mission: Uncovering the past of Victoria's Gunditjmara country". Traveller.com.au.
- Clark, Ian D. (1995). Scars in the Landscape: a register of massacre sites in western Victoria, 1803–1859 (PDF). AIATSIS. pp. 135–139. ISBN 0-85575-281-5.
- Clark, Ian D. (1998). "That's My Country Belonging to Me": Aboriginal Land Tenure and Dispossession in Nineteenth Century Western Victoria. Heritage Matters. ISBN 978-1-876-40406-2.
- Clark, Ian D. (2011). "The Convincing Ground Aboriginal massacre at Portland Bay, Victoria: fact or fiction?". Aboriginal History. 35. doi:10.22459/AH.35.2011.04.
- Clark, Ian D. (2014a). "The Convincing Ground, Portland Bay, Victoria, Australia: An Exploration of the Controversy Surrounding its Onomastic History". Names: A Journal of Onomastics. 62 (1): 3–12. doi:10.1179/0027773813Z.00000000059. hdl:1959.17/58446. S2CID 143416827.
- Clark, Ian D. (2014b). "Multiple Aboriginal placenames in western and central Victoria". In Clark, Ian D; Hercus, Luise; Kostanski, Laura (eds.). Indigenous and Minority Placenames: Australian and International Perspectives. Australian National University Press. pp. 239–250. ISBN 978-1-925-02163-9.
- Clarke, Anne (April 1994). "Romancing the Stones. The Cultural Construction of an Archaeological Landscape in the Western District of Victoria". Archaeology in Oceania. 29 (1): 1–17. doi:10.1002/arco.1994.29.1.1. JSTOR 40386978.
- Coutts, PJF; Frank, R. K.; Hughes, P.; Vanderwal, R. L. (1978). Aboriginal Engineers of the Western District, Victoria. Records of the Victorian Archaeological Survey. Aboriginal Affairs Victoria. ISSN 0158-9679.
- Critchett, Jan (1990) [First published 1988]. A 'distant field of murder': Western District frontiers, 1834–1848. Melbourne University Press. ISBN 978-0-522-84389-7 – via Internet Archive.
- Critchett, Jan (1998). Untold Stories: Memories and Lives of Victorian Kooris. Melbourne University Press. ISBN 978-0-522-84818-2.
- David, Bruno; Haberle, Simon G.; Walker, Donald (2012). "Peopled Landscapes: Archaeological and Biogeographic Approaches to Landscapes." (PDF). In Haberle, Simon G.; David, Bruno (eds.). Peopled landscapes: the impact of Peter Kershaw on Australian Quaternary science. Canberra: ANU E Press. pp. 3–23.
- Dawson, James (1881). Australian Aborigines: The Languages and Customs of Several Tribes of Aborigines in the Western District of Victoria, Australia (PDF). George Robertson – via Internet Archive.
- Dixon, R. M. W. (2002). Australian Languages: Their Nature and Development. Cambridge University Press. ISBN 978-0-521-47378-1.
- "Environment Protection and Biodiversity Conservation Act 1999: Inclusion of Places in the National Heritage List" (PDF). Commonwealth of Australia Gazette (P 7). 20 July 2004. ISSN 1032-2345.
- Griffiths, Tom (1996). Hunters and Collectors: The Antiquarian Imagination in Australia. Cambridge University Press. ISBN 978-0-521-48349-0.
- "The Gunditjmara People's native title determinations" (PDF). National Native Title Tribunal. 30 March 2007.
- Hiscock, Peter (2007). Archaeology of Ancient Australia. Routledge. ISBN 978-1-134-30440-0.
- Hone, J. Ann (1969). "Cecil Pybus Cooke (1813–1895)". Cooke, Cecil Pybus (1813–1895). Australian Dictionary of Biography. Vol. 3. Melbourne University Press.
- Hone, J. Ann (1974). "Charles Hamilton Macknight (1819–1873)". Macknight, Charles Hamilton (1819–1873). Australian Dictionary of Biography. Vol. 5. Melbourne University Press.
- Horton, Jessica (2015). "'Willing to fight to a man': The First World War and Aboriginal activism in the WesternDistrict of Victoria". Aboriginal History. 39: 203–222. doi:10.22459/AH.39.2015.10. JSTOR 43687042.
- Howitt, A. W. (1904). The Native Tribes of South-east Australia. Macmillan – via Internet Archive.
- "Indigenous Australians: Aboriginal and Torres Strait Islander people". Australian Institute of Aboriginal and Torres Strait Islander Studies. 21 March 2018.
- "Indigenous origins". North Melbourne Football Club. 29 May 2018.
- Johnson, Sian (19 January 2020b). "Budj Bim Cultural Landscape fire reveals new sections of ancient aquatic system". ABC News.
- Johnson, Sian (26 February 2020a). "Study dates Victorian volcano that buried a human-made axe". ABC News.
- Kershaw, Peter (17 August 2012). "Fifty years of Quaternary palynology in Australia". Ecological Society of Australia. Archived from the original on 20 March 2020.
- "Lake Condah". The Sydney Morning Herald. 8 February 2004.
- "Lake Condah Land Transfer". Agreements, Treaties and Negotiated Settlements (ATNS) project. 2011. Archived from the original on 13 February 2020.
- Massola, Aldo (1969). Journey to Aboriginal Victoria. Rigby.
- Matchan, Erin L.; Phillips, David; Jourdan, Fred; Oostingh, Korien (2020). "Early human occupation of southeastern Australia: New insights from 40Ar/39Ar dating of young volcanoes". Geology. 48 (4): 390–394. Bibcode:2020Geo....48..390M. doi:10.1130/G47166.1. ISSN 0091-7613. S2CID 214357121.
- Mathews, R. H. (1904). "Ethnological notes on the Aboriginal tribes of New South Wales and Victoria". Journal and Proceedings of the Royal Society of New South Wales. 38: 203–381. doi:10.5962/p.359439 – via Internet Archive.
- Moore, Michael T. (1974). "William Learmonth (1815–1889)". Learmonth, William (1815–1889). Australian Dictionary of Biography. Vol. 5. Melbourne University Press.
- "National Heritage Places - Budj Bim National Heritage Landscape". Dept of Agriculture, Water and the Environment.See also attached documents: National Heritage List Location and Boundary Map, and Government Gazette, 20 July 2004.
- Nolan, Kellee (28 July 2011). "Aborigines win native title". The Age.
- Pascoe, Bruce (2007). Convincing Ground: Learning to Fall in Love with Your Country. Aboriginal Studies Press. ISBN 978-0-855-75549-2.
- Pascoe, Bruce (2018). Dark Emu: Aboriginal Australia and the Birth of Agriculture. Magabala Books. pp. 85–86. ISBN 978-192124801-6.
- "Peter Kershaw". Google Scholar citations.
- Peterson, Nicolas; Long, Jeremy Phillip Merrick (1986). "Australian territorial organization: a band perspective". Oceania. Oceania Monographs. 30.
- Phillips, Graham (13 March 2003). "Life was not a walkabout for Victoria's Aborigines". The Age. Archived from the original on 12 May 2004.
- Raue, Ben (18 November 2017). "Northcote byelection: Greens' Lidia Thorpe takes Melbourne seat from Labor". The Guardian.
- Salleh, Anna (13 March 2003). "Aborigines may have and farmed eels, built huts". Australian Broadcasting Corporation.
- Saunders, Ken (10 August 2013). "A forgotten war, a haunted land". The Sydney Morning Herald.
- Shaw, A. G. L. (2003) [First published 1996]. A History of the Port Phillip District: Victoria Before Separation. Vol. 1. Melbourne University Press. ISBN 978-0-522-85064-2.
- Smyth, Robert Brough (1878). The Aborigines of Victoria: with notes relating to the habits of the Natives of Other Parts of Australia and Tasmania (PDF). Melbourne: John Ferres, Government Printer – via Internet Archive.
- Stichtenoth, Karen (May 2006). "Once were eel farmers". Monash Magazine. Melbourne.
- Tindale, Norman Barnett (1974). "Gunditjmara (VIC)". Aboriginal Tribes of Australia: Their Terrain, Environmental Controls, Distribution, Limits, and Proper Names. Australian National University Press. ISBN 978-0-708-10741-6. Archived from the original on 8 April 2017.
- Turner, Henry Gyles (2011) [First published 1904]. A History of the Colony of Victoria: From Its Discovery to Its Absorption into the Commonwealth of Australia. Vol. 1. Australian National University Press. ISBN 978-1-108-03982-6.
- Weir, Jessica Kate (2009). The Gunditjmara Land Justice Story (PDF). Monograph series (Australian Institute of Aboriginal and Torres Strait Islander Studies. Native Title Research Unit); no. 1/2009. AIATSIS. ISBN 978-085575439-6. ISSN 1835-7709. Archived from the original (PDF) on 21 March 2015.
- "WESLEYAN MISSIONARY MEETING". Launceston Advertiser. Tasmania, Australia. 11 November 1841. p. 3 – via Trove.
- Whelan, Melanie (12 June 2017). "Our Queen's Birthday Honours, 2017". The Courier.
