= Lake Condah Mission =

Aboriginal mission station in Victoria, Australia

Lake Condah Mission, also known as Condah Mission, was established in 1867 as a Church of England mission in Victoria, Australia. It is approximately 3 kilometres (1.9 mi) from Lake Condah—traditionally known as Tae Rak by the local Gunditjmara people—and about 20–25 kilometres (12–16 mi) south-east of Condah. The site of the mission, on 2,000 acres (810 ha) north of Darlot Creek, was formally reserved in 1869, and the Mission continued operations until the reserve was finally revoked in 1951, with most of the land handed over to the Soldiers Settlement Scheme to provide land for white veterans of World War II.

The area had been home to the Kerrup Jmara people, a Gunditjmara clan. The Mission lands were returned to the Gunditjmara on 1 January 1987. The Mission was mentioned in the Bringing Them Home Report (1997) as an institution that housed Indigenous Australian children removed from their families.

It is now part of several Budj Bim heritage areas, including the Budj Bim Cultural Landscape inscribed on the World Heritage List.

== Lake Condah ==
The Kerrup-Jmara ("people of the lake") are a clan of Gunditjmara Aboriginal people, who lived around the shores of the lake, then known as Tae Rak, for thousands of years pre-dating the arrival of Europeans, and had specific responsibility for it.

Lake Condah had first been happened upon by European settlers in 1841, when David Edgar and William Thompson Edgar were travelling through the area. Edgar gave it the name Lake Condon. Anglican pastoralist Cecil Pybus Cooke, who in 1849 acquired Lake Condah station, had changed the name of Lake Condon to Lake Condah in the mistaken belief that it meant "black swan", which lived on the lake. The Gunditjmara people were driven off their lands by the new settlers, and some were relocated to the Mission, although not without resistance, in the Eumeralla Wars.

== 1867: Establishment ==
Cooke had good relations with the local Gunditjmara people, which was partly why the land was selected by the Anglican Mission board for an Aboriginal mission. Cooke donated the land and £2,000 for the construction of an Anglican church, with the rest of the land (3,000 acres (1,200 ha) initially, but reduced to 2,000 acres (810 ha)), handed over by the government in 1867. The site, on 2,000 acres (810 ha) north of Darlot Creek, was formally reserved in 1869, the same year that the Central Board for the Protection of Aborigines was created by the Aboriginal Protection Act 1869. The location of the buildings was about 4 kilometres (2.5 mi) west of Lake Condah, off the Condah Estate Road. (Note: Note: The location is marked on the map linked to on World heritage Places - Budj Bim Cultural Landscape under the heading "Resources". On Google Maps about here; coords around 38°04'28.0"S 141°47'29.1"E)

The mission was overseen by the various incarnations of the Victorian Central Board Appointed to Watch Over the Interests of Aborigines (1860–1869), Central Board for the Protection of Aborigines, Colony of Victoria (1869–1900) and the Central Board for the Protection of Aborigines, State Government of Victoria (1901–1957).

The first missionary appointed to run the mission was Job Francis, a former Moravian missionary, who was appointed to oversee the removal of the inhabitants of the Framlingham Mission, most of whom, however, refused to move or moved and then returned to Framlingham. After a few changes of superintendent, another former Moravian missionary, Heinrich Stähle, took over in April 1875. He was considered a disciplinarian (and therefore a good superintendent), who kept the residents under strict control. He refused to allow them to work on neighbouring farms; he would not permit family members to move onto the Mission; and he considered rations as a reward rather than a right. The residents used grasses to make fish traps in order to supplement their diet. The mission language was English, and use of Aboriginal languages was frowned upon. Annual reports reveal that deaths outnumbered births at the mission; by 1905 the number of children was so low that the school was reduced to part-time operation.

There was a missionary cottage and kitchen, school, children's dormitory and storage building. A number of the buildings were weatherboard, but local bluestone (basalt) was also used build the houses, and the church (from 1883–1885). The church was named St Mary's, and consecrated by Ballarat Bishop Thornton in 1885. There were 26 buildings in total, with 15 acres (6.1 ha) cultivated. By 1871 there were about 80 residents, and by the late 1880s about 120.

== 1886: The Half-Caste Act ==
In 1886 the so-called Half-Caste Act 1886 was passed, which provided for the removal of "half-caste" (part-European) Aboriginal people from reserves. The Aborigines Act 1910 rescinded that decision, and many people returned.

In March 1898, the Church Mission Society handed over ownership of Lake Condah and Lake Tyers Missions to the Church Missionary Association. Government-appointed school teachers taught at the mission. After Stähle retired in 1913, an army captain acted as superintendent, before the mission closed at the end of 1918. Many residents of the mission responded to the call for volunteers for World War I, and at least eighteen young men died in service; however, upon the surviving veterans' return, their requests for land were refused. The last residents were transferred to Lake Tyers apart from four elderly people, who were allowed to remain under the supervision of the local police constable. The residents' request for the land to be handed over to them for farming was refused, and blocks of land were sold to [white] soldier settlers.

Former residents living in the area continued to attend the church and send their children to the mission school, which continued to operate until June 1948.

== 1950–51: Closure ==
In 1950 it was decided that the Mission would close, and the church and other facilities were destroyed to facilitate this. According to Noel Learmonth's Four Towns and a Survey: "Condah Mission Station Church, 1885. Destroyed 1950. Stones used to enlarge Church of England Hamilton and to pave cowyards". Other sources say that the church was demolished in 1957. The government wanted the Aboriginal people to move to the local towns of Hamilton, Warrnambool, Heywood and Portland; however some Gunditjmara people continued to live in the area until the late 1950s, mostly living off the land, catching fish and hunting for rabbits and other animals, which were sometimes sold.

In 1951, the reserve, with the exception of three small areas – the cemetery, the access road to it and an area of 43 acres (17 ha) comprising the mission buildings – was revoked and the land was handed over to the Soldiers Settlement Commission. The Gunditjmara who had served in the Australian Army during World War II were excluded from the claims for land – a repeat of what happened after World War I. These 43 acres were all that the people had left of the 2,043 acres (827 ha) originally allocated 83 years earlier by Queen Victoria, as compensation for the loss of their traditional lands.

== 1987: Return of the land ==
The mission lands were returned to Gunditjmara people, specifically the Kerrup-Jmara Elders Aboriginal Corporation, on 1 January 1987, following the Aboriginal Land (Lake Condah and Framlingham Forest) Act 1987, when the 53-hectare (130-acre) former reserve was vested to the Kerrup Jmara Elders Corporation. The transfer included "full management, control and enjoyment by the Kerrup-Jmara Elders Aboriginal Corporation of the land granted to it". The National Parks service and the Kerrup-Jmara people undertook a project in which part of the Mission was recreated, with buildings rebuilt, including tourist accommodation.

The Kerrup-Jmara Elders Corporation entered liquidation during the 1990s. The reserve was first handed to the Winda Mara Aboriginal Corporation to manage the lands, before they were vested to the Gunditj Mirring Traditional Owners Aboriginal Corporation (Registered Native Title Corporate) in March 2008 by the Commonwealth government. As of 2020, GMTOAC continue to hold and manage the land.

== 21st century: Heritage listing ==
The mission land was included in the area described as "The Mt Eccles Lake Condah Area: About 7880ha, 6km south west of Macarthur, comprising Mount Eccles National Park, Stones State Faunal Reserve, Muldoons Aboriginal Land, Allambie Aboriginal Land and Condah Mission", which was declared part of the Budj Bim National Heritage Landscape in July 2004 under the Environment Protection and Biodiversity Conservation Act 1999.

On 6 July 2019, the Mission was included in Budj Bim Cultural Landscape, which was designated a UNESCO World Heritage Site on that date.

== See also ==
- Royal Commission on the Aborigines (1877)

== Legacy ==
Lake Condah Mission Station was mentioned in the Bringing Them Home Report (1997) as an institution that housed Indigenous children removed from their families.
