= Tyrendarra =

- Town
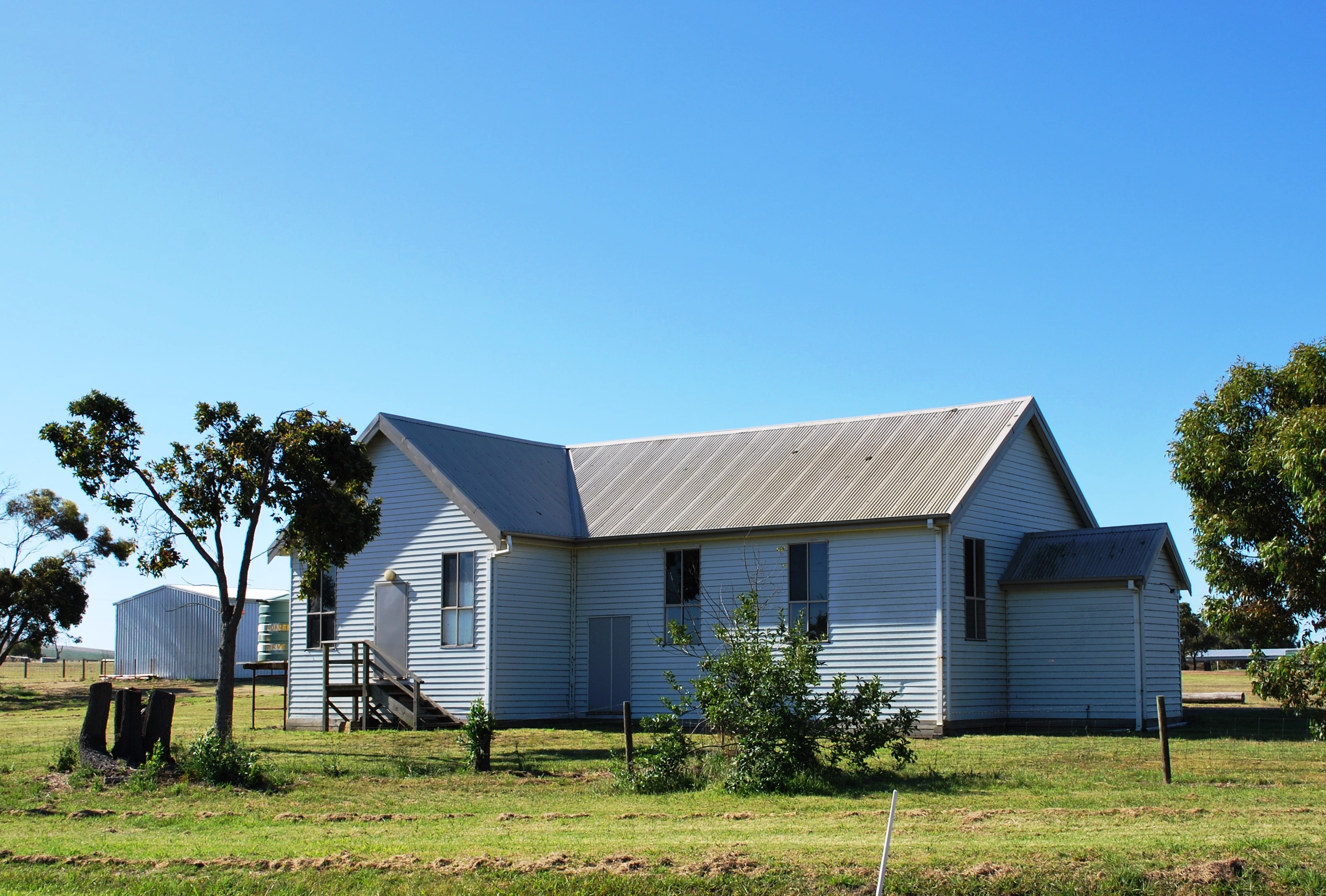
- Hall in the showgrounds at Tyrendarra

- Coordinates: 38°13′0″S 141°47′0″E
- Country: Australia
- State: Victoria
- LGA: Shire of Glenelg
- Location: 334 km (208 mi) SW of Melbourne; 72 km (45 mi) W of Warrnambool; 32 km (20 mi) NE of Portland

Government
  - State electorate: South-West Coast
  - Federal division: Wannon

Population
  - Total: 198 (2021 census)
- Postcode: 3285

Tyrendarra (/ˈtɪərəndərə/) is a locality in south west Victoria, Australia. The locality is split between the Shire of Glenelg and the Shire of Moyne local government areas, with most being in the former. It is on the Princes Highway, 338 kilometres (210 mi) south west of the state capital, Melbourne. The Tyrendarra township lies within a bend of Darlot Creek, before it enters the Fitzroy River—which also flows through the locality.

At the 2021 census, Tyrendarra and the surrounding area had a population of 198.

The area was settled in the 1870s and a Post Office opened around February 1879 and closed in 2000.

Tyrendarra is well known for the Tyrendarra Pastoral and Agricultural show held each year at the Tyrendarra sports reserve. The Tyrendarra Rodeo has, since 2017, been replaced with the Tyrendarra Beer Fest.

The town has an Australian rules football team playing in the South West District Football League.

Unusually for Australian towns, Tyrendarra has no hotel. The town does, however, contain two churches.

The Tyrendarra Indigenous Protected Area, which lies on the Tyrendarra lava flow from the extinct volcano Budj Bim lies between the Fitzroy River and Darlot Creek close to the township.

== Traditional ownership ==
The formally recognised traditional owners for the area in which Tyrendarra sits are the Gunditjmara People who are represented by the Gunditj Mirring Traditional Owners Aboriginal Corporation.

== People from Tyrendarra ==
- Noel Fulford Learmonth, (1880–1970) writer
- Noel's son Wing Commander Charles Learmonth, (1917–1944) DFC and bar
