= Condah =

Condah Victoria
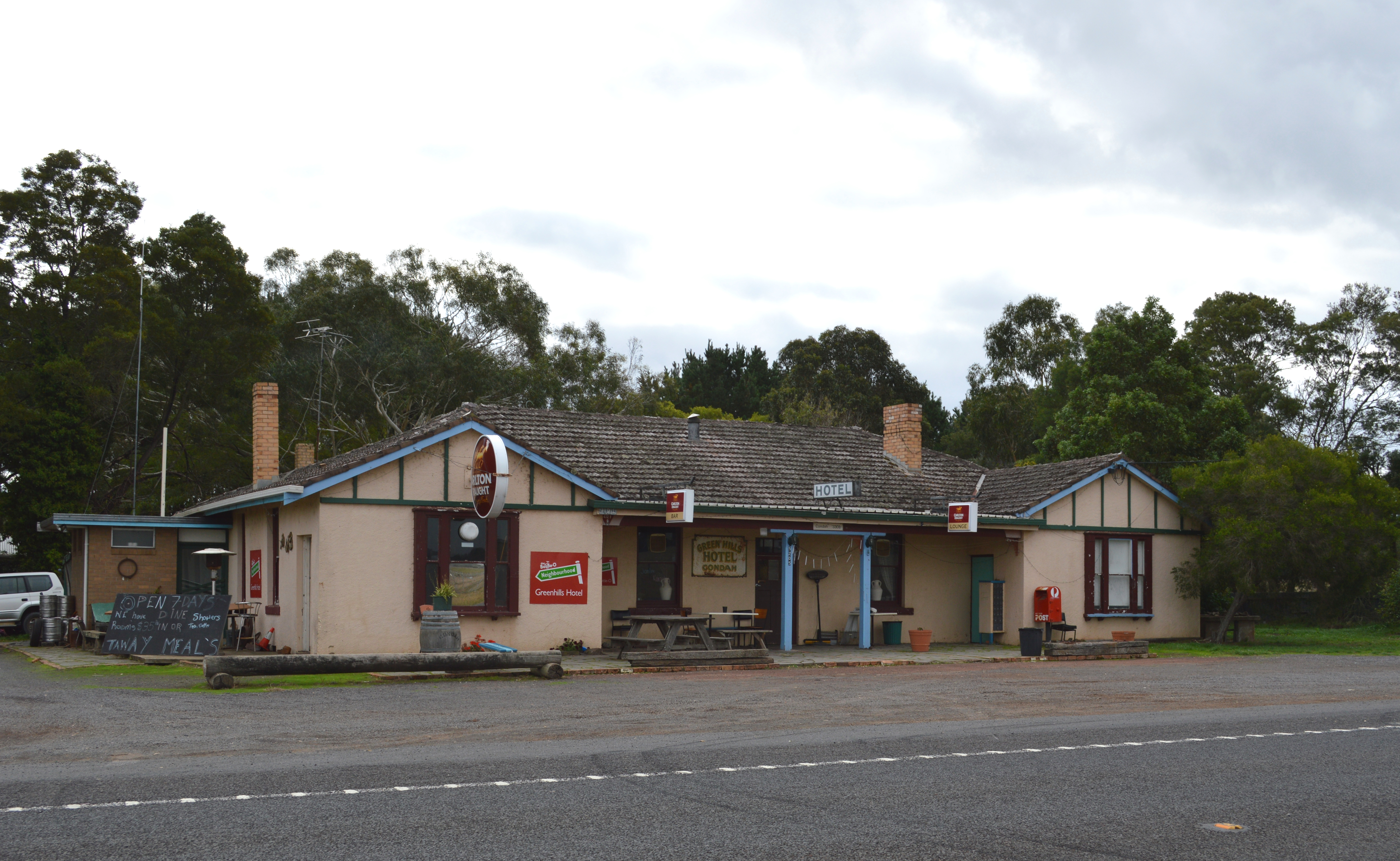
- Green Hills Hotel at Condah

- Coordinates: 37°58′0″S 141°44′0″E
- Population: 121 (2016 census)
- Postcode(s): 3303
- Location: 334 km (208 mi) W of Melbourne; 47 km (29 mi) N of Portland; 38 km (24 mi) SW of Hamilton; 20 km (12 mi) NE of Heywood
- LGA(s): Shire of Glenelg
- State electorate(s): South-West Coast
- Federal division(s): Wannon

Condah /ˈkɒndɑː/ is a small town in south west Victoria, Australia and is located on the Henty Highway north of Heywood. At the 2006 census, Condah and the surrounding area had a population of 272.

It is about 20 kilometres (12 mi) to 25 kilometres (16 mi) north-west of Lake Condah, Budj Bim National Park and Budj Bim.

== History ==
- Condah Pub has been open since 1854 and still thrives today.
- A cemetery was set aside in May 1863.
- Condah Post Office opened on 12 May 1868 and closed in 2001.
- Two churches were opened, one Anglican in 1883, one Presbyterian in 1908.

== Traditional ownership ==
The formally recognised traditional owners for the area in which Condah sits are the Gunditjmara People who are represented by the Gunditj Mirring Traditional Owners Aboriginal Corporation.

== Notable people ==
- W J (Billy) Millard, the winner of the inaugural 1878 Stawell Gift was a resident of Condah;
- Andrew Lovett, Wally Lovett, Glenn Lovett and Nathan Lovett-Murray, all AFL football players, are Gunditjmara people either from Lake Condah or have relatives in the area.
