= Budj Bim heritage areas =

UNESCO World Heritage Site in Victoria, Australia

Budj Bim Cultural Landscape
UNESCO World Heritage Site
- Location within Victoria
- Location: Victoria, Australia
- Criteria: Cultural: iii, v
- Reference: 1577
- Inscription: 2019 (43rd Session)
- Area: 9,935 hectares (24,550 acres)
- Coordinates: 38°05′S 141°54′E

Australian National Heritage List
- Official name: Budj Bim National Heritage Landscape
- Type: National heritage (landscape)
- Designated: 20 July 2004
- Reference no.: 105673
- Class: Indigenous
- Legal Status: Listed place
- List: National Heritage List

Budj Bim heritage areas includes several protected areas in Victoria, Australia, the largest two being Budj Bim National Heritage Landscape and the Budj Bim Cultural Landscape. Within the latter, there are three Indigenous Protected Areas: the Tyrendarra Indigenous Protected Area, Kurtonitj Indigenous Protected Area, and the Lake Condah Indigenous Protected Area.

All of the protected areas are related to the volcanic landscape created by the eruption of Budj Bim (Mount Eccles) more than 30,000 years ago, and the dormant volcano is included in the National Heritage and World Heritage sites (which also include Budj Bim National Park). The various areas are of great historic and cultural significance to various clans of the Gunditjmara, the local Aboriginal people: Budj Bim features in their mythology as a creator-being, and the Gunditjmara people developed an extensive system of aquaculture on the land created by the lava flows up to 8,000 years ago. Tae Rak (Lake Condah) forms part of the wetlands, and its English name is remembered for the Lake Condah Mission which was established a few kilometres away in 1867.

Budj Bim National Heritage Landscape was added to the National Heritage List on 20 July 2004, and Budj Bim Cultural Landscape was designated a UNESCO World Heritage Site on 6 July 2019. The land is owned and managed by Gunditj Mirring Traditional Owners Aboriginal Corporation, a Registered Aboriginal Party, along with various other bodies involved in landcare.

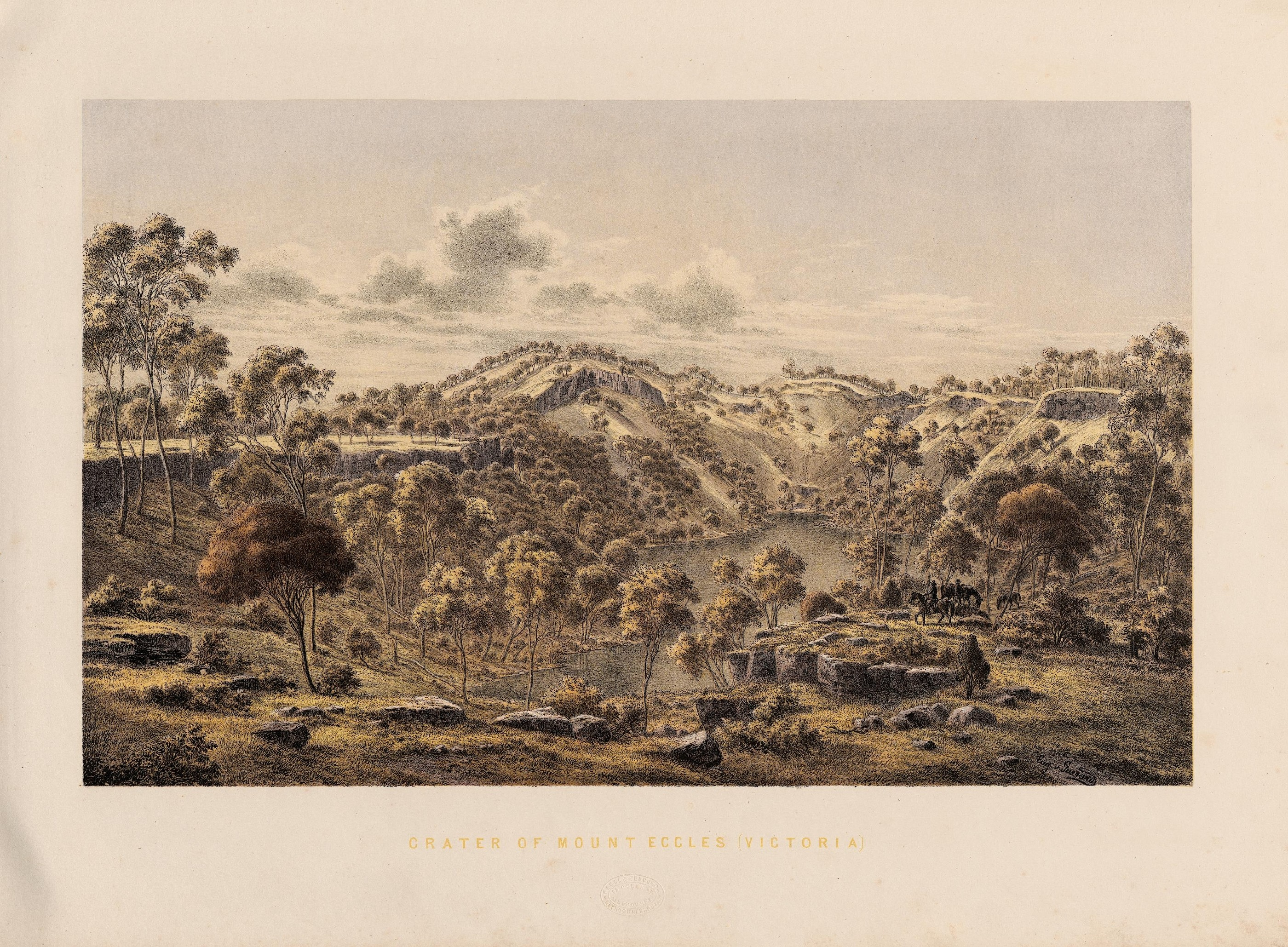
Crater of Budj Bim (then known as Mount Eccles)

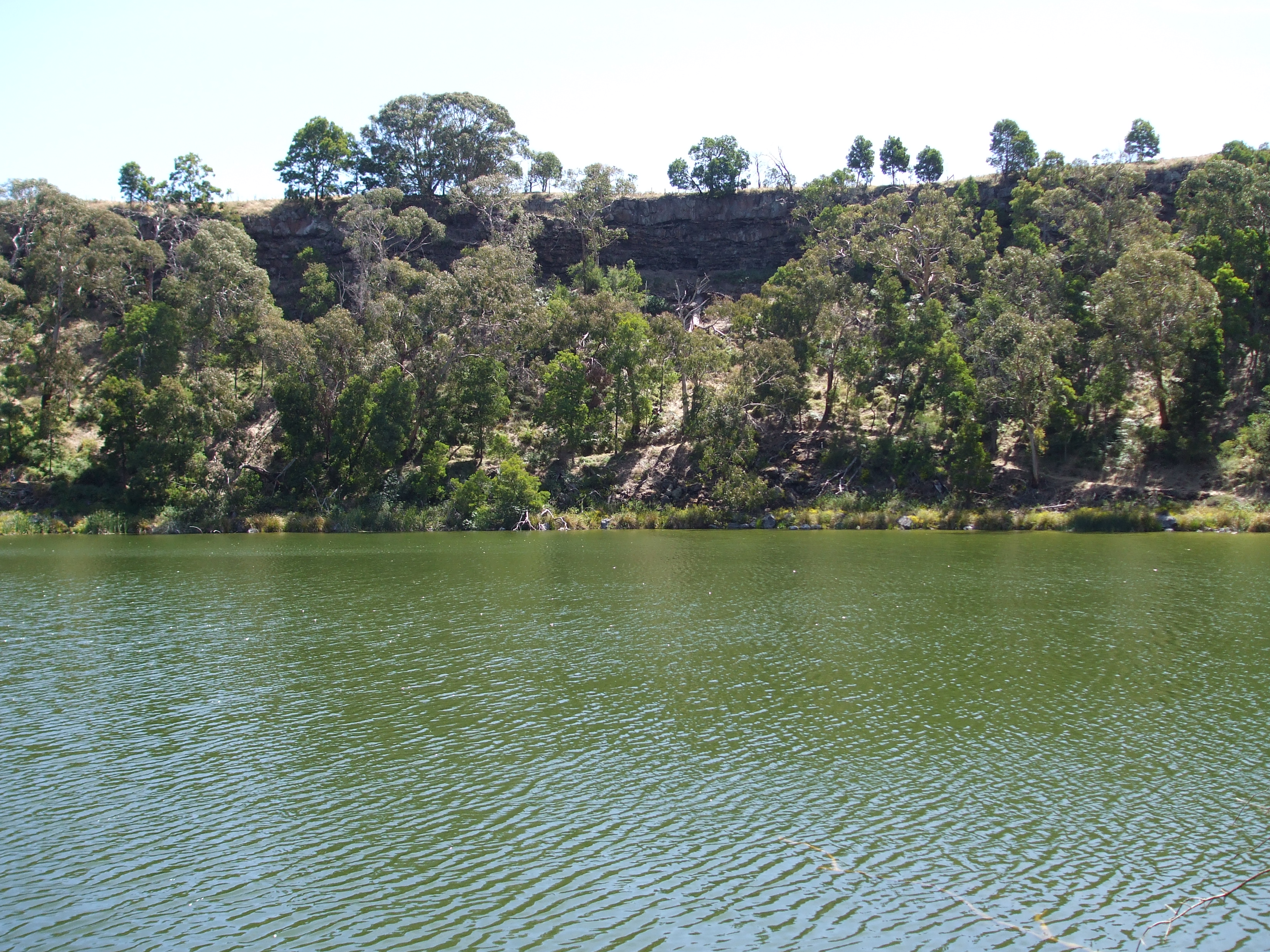
Lake Surprise, Budj Bim—Mt Eccles National Park

== Historic and cultural significance ==
=== Volcanic eruption ===
The creation story of the local Gunditjmara people is based on the eruption of Budj Bim (Mount Eccles) more than 30,000 years ago. It was via this event that an ancestral creator-being known as Budj Bim was revealed. Budj Bim's eruption was dated at within 3,100 years either side of 36,900 years BP, and nearby Tower Hill similarly dated, in early 2020. Significantly, owing to the presence of human artefacts found under volcanic ash at Tower Hill, this is a "minimum age constraint for human presence in Victoria", and also could be interpreted as evidence for the Gunditjmara oral histories which tell of volcanic eruptions being some of the oldest oral traditions in existence.

=== Eel traps ===
The Tyrendarra lava flow changed the drainage pattern of the region, and created large wetlands. From some thousands of years before European settlement in the area in the early 19th century (one of five eel trap systems at Lake Condah has been carbon dated to 6,600 years old), the Gunditjmara clans had developed a system of aquaculture which channelled the water of the Darlot Creek into adjacent lowlying areas trapping short-finned eels (or kooyang in Gunditjmara) and other fish in a series of weirs, dams and channels. This provided a year-round supply of eels which were harvested with woven traps and often smoked in hollows of the manna gum (Eucalyptus viminalis), and permitted a forager (hunter-gatherer) society to develop into a settled society constructing permanent stone dwellings. The engineered wetlands provided the basis to sustain large groups of people to dwell permanently in the vicinity.

The first European to see the traps was Chief Protector of Aborigines in Port Phillip district, George Augustus Robinson, in July 1841. He reported "an immense piece of ground trenched and banked, resembling the work of civilized man but which on inspection I found to be the work of the Aboriginal natives, purposefully constructed for catching eels", in a swampy area near Mount William, within the Grampians National Park in south-western Victoria. He estimated that the area covered at least 15 acres (6.1 ha). The evidence was buried or ignored for 135 years, until Peter Coutts of the Victoria Archaeological Survey carried out surveys at Lake Condah (Tae Rak), altogether different terrain, in the 1970s. He found extensive fish-trapping systems, with hundreds of metres of excavated channels and dozens of basalt block dam walls, the volume of which he estimated at "many hundreds of tonnes". Europeans constructed drainage channels in the 1880s and 1950s, but in 1977 heavy rains revealed more of the original work, as well as house foundations made of basalt blocks. Dating the use of channels by various means and different people put them at up to 8,000 years old.

Harry Lourandos, researcher from the University of Sydney, investigated a huge Aboriginal fish trap at Toolondo, 110 kilometres (68 mi) north of Lake Condah, which he named "eel farms". In the 1990s and 2000s, 3D computer maps recreated the channels, showing that the stone walls were built across the lava flow to form a complex system of artificial ponds to hold floodwaters and eels at different stages of growth. Researcher Heather Builth called the systems "aquaculture". The discovery of these large-scale farming techniques and manipulation of the landscape, highlighted in Bruce Pascoe's best-selling book Dark Emu in 2014, shows that the Indigenous inhabitants were not only hunter gatherers, but cultivators and farmers. The work of Peter Kershaw, noted palynologist at Monash University, suggested that the complex was about 8000 years BP.

After the 2019-2020 Australian bushfires had burnt more than 7,000 hectares (17,000 acres) around Lake Condah and in the Budj Bim National Park, further areas of aquaculture, previously concealed under vegetation, were revealed, in an area known as the Muldoon trap complex. A smaller system, including a channel of about 25 metres (82 ft) long had been hidden in the long grass and other vegetation. A further cultural heritage survey is planned, in collaboration with archaeologists familiar with the site and local Indigenous rangers.

=== Frontier wars ===
After European settlement began in western Victoria from the late 1830s, attempts to colonise the Gunditjmara led to the Eumeralla Wars, which did not conclude until the 1860s. The rocks and uneven land of the lava flow gave the Gunditjmara some advantage, as the terrain was unsuited to horses. However, many Aboriginal people were killed, and the rest displaced. The Victorian Government created Aboriginal reserves to house them; some were moved to Lake Condah Mission after establishment in 1867.

=== Lake Condah ===
The Kerrup-Jmara ("people of the lake") are a clan of Gunditjmara Aboriginal people, who lived around the shores of the lake, which they called Tae Rak, for thousands of years pre-dating the arrival of Europeans, and had specific responsibility for it.

Lake Condah was first happened upon by European settlers in 1841, when David Edgar and William Thompson Edgar were travelling through the area. Edgar gave it the name Lake Condon. Anglican pastoralist Cecil Pybus Cooke, who in 1849 acquired Lake Condah station, changed the name of Lake Condon to Lake Condah in the mistaken belief that it meant "black swan", which lived on the lake. The lake itself is a shallow basin, about 4 kilometres (2.5 mi) in length and 1 kilometre (0.62 mi) wide.

In March 2008, Lake Condah was returned to Gunditjmara people. The Lake Condah Restoration Conservation Management Plan was completed in a way that ensured that cultural heritage values were maintained, and works were completed in 2010, winning the Civil Contractors Federation Earth Award.

=== The Mission ===
The Lake Condah Mission was established in 1867 as a Church of England mission, approximately 3 kilometres (1.9 mi) from Lake Condah, which had been home to the Kerrupjmara people, after displaced Gunditjmara refused to move from their traditional lands. The site, on 2,000 acres (810 ha) north of Darlot Creek, was formally reserved in 1869, the same year that the Victorian Central Board for the Protection of Aborigines was created by the Aboriginal Protection Act 1869. The mission was overseen by the various incarnations of the Central Board. In 1886 the Half-Caste Act 1886 was passed, which provided for the removal of "half-caste" (part-European) Aboriginal people from reserves. The Aborigines Act 1910 rescinded that decision, and many people returned.

Local bluestone was used build the houses and the church (from 1883 to 1885), named St Mary's. There were 26 buildings in total, with 15 acres (6.1 ha) cultivated. By 1871 there were about 80 residents, and by the late 1880s about 120.

The mission closed at the end of 1918. The last residents were transferred to Lake Tyers Mission apart from four elderly people. The residents' request for the land to be handed over to them for farming was refused, and blocks of land were sold to [white] soldier settlers. Former residents living in the area continued to attend the church and send their children to the mission school, which continued to operate until June 1948.

In 1950 it was decided that the Mission would close, and the church and other facilities were destroyed to facilitate this. According to Noel Learmonth's Four Towns and a Survey: "Condah Mission Station Church, 1885. Destroyed 1950. Stones used to enlarge Church of England Hamilton and to pave cowyards". Other sources say that the church was demolished in 1957.

Lake Condah Mission Station was mentioned in the Bringing Them Home Report (1997) as an institution that housed Indigenous children removed from their families.

==== Mission land ====
On 1 January 1987, the mission lands were returned to Gunditjmara people, specifically the Kerrup-Jmara Elders Aboriginal Corporation, following the Aboriginal Land (Lake Condah and Framlingham Forest) Act 1987, when the 53-hectare (130-acre) former reserve was vested to the Kerrup Jmara Elders Corporation. The transfer included "full management, control and enjoyment by the Kerrup-Jmara Elders Aboriginal Corporation of the land granted to it". The Parks Australia and the Kerrup-Jmara people undertook a project in which part of the Mission was recreated, with buildings rebuilt, including tourist accommodation.

The Kerrup-Jmara Elders Corporation entered liquidation during the 1990s. The reserve was first handed to the Winda Mara Aboriginal Corporation to manage the lands, before they were vested to the Gunditj Mirring Traditional Owners Aboriginal Corporation in March 2008 by the Commonwealth government. As of 2020, GMTOAC continue to hold and manage the land.

The mission land was included in "The Mt Eccles Lake Condah Area: About 7880ha, 6 km south west of Macarthur, comprising Mount Eccles National Park, Stones State Faunal Reserve, Muldoons Aboriginal Land, Allambie Aboriginal Land and Condah Mission", which was declared part of the Budj Bim National Heritage Landscape in July 2004 under the Environment Protection and Biodiversity Conservation Act 1999.

== Protected areas ==
=== Indigenous Protected Areas (IPAs) ===
Indigenous Protected Areas (IPAs) are "areas of land and sea managed by Indigenous groups as protected areas for biodiversity conservation through voluntary agreements with the Australian Government".

The Peters property (between the Fitzroy River and Darlot Creek) was purchased by the Gunditj Mirring Traditional Owners Aboriginal Corporation (GMTOAC) in May 2010 (after some years' leasehold), and the Kurtonitj wetlands to the north was acquired by the Corporation in September 2009. In 2018, GMTOAC combined its properties under the Budj Bim Indigenous Protected Area Plan of Management. GTMOAC is a Registered Aboriginal Party (RAP). The Aboriginal Heritage Act 2006 and Aboriginal Heritage Regulations 2018 provide the framework within Registered Aboriginal Parties (the approximate equivalent to Aboriginal land councils in other states) such as GMTOAC operate in Victoria.

There are two IPAs within the Budj Bim National Heritage Landscape (National Heritage List): Mt Eccles – Lake Condah in the northerly section, and Tyrendarra in the southerly section. The third IPA mentioned below, Kurtonitj, was rejected by the Australian Heritage Council in September 2014 as a candidate for the NHL, on the grounds that its "distinctive heritage features...are better represented in the National Heritage values of the existing Budj Bim National Heritage Landscape - Mt Eccles Lake Condah Area (included in the National Heritage List in 2004)". Also considered, but excluded on similar grounds at the same time, was the Peters Property.

Three IPAs are included in the UNESCO World Heritage Listing Budj Bim Cultural Landscape (see below): Mt Eccles – Lake Condah, Tyrendarra and Kurtonitj, 2,700 hectares (6,700 acres) of culturally significant land within the Budj Bim Cultural Landscape includes the "Peters, Kurtonitj, Lake Condah Mission, Lake Condah, Allambie and Lake Gorrie properties" (i.e. excluding Tyrendarra, which is managed by Winda-Mara). The land in all three IPAs are managed by the Budj Bim Rangers of the Winda-Mara Aboriginal Corporation's Land Management Unit. Winda-Mara is a community-controlled organisation focussed on health, education and employment opportunities for Indigenous people in south-western Victoria, which runs several conservation and tourism initiatives in partnership with GTMOAC, as well as other Government and non-Government agencies.

==== Tyrendarra IPA (2003) ====
The Tyrendarra, an area of 248 hectares (610 acres) on Darlot Creek, a tributary of Lake Condah, was dedicated in December 2003.

The Winda-Mara Aboriginal Corporation was appointed to manage the Indigenous heritage values as well as land and resource management activities of the land. The management of the IPA has focused on reinstating the pre-1840s wetlands system, supporting regrowth of the manna gum woodland, managing weeds and feral animals, and "establishing an eel aquaculture industry as a sustainable business venture". Activities such as upgrading infrastructure, building boardwalks and interpretative signs, and replanting trees and shrubs are undertaken. Thousands of newly planted trees and grasses were destroyed by bushfires in 2006, as well as 90 per cent of the property's vegetation.

The IPA is managed in line with International Union for Conservation of Nature (IUCN) Category VI - "Managed Resource Protected Area: Protected Area managed mainly for the sustainable use of natural ecosystems".

The region is a traditional meeting place and camping area for the Gunditjmara people and the land is part of major Dreaming trails and an important ceremonial site. Tyrendarra IPA forms part of the Budj Bim National Heritage Landscape (NHL - see below), listed in July 2004 for its significant Indigenous heritage values under the Environment Protection and Biodiversity Conservation Act 1999.

==== Lake Condah IPA (2010) ====
Lake Condah IPA was dedicated in 2010, and covers 1,700 hectares (4,200 acres), which includes the properties of Lake Condah, Allambie, Muldooons and Vaughans. Situated right next to the lava flows found in Budj Bim National Park in south-west Victoria, the IPA includes significant wetlands. It is home to significant species such as the tiger quoll, the great egret and the powerful and barking owls. The Kerrup Gunditj clan in this area engineered an extensive aquaculture system at Lake Condah thousands of years ago. Other Gunditjmara clans in the area worked with them to establish kooyang (eel) trapping and farming systems and to develop the smoking techniques to preserve their harvest.

The Budj Bim Rangers maintain the land, protecting cultural heritage sites, managing revegetation and weed eradication projects.

Lake Condah IPA is included in "The Mt Eccles Lake Condah Area: About 7880ha, 6 km south west of Macarthur, comprising Mount Eccles National Park, Stones State Faunal Reserve, Muldoons Aboriginal Land, Allambie Aboriginal Land and Condah Mission", which was declared part of the Budj Bim National Heritage Landscape in July 2004, along with Tyrendarra, under the Environment Protection and Biodiversity Conservation Act 1999.

==== Kurtonitj IPA (2009) ====
Kurtonitj means "crossing place", and is sacred to the Gunditjmara people. Kurtonitj IPA was dedicated in 2009, and comprises 353 hectares (870 acres) of wetland. The landscape has been formed by deep freshwater marshes and seasonally-flooded shallow marshes. Kurtonitj is bordered on the west by Darlots Creek (known as Kallara in Gunditjmara). Kooyang and brolgas are just two of the species which rely on the management of the land by Budj Bim rangers to ensure optimum conditions for their survival.

Containing ancient stone kooyang (eel) traps and channels (including a 300 metres (980 ft) by 150 metres (490 ft) area of lava flow featuring two weirs and a dam for trapping and holding kooyang), sites of former dwellings and trees for smoking kooyang, Kurtonitj is since 2019 part of the World Heritage Listing. Educational and interpretative signs, boardwalks and a reconstruction of a stone village are in the pipeline.

=== Budj Bim National Heritage Landscape (NHL, 2004) ===
The Budj Bim National Heritage Landscape, which includes both the Tyrendarra Area (Place ID 105678, about 275 hectares (680 acres), 2 kilometres (1.2 mi) north of Tyrendarra) and the Mt Eccles Lake Condah Area (Place ID 105673, about 7,880 hectares (19,500 acres), 6 kilometres (3.7 mi) south-west of Macarthur, comprising Budj Bim National Park (formerly Mt Eccles National Park), Stones State Faunal Reserve, Muldoons Aboriginal Land, Allambie Aboriginal Land and Condah Mission) was added to the National Heritage List on 20 July 2004, under the Environment Protection and Biodiversity Conservation Act 1999.

==== Land management ====
The Winda-Mara Aboriginal Corporation's Land Management Unit is responsible for over 3,000 hectares (7,400 acres) of Aboriginal-owned land, which spans at least 10 culturally significant properties and all included within the Budj Bim National Heritage Landscape. Their team of Indigenous Rangers, the Budj Bim Rangers, are responsible for all land management activities, such as protection of cultural sites, weed and pest control, maintenance of facilities and assets as well as environmental works, revegetation, fence maintenance and livestock management. Winda-Mara partners with Gunditj Mirring Traditional Owners and other agencies on the following projects as of March 2020:

- The Lake Condah Sustainable Development Project, begun in 2002, with the Budj Bim Sustainable Development Partnership launched in 2012.
- The Bessiebelle Sheepwash & Yards Restoration Project
- The Budj Bim Eco Village Feasibility Project
- The Budj Bim Trails Project

=== Budj Bim Cultural Landscape (WHL, 2019) ===
The Budj Bim Cultural Landscape was added to the UNESCO World Heritage List on 6 July 2019. The boundaries of this protected area are those of Budj Bim National Park, Budj Bim Indigenous Protected Area, Tyrendarra Indigenous Protected Area and Lake Condah Mission. It is described as a serial property with three components: Budj Bim (northern) component, Kurtonitj (central) component (which is included in the existing Budj Bim National Heritage Landscape - Mt Eccles Lake Condah Area) and Tyrendarra (southern) component. Each of these areas contains extensive evidence of the aquaculture system developed by the Gunditjmara, who have customary rights and obligations to their country and a continuing relationship with the Budj Bim Cultural Landscape. The three areas are connected by the lava flow from Budj Bim, which is regarded as an Ancestral Being.

According to UNESCO, the network is one of the oldest and most extensive aquaculture systems on earth.

In its summary of reasons for its "outstanding universal value", UNESCO says "Budj Bim Cultural Landscape is the result of a creational process narrated by the Gunditjmara as a deep time story. For the Gunditjmara, deep time refers to the idea that they have always been there. From an archaeological perspective, deep time refers to a period of at least 32,000 years that Aboriginal people have lived in the Budj Bim Cultural Landscape. The ongoing dynamic relationship of Gunditjmara and their land is nowadays carried by knowledge systems retained through oral transmission and continuity of cultural practice.

Under Criterion (iii), the report says "The Budj Bim Cultural Landscape bears an exceptional testimony to the cultural traditions, knowledge, practices and ingenuity of the Gunditjmara. The extensive networks and antiquity of the constructed and modified aquaculture system of the Budj Bim Cultural Landscape bears testimony to the Gunditjmara as engineers and kooyang fishers".

Under Criterian (v): "The continuing cultural landscape of the Budj Bim Cultural Landscape is an outstanding representative example of human interaction with the environment and testimony to the lives of the Gunditjmara...The Budj Bim Cultural Landscape exemplifies the dynamic ecological-cultural relationships evidenced in the Gunditjmara's deliberate manipulation and management of the environment".

It goes on to list elements of integrity and authenticity of the site, describing it as "free of major threats and...sufficient in size to illustrate the ways multiple systems – social, spiritual, geological, hydrological and ecological – interact and function" and that its "high degree of authenticity"is shown by "Gunditjmara traditional knowledge...demonstrated by millennia of oral transmission, through continuity of practice and is supported by documented Gunditjmara cultural traditions and exceptionally well-preserved archaeological, environmental and historical evidence" and "continuing connection of the Gunditjmara to their landscape and their traditional and historical knowledge of the life cycle of kooyang".

==== Administration ====
In the December 2017 nomination by the Commonwealth Government for World Heritage status, the administrative arrangements for monitoring the various aspects of the whole area were listed. The Budj Bim Cultural Landscape World Heritage Steering Committee would oversee and coordinate all other agencies involved. The Department of the Environment and Energy (now the Department of Agriculture, Water and the Environment) are the custodians of the Budj Bim National Heritage Landscape (NHL). The Environment Protection and Biodiversity Conservation Act 1999 requires that any significant damage or threat to the value of listed places is reported at least once in every 5-year period. Other involved agencies would be the Government of Victoria's Department of Environment, Land, Water and Planning, the Glenelg Hopkins Catchment Management Authority (all relating to the Budj Bim National Park area only), the Gunditj Mirring Traditional Owners Aboriginal Corporation (National Park, Budj Bim IPA, and Lake Condah Mission) and the Winda-Mara Aboriginal Corporation (Tyrendarra IPA).

All of the Budj Bim Cultural Landscape is Aboriginal-owned and/or managed, and is managed in a way that respects the customary and legal rights and obligations of the owners. All Gunditjmara cultural heritage on the land is protected by Victoria's Aboriginal Heritage Act 2006. It is possible that the area may be expanded in the future.

== Recent history ==
During the 2019-2020 Australian bushfire season, fires broke out within the Cultural Heritage Landscape. The stone fish traps and the stone house site were unaffected by fire, and fortunately the fires were quickly contained, partly due to mild weather conditions and partly by the efforts of firefighters. Lake Condah and Condah Mission were not directly affected by the fires. After the fires burnt had more than 7,000 hectares (17,000 acres) around Lake Condah and in the National Park, further areas of aquaculture were revealed (see above).

In the National Park, the campground and picnic area reopened from 29 February 2020, but the Lake Surprise walking track and access to Tunnel Cave were closed due to the impact of the fires. As of 19 March 2020, the Crater Rim Walk and Lava Canal Walk are open, but re-routed near Tunnel Cave.

In May 2021, over 1,100 feral pigs and fallow deer were culled by shooting them from a helicopter. With the damage to the landscape from the 2019–2020 fires still not repaired, an excess of hoofed animals was causing widespread destruction. The cull was part of the implementation of an integrated pest control project by the Victorian Department of Environment, Land, Water and Planning (DELWP), Gunditj Mirring Traditional Owners Aboriginal Corporation, Parks Victoria and the Winda-Mara Aboriginal Corporation since the bushfires.

== See also ==
- Australian Aboriginal culture
