= Royal Commission on the Aborigines =

Royal Commission on the Aborigines may refer to:

- Royal Commission on the Aborigines (1877), a royal commission in Victoria, Australia
- Royal Commission on the Aborigines (1913), a royal commission in South Australia
