= Lake Tyers Mission =

Aboriginal mission on the shores of Lake Tyers, Victoria, Australia (1863-1971

Lake Tyers Mission Victoria
- Coordinates: 37.839363°S 148.099066°E
- Postcode(s): 3909
- Location: 321 km (199 mi) E of Melbourne; 40 km (25 mi) SE of Bairnsdale
- LGA(s): Shire of East Gippsland
- State electorate(s): Gippsland East
- Federal division(s): Gippsland
Mean max temp	Mean min temp	Annual rainfall
22.1 °C; 72 °F	12.3 °C; 54 °F	711.2 mm 28 in

Lake Tyers Mission, also known as Bung Yarnda, was an Aboriginal mission established in 1863 on the shore of Lake Tyers in Victoria's Gippsland, region as a centralised location for Aboriginal people from around Victoria.

== History ==
The Lake Tyers Mission Station was established by the Church of England missionary Reverend John Bulmer in 1863 following decades of conflict between the Kurnai people and white settlers in Gippsland. Bulmer had previously sought to establish a mission south of Buchan in 1861, but moved south to the coast with the few Aboriginal survivors of the conflict. The chosen site was on a peninsula, with a lake on each side, known to traditional owners as Bung Yarnda. In the early twentieth century, Aboriginal people from a number of other Victorian missions, including Ramahyuck, Lake Condah and Coranderrk, were relocated to Lake Tyers. The Ramahyuck Mission (established in 1863 by Reverend Friedrich Hagenauer on the Avon River near Lake Wellington) was closed in 1908 and the Ganai survivors from west and central Gippsland were moved to Lake Tyers. The Ebenezer Mission was closed in 1904 due to low numbers and in the following twenty years many Wergaia people from north-western Victoria were forcibly moved to Lake Tyers. Lake Tyers was taken over by the Victorian Government in 1908.

In 1916 the Government of Victoria decided to concentrate Aboriginal people from across Victoria at Lake Tyers, with the Aboriginal Protection Board establishing a policy in 1917 to concentrate all "full-blood" and "half-caste" Aboriginal people on the Lake Tyers reserve. In 1957 the Board for the Protection of Aborigines was abolished, and in the 1960s the Victorian Government decided to try to close the settlement, and assimilate residents into the general community. Some were moved to distant parts of the state, but not necessarily their traditional lands.

Protests in the 1950s and 1960s for an independent, Aboriginal-run farming cooperative at Lake Tyers received support and assistance from the Aborigines Advancement League in Melbourne. Pastor Sir Doug Nicholls campaigned on their behalf, but when the Board moved to close Lake Tyers, Nicholls resigned his position in protest. In 1965, however, the mission was declared a Permanent Reserve.

In 1970 the Aboriginal Lands Act 1970 was passed by the Parliament of Victoria, the first Act to recognise land rights for Aboriginal people in Victoria, which handed ownership of Framlingham in western Victoria to an Aboriginal trust on 1 July 1971. Along with Lake Tyers, Framlingham was the last reserve to close in Victoria. In 1971 the remaining Lake Tyers residents, then only numbering a couple of hundred, were granted freehold title to the remaining 237 hectares (2.37 km^{2}) as part of a self-governing community under the Lake Tyers Aboriginal Trust, with each adult and child receiving a parcel of shares.

The Aborigines Advancement League had previously expressed concern for the loss of Aboriginal land in 1948, when it told the government that "land titles of Lake Tyers must be transferred with due precaution in the matter of safeguard to prevent any attempted dispossession of the Aborigines and mixed bloods by any person". Shortly after, Laurie Moffatt explained as a spokesman for Lake Tyers residents:

We do not want to see Lake Tyers finally sold to the white man in the same way as Ramahyuck, Condah, Ebenezer Mission and Coranderrk Reserves have been sold. All these have been hostels for the aborigines in my lifetime and have been sold to the white man to cultivate.

== Administration ==
An administrator (Simon Wallace-Smith of Deloitte) was appointed by the government to run the trust in 2003. However, the remaining shareholders objected and in 2011 they staged a two-week blockade of the site, camping at the settlement's gate and refusing access to all government officials. Wallace-Smith was escorted back in by police.

== Notable residents ==
Albert Mullett, although born in Melbourne in 1933, lived with his family on the fringe of Lake Tyers, but when "part-Aboriginal" families were forced to leave the mission they moved to the other side of the lake.

John Gorrie PSM, born in Melbourne on 10 March 1950, lived on Lake Tyers circa 1952 to 1960. He is a descendant of Charlie Hammond, survivor of the Brodribb River massacre, and was the first Aboriginal man awarded the Public Service Medal in 2005.

== See also ==
- Lake Condah Mission
- Royal Commission on the Aborigines (1877)
