= Fitzroy River (Victoria) =

Fitzroy
- Location of the Fitzroy River mouth in Victoria
- Etymology: FitzRoy Somerset, 1st Baron Raglan.

Location
- Country: Australia
- State: Victoria
- Region: Victorian Midlands, Naracoorte Coastal Plain (IBRA), Western District
- Local government area: Glenelg Shire
- Town: Heywood, Tyrendarra

Physical characteristics
- Source: Mount Vandyke
  - location: Cobboboonee National Park
  - coordinates: 38°2′55″S 141°21′53″E
  - elevation: 140 m (460 ft)
- Mouth: Portland Bay, Great Australian Bight
  - location: southeast of Tyrendarra
  - coordinates: 38°15′49″S 141°51′18″E
  - elevation: 0 m (0 ft)
- Length: 58 km (36 mi)

Basin features
- River system: Glenelg Hopkins catchment
- Tributaries
  - left: Sunday Creek (Victoria), Darlot Creek
- National park: Cobboboonee National Park

The Fitzroy River, a perennial river of the Glenelg Hopkins catchment, is located in the Western District of Victoria, Australia.

== Course and features ==
The Fitzroy River rises below Mount Vandyke in the Cobboboonee National Park, near the western edge of the Lower Glenelg National Park. The river flows east by south, through Heywood, then between the western edge of the Tyrendarra lava flow and the Mount Clay escarpment, and thence across a coastal plain. The river is joined by two minor tributaries before reaching its mouth and emptying into Portland Bay in the Great Australian Bight southeast of Tyrendarra. The river descends 138 metres (453 ft) over its 58-kilometre (36 mi) course.

One of its tributaries, Darlot Creek, approximately 51 kilometres (32 mi) in length, flows from near Branxholme in a southerly direction through Lake Condah then along the eastern side of the Tyrendarra lava flow before joining the river close to its mouth.

The river is traversed by the Henty Highway at Heywood and the Princes Highway at Tyrendarra.

== Etymology ==
The river was named Clark's River in December 1834 by Edward Henty after the first person in his party to sight it near Tyrendarra. In August 1836 Major Mitchell, who, at the time, was unaware of the presence of the Hentys at Portland Bay named it after FitzRoy Somerset, 1st Baron Raglan when he crossed it near the site of Heywood. Darlots (later Darlot) Creek was named after Henry Darlot who rested cattle beside the creek in 1840 and 1841 prior to the establishment of pastoral leases in the area.

== See also ==
- List of rivers of Australia § Victoria
