= Bessiebelle =

Bessiebelle Victoria
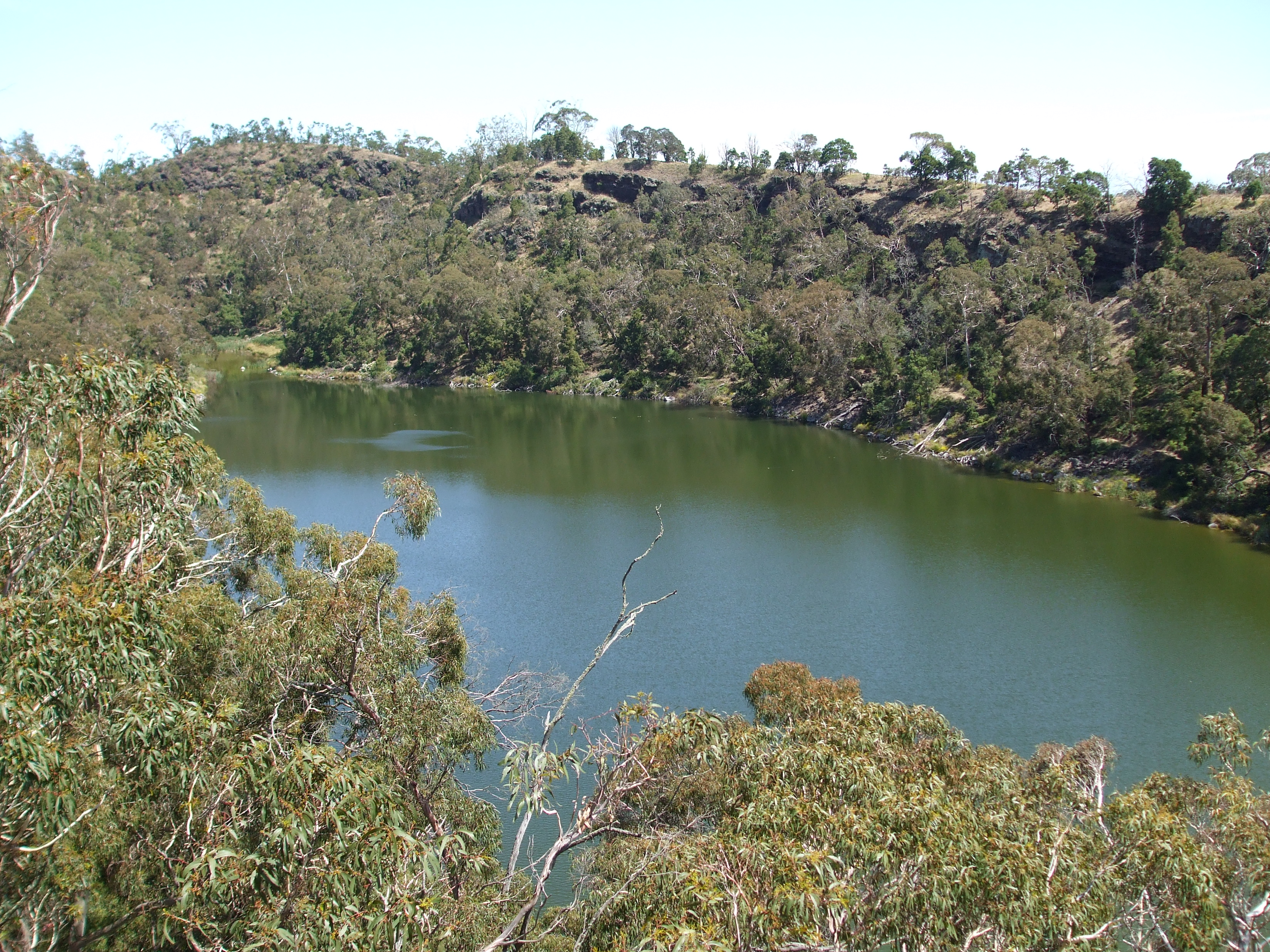
- Lake Surprise to the north of Bessiebelle

- Coordinates: 38°09′S 141°58′E
- Population: 98 (2016)
- Postcode(s): 3304
- Location: 311 km (193 mi) W of Melbourne; 70 km (43 mi) NW of Warrnambool; 49 km (30 mi) NE of Portland; 17 km (11 mi) S of Macarthur
- LGA(s): Shire of Moyne
- State electorate(s): South-West Coast
- Federal division(s): Wannon

Bessiebelle is a locality in western Victoria, Australia. The locality is in the Shire of Moyne local government area, in what is commonly known as the Western District. It sits approximately 311 kilometres (193 mi) west of the state capital, Melbourne, on the Eumeralla River adjacent to the Mount Eccles National Park.

In 1844, Thomas Alexander Browne took up the area for a pastoral property he called Squattleseamere. Approximately half of the original property was sold off to smaller settlers between 1871 and 1896. Bessiebelle Primary School opened as Broadwater State School in 1874. Bessiebelle Post Office opened in May 1884. Bessiebelle Presbyterian Church opened in January 1905, followed by a general store in 1907 and a mechanics' institute around the same time, as well as a sawmill and several stores. The school was renamed Bessiebelle in 1917. The remainder of the Squattleseamere estate was sold for closer settlement and subdivided in 1924. A pastoral and agricultural society had developed by the 1940s. The post office and Presbyterian Church both closed in 1972. The school closed in 2005 as enrolments had dropped to 10. The Bessiebelle Hall (also known as the Bessiebelle Mechanics' Hall) remains in operation.

At the 2006 census the population of Bessiebelle was 195, but at the 2011 census the population of Bessiebelle was 176. Bessiebelle recorded a population of 98 at the 2016 census.

The locality has an active CFA Branch.
