= Budj Bim =

Mountain in Victoria, Australia

- Mount Eccles
- Location within Victoria

Highest point
- Elevation: 178 m (584 ft)
- Coordinates: 38°3′46″S 141°55′32″E

Geography
- Location: Victoria, Australia

Climbing
- Easiest route: Lava Canal track

Australian National Heritage List
- Official name: Budj Bim National Heritage Landscape
- Designated: 20 July 2004

UNESCO World Heritage Site
- Official name: Budj Bim Cultural Landscape
- Type: Cultural
- Criteria: iii, v
- Designated: 6 July 2019 (43rd session)
- Reference no.: 1577
- Region: Asia-Pacific

Budj Bim, also known as Mount Eccles, is a dormant volcano near Macarthur in southwestern Victoria, Australia. It lies within the geologically defined area known as the Newer Volcanics Province, which is the youngest volcanic area in Australia and stretches from western Victoria to south-eastern South Australia.

It is situated within the Budj Bim National Park. Budj Bim is the Gunditjmara name, meaning "High Head". The roughly conical peak rises 178 metres (584 ft) above surrounding area. The peak is a scoria hill that was thrown up beside a group of three overlapping volcanic craters that now contain Lake Surprise. A line of smaller craters and scoria cones runs to the southeast. Lava flows extend to form a shield volcano and are fed by several lava channels, or "lava canals" as they are known locally. This lava flow, known as the Tyrendarra lava flow, changed the drainage pattern of the region, and created large wetlands.

Large areas to the west and south-west of the mountain have been heritage-listed. The Budj Bim heritage areas include the Tyrendarra Indigenous Protected Area (designated in December 2003), the Budj Bim National Heritage Landscape (added to the National Heritage List in July 2004), and the Budj Bim Cultural Landscape (designated a UNESCO World Heritage Site in July 2019).

== Formation ==
The volcano lies within the Newer Volcanics Province, an area defined by its geological features. This covers an area of 15,000 square kilometres (5,800 sq mi), with over 400 small shield volcanoes and volcanic vents, and contains the youngest volcanoes in Australia.

Initial estimates of the age of the eruption of Budj Bim were all "minimum ages", based on swamps that formed some time after the eruption and ranged from 6,000 to 27,000 years BP. Later evidence suggested that the eruption was at least 30,000 BP (using dated sediments in the floor of the Lake Surprise crater) and could have been as long as 40,000 years ago for the Tyrendarra lava flow. Research published in February 2020 using argon–argon dating, a method of radiometric dating, has dated the eruption at around 36,900 years ago. Specifically, Budj Bim was dated at within 3,100 years either side of 36,900 years BP, and Tower Hill was dated at within 3,800 years either side of 36,800 years BP. Significantly, owing to the presence of human artefacts found under volcanic ash at Tower Hill, this is a "minimum age constraint for human presence in Victoria", and also could be interpreted as evidence for the Gunditjmara oral histories which tell of volcanic eruptions being some of the oldest oral traditions in existence.

The eruptions produced the Tyrendarra lava flow, which flowed in a generally southerly direction into the ocean at Tyrendarra, 50 kilometres (31 mi) away. The flow disrupted the earlier drainage system; to the east the Fitzroy River now flows cleanly between the rocks of the lava flow and the Mount Clay escarpment; to the west its tributary Darlot Creek flows through a more complex landscape of swamps, wetlands and adjacent low-lying land prone to flooding.

The peak rises 178 metres (584 ft).

== Historic and cultural significance ==
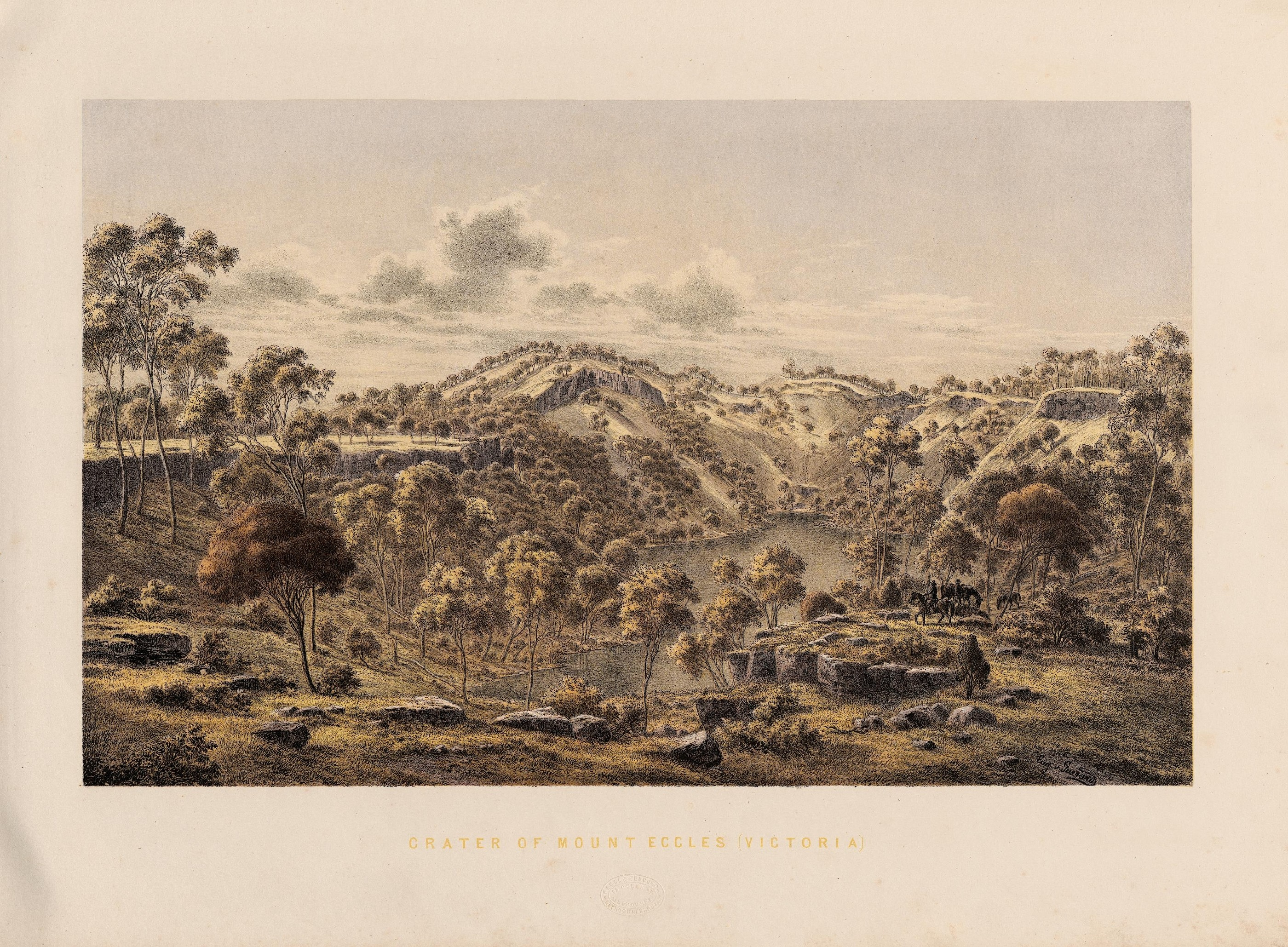
Crater of Budj Bim

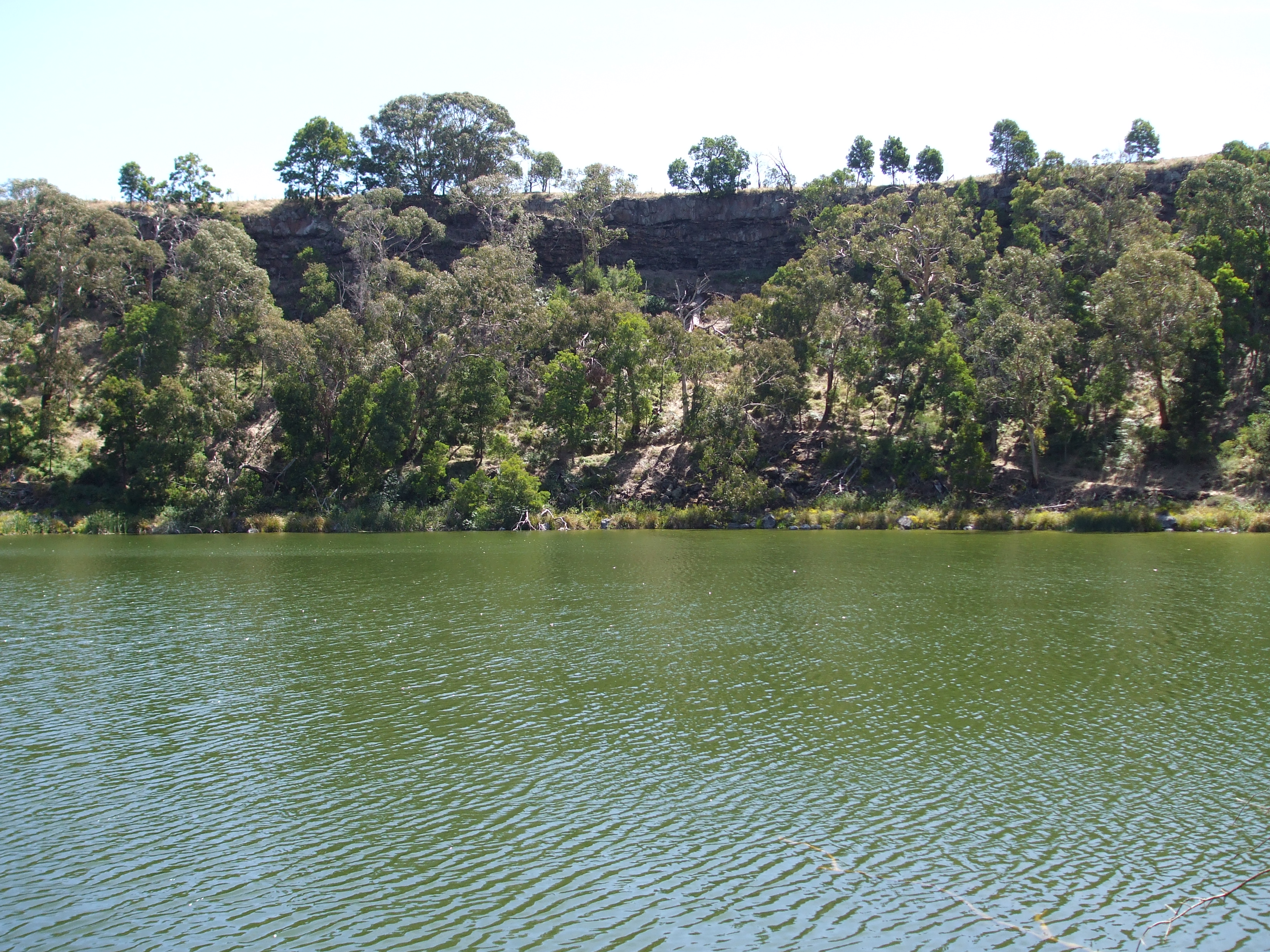
Lake Surprise, Budj Bim National Park

The volcano itself and the surrounding lava flows are of great historic and cultural significance. The creation story of the local Gunditjmara people is based on the eruption of the volcano more than 30,000 years ago. It was via this event that an ancestral creator-being known as Budj Bim was revealed.

The Tyrendarra lava flow changed the drainage pattern of the region, and created large wetlands. From some thousands of years before European settlement (one of five eel trap systems at Lake Condah has been carbon dated to 6,600 years old), the Gunditjmara people developed a system of aquaculture which channelled the water of the Darlot Creek into adjacent lowlying areas trapping short-finned eels and other fish in a series of weirs, dams and channels. The discovery of these large-scale farming techniques and manipulation of the landscape, highlighted in Bruce Pascoe's best-selling book Dark Emu in 2014, shows that the Indigenous inhabitants were not only hunter gatherers, but cultivators and farmers.

Many Gundjitmara people were moved into Lake Condah Mission, which later became a government-run Aboriginal reserve, which separated "half-caste" children from their parents, who became part of the Stolen Generations.

=== Protected areas ===
There are several overlapping protected or heritage-listed areas, two of which encompass Budj Bim itself and the others the lava flows:

- Indigenous Protected Areas:
  - The Tyrendarra IPA (38°12′S 141°46′E), an area of 248 hectares (610 acres) on Darlot Creek, was declared in December 2003. This area comprises the Peters site between the Fitzroy River and Darlot Creek purchased by the Gunditj Mirring Traditional Owners Aboriginal Corporation in 2010 and the Kurtonitj wetlands to the north acquired by the Corporation in 2009.
  - Kurtonitj IPA, dedicated in 2009.
  - Lake Condah IPA, which includes significant wetlands, was dedicated in 2010.
- The Budj Bim National Heritage Landscape, which includes both the Tyrendarra Area (Place ID 105678, about 275 hectares (680 acres), 2 kilometres (1.2 mi) north of Tyrendarra) and the Mt Eccles Lake Condah Area (Place ID 105673, about 7,880 hectares (19,500 acres), 6 kilometres (3.7 mi) south-west of Macarthur, comprising Budj Bim National Park, Stones State Faunal Reserve, Muldoons Aboriginal Land, Allambie Aboriginal Land and Lake Condah Mission) was added to the National Heritage List on 20 July 2004. (This includes the Tyrendarra and Lake Condah IPAs mentioned above, but not Kurtonitj.)
- The Budj Bim Cultural Landscape was added to the World Heritage List on 6 July 2019. There are three components of this area: the boundaries are those of Budj Bim National Park, Budj Bim Indigenous Protected Area, Tyrendarra Indigenous Protected Area and Lake Condah Mission.

=== Naming Mount Eccles ===
The mountain was named Mount Eeles in 1836 by Major Thomas Mitchell after William Eeles of the 95th Regiment of Foot who fought with Mitchell in the Peninsular War. A draftsman's error meant that the name was rendered Eccles from 1845.

== See also ==
- List of mountains in Australia § Victoria
- List of volcanoes in Australia
