= Royal Commission on the Aborigines (1877) =

Royal commission in the colony of Victoria

The Royal Commission on the Aborigines was a royal commission held in the colony of Victoria (now a state of Australia) in 1877 to inform the government of the day on how best to deal with and look after the welfare of Aboriginal Australians in the colony.

== Background ==
It was appointed in January 1877 "to inquire into the present condition of the Aborigines of this colony, and to advise them as to the best means of caring for, and dealing with them, in the future". The commission was headed by William Foster Stawell and looked at the six Aboriginal reserves (known as missions) in Victoria (Coranderrk, Lake Condah, Lake Tyers, Framlingham, Ramahyuck, and Ebenezer). Among the witnesses giving evidence at the commission were four Aboriginal people, representatives of the Aboriginal Protection Board (including secretary Christian Ogilvie), and various clergy, managers, and teachers involved in running the missions.

The commission's report was presented to both Houses of Parliament in late 1877 and published in the Parliamentary Papers. Among its conclusions, it said that colony was obliged to "mitigate as best it may the injurious effects which the occupation of the country has produced on the aboriginal inhabitants" (South Australian Register, 6 December 1877). The Register agreed, but criticised some of the reports other findings.

Some of the practical recommendations were to fence the reserves, and stock them suitably with livestock. Some of the reserves should be enlarged, and several new activities were suggested, such as growing olives, hops, and garden flowers; beekeeping; carpentry; and others. It was also recommended that Aboriginal workers should receive fair remuneration, with payment made for the amount of work rather than by time. Overall, it reported that the reserves should be maintained, with a view to making them self-supporting. The report also said "There are those who think it premature to assert that the race must necessarily disappear altogether and that, though at present they have not the moral force to hold their own in the struggle of life, they may, in future generations, acquire the resolution and provident habits which would enable them to do so... in any case, there will survive the memory that the Government of the day did not neglect a sacred duty to those who, by no act of their own, became subject to its control".

The South Australian Register commented that "the remuneration offered in Victoria to managers [of the reserves] is insufficient to induce any man of ability, unless one who undertakes the work in a thorough spirit of self-denial and philanthropy, to accept the office. Hence for the most part these positions are filled by missionaries. On some grounds this is perhaps to be regretted, as the possible existence of any element of sectarian propagandism in institutions supported or subsidized by the Government is a thing to be avoided. On the other hand, we cheerfully confess that stations, whether here or in Victoria, are much more likely to prosper under those who take charge of them chiefly out of a sense of religious duty than they would be if managed by those who would make the work a mere matter of gain".
