= Darlot Creek =

Coordinates: 38°14′54″S 141°47′06″E

Darlot Creek, also known as Darlots Creek or Darlot's Creek, arises in Lake Condah in south-western Victoria, flows through the wetlands in the Budj Bim heritage areas, past the site of the Lake Condah Mission, and joins the Fitzroy River at the south-eastern corner of the Tyrendarra Nature Conservation Reserve. It lies within the Shire of Glenelg, and is heritage-listed.

Its Gunditjmara/Dhauwurd Wurrung name is Kallara, although spelt as Killara in some sources (and translated as "always there").
