= Noel Learmonth =

Noel Fulford Learmonth (pronounced LAIR'muth) (1880–1970) was an Australian writer, sheep farmer, naturalist, amateur historian and amateur ornithologist. For most of his life he lived in Portland, Victoria or nearby at Tyrendarra.

With others, Learmonth founded the Portland Field Naturalists Club in 1945, and was later made an honorary Life Member. He joined the Royal Australasian Ornithologists Union (RAOU) in 1948, and served as a Vice President of the organisation in 1961–1962. He had a lifelong interest in the Portland district. Books he authored are:

- Learmonth, Noel F. (1934). The Portland Bay Settlement. Being the History of Portland, Victoria, from 1800 to 1851. Historical Committee of Portland: Portland.
- Learmonth, Noel F. (1960). The Story of a Port. Portland Harbor Trust: Melbourne.
- Learmonth, Noel F. (1967). The Birds of Portland. Portland Field Naturalists Club: Portland.
- Learmonth, Noel F. (1970). Four Towns and a Survey. Hawthorn Press: Melbourne. (being on Heywood, Macarthur, Nelson, Tyrendarra, and Mildura railway line)

The Royal Historical Society of Victoria recognised his contribution to the history of the State by making him a Fellow in 1962.
