= Lake Condah =

Lake Condah (Tae Rak)
- Tae Rak (Gunditjmara)
- Location within Victoria Location within Australia
- Location: Newer Volcanics Province, Victoria, Australia
- Coordinates: 38°03′46.1″S 141°49′57.9″E
- Type: lake

Lake Condah, also known by its Gunditjmara name Tae Rak, is in the Australian state of Victoria, about 324 kilometres (201 mi) west of Melbourne and 20 kilometres (12 mi) north-east of Heywood by road. It is in the form of a shallow basin, about 4 kilometres (2.5 mi) in length and 1 kilometre (0.62 mi) wide.

The lake is located in the Newer Volcanics Province, a geologically defined area of western Victoria with the youngest volcanoes in Australia, not far west of the Budj Bim (Mt Eccles) volcano. It lies just outside the boundary of Budj Bim National Park, but within the Budj Bim heritage areas, including the Budj Bim Cultural Landscape, added to the World Heritage List in 2019. The area is known for the extensive aquaculture systems created by the local Gunditjmara people.

== Location and description ==
The closest town is Heywood, some 300 kilometres (190 mi) west of Melbourne.

The lake is shallow, and about 4km long and 1km wide. It lies within the Budj Bim heritage areas, an area known for the ancient aquaculture systems created by the Gunditjmara at least 6,600 years ago to trap short-finned eels (kooyang) and other fish.

== History ==
The lake was probably created by lava flows during or after an eruption of Budj Bim. It is not a crater lake, but a shallow basin on the lava plain. The volcano last erupted about 36,900 years BP.

The Kerrup-Jmara ("people of the lake") are a clan of Gunditjmara Aboriginal people, who lived around the shores of the lake, which they called Tae Rak, for thousands of years pre-dating the arrival of Europeans, and had specific responsibility for it.

Lake Condah was first happened upon by European settlers in 1841, when David Edgar and William Thompson Edgar were travelling through the area. Edgar gave it the name Lake Condon. Anglican pastoralist Cecil Pybus Cooke, who in 1849 acquired Lake Condah station, changed the name of Lake Condon to Lake Condah in the mistaken belief that it meant "black swan", which lived on the lake.

The Gunditjmara people were driven off their lands by the new settlers, and some were relocated to Lake Condah Mission, although not without resistance, in the Eumeralla Wars.

Damaging floods in 1946 led to the construction of a large drain along the swampland, which was connected to the spring at the Mission that flowed into Darlots Creek, completed in 1954. Various plans to restore water to the lake were proposed in the late 20th century, until after March 2008, when Lake Condah was returned to Gunditjmara people. The Lake Condah Restoration Conservation Management Plan was completed in a way that ensured that cultural heritage values were maintained, and works were completed in 2010, winning the Civil Contractors Federation Earth Award.
