= Budj Bim National Park =

National park in Victoria, Australia

- IUCN category II (national park)
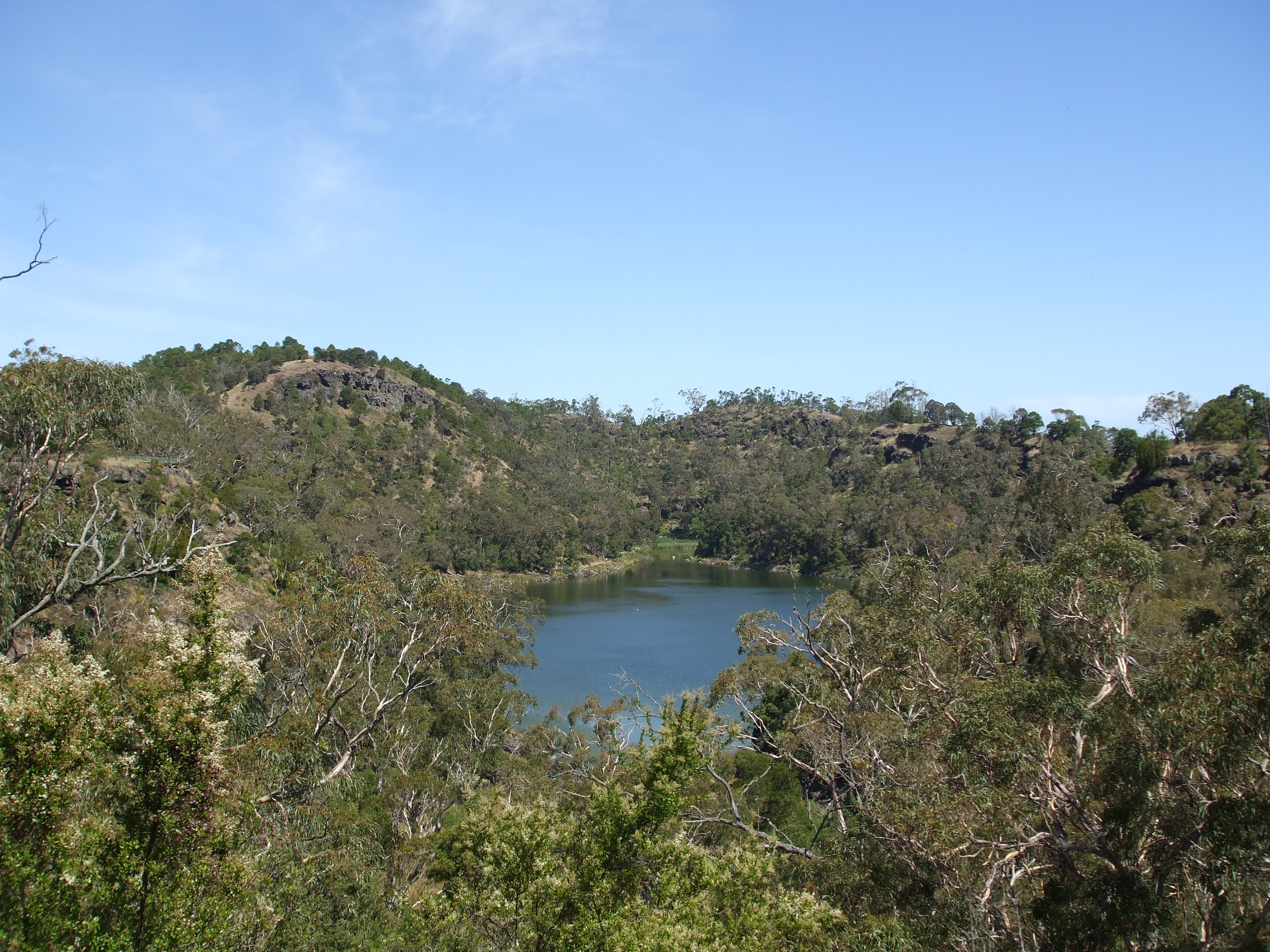
- Lake Surprise, a volcanic crater lake, within the national park

- Location within Victoria
- Location: Victoria
- Nearest city: Macarthur
- Coordinates: 38°05′S 141°53′E
- Area: 54.70 km^{2} (21.12 sq mi)
- Established: 7 June 1960
- Governing body: Parks Victoria; GMTOAC
- Website: https://www.parks.vic.gov.au/places-to-see/parks/budj-bim-national-park

The Budj Bim National Park, formerly known as Mount Eccles National Park, is a national park located in the Western District of Victoria, Australia. The 5,470-hectare (13,500-acre) national park is situated approximately 270 kilometres (170 mi) west of Melbourne and approximately 15 kilometres (9.3 mi) southwest of Macarthur. It derives its name from the Budj Bim volcano, formerly Mount Eccles, which is situated in the north-east of the park.

The park now forms part of the larger Budj Bim heritage areas of both national and world significance, due to the extensive systems of aquaculture created by Aboriginal Australians thousands of years ago and the significance of the area to the Gunditjmara people.

== Features ==
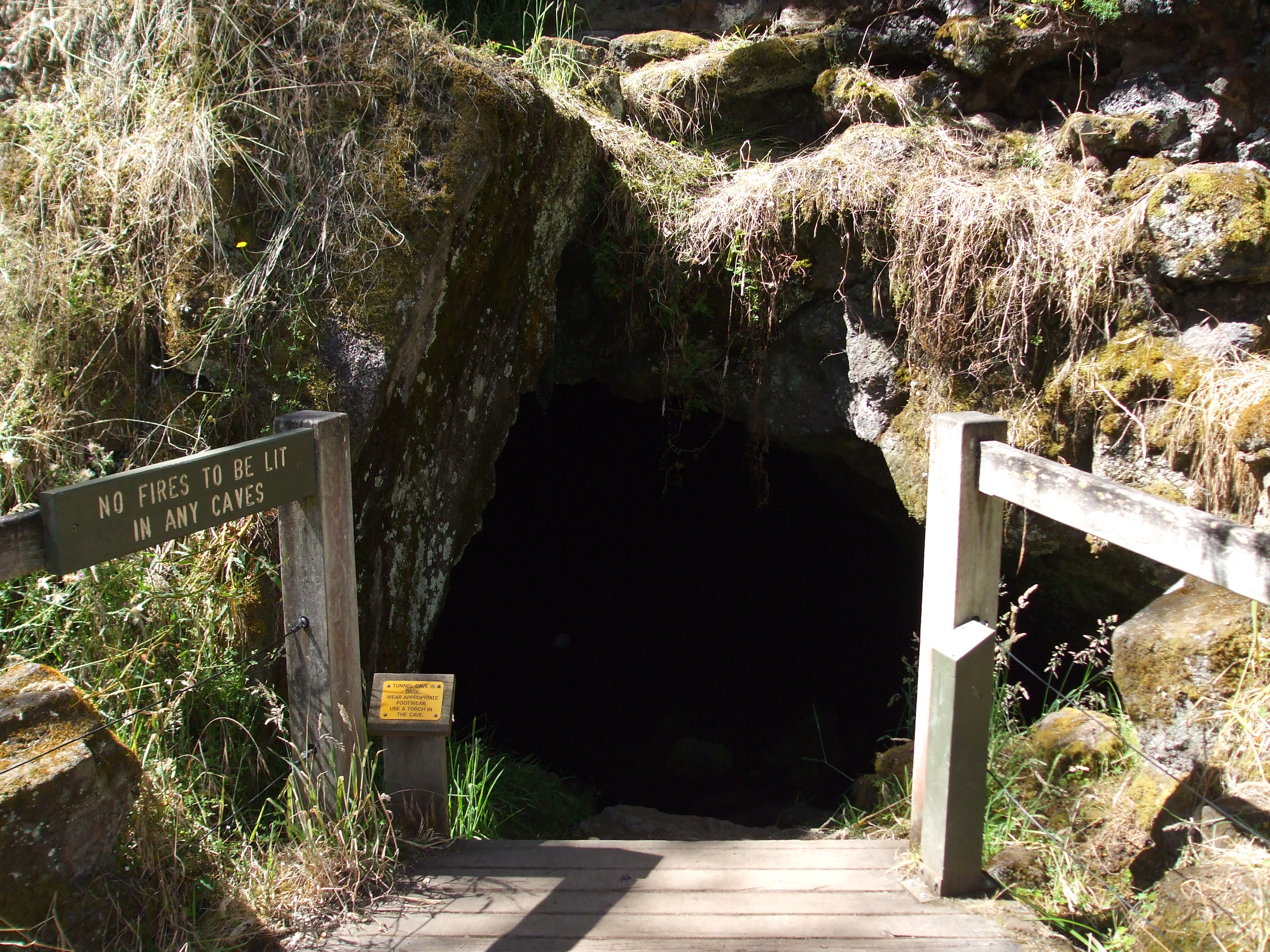
Lava tube entrance

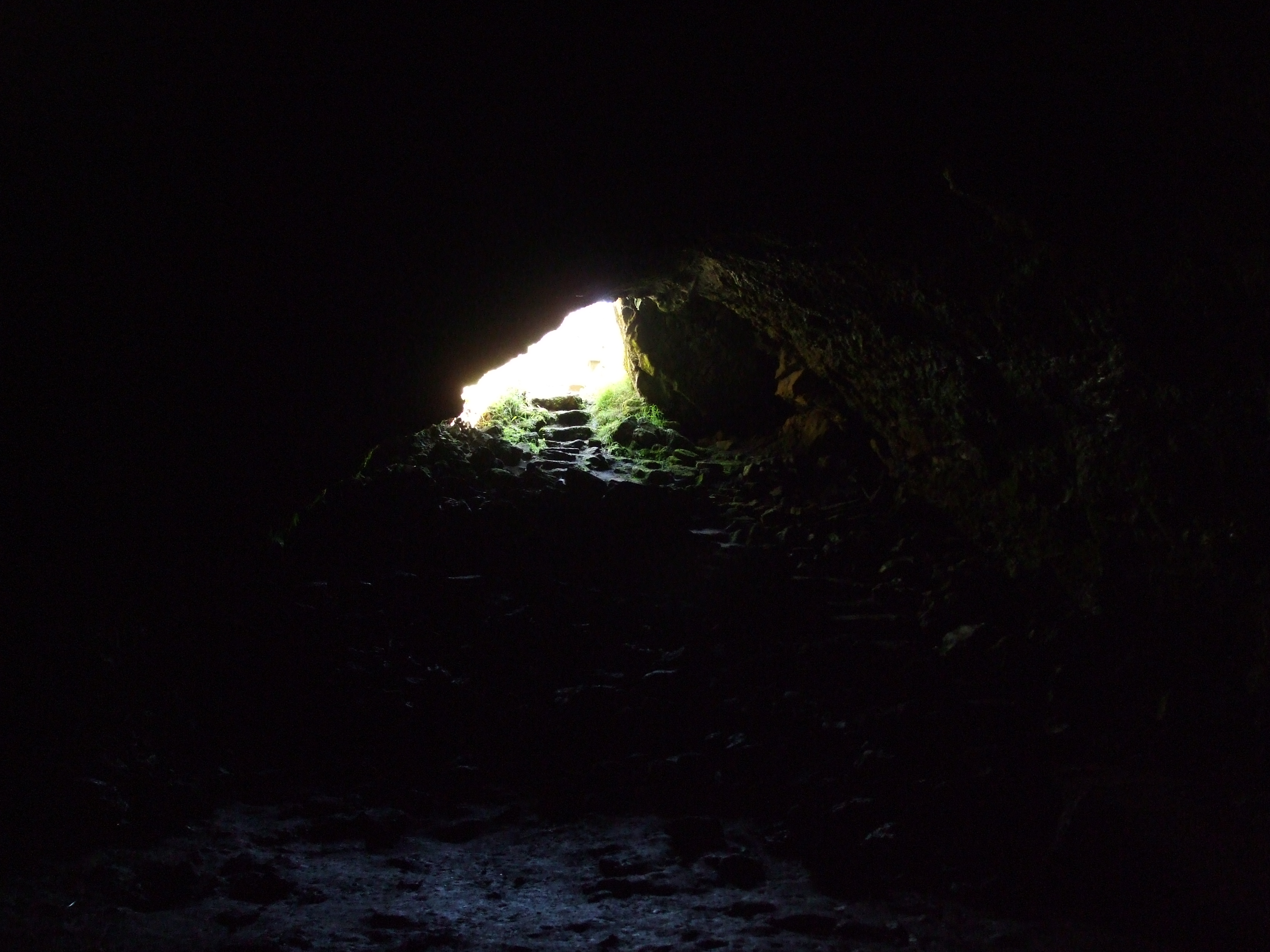
Inside lava tube

Located within the national park is Budj Bim, formerly named Mount Eccles by the European people who settled in the area, is the site of one of the most recent active volcanos in Australia. The first activity was about 40,000 years ago when Budj Bim was formed by lava pouring out the Earth's crust. The most recent eruption was approximately 8,000 years ago. Budj Bim is a fairly small hill surrounded by lush vegetation with a small, hidden, deep volcanic crater lake named Lake Surprise. It is famous for an adjacent lava tube and there are numerous lava tubes in the surrounding farm land.

== Heritage areas ==
The park was added to the Australian National Heritage List in 2004 as part of the Budj Bim National Heritage Landscape for its importance in Indigenous history and its geology.

As one of three components of the Budj Bim Cultural Landscape, it was added to the UNESCO World Heritage List on 6 July 2019.

== Management ==
As of 2020 Budj Bim National Park, as part of the Budj Bim National Heritage Landscape, is jointly managed by Parks Victoria, the (Gunditjmara) Gunditj Mirring Traditional Owners Aboriginal Corporation (GMTOAC) and Winda-Mara TOAC (a south-west Victorian organisation representing Indigenous Australians in the area). The Council forms part of the 2007 Native Title Settlement Agreement between the Gunditjmara and the Victoria State Government, under which both parties manage the park landscape.

== 2020 bushfires ==
During the 2019-2020 Australian bushfire season, fires broke out within the Budj Bim Cultural Heritage Landscape. The stone fish traps and the stone house site were unaffected by fire, and fortunately the fires were quickly contained, partly due to mild weather conditions and partly by the efforts of firefighters. Lake Condah and Condah Mission were not directly affected by the fires. In the National Park, the campground and picnic area reopened from 29 February 2020, but the Lake Surprise walking track and access to Tunnel Cave were closed due to the impact of the fires. As of 19 March 2020, the Crater Rim Walk and Lava Canal Walk are open, but re-routed near Tunnel Cave.

== 2025 bushfires ==
On Sunday, March 9, 2025, a lightning strike ignited a bushfire in the park. As the fire spread, campers and other visitors were asked to leave. The fire was contained a week later. A few weeks after the fire damaged a significant portion of the park, state government officials decided to euthanise many koalas, believed to be suffering from poor health after the fires, and with a low chance of survival, given that their food source had been decimated. The state hired marksmen to shoot koalas from helicopters; some 700 koalas were eliminated. Once discovered, the aerial culling draw great criticism from wildlife advocates and media attention internationally. Opponents called for an end to the killing, access to the closed area, and an investigation into the government's opaque decision-making process.

== See also ==
- Protected areas of Victoria
- List of national parks of Australia
