= Protected areas of Victoria =

Protected areas of the state of Victoria, Australia

Victoria is the smallest mainland state in Australia. As of 2022 it contained 5,081 separate protected areas with a total land area of 4,012,888 ha (9,916,060 acres) (17.64% of the state's area).

The parks are managed by Parks Victoria, a state government agency. There are also many smaller state areas which are subject to commercial activity such as logging.

National parks of Victoria State parks of Victoria Marine national parks of Victoria Marine and coastal parks of Victoria Marine sanctuaries of Victoria Other parks of Victoria

== Main parks ==
=== National parks ===
National parks provide the highest level of protection to diverse natural areas. They usually contain the best and most unique examples of our natural values and biodiversity. There are 45 national parks in Victoria, totalling 2,910,738 ha (7,192,590 acres) (72.53% of the state's protected areas).

National parks of Victoria

National parks of Victoria
| Order | National park name | Image | Area | | Declared as a national park | Notes |
| Order | National park name | Image | ha | acre | Declared as a national park | Notes |
|---|---|---|---|---|---|---|
| 1 | Alfred | | 3,022 | 7,470 | 23 December 1925 | |
| 2 | Alpine | | 662,354 | 1,636,710 | 2 December 1989 | Includes the former Tingaringy NP, Wabonga Plateau SP, Bogong NP, Wonnangatta–Moroka NP, Cobberas–Tingaringy NP |
| 3 | Barmah | | 28,490 | 70,400 | 27 June 2010 | Proclaimed in 1987 (as Barmah State Park) |
| 4 | Baw Baw | | 12,784 | 31,590 | 26 April 1979 | |
| 5 | Brisbane Ranges | | 8,881 | 21,950 | 1 December 1975 | |
| 6 | Budj Bim | | 8,571 | 21,180 | 7 June 1960 | Formerly known as Mount Eccles National Park. UNESCO World Heritage listing from 2019 |
| 7 | Burrowa – Pine Mountain | | 18,965 | 46,860 | 16 May 1978 | |
| 8 | Chiltern-Mt Pilot | | 21,665 | 53,540 | 30 October 2002 | Proclaimed in 1980 (as Chiltern State Park); and in 1997 (as Chiltern Box–Ironbark National Park) |
| 9 | Churchill | | 272 | 670 | 12 February 1941 | Formerly known as Dandenong National Park (1941-1944) |
| 10 | Cobboboonee | | 18,553 | 45,850 | 11 November 2008 | |
| 11 | Coopracambra | | 38,513 | 95,170 | 1988 | Proclaimed in 1979 (as Coopracambra State Park) |
| 12 | Croajingolong | | 88,516 | 218,730 | 26 April 1979 | Includes the former Wingan Inlet NP, Mallacoota Inlet NP, Captain James Cook NP |
| 13 | Dandenong Ranges | | 3,534 | 8,730 | 13 December 1987 | Proclaimed in 1928 (as Ferntree Gully National Park) |
| 14 | Errinundra | | 43,144 | 106,610 | 21 June 1988 | |
| 15 | French Island | | 10,318 | 25,500 | 21 June 1988 | Proclaimed in 1984 (as French Island State Park) |
| 16 | Grampians | | 168,277 | 415,820 | 18 December 1984 | |
| 17 | Great Otway | | 110,412 | 272,830 | 11 December 2005 | Includes the former Melba Gully SP, Otway NP, Angahook–Lorne SP, Carlisle SP |
| 18 | Greater Bendigo | | 17,575 | 43,430 | 30 October 2002 | Includes the former Whipstick SP, Kamarooka SP |
| 19 | Gunbower | | 9,317 | 23,020 | 27 June 2010 | |
| 20 | Hattah – Kulkyne | | 49,983 | 123,510 | 26 April 1980 | Proclaimed in 1960 (as Hattah Lakes National Park) |
| 21 | Heathcote-Graytown | | 12,693 | 31,370 | 30 October 2002 | |
| 22 | Kara Kara | | 13,982 | 34,550 | 30 October 2002 | Proclaimed in 1984 (as Kara Kara State Park); Formerly known as St Arnaud Range National Park (2002-2012) |
| 23 | Kinglake | | 23,126 | 57,150 | 7 March 1928 | |
| 24 | Lake Eildon | | 27,822 | 68,750 | 4 June 1997 | Includes the former Fraser NP, Eildon SP |
| 25 | The Lakes | | 2,407 | 5,950 | 30 October 1956 | |
| 26 | Lind | | 1,370 | 3,400 | 1926 | |
| 27 | Little Desert | | 131,607 | 325,210 | 10 December 1968 | |
| 28 | Lower Glenelg | | 26,451 | 65,360 | 16 December 1969 | |
| 29 | Lower Goulburn | | 9,321 | 23,030 | 27 June 2010 | |
| 30 | Mitchell River | | 14,402 | 35,590 | 17 June 1986 | Proclaimed in 1963 (as Glenaladale National Park) |
| 31 | Mornington Peninsula | | 2,682 | 6,630 | 1988 | Includes the former Cape Schanck Coastal Park, and part of Nepean SP; Formerly known as Point Nepean National Park (1988-1995) |
| 32 | Morwell | | 565 | 1,400 | 29 November 1966 | |
| 33 | Mount Buffalo | | 27,484 | 67,910 | 1898 | |
| 34 | Mount Richmond | | 1,738 | 4,290 | 7 June 1960 | |
| 35 | Murray – Sunset | | 665,694 | 1,644,970 | 5 June 1991 | Proclaimed in 1979 (as Pink Lakes State Park) |
| 36 | Organ Pipes | | 153 | 380 | 14 December 1971 | |
| 37 | Point Nepean | | 540 | 1,300 | 17 August 2005 | |
| 38 | Port Campbell | | 2,429 | 6,000 | 9 December 1964 | |
| 39 | Snowy River | | 114,729 | 283,500 | 26 April 1979 | |
| 40 | Tarra-Bulga | | 2,028 | 5,010 | 17 June 1986 | Includes the former Tarra Valley NP, Bulga NP |
| 41 | Terrick Terrick | | 6,388 | 15,790 | 15 April 1999 | Proclaimed in 1988 (as Terrick Terrick State Park) |
| 42 | Warby-Ovens | | 14,708 | 36,340 | 27 June 2010 | Proclaimed in 1975 (as Warby Range State Park) |
| 43 | Wilsons Promontory | | 48,202 | 119,110 | 8 July 1898 | |
| 44 | Wyperfeld | | 359,855 | 889,220 | 20 October 1909 | |
| 45 | Yarra Ranges | | 77,229 | 190,840 | 15 December 1995 | |

=== State parks ===
State parks help protect the state's natural values. They are very similar to national parks, however, the conservation values and landscapes they protect are smaller or less diverse. There are 26 state parks in Victoria, totalling 158,043 ha (390,530 acres) (3.94% of the state's protected areas).

State parks of Victoria

State parks of Victoria
| Order | State park name | Area | | Declared as a state park | Notes |
| Order | State park name | ha | acre | Declared as a state park | Notes |
|---|---|---|---|---|---|
| 1 | Arthurs Seat | 566 | 1,400 | 16 May 1978 | Includes part of the former Nepean State Park |
| 2 | Black Range | 11,731 | 28,990 | 21 June 1988 | |
| 3 | Broken-Boosey | 1,010 | 2,500 | 30 October 2002 | |
| 4 | Bunyip | 16,647 | 41,140 | 23 September 1992 | |
| 5 | Cape Nelson | 229 | 570 | 26 April 1979 | |
| 6 | Cathedral Range | 3,599 | 8,890 | 26 April 1979 | |
| 7 | Dergholm | 10,886 | 26,900 | 23 September 1992 | |
| 8 | Enfield | 4,323 | 10,680 | 3 August 1995 | |
| 9 | Holey Plains | 10,746 | 26,550 | 16 May 1978 | |
| 10 | Kooyoora | 11,455 | 28,310 | 18 December 1984 | |
| 11 | Lake Tyers | 8,684 | 21,460 | 19 June 1984 | |
| 12 | Langi Ghiran | 3,043 | 7,520 | 8 December 1984 | |
| 13 | Leaghur | 2,045 | 5,050 | 23 September 1992 | |
| 14 | Lerderderg | 20,545 | 50,770 | 21 June 1988 | |
| 15 | Moondarra | 6,362 | 15,720 | 18 December 1984 | |
| 16 | Mount Arapiles-Tooan | 7,457 | 18,430 | 17 December 1987 | |
| 17 | Mount Buangor | 2,499 | 6,180 | 27 October 1989 | |
| 18 | Mount Granya | 6,164 | 15,230 | 3 August 1995 | |
| 19 | Mount Lawson | 13,366 | 33,030 | 21 June 1988 | |
| 20 | Mount Napier | 2,939 | 7,260 | 24 June 1987 | |
| 21 | Mount Samaria | 7,445 | 18,400 | 26 April 1979 | |
| 22 | Mount Worth | 1,032 | 2,550 | 16 May 1978 | |
| 23 | Paddys Ranges | 2,015 | 4,980 | 27 October 1989 | |
| 24 | Reef Hills | 2,005 | 4,950 | 2 May 1986 | |
| 25 | Warrandyte | 687 | 1,700 | 1 December 1975 | |
| 26 | Werribee Gorge | 563 | 1,390 | 16 May 1978 | |

=== Regional parks ===
Regional parks are found close to urban centres or major tourist routes. While still places of natural beauty, visitor recreation is the primary purpose of regional parks.

- Ararat Regional Park
- Baranduda Regional Park
- Bendigo Regional Park
- Cobram Regional Park
- Colquhoun Regional Park
- Crawford River Regional Park
- Creswick Regional Park
- Crossover Regional Park
- Echuca Regional Park
- Glenmaggie Regional Park
- Hepburn Regional Park
- Jarvis Creek Plateau Regional Park
- Kerang Regional Park
- Kororoit Creek Regional Park (being developed)
- Kurth Kiln Regional Park
- Macedon Regional Park
- Maryborough Regional Park
- Mirboo North Regional Park
- Mount Alexander Regional Park
- Mount Mitta Mitta Regional Park
- Mount Raymond Regional Park
- Shepparton Regional Park
- St Arnaud Regional Park
- Tocumwal Regional Park
- Wandong Regional Park
- Werribee Regional Park
- Woowookarung Regional Park
- Yarrawonga Regional Park
- You Yangs Regional Park

=== Metropolitan parks ===
Metropolitan parks are very similar to regional parks, however, are located in metropolitan Melbourne.

- Albert Park
- Braeside Park
- Cardinia Creek Parklands
- Cardinia Reservoir Parks
  - Aura Vale Lake Park
- Dandenong Valley Parklands
  - Bushy Park Wetlands
  - Jells Park
  - Koomba Park
  - Nortons Park
  - Shepherds Bush
  - Tirhatuan Park
- Herring Island Environmental Sculpture Park
- Greenvale Reservoir Park
- Karkarook Park
- Lysterfield Park
- Maribyrnong Valley Parklands
  - Brimbank Park
  - Horseshoe Bend Farm
- Maroondah Reservoir Park
- Merri Creek Park
- Mullum Mullum Park
- Plenty Gorge Parklands
- Silvan Reservoir Park
- Sugarloaf Reservoir Parks
- Toorourrong Reservoir Park
- Wattle Park
- Werribee Park
- Westgate Park
- Yan Yean Reservoir Park
- Yarra Bend Park
- Yarra Valley Parklands
  - Banksia Park
  - Birrarrung Park
  - Candlebark Park
  - Longridge Park Camp
  - Sweeneys Flats
  - Westerfolds Park
  - Yarra Flats Park

== Indigenous Protected Areas ==
Indigenous Protected Areas (IPAs) are "areas of land and sea managed by Indigenous groups as protected areas for biodiversity conservation through voluntary agreements with the Australian Government".

There are 5 indigenous protected areas in Victoria, totalling 3,888 ha (9,610 acres) (0.1% of the state's protected areas). The following IPAs have been declared in Victoria:

- Budj Bim
  - Kurtonitj
  - Lake Condah
  - Tyrendarra
- Deen Maar
- Framlingham Forest

== Historic and heritage ==
Parks Victoria is responsible for the largest and most diverse collection of heritage places on public land in Victoria. It manages more than 3,000 historic assets including cultural landscapes, buildings, infrastructure, significant trees, objects and artefacts, archaeological sites, and shipwrecks.

=== Historic and heritage parks ===
Historic or heritage parks are significant historic cultural landscapes of heritage value. There are 6 historic and heritage parks in Victoria

- Beechworth Historic Park
- Castlemaine Diggings National Heritage Park
- Point Gellibrand Heritage Park
- Steiglitz Historic Park
- Wimmera River Heritage Area Park
- Woodlands Historic Park

=== Historic and heritage areas ===
There are 75 historic and heritage areas in Victoria including:

- Coolart Historic Area
- Daylesford Court House Complex Historic Area
- Eldorado Historic Area
- Howqua Hills Historic Area
- Lal Lal – Bungal Historic Area
- Maldon Historic Area
- Moliagul Historic Area
- Oriental Claims Historic Area
- State Coal Mine Heritage Area
- Walhalla Historic Area
- White Hills Chinese Diggings Historic Area

=== Heritage River ===
There are 18 heritage rivers in Victoria, totalling 158,783 ha (392,360 acres) (3.96% of the state's protected areas). These are defined under the Heritage Rivers Act 1992 as parts of rivers and river catchment areas that have significant nature conservation, recreation, scenic or cultural heritage values

- Aberfeldy River
- Aire River
- Bemm, Goolengook, Arte and Errinundra Rivers
- Big River
- Genoa River
- Glenelg River
- Goulburn River
- Howqua River
- Lerderderg River
- Mitchell and Wonnangatta Rivers
- Mitta Mitta River
- Ovens River
- Snowy River
- Suggan Buggan and Berrima Rivers
- Thomson River
- Upper Buchan River
- Wimmera River
- Yarra River

== Marine protected areas ==
Victoria is the first jurisdiction in the world to create an entire system of highly protected marine national parks at the same time. As of 2020 Victoria contained 30 separate marine protected areas with a total area of 121,242 ha (299,600 acres) (11.87% of the state's coastal waters). Marine national parks and sanctuaries contain important marine habitats and species, or encompass areas of significant natural features; and are highly protected areas in which no fishing, extractive or damaging activities are permitted.

=== Marine national parks ===
There are 13 marine national parks in Victoria, totalling 52,191 ha (128,970 acres) (43.05% of the state's protected waters).

Marine national parks of Victoria

Marine national parks of Victoria
| Order | Marine national park name | Area | | Declared as a marine national park |
| Order | Marine national park name | ha | acre | Declared as a marine national park |
|---|---|---|---|---|
| 1 | Bunurong | 2,048 | 5,060 | 16 November 2002 |
| 2 | Cape Howe | 4,078 | 10,080 | 16 November 2002 |
| 3 | Churchill Island | 670 | 1,700 | 16 November 2002 |
| 4 | Corner Inlet | 1,414 | 3,490 | 16 November 2002 |
| 5 | Discovery Bay | 2,790 | 6,900 | 16 November 2002 |
| 6 | French Island | 2,980 | 7,400 | 16 November 2002 |
| 7 | Ninety Mile Beach | 2,652 | 6,550 | 16 November 2002 |
| 8 | Point Addis | 4,419 | 10,920 | 16 November 2002 |
| 9 | Point Hicks | 3,803 | 9,400 | 16 November 2002 |
| 10 | Port Phillip Heads | 3,473 | 8,580 | 16 November 2002 |
| 11 | Twelve Apostles | 7,502 | 18,540 | 16 November 2002 |
| 12 | Wilsons Promontory | 15,586 | 38,510 | 16 November 2002 |
| 13 | Yaringa | 776 | 1,920 | 16 November 2002 |

=== Marine sanctuaries ===
There are 11 marine sanctuaries in Victoria, totalling 864 ha (2,130 acres) (0.71% of the state's protected waters).

Marine sanctuaries of Victoria

Marine sanctuaries of Victoria
| Order | Marine sanctuaries name | Area | | Declared as a marine sanctuaries |
| Order | Marine sanctuaries name | ha | acre | Declared as a marine sanctuaries |
|---|---|---|---|---|
| 1 | Barwon Bluff | 16 | 40 | 16 November 2002 |
| 2 | Beware Reef | 220 | 540 | 16 November 2002 |
| 3 | Eagle Rock | 18 | 44 | 16 November 2002 |
| 4 | Jawbone | 30 | 74 | 16 November 2002 |
| 5 | Marengo Reefs | 13 | 32 | 16 November 2002 |
| 6 | Merri | 29 | 72 | 16 November 2002 |
| 7 | Mushroom Reef | 57 | 140 | 16 November 2002 |
| 8 | Point Cooke | 292 | 720 | 16 November 2002 |
| 9 | Point Danger | 22 | 54 | 16 November 2002 |
| 10 | Ricketts Point | 121 | 300 | 16 November 2002 |
| 11 | The Arches | 48 | 120 | 16 November 2002 |

=== Coastal and marine parks ===
Coastal Parks and Marine Parks protect areas of coastal, intertidal or subtidal land. There are 6 marine (or marine & coastal) parks in Victoria, totalling 68,187 ha (168,490 acres) (56.24% of the state's protected waters). There are also 5 coastal parks in Victoria, totalling 45,284 ha (111,900 acres) (1.13% of the state's protected land areas).

Marine and coastal parks of Victoria

Marine parks of Victoria
| Order | Marine park name | Area | | Declared as a marine park | Notes |
| Order | Marine park name | ha | acre | Declared as a marine park | Notes |
|---|---|---|---|---|---|
| 1 | Bay of Islands | 935 | 2,310 | 4 June 1997 | Coastal park |
| 2 | Bunurong | 1,260 | 3,100 | 17 December 1991 | Marine & coastal park |
| 3 | Cape Conran | 11,576 | 28,600 | 4 June 1997 | Coastal park |
| 4 | Cape Liptrap | 4,327 | 10,690 | 4 June 1997 | Coastal park |
| 5 | Corner Inlet | 28,567 | 70,590 | 18 April 1986 | Marine & coastal park |
| 6 | Discovery Bay | 10,643 | 26,300 | 26 April 1979 | Coastal park |
| 7 | Gippsland Lakes | 17,803 | 43,990 | 26 April 1979 | Coastal park |
| 8 | Nooramunga | 30,200 | 75,000 | 18 April 1986 | Marine & coastal park |
| 9 | Shallow Inlet | 1,972 | 4,870 | 18 April 1986 | Marine & coastal park |
| 10 | Wilsons Promontory | 6,187 | 15,290 | 18 April 1986 | Marine park & marine reserve |

- The former Point Cook Coastal Park (proclaimed in 1978) became part of the Point Cooke Marine Sanctuary.
- The former Cape Schanck Coastal Park (proclaimed on 1 December 1975) became part of the old Point Nepean National Park in 1988.

== Reference areas ==
Reference areas are tracts of public land containing viable samples of one or more land types that are relatively undisturbed. There are 144 reference areas in Victoria, totalling 112,628 ha (278,310 acres) (2.81% of the state's protected areas) and all but 23,032 ha (56,910 acres) are located inside other protected areas including:

- Anser Island
- Baw Baw
- Benedore River
- Cobboboonee
- Cobboboonee
- Disappointment
- French Island (East)
- French Island (North)
- Kooyoora
- Little Desert (East)
- Little Desert (West)
- Merragunegin
- Mitta Mitta
- Mount Buffalo
- Pine Mountain
- Raak Plain
- Reef Hills
- Stringybark Creek
- Sunset
- Tambo River
- Terrick Terrick
- Tooan
- Warby Range
- Wonnangatta River
- Yan Yean North
- Yan Yean South

== Other nature areas ==
=== Wilderness and Nature parks ===
Wilderness parks are large areas with native plant and animal communities that are relatively unaffected by humans. They are managed for conservation, with no facilities provided for visitors and no vehicles are permitted. There are 3 wilderness parks in Victoria, totalling 200,699 ha (495,940 acres) (5% of the state's protected areas).

There is 1 nature park in Victoria, totalling 1,925 ha (4,760 acres) (0.05% of the state's protected areas).

Other parks of Victoria

Wilderness & Nature parks of Victoria
| Order | Park name | Area | | Declared as a wilderness park | Notes |
| Order | Park name | ha | acre | Declared as a wilderness park | Notes |
|---|---|---|---|---|---|
| 1 | Avon | 39,566 | 97,770 | 27 November 1987 | Wilderness park |
| 2 | Big Desert | 141,713 | 350,180 | 26 April 1979 | Wilderness park |
| 3 | Phillip Island | 1,925 | 4,760 | 27 June 1997 | Nature park |
| 4 | Wabba | 19,395 | 47,930 | 30 June 1992 | Wilderness park |

=== Wilderness zones ===
There are 19 wilderness zones in Victoria, totalling 641,441 ha (1,585,040 acres) (15.98% of the state's protected areas) and all but 131 ha (320 acres) are located inside other protected areas.

- Bowen
- Buchan Headwaters
- Cape Howe
- Chinaman Flat
- Cobberas
- Galpunga
- Genoa
- Indi
- Minook
- Mount Cowra
- Mount Darling – Snowy Bluff
- North Wyperfeld
- Razor-Viking
- Sandpatch
- Snowy River
- South Wyperfeld
- Sunset
- Tingaringy
- Wilsons Promontory

=== Natural catchment area ===
There are 25 natural catchment areas in Victoria, totalling 151,368 ha (374,040 acres) (3.77% of the state's protected areas).

=== Remote and natural area ===
There are 24 remote and natural areas in Victoria, totalling 302,990 ha (748,700 acres) (7.55% of the state's protected areas).

=== Other reserves ===
In Victoria, there are a total of 2776 nature reserves, totalling 467,092 ha (1,154,210 acres) (11.64% of the state's protected areas) divided is the following different groups:

Bushland Reserve

There are 1592 bushland reserves in Victoria, totalling 45,305 ha (111,950 acres) (1.13% of the state's protected areas).

Cave Reserve

There are 9 cave reserves in Victoria, totalling 532 ha (1,310 acres) (0.01% of the state's protected areas).

Conservation park / reserve

There are 13 conservation parks / conservation reserves in Victoria, totalling 20,994 ha (51,880 acres) (0.52% of the state's protected areas).

Flora & Fauna Reserve

There are a total of 186 flora and/or fauna reserves in Victoria, totalling 119,632 ha (295,620 acres) (2.98% of the state's protected areas).

Geological Reserve

There are 14 geological reserves in Victoria, totalling 436 ha (1,080 acres) (0.01% of the state's protected areas).

Gippsland Lakes Reserve

There are 39 gippsland lakes reserves in Victoria, totalling 7,129 ha (17,620 acres) (0.18% of the state's protected areas).

Nature Conservation Reserve

There are 263 nature conservation reserves in Victoria, totalling 136,909 ha (338,310 acres) (3.41% of the state's protected areas).

Natural Features and Scenic Reserve

There are 49 natural features reserves in Victoria, totalling 10,402 ha (25,700 acres) (0.26% of the state's protected areas).
There are 50 scenic reserves in Victoria, totalling 9,649 ha (23,840 acres) (0.24% of the state's protected areas).
There are 24 combined natural features and scenic reserves in Victoria, totalling 19,799 ha (48,920 acres) (0.49% of the state's protected areas).

Streamside Reserve

There are 259 streamside reserves in Victoria, totalling 7,895 ha (19,510 acres) (0.2% of the state's protected areas).

Tall Trees Reserve

There is 1 tall trees reserve in Victoria, totalling 14 ha (35 acres).

Wildlife Reserve

There are 277 wildlife reserves in Victoria, totalling 88,396 ha (218,430 acres) (2.2% of the state's protected areas).

Some of the nature reserves include

- Dexter's Bush
- Deep Lead Nature Conservation Reserve
- Jackass Flat Nature Conservation Reserve
- Kurrawonga Reserve
- Long Forest Flora & Fauna Reserve
- Marble Gully - Mount Tambo Nature Conservation Reserve
- Mount Elizabeth Nature Conservation Reserve
- Mount Hope Nature Conservation Reserve
- Mullinger Swamp Wildlife Reserve
- The Spit Wildlife Reserve
- Snape Reserve
- Yellingbo Nature Conservation Reserve

== See also ==
- Protected areas of Australia
- Royal Botanic Gardens, Melbourne
