= Point Cook Coastal Park =

Protected area in Victoria, Australia

- IUCN category III (natural monument or feature)
- Location within Victoria
- Location: Victoria
- Nearest city: Point Cook
- Coordinates: 37°54′20″S 144°45′32″E
- Area: 8.63 km^{2} (3.33 sq mi)
- Established: 1978

The Point Cook Coastal Park covers an area of 863 hectares (2,130 acres) and includes the Cheetham Wetlands. The park extends from the RAAF Williams Point Cook Base northeast along the coast to the Laverton creek which comprises its northern boundary. The park is approximately 20 kilometres (12 mi) from Melbourne, Australia in a southwesterly direction along Port Phillip Bay. The park is adjoined by the Point Cook Marine Sanctuary, which extends around the point to the south and the east. The northwestern boundary to the park is residential housing.

== Description ==
The Point Cook Coastal Park was created in 1978 and officially opened for public use in 1982. The area was owned by the Melbourne and Metropolitan Board of Works until 1994. It was then managed by Melbourne Parks and Waterways up to 2001 before becoming Crown land. Management was then organized by Parks Victoria. The park is listed for public purposes under the Crown Land (Reserves) Act 1978. The park is located within the Victorian Volcanic Plains Bioregion.

The park is primarily used for recreational purposes however it has areas of high conservation significance such as Spectacle Lake and the Ramsar listed wetlands. It also has areas of historical and cultural significance. The parklands have a variety of facilities for visitors including shelters, barbecue areas, walking trails as well as an information centre. Activities undertaken in the park include picnicking, bushwalking, bird watching, swimming as well as learning about the heritage and conservation values of the area.

The parks vegetation has been altered over years of different land uses. The coastal park had been used for agricultural practices prior to reservation. Areas of the Cheetham Wetlands were used as salt evaporation pans since the 1920s. The park is now has a variety of vegetation types varying according to topography and other ecological values.

== Ecology ==
=== Terrestrial ===
The Point Cook Coastal Park and Cheetham Wetlands have seven different Ecological Vegetation Classes in different areas across the landscape.

- Plains Grassy Wetland
- Berm Grassy Wetland
- Estuarine Flats Grassland
- Coast Banksia Woodland
- Coastal Dune Scrub
- Coastal Saltmarsh
- Coastal Tussock Grassland

The wetlands and the eastern area of the coastal park are included in the Port Phillip Bay (Western Shoreline) and Bellarine Peninsula Ramsar site. Ramsar sites are considered of international conservation significance primarily due to the presence of threatened species or migratory shorebirds and water-birds. They also cover wetlands which are particularly rare or unusual for this biogeographical region. Together with the other Ramsar wetlands across the western shoreline and the Bellarine Peninsula, these areas of land provide valuable habitat for a number or rare or threatened species of both flora and fauna. The area supports 22 Victorian threatened flora species, two of which are considered endangered, four of which are classified as vulnerable, 12 considered rare as well as four species classified as poorly known and likely rare or worse condition.

Together with the other Ramsar sites in the area a total of 29 fauna species are supported that are listed under the Flora and Fauna Guarantee Act 1988. Seven of these are listed as critically endangered, 28 considered vulnerable, 14 classified endangered as well as 25 species of fauna that are considered near threatened. Also ten of these species are classified as threatened on a national level. Under the China-Australia Migratory Bird Agreement (CAMBA) the Ramsar sites in the area including the Point Cook Coastal Park provide habitat for 40 listed species of migratory bird. Under the Japan-Australia Migratory Bird Agreement (JAMBA) 36 species of migratory bird are listed. A further 49 species are also listed under the Bonn Convention on the Conservation of Migratory Species of Wild Animals. As well as the listed species of conservation significance the wetlands provide habitat for tens of thousands of shorebirds throughout the year. Victorian threatened species of bird that use the parklands or wetlands as habitat at some point of the year include the following. These three species are listed as endangered:

- Australian bustard (Ardeotis australis)
- Orange-bellied parrot (Neophema chrysogaster)
- Little tern (Sterna albifrons)

These three species are listed as vulnerable:

- Fairy tern (Sterna nereis)
- Plains-wanderer (Pedionomous torquatus)
- Hooded plover (Charadrius rubricolis)

These ten species are listed as rare:

- Blue-billed duck (Oxyura australis)
- Cape Barren goose (Cereopsis novaehollandiae)
- Freckled duck (Stictonetta naevosa)
- Grey goshawk (Accipiter novaehollandiae)
- Little bittern (Ixobrychus minutus)
- Brolga (Grus rubicundus)
- Eastern curlew (Numenius madagascariensis)
- White-bellied sea-eagle (Haliaeetus leucogaster)
- Black falcon (Falco subniger)
- Ground parrot (Pezoporus wallicus)

Threatened reptiles that may reside in the park include the rare swamp skink (Egernia conventryi) and the vulnerable striped legless lizard (Delma impar).

=== Marine ===
The Point Cooke Marine Sanctuary is 290 hectares (720 acres) in size and preserves 3.9 kilometres (2.4 mi) of coastline adjacent to the Point Cook Coastal Park. This sanctuary houses a variety of habitats including intertidal and subtidal reefs, sandy beaches, subtidal soft sediment reefs as well as seagrass beds. The reefs support an abundance of species including filter-feeders, invertebrate herbivores, sea stars, sea anemones, ascidians, crustaceans, sharks, shellfish as well as multiple fish species. The sanctuary is particularly important as its sandbanks provide habitat for approximately 50 species of shorebirds some of which are threatened. Threatened fish species that may use the sanctuary as habitat include:

- Yarra pigmy perch (Edelia obscura)
- Australian grayling (Prototroctes maraena)
- Spotted galaxias (Galaxias truttaceus)

== Cultural heritage ==
The Point Cook Coastal Park has cultural values for the original indigenous population. The Boon wurrung people have a number of significant sites throughout the park including stone artefact sites and middens. The majority of these important sites are near the coastline or near the Point Cook homestead. Protection of these areas is ongoing and involves the Boon wurrung people. The Point Cook Homestead also has cultural significance and is listed on the Victorian Heritage Register. The Homestead and gardens was built in 1857.

== Environmental threats ==
=== Introduced species ===
Introduced species are one of the largest problems that the parklands face. Pest plants and animals can severely degrade ecosystems as well as out-compete native species for breeding sites, habitat or food sources. Weed species are very resilient and have the potential to change the structure and composition of the already fragmented floristic communities of the park. The following weed species are a particular threat:

- Serrated tussock
- Spiny rush
- African boxthorn
- Artichoke thistle
- Fennel
- Gorse
- Pampas grass
- Flax-leaf broom
- Italian buckthorn

Pest animals have also been recognized as a serious threat to the parklands. Habitat and food resources are taken by pest rodents such as rats, rabbits and mice. These species also lead to land degradation and erosion as they are ground dwelling fauna. This damage to grassland and wetland ecosystems leads to further opportunities for the spread of exotic plant species that prefer disturbed soils. Native wildlife are preyed upon by feral and domestic cats, dogs as well as foxes. Feral cats and foxes also negatively impact on shorebird populations especially when species are roosting or are flightless. There are also marine and intertidal pest species present at the coastal park. The sabellid fan worm (Sabella spallanzanii) and the northern Pacific sea star (Asterias amurensis) both reside along the western shoreline of Port Phillip Bay and are very successful at spreading and out-competing native species.

=== Erosion ===
Erosion of soils and sediments from coastal dune habitats as well as from saltmarshes and sand flats is a threat to the structure and composition of these coastal communities. Erosion occurs predominantly from wind and wave actions but can be increased by reducing vegetation cover or reducing stability in other ways. It can also be increased by high levels of human traffic or the public accessing areas of wetland that are off limits to the public.

=== Water regimes and pollution ===
The water in the Cheetham Wetlands is dependent on the pumping of water from Skeleton Creek. Pumping of water from the estuary must continue for the wetlands to flourish and maintain diversity in habitats as well as fauna species. Pollution of waterways and lakes is a real threat to the biodiversity of the parklands. Pollutants from sewage discharge points in Port Phillip Bay include elevated levels of Nitrogen. Other pollutants that need to be reduced come from storm-water runoff, such as heavy metals, oils, and litter. There is also the potential threat of pollutants in runoff after heavy rainfall events, which can include biocides, sediments and nutrients. This can lead to blooms of blue-green algae if nutrient levels are high. Pumping of water from the Skeleton Creek during periods of high runoff may lead to the accumulation of these pollutants in the wetlands. Litter, especially plastics have the potential to harm or kill wildlife in the park and in the marine sanctuary as waterbirds and marine mammals often consume or get trapped in these plastic that don't break down.

=== Public access ===
Some visitors to the park can have detrimental impacts on the flora and fauna of the area. Accessing areas of the park such as the wetlands that are off limits to the public without a guide can lead to degradation, soil compaction, erosion, introducing species as well as disturbing birds on feeding grounds or roosting sites. Disturbing bird species that are breeding, feeding or roosting can lead to decreased survival rates particularly for species that are specialized. Access to areas of the park by vehicles in the past has also been damaging to the fragmented communities present.

== Management and benefits ==
Management of the Point Cook Coastal Park is undertaken by Parks Victoria and encompasses managing recreation, environmental conservation, indigenous heritage and non-indigenous heritage. Due to the variety of important areas that require management the park has been split into seven zones that have different management goals and plans. The Linking People and Spaces strategy is used by Parks Victoria to accommodate public access and recreation activities whilst still maintaining sustainability and environmental responsibility. This plan acts to prioritize vegetation protection and restoration as well as ensure public access to abundant open spaces around Melbourne.

The park aims to educate visitors and nearby residents on the importance of the areas cultural and natural values. This helps maintain high levels of respect for the ecosystems and heritage of the area.

Environmental priorities within the park include maintaining control programs for introduced species of plant and animal. Other strategies include monitoring species of conservation significance and then developing targeted management regimes for those threatened species. The mapping of the quality and distribution of the various habitats is also vital so that high quality ecological communities can continue to exist in the park. Another important management strategy is working with the local residents and the Wyndham city council to the west of the park and ensure they restrain domestic animals from entering the park and causing harm to the native wildlife.

The maintenance of the hydrological cycle for the Cheetham Wetlands is crucial in maintaining a high quality and diverse wetlands. Therefore, additional pumping infrastructure is planned so that a greater quantity of water can be pumped from the Skeleton Creek. Parks Victoria is also working in conjunction with the Wyndham City Council so that urban development on the west side of the park has little or no negative environmental impact.

The inclusion of the eastern part of the park in the Port Phillip Bay and Bellarine Peninsula Ramsar Site has also increased the protection levels for the area as it is considered of international conservation importance. Objectives under the Ramsar convention range from protecting and enhancing ecosystem processes and habitats to preventing processes from having adverse effects on the wetlands and coastal communities. Monitoring programs and limiting degrading processes like erosion are crucial for maintaining the high levels of biodiversity in the park as well as providing vital safe habitat for threatened species. Continued levels of high quality habitat both for inland waterways and coastal zones is very important for migratory birds that use the area at certain times of the year. An example of this is the orange-bellied parrot which is critically endangered largely due to habitat loss.

== See also ==
- Protected areas of Victoria
