= Deep Lead Nature Conservation Reserve =

Protected area in Victoria, Australia

- IUCN category Ia (strict nature reserve)
- Location within Victoria
- Location: Victoria
- Nearest city: Stawell.
- Coordinates: 37.02°S 142.75°E
- Area: 1,120 ha (4.3 sq mi)
- Established: August 1982
- Governing body: Parks Victoria
- Website: Official website

Deep Lead Nature Conservation Reserve is a protected area in the Australian state of Victoria located in the state's west on the north side of the town centre in Stawell. The area was formerly used for gold mining but now contains a variety of Eucalyptus which provide habitat for a range of birds and mammals, including some endangered species. Several species of rare ground orchids also grow in the reserve.

The Djab Wurrung and Jardwadjali people are the traditional owners of the Deep Lead area. Deep Lead was established as a gold-mining area shortly after the Australasian Mining Company found the "Australasian Lead" in 1867. The first shaft was abandoned after nearly ten years due to flooding and in 1878 a second shaft was sunk nearby to a depth of 80 m (300 ft). On 12 December 1882, workers accidentally broke into the abandoned workings and water began flooding the new shaft. In spite of frantic efforts by boilermen working pumps, only five of the 27 miners escaped. Most of the mining equipment has been removed but the depression of the flooded shaft is visible and a cairn and trees mark the site of the tragedy.

The Deep Lead Nature Conservation Reserve was first established in 1982 when 1,120 hectares (2,800 acres) were set aside and in 2002 a further 750.6 hectares (1,855 acres) were added. There is an extensive track network throughout the reserve but there are no camping facilities and prospecting and fossicking are not permitted.

About 350 species of native plants occur in the reserve. The eucalypts include red ironbark (Eucalyptus tricarpa), yellow gum (Eucalyptus leucoxylon), yellow box (Eucalyptus melliodora), long-leaf box (Eucalyptus goniocalyx), red stringybark (Eucalyptus obliqua), river red gum (Eucalyptus camaldulensis) and grey box (Eucalyptus microcarpa). Wattles, particularly golden wattle (Acacia pycnantha) are common in the understorey and rare orchids are sometimes seen. Many bird and mammal species are also common here and the endangered swift parrot (Lathamus discolor) is sometimes seen. The endangered squirrel glider (Petaurus norfolcensis) is nocturnal and rarely observed.

As of 2016, the reserve was classified as an IUCN Category IA protected area.

== See also ==
- Protected areas of Victoria
