= Hibbertia samaria =

Scientific classification
- Kingdom: Plantae
- Clade: Tracheophytes
- Clade: Angiosperms
- Clade: Eudicots
- Order: Dilleniales
- Family: Dilleniaceae
- Genus: Hibbertia
- Species: H. samaria

Binomial name
- Hibbertia samaria Toelken

Species of flowering plant

Hibbertia samaria is a species of flowering plant in the family Dilleniaceae and is endemic to Victoria, Australia. It is a small, low-lying or mat-forming shrub with hairy foliage, linear leaves and yellow flowers with ten to fifteen stamens arranged around three hairy carpels.

== Description ==
Hibbertia samaria is a low-lying or mat-forming shrub that typically grows to a height of up to 15 cm (5.9 in) with branches up to 30 cm (12 in) long and hairy foliage. The leaves are linear, mostly 4–7 mm (0.16–0.28 in) long and 1–2 mm (0.039–0.079 in) wide on a petiole 0.2–0.6 mm (0.0079–0.0236 in) long. The flowers are arranged singly on the ends of the branches on a peduncle 5–12 mm (0.20–0.47 in) long with linear bracts mostly 1.5–2 mm (0.059–0.079 in) long at the base. The five sepals are joined at the base and covered with star-shaped hairs, the outer sepal lobes 5.8–6.5 mm (0.23–0.26 in) long and 2.6–2.8 mm (0.10–0.11 in) wide and the inner lobes broader. The five petals are broadly egg-shaped with the narrower end towards the base, yellow, up to 15.8 mm (0.62 in) long with ten to fifteen stamens arranged around three hairy carpels, each carpel with four to six ovules.

== Taxonomy ==
Hibbertia samaria was first formally described in 2013 by Hellmut R. Toelken in the Journal of the Adelaide Botanic Gardens from specimens collected near the Mount Samaria State Park in 1996. The specific epithet (samaria) refers to the Mount Samaria State Park, where several specimens were recorded.

== Distribution and habitat ==
This hibbertia grows in grassy forest, usually in rocky places near Mount Samaria and near branches of the Macalister River in central Victoria.

== See also ==
- List of Hibbertia species
