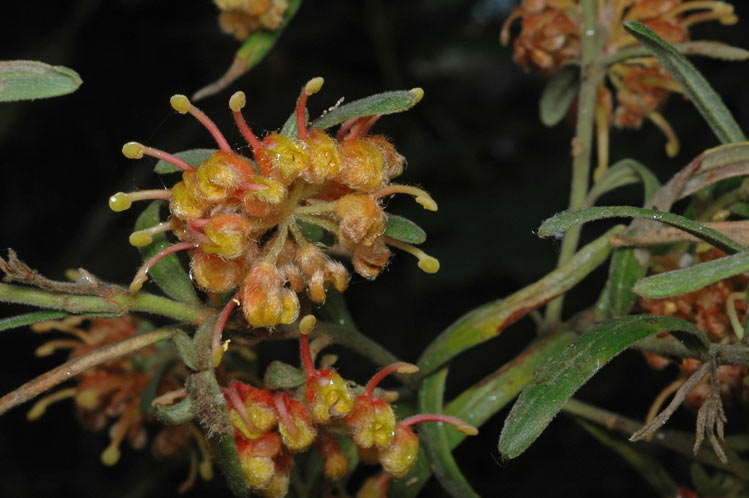
- In the Australian National Botanic Gardens

Scientific classification
- Kingdom: Plantae
- Clade: Tracheophytes
- Clade: Angiosperms
- Clade: Eudicots
- Order: Proteales
- Family: Proteaceae
- Genus: Grevillea
- Species: G. polybractea

Binomial name
- Grevillea polybractea H.B.Will.

= Grevillea polybractea =

Species of shrub endemic to Australia

Grevillea polybractea, commonly known as crimson grevillea, is a species of flowering plant in the family Proteaceae and is endemic to the southeast of continental Australia. It is a spreading shrub with linear to narrowly oblong or narrowly elliptic leaves and pink to red and yellow or green flowers.

== Description ==
Grevillea polybractea is a spreading shrub that typically grows to a height of 0.3–1.8 m (1 ft 0 in – 5 ft 11 in) and has many branches. Its leaves are linear to narrowly oblong or narrowly elliptic, 25–75 mm (0.98–2.95 in) long and 1–6 mm (0.039–0.236 in) wide, the edges rolled under, sometimes obscuring the lower surface which is otherwise hairy. The flowers are arranged in downturned, more or less spherical clusters of 10 to 20 flowers on a rachis 3–10 mm (0.12–0.39 in) long with many egg-shaped bracts 2.5–7 mm (0.098–0.276 in) long. The flowers are pink to red and yellow or green with a reddish style, the pistil 9.5–14 mm (0.37–0.55 in) long. Flowering occurs from October to December and the fruit is a hairy follicle 12–15 mm (0.47–0.59 in) long.

== Taxonomy ==
Grevillea polybractea was first formally described in 1927 by Herbert Bennett Williamson in The Victorian Naturalist. The specific epithet (polybractea) means "many bracts".

== Distribution and habitat ==
Crimson grevillea grows in forest with a scrubby understorey, and occurs south of Dubbo and west of Khancoban in New South Wales, and between Corryong and Mount Granya in far north-eastern Victoria.

== Conservation status ==
This grevillea is listed as "endangered" under the Victorian Government Flora and Fauna Guarantee Act 1988 and as "rare in Victoria" on the Department of Sustainability and Environment's Advisory List of Rare or Threatened Plants in Victoria. 26
