= Lake Tyers State Park =

Protected area in Victoria, Australia

- IUCN category III (natural monument or feature)
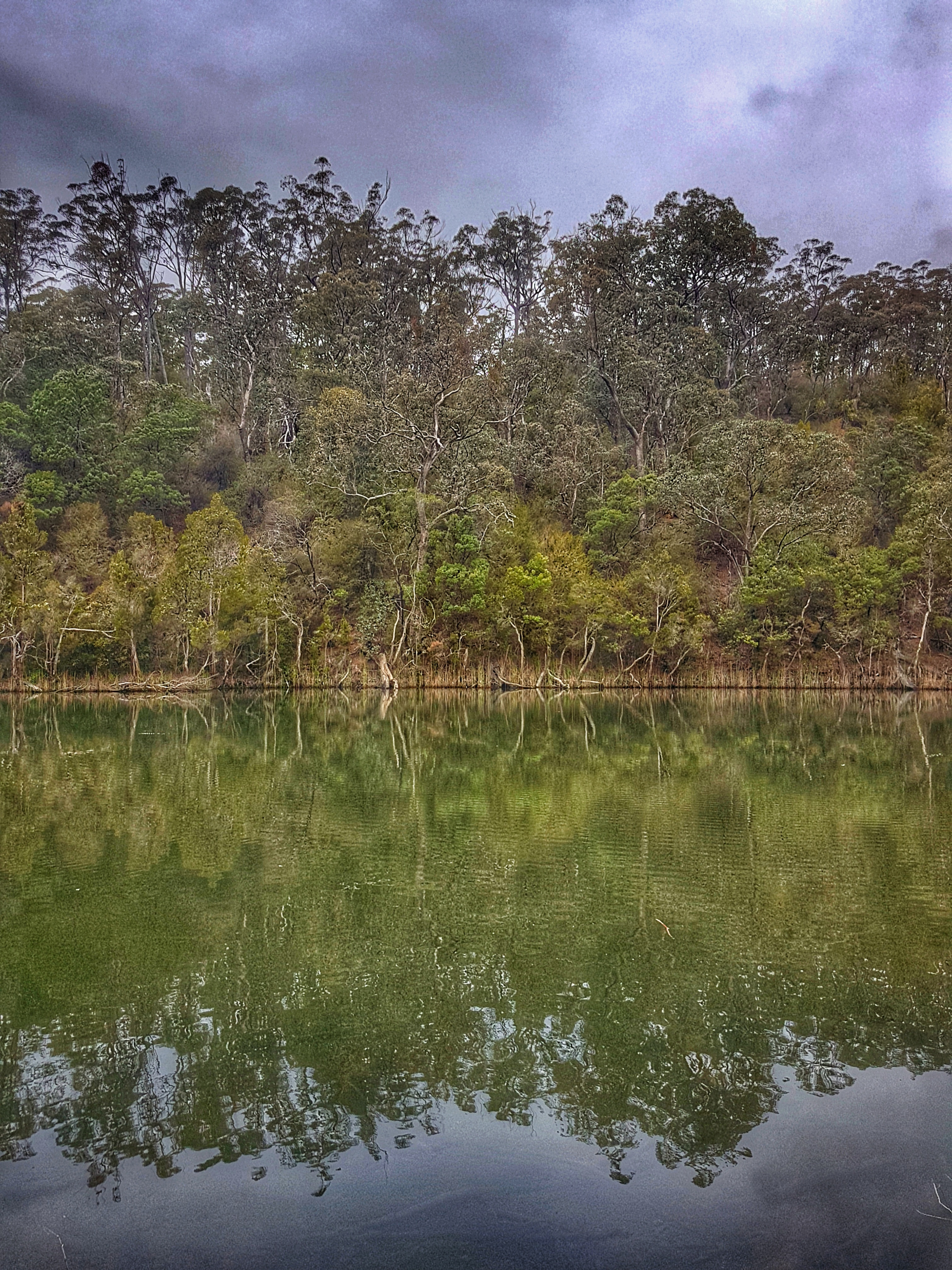
- Lake Tyers

- Location within Victoria
- Location: Victoria
- Nearest city: Nowa Nowa
- Coordinates: 37°46′0″S 148°5′21″E
- Area: 86.8 km^{2} (33.5 sq mi)
- Established: 2012
- Governing body: Parks Victoria
- Website: www.parks.vic.gov.au/places-to-see/parks/lake-tyers-state-park

Lake Tyers State Park is a protected area located in East Gippsland, Victoria, Australia. It is situated approximately 20 kilometres (12 mi) northeast of Lakes Entrance and covers an area of around 8,700-hectare (21,000-acre). The park protects diverse forest and coastal ecosystems and has strong cultural significance to the Gunaikurnai people, the traditional owners of the land.

== History ==
The area now known as Lake Tyers State Park has been significant to the Gunaikurnai people for thousands of years. In the colonial period, the area was the site of the Lake Tyers Aboriginal Mission, which later became a focus of Indigenous land rights in Victoria.

Prior to becoming a state park, the land was reserved under the Forests Act 1958 as a forest park. On 31 March 2012, the area was officially proclaimed as Lake Tyers State Park under the National Parks Act 1975 (Vic.), giving it a higher level of environmental protection and recognition.

Since 2010, the park has been jointly managed by Parks Victoria and the Gunaikurnai Land and Waters Aboriginal Corporation under the terms of the Recognition and Settlement Agreement between the Gunaikurnai people and the Victorian Government.

== Geography and environment ==
The park stretches from the eastern shores of Lake Tyers to the forests and hills that rise inland. It features a range of landscapes including:

- Coastal heathlands
- Dry and damp forests
- Lakes, rivers, and wetlands
- Sandy beaches and estuarine systems

The park supports a rich diversity of flora and fauna, including several threatened species such as the powerful owl, swamp skink, and glossy black cockatoo.

== Cultural significance ==
Lake Tyers State Park includes many sites of Aboriginal cultural heritage, such as middens, scarred trees, and former camping places. The area remains a vital place for the Gunaikurnai people for cultural practices and community connection.

The park is managed through a joint management plan that integrates traditional knowledge with contemporary conservation practices.

== Recreation ==
Popular recreational activities in Lake Tyers State Park include:

- Bushwalking
- Birdwatching
- Camping
- Fishing
- Canoeing and kayaking

Designated camping areas include Trident Arm, Happy Valley, and Toorloo Arm, with some facilities for visitors. Parts of the park are accessible by two-wheel-drive and four-wheel-drive vehicles.

== See also ==
- Protected areas of Victoria
