= Plenty Gorge Park =

Park in Victoria, Australia

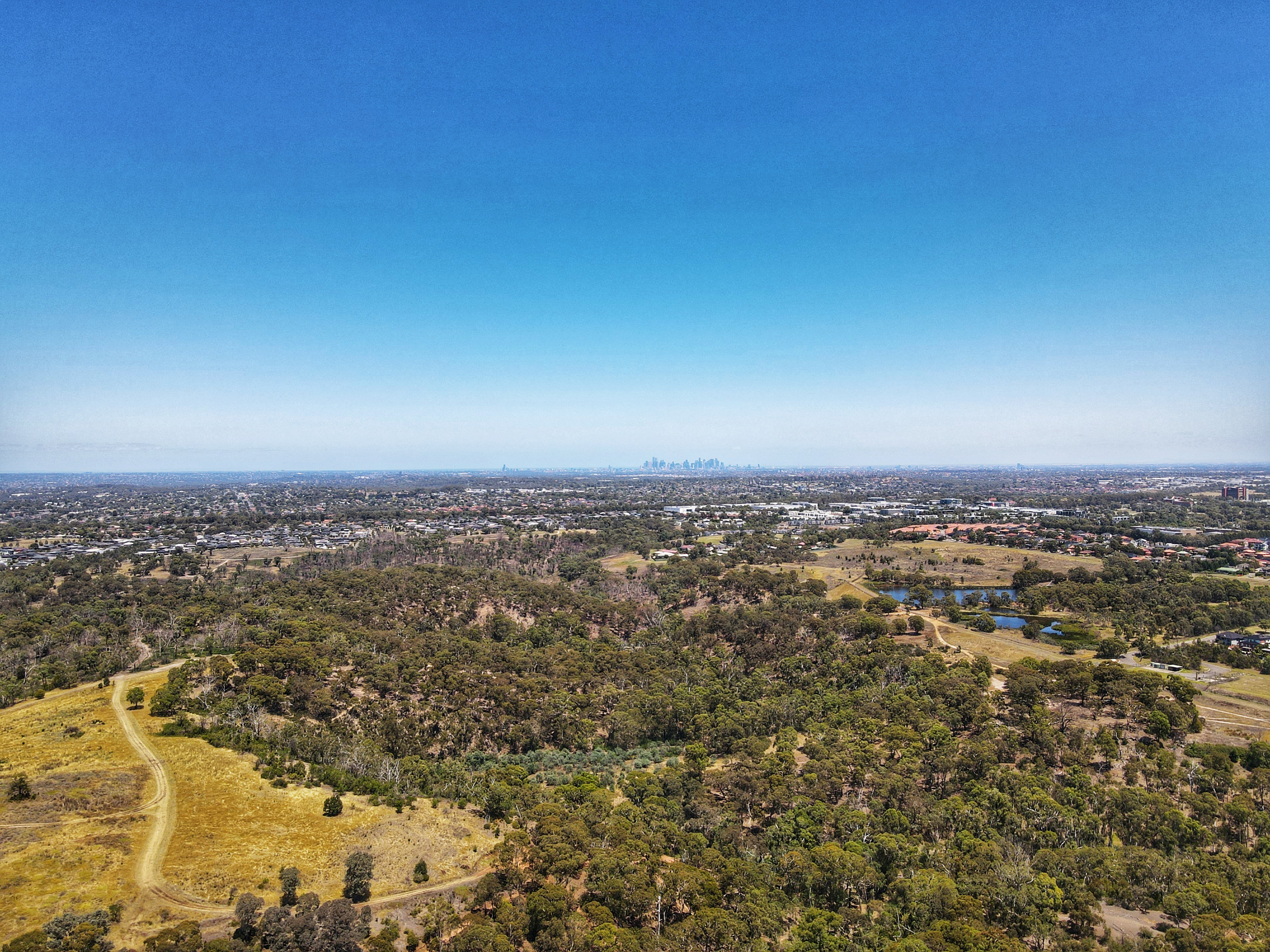
- Yellow Gum Park within the Plenty Gorge Parklands
- Interactive map of Plenty Gorge Park
- Type: Metropolitan regional park
- Location: Bundoora, Victoria, Australia
- Coordinates: 37.6826°S 145.0772°E
- Area: 1,350 hectares (3,300 acres)
- Manager: Parks Victoria

Plenty Gorge Park is a 1,350-hectare (3,300-acre) metropolitan regional park in the north-eastern Melbourne suburb of Bundoora.

The park extends 11km along the Plenty River and encompasses sites including the Hawkstowe and Yarrambat picnic areas, Middle Gorge, Nioka Bush Camp and the Yellow Gum Recreation Area. However, these sites generally operate independently rather than as components of the broader parklands.

== History ==
The park was initially occupied by the Wurundjeri people until the arrival of the Europeans in Australia in the 1830s. By 1837, pastoral squatters claimed large areas of land for their sheep and cattle. In 1841 the area was considered a “settled district” within Port Phillip, and all suitable land for agriculture west of the Plenty River was sold off by the government for private ownership by the mid-1840s. In the 1980s the Victorian State Government recognised need to protect the natural and heritage features of the park for future generations.

The park was expanded again with the purchase of the Boral quarry in Plenty by Parks Victoria in 1997. It had closed in the early 1970s due to groundwater seeping through. After two years, it was developed into Yellow Gum Park (and Blue Lake) and opened to the public in 1999.

The landscape at Plenty Gorge Park has been changed over time as a result of settlement of the area. Previous native woodlands, grasslands and forests are now farmland and residential areas due to the clearing of vegetation.

On 30 December 2019, a bushfire which started at the Tanunda Wetlands area of the park, burned approximately 65 hectares (160 acres) of land and resulted in temporary closures of park spaces. By 27 January 2021, all affected areas had reopened to the public. In response to the fires, Melbourne Water and Parks Victoria underwent several conservation and rehabilitation efforts in the park.

Following two rounds of community consultations in 2020 and 2021, the Victoria State Government announced several upgrades to the park as part of the Andrews Government’s $315 million Suburban Parks Program. The program includes the development of a new Plenty River Trail which runs through the Plenty Gorge Park, five new lookouts, two new bridges and upgrades to the Hawkstowe Picnic Area and Nioka Bush Camp. Final designs were released to the public on 4 June 2022.

== Geography ==
The park lies between two distinct landscapes: undulating hills and ridges on the eastern side and a flat basalt plain on the western side. The hills and ridges of the eastern side of the park were formed between 400 and 430 million years ago during the Silurian period. The Plenty River flows around 24 kilometres (15 mi) through the park and has carved through softer sedimentary rocks to form a steep gorge. The Plenty River continues to erode the gorge today.

Of all parks in the Greater Melbourne area, Plenty Gorge Park has the greatest diversity of natural habitats. Major landscapes in the park include the Plenty River and gorge, woodlands, wetlands, parklands and pastures. There are 631 native flora species recorded in the park.

The park supports a contains a variety of ecological vegetation classes (EVCs) such as escarpment shrubland, creekline grassy woodland, creekline herb-rich woodland, floodplain riparian woodland, swampy riparian complex, riparian scrub, plains grassy wetland, box ironbark forest, plains grassy woodland, and valley grassy forest.

== Features ==
The park includes the Hawkstowe and Yarrambat picnic areas, Middle Gorge, Nioka Bush Camp and the Yellow Gum Recreation Area and is used by local communities for recreational activities such as community events, festivals, large gatherings, nature-based activities, exercise and orienteering.

The park also has 262 recorded native fauna species. Over 200 bird species, several reptiles, kangaroos, wallabies, echidnas can be seen in the park. The Plenty River is also habitat to numerous fish species and other river vertebrates.
