= Banksia Park =

Banksia Park may refer to:

- Banksia Park, South Australia, a northeastern suburb of Adelaide
- Banksia Park (Victoria), a park on the banks of the Yarra River east of Melbourne
