= Princess Margaret Rose Cave =

Cave in southwestern Victoria, Australia

- Location within Victoria
- Location: Lower Glenelg NP, Victoria, Australia
- Coordinates: 37°59′21″S 140°59′26″E
- Depth: 50 feet (15 m)
- Length: 500 feet (150 m)
- Discovery: unknown (Aboriginal Australians); 1936 (colonial explorers)
- Geology: TertiaryLimestone
- Show cave opened: 1941

The Princess Margaret Rose Cave is a limestone cave located in Lower Glenelg National Park in south-western Victoria, Australia. The cave features actively growing stalactites, stalagmites, and helictites.

== History ==
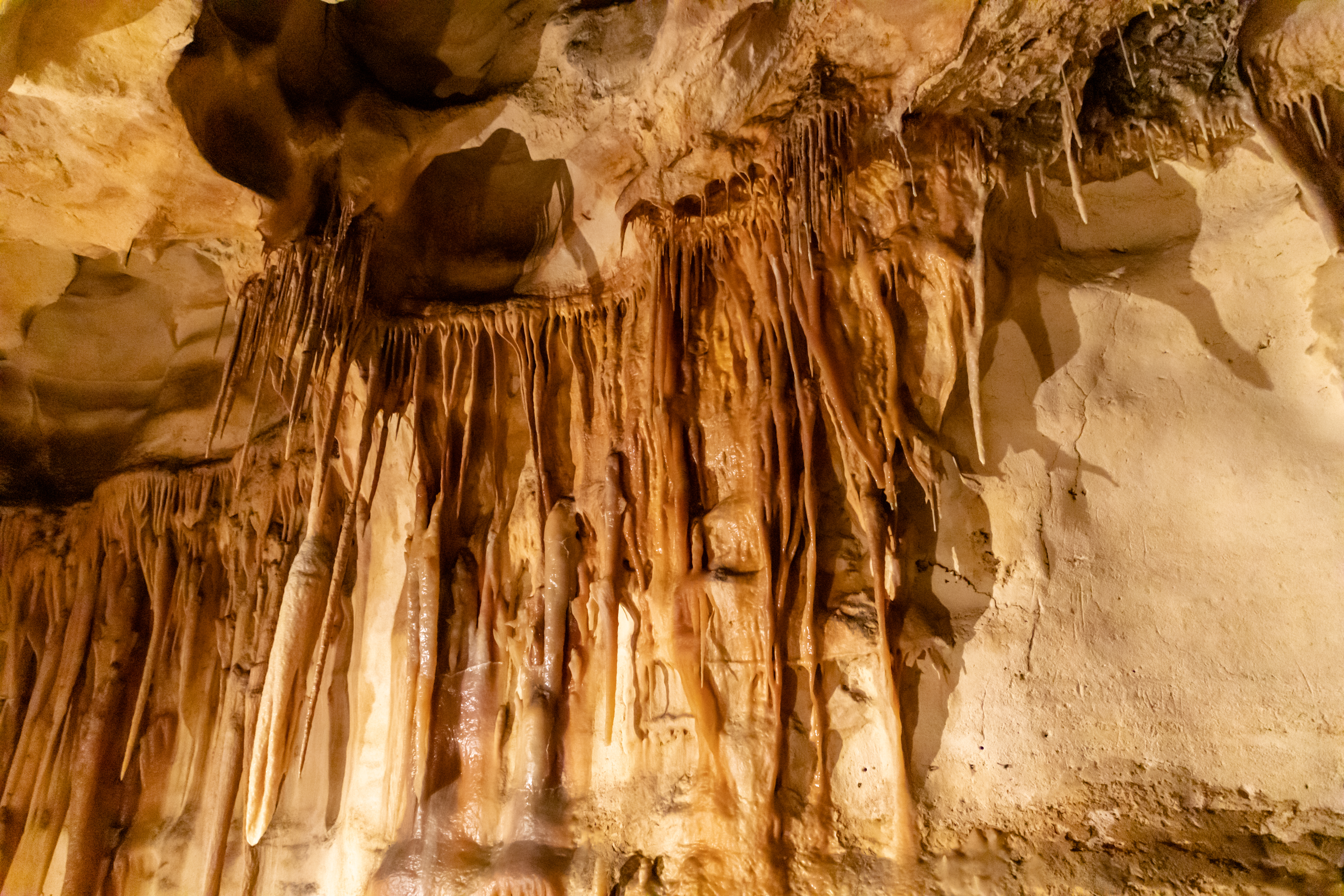
Inside the cave (2019)

The cave was "discovered" on 7 September 1936 by Keith McEachern, an adjoining property owner, who held a grazing licence over the State Forest, together with local rabbit trapper Jack “Bunny” Hutchesson and his two sons Allan and Bernard. McEachern was then lowered on ropes down the 50-foot (15 m) vertical shaft into the cave and conducted an initial search using candles and an old hurricane lantern.

McEachern and Bunny Hutchesson subsequently obtained a forest produce licence to remove bat guano from the cave to sell as fertiliser. In 1939, they sought another long-term lease from the Forests Commission to develop the cave as a tourist attraction. With the assistance of a retired gold miner from Western Australia, Charles Hirth, they excavated fissures in the soft rock to link the caverns together, and drove a 45-degree shaft provide better public access.

Meanwhile, in 1939, Bunny's daughter, Nancy Hutchesson, wrote to Buckingham Palace seeking permission to name the cave after Princess Margaret Rose, the future Queen Elizabeth's younger sister.

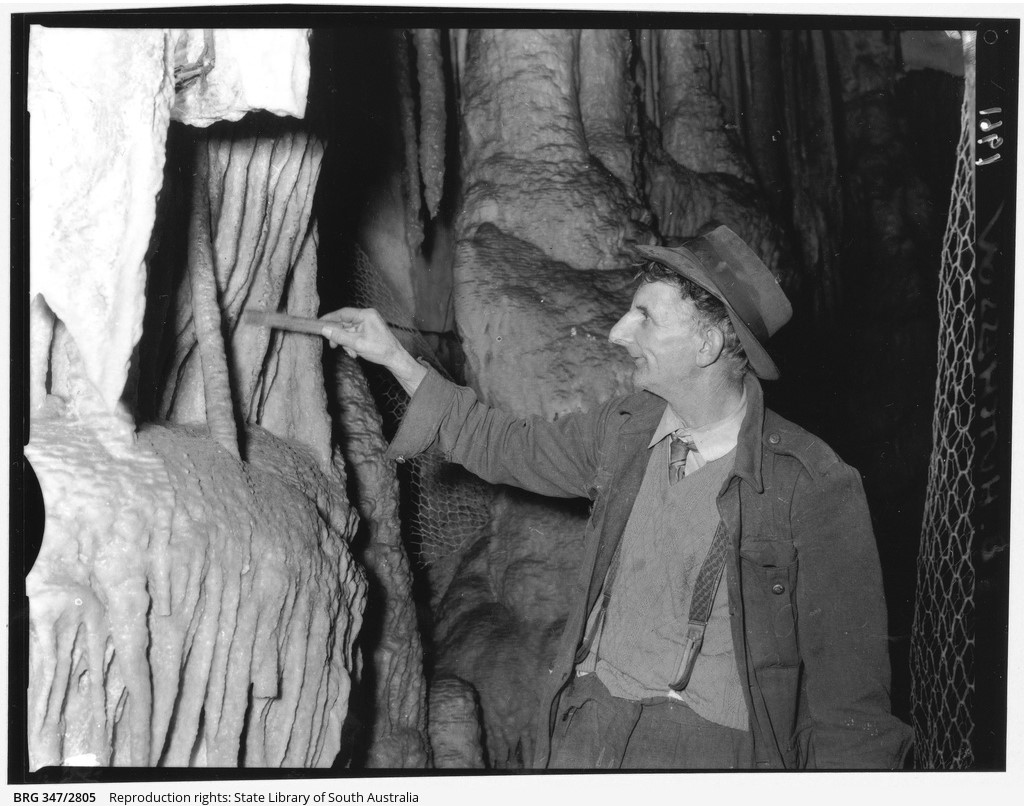
Mr Jack "Bunny" Hutchesson in the Princess Margaret Rose Caves in 1961.

The cave was opened to the public on 4 January 1941, with 40 electric lights lit from a 32-volt generator driven by a noisy motorcycle engine.

It took until 1944 before the last tunnel was completed, allowing the public to travel through the whole cave system. Bunny Hutchesson and his family then operated the cave and conducted tours until he retired in 1970.

The Forests Commission began developing the cave surrounds in 1968 when 45 acres (18 ha) was declared a Scenic Reserve. The Commission took control on 1 September 1970 using casual guides.

Improvements included reconstructing the old access road, a new residence for the warden, camping ground upgrades, toilet blocks and picnic facilities, a new visitor centre as well as a more reliable 240V mains power supply.

Bob Allen was the District Forester at Rennick at the time, and responsible for the transition. Frank Buchanan was appointed as permanent Cave Warden in 1972 and Russell Hall succeeded him in 1974.

Under the stewardship of the Forests Commission visitor numbers grew from 13,000 in 1970/71 to 22,000 by 1972/73. The focus was attracting family groups with a low entry fee of 30c for adults, and 10c for children

In 1973, the Land Conservation Council recommended the Princess Margaret Rose Cave be added to the enlarged Lower Glenelg National Park, but it took until 1 December 1980 for a handover to take place.

The cave has been closed since the COVID-19 pandemic in 2021, and the visitors' centre has fallen into disrepair. As of November 2026, work has started on upgrading the facilities, and the government intends to reopen it by the end of 2027.

== Description ==
Princess Margaret Rose Cave was formed in poorly-consolidated Tertiary limestone laid down in a shallow sea in the Oligocene and early Miocene geological epochs, between about 35 and 15 million years ago.

It is located in Lower Glenelg National Park in south-western Victoria, Australia. The cave features actively growing stalactites, stalagmites, and helictites.

It is said to be the most decorated cave per square metre anywhere in Australia. The cave is not large when compared to Buchan caves in eastern Victoria, as it extends only 500 feet from the entrance. At its deepest point the floor of the cave is approximately 50 feet below the surface.

Princess Margaret Rose Cave is about 2 km (1.2 mi) from the South Australian border and is also accessible by boat along the Glenelg River about 17 km (11 mi) upstream from the small seaside settlement of Nelson, Victoria.

The cave is under the stewardship of Forests Commission Victoria.

== See also ==
- Protected areas of Victoria
