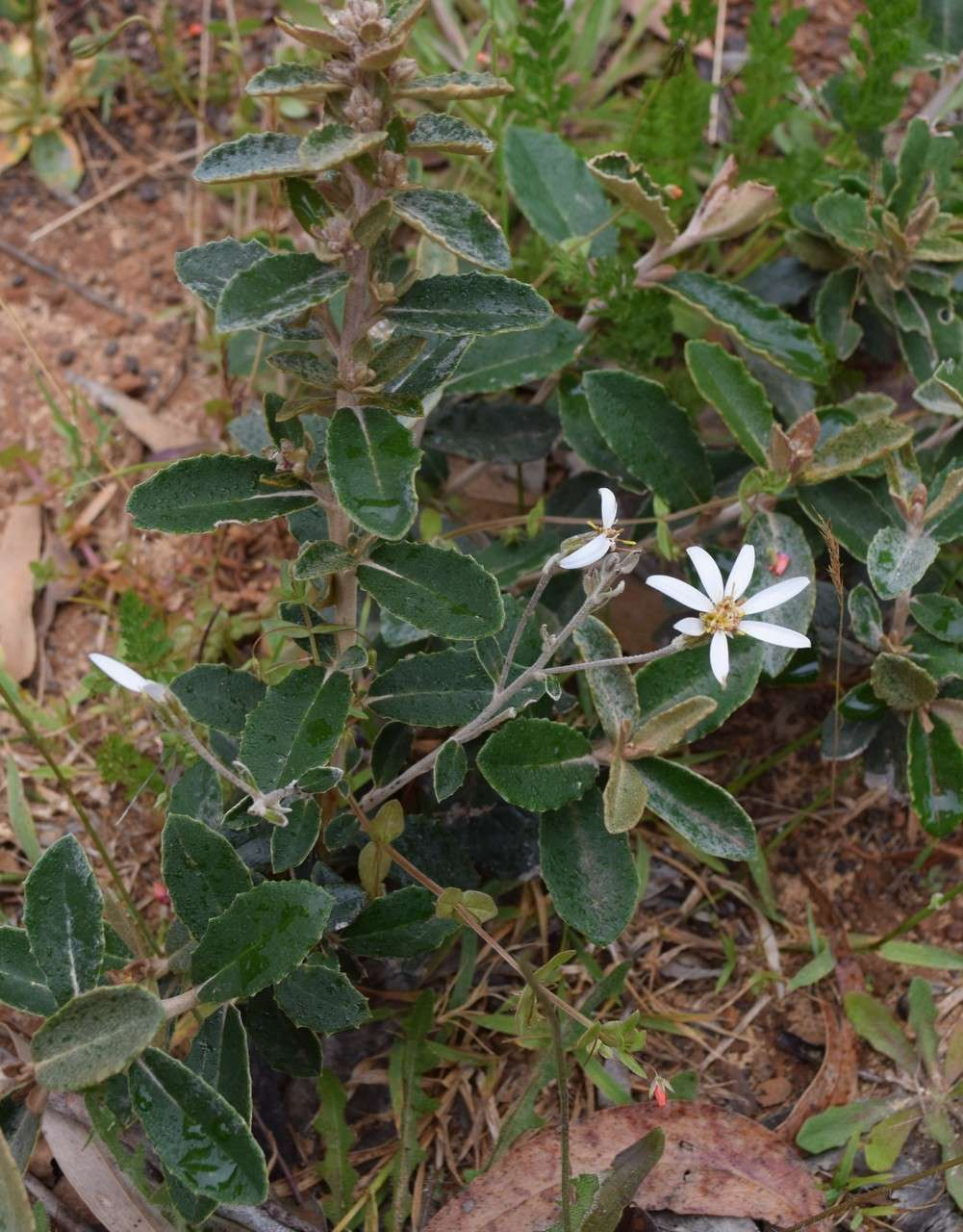
- Near Cobboboonee National Park

Scientific classification
- Kingdom: Plantae
- Clade: Tracheophytes
- Clade: Angiosperms
- Clade: Eudicots
- Clade: Asterids
- Order: Asterales
- Family: Asteraceae
- Genus: Olearia
- Species: O. speciosa

Binomial name
- Olearia speciosa Hutch.

= Olearia speciosa =

Species of plant

Olearia speciosa is a species of flowering plant in the family Asteraceae and is endemic to Victoria in Australia. It is a straggly, open shrub with egg-shaped to elliptic leaves, and white and yellow or brownish, daisy-like inflorescences.

== Description ==
Olearia rudis is a straggly, open shrub that typically grows to a height of up to about 1 m (3 ft 3 in), its branchlets densely woolly-hairy with white to fawn or pinkish hairs. It has egg-shaped to elliptic leaves 20–80 mm (0.79–3.15 in) long and 8–40 mm (0.31–1.57 in) wide on a petiole up to 1 mm (0.039 in) long. The edges of the leaves have irregular teeth and the lower surface is densely woolly-hairy. The heads or daisy-like "flowers" are arranged in loose corymbs on a peduncle 10–50 mm (0.39–1.97 in) and are 22–35 mm (0.87–1.38 in) in diameter. Each head has 4 to 7 white ray florets, the ligule 9–13 mm (0.35–0.51 in) long, surrounding 10 to 14 yellow or brownish disc florets. Flowering occurs from November to January and the fruit is a glabrous achene, the pappus 4.5–6.0 mm (0.18–0.24 in) long.

== Taxonomy ==
Olearia speciosa was first formally described in 1907 by John Hutchinson in The Botanical Magazine from plants raised from seed collected in the Botanic Gardens, Melbourne in 1888. The specific epithet (speciosa) means "showy".

== Distribution and habitat ==
This olearia grows in scattered locations in cool, moist forest in southern Victoria.

== Conservation status ==
Olearia speciosa is listed as "poorly known in Victoria" on the Department of Sustainability and Environment's Advisory List of Rare Or Threatened Plants In Victoria.
