= Great South West =

Great South West may refer to:

- Great South West Road, in South West England
- Great South West Walk, in Australia
