= Kurrawonga Reserve =

Nature reserve in Western Victoria

Coordinates: 38.029667°S 141.001694°E

Kurrawonga Reserve is a 40-hectare private conservation property managed by Nature Glenelg Trust in western Victoria, Australia. It is located near the town of Nelson and borders the Lower Glenelg National Park.

== History ==
The property was donated by Bill and Kate Moore's adult children in 2018 to Nature Glenelg Trust. The Moore family previously used Kurrawonga as a weekender where the family would retreat from Mount Gambier to a cottage within the brown stringy-bark and manna gum forest. Following its acquisition by Nature Glenelg Trust, there are ongoing efforts to ensure the intact remnant bushland remains in an excellent condition.

== Ecology ==
Kurrawonga Reserve is notable as an area of intact remnant bushland in excellent condition and for being an adjoining area to the Lower Glenelg National Park. It hosts a wide range of native mammals including Red-necked wallabies, Brushtail possum, Echidna, Southern brown bandicoot and the near threatened Swamp antechinus.

=== Mammals ===
Common name	Scientific name	Records
Common Brushtail Possum	Trichosurus vulpecula	377
Swamp Wallaby	Wallabia bicolor	99
Red-necked Wallaby	Notamacropus rufogriseus banksianus	45
Short-beaked Echidna	Tachyglossus aculeatus	34
Southern Brown Bandicoot (eastern)	Isoodon obesulus obesulus	13
Eastern grey kangaroo	Macropus giganteus	8
Koala	Phascolarctos cinereus	3
Fox	Vulpes vulpes	3
Southern Brown Bandicoot	Isoodon obesulus	2
Long-nosed Potoroo	Potorous tridactylus trisulcatus	2
Common Ringtail Possum	Pseudocheirus peregrinus	2
Bush Rat	Rattus fuscipes	2
Swamp Antechinus	Antechinus minimus maritimus	1
Sugar Glider	Petaurus breviceps	1

=== Birds ===
Common name	Scientific name	Records
Common Bronzewing	Phaps (Phaps) chalcoptera	20
Emu	Dromaius novaehollandiae	10
Australian Magpie	Gymnorhina tibicen	9
Grey Shrike-thrush	Colluricincla (Colluricincla) harmonica	8
Grey Currawong	Strepera (Neostrepera) versicolor	8
Grey Fantail	Rhipidura (Rhipidura) albiscapa	7
Red Wattlebird	Anthochaera (Anthochaera) carunculata	6
Galah	Eolophus roseicapilla	6
Eastern Yellow Robin	Eopsaltria (Eopsaltria) australis	6
Crimson Rosella	Platycercus (Platycercus) elegans	6
Brown Thornbill	Acanthiza (Acanthiza) pusilla	5
White-throated Treecreeper	Cormobates leucophaea	5
Rufous Bristlebird	Dasyornis (Maccoyornis) broadbenti	5
New Holland Honeyeater	Phylidonyris (Meliornis) novaehollandiae	5
White-browed Scrubwren	Sericornis (Sericornis) frontalis	5

=== Reptiles ===
Common name	Scientific name	Records
Highlands Forest-skink	Anepischetosia maccoyi	1
Striated Worm-lizard	Aprasia striolata	1
Pale-flecked Garden Sunskink	Lampropholis guichenoti	1
White's Skink	Liopholis whitii	1
Southern Grass Skink	Pseudemoia entrecasteauxii	1

== Conservation significance ==
At the lower reaches of the Glenelg River, Kurrawonga Reserve, together with Lower Glenelg National Park, lies within one of Australia's 15 national biodiversity hotspots.

== See also ==
- Lower Glenelg National Park
- Protected areas of Victoria (Australia)
