= Broken-Boosey State Park =

- IUCN category III (natural monument or feature)
- Location within Victoria
- Location: Victoria
- Nearest city: Shepparton
- Coordinates: 36°07′51″S 145°33′57″E
- Area: 10.30 km^{2} (3.98 sq mi)
- Established: 2002
- Governing body: Parks Victoria
- Website: http://parkweb.vic.gov.au/explore/parks/broken-boosey-state-park

Broken-Boosey State Park is a linear corridor along sections of Nine Mile Creek, Boosey Creek, and Broken Creek, between Shepparton and Tocumwal, in Victoria's north. It covers 1,030 hectares (4.0 mi^{2}), and was declared in 2002. It protects some of the few remaining stands of native vegetation in this part of Victoria, including threatened species such as coolibah grass, spiny-fruit saltbush and pepper grass.
