= Horseshoe Bend Farm =

City farm in Melbourne, Victoria, Australia

Coordinates: 37.7290°S 144.8448°E

Horseshoe Bend Farm is a 26 hectares (0.10 mi^{2}) park in Keilor, a western suburbs of Melbourne, Australia, adjacent to Brimbank Park on the Maribyrnong River. Formerly a commercial farm, an original 1930s weatherboard cottage, stables and outbuildings still exist on the site.

The area that is now the park was a public reserve for grazing travelling livestock until it was subdivided between 1954 and 1900. It was operated as a dairy farm by William O'Neil Jnr, until his death in the 1930s, when it was sold off with smaller lots used for orchards and market gardens. It later operated as a children's farm, before closing in 2010.

After being closed to the public, Parks Victoria took over management of the former farm, after no interested parties were found to take on the lease. This prompted calls from the community for it to be reopened as a public park. Parks Victoria announced that it would maintain the farm as a park and open it to pedestrian access in October 2016. The park is open 24 hours and dogs are permitted.
