= Sweeneys Flats =

Coordinates: 37.7346°S 145.1584°E

Sweeneys Flats is a metropolitan park in Melbourne, Australia. It is located in the eastern suburb of Eltham. It is managed by Parks Victoria. Fauna include the swamp wallaby, sugar gliders and wetland birds such as egrets and herons.

== Sources ==
- http://www.parkweb.vic.gov.au/1park_display.cfm?park=192
- http://www.about-australia.com/travel-guides/victoria/yarra-valley-dandenongs/attractions/natural/sweeneys-flat/
