= Banksia Park (Victoria) =

Park in Melbourne, Australia

- Interactive map of Banksia Park
- Type: Metropolitan Park
- Location: Heidelberg, Victoria, Australia
- Coordinates: 37°45′33″S 145°04′57″E
- Area: 23 hectares (57 acres)
- Operator: Parks Victoria
- Open: Pedestrian and cyclist access at all times. Vehicle entry 6am to 6pm, 9pm during daylight saving time

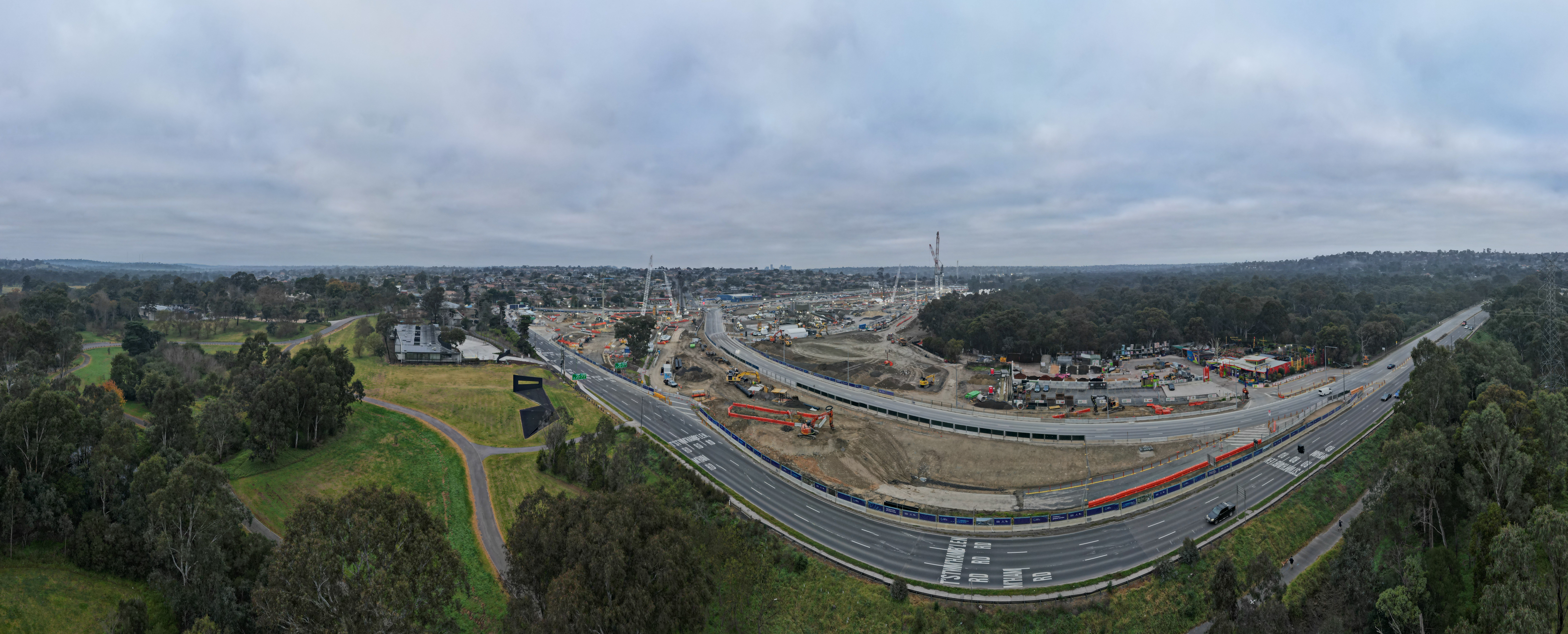
Northeast Link under construction next to Banksia Park. July 2024.

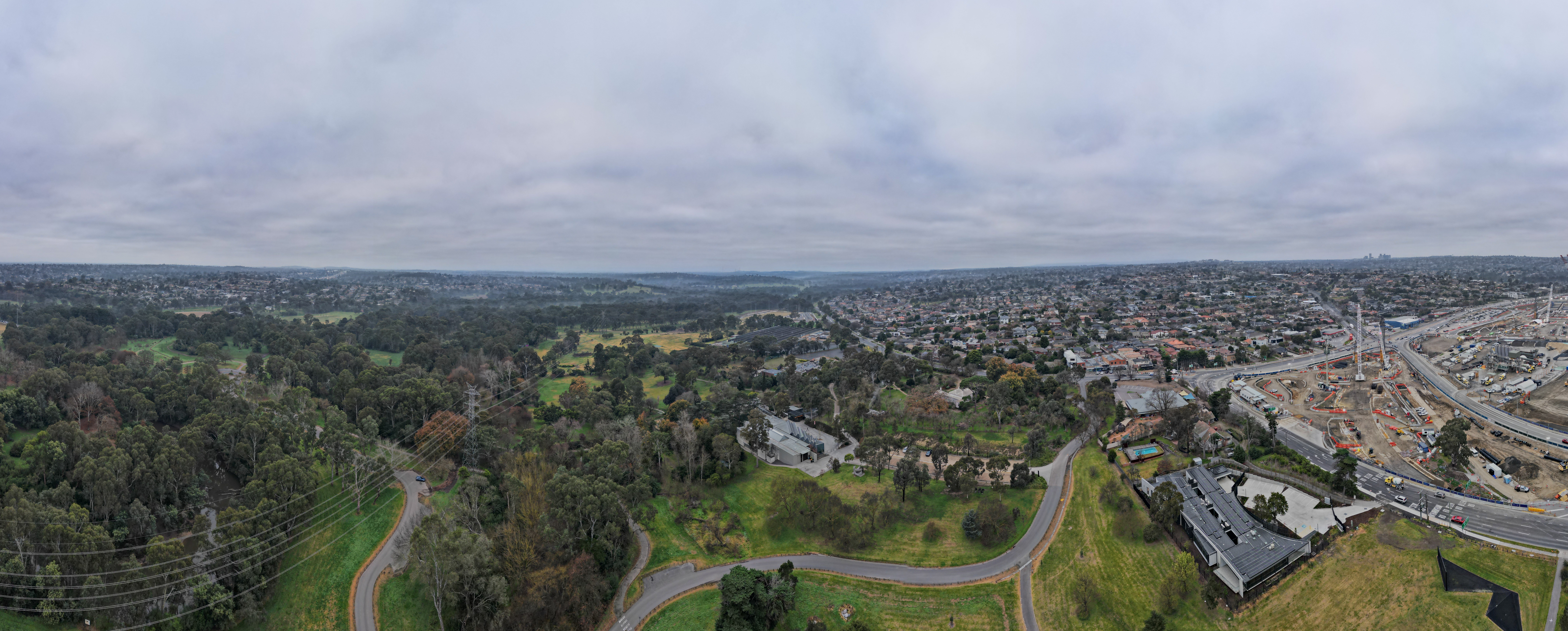
Banksia Park and the Heidelberg Museum from above. July 2024.

Banksia Park is a park on the banks of the Yarra River in Heidelberg, a north-eastern suburb of Melbourne. It has wood barbecues, picnic shelter, playground, and a toilet block.
