= Bushy Park Wetlands =

Wetlands and park in Melbourne, Victoria, Australia

Coordinates: 37.869°S 145.191°E

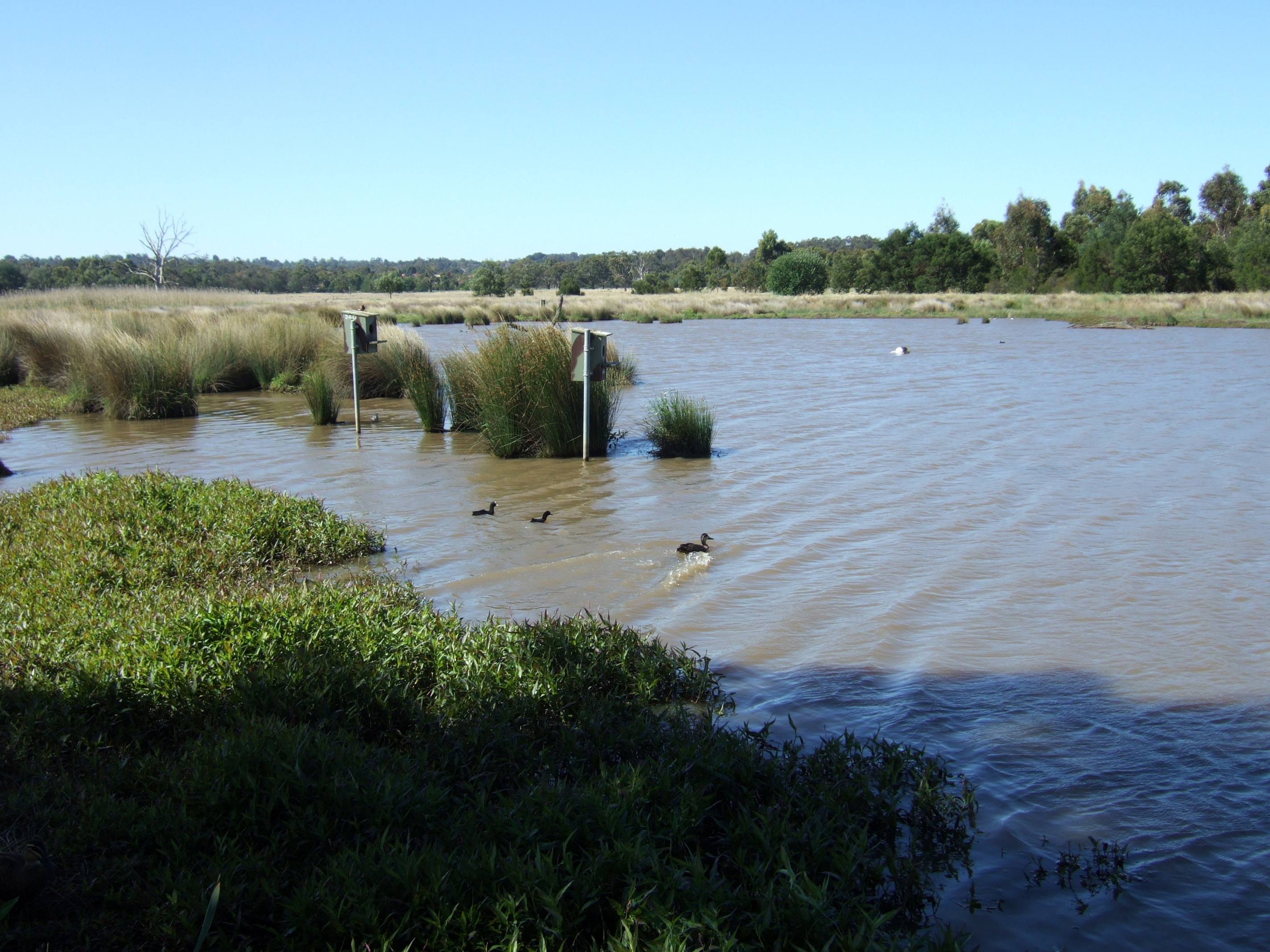
Wildlife at a permanent water source in Bushy Park Wetlands.

Bushy Park Wetlands is a 30-hectare (74-acre) conservation park in Glen Waverley, Victoria, Australia. On the edge of suburbia, it is bounded by Dandenong Creek and houses along King Arthur Drive and Knights Drive. There is a cycling and walking path, and a bird watching hide, where egrets, pelicans, coots, dusky moorhen, ibis and occasionally spoonbill can be observed. It is accessible from the end of Highbury Road, or at the Drummies Bridge Reserve off High Street Road. It is also connected by the Dandenong Creek Trail to Shepherds Bush Park, Koomba Park and Napier Park.

== History ==
The name "Bushy Park" dates from the 1840s, when it was used for grazing cattle, but has referred to various locations in the vicinity, including what is now Jells Park.

In recent years, the wetlands is managed by Parks Victoria with assistance from a local community group, Friends of Bushy Park Wetlands. It forms part of the Dandenong Valley Parklands. Cattle continue to graze the area, to keep the grass short and to "preserve the rural heritage" of the site.

== See also ==
- City of Monash History

== Sources ==
- https://web.archive.org/web/20070927041013/http://www.about-australia.com/travel-guides/victoria/melbourne/attractions/natural/bushy-park-wetlands/
- Friends of Bushy Park Wetlands
- https://web.archive.org/web/20060914072027/http://www.totaltravel.com.au/travel/vic/melbournearea/easternsuburbsmelbourne/guide/bushy-park-wetlands
- https://web.archive.org/web/20060827023644/http://monash.vic.gov.au/maps/reserves/res_area32.htm - map.
