= Great South West Walk =

Australian walking track

Coordinates: 37°59′S 140°58′E

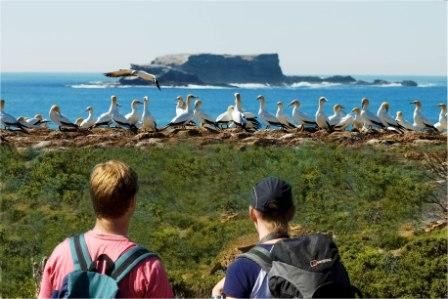
- Length: 251 km (156 mi)
- Location: Western District, Victoria; Limestone Coast, South Australia
- Established: 1981
- Trailheads: Portland; Nelson
- Use: Hiking
- Difficulty: Moderate
- Website: http://www.greatsouthwestwalk.com

The Great South West Walk is a 251-kilometre (156 mi)/ 262-kilometer (163mi) walking track, established in 1981, located in South West Victoria, Australia. The track passes through the Lower Glenelg National Park, the Cobboboonee National Park, the Discovery Bay Coastal Park, the Mount Richmond National Park and the Cape Nelson State Park, and may be explored through shorter or overnight hikes, or the entire 12- to 14-day circular hike, starting and finishing in either Portland or Nelson. A short portion of the track is located with the Lower Glenelg River Conservation Park in South Australia, near Donovans.

The track is administered, maintained and promoted by The Friends of the Great South West Walk Inc., a volunteer organisation, in partnership with Parks Victoria.

== Track ==
The Great South West Walk track, which notionally begins and ends at the Visitor Information Centre in Portland, traverses forest, river gorge, high cliff tops and bays. It was designed as a long-distance walking track, with the option for short and day walks. It is accessed from roads in and near the towns of Portland and Nelson. The walk's difficulty is rated as moderate, and consists of fifteen sections of varying lengths. The walk contains 14 camp sites along the track; all supplied with fresh water, cleared tent sites and bush toilets. All overnight stays at 14 campsites require an online booking and a fee. Links to the online booking site can be accessed via the walk's website: www.greatsouthwestwalk.com

The entire length of the circuit is 251-kilometers if you proceed direct along the beach from Swan Lake Camp, or 262-kilometers (and an extra day) if you head inland from Swan Lake Camp to Tarragal Camp. After Tarragal Camp the inland route returns to the coast near the Bridgewater Lakes.

Part of the track follows the course of the Glenelg River, with other parts located adjacent to the Southern Ocean.

=== Sections ===
The track consists of the following sections and points:

Sections and trackheads of the Great South West Walk
Section location	Start location	End location	Section distance	
Section location	Start location	End location	km	mile
rural fringe	Portland	Cubbys Camp	18.5	11.5
Cobboboonee National Park	Cubbys Camp	Cut-Out Camp	13	8.1
Cobboboonee National Park	Cut-Out Camp	Fitzroy Camp	22	14
Lower Glenelg National Park	Fitzroy Camp	Moleside Camp	22	14
Lower Glenelg National Park	Moleside Camp	Pritchards Camp	10.5	6.5
Lower Glenelg National Park	Pritchards Camp	Pattersons Camp	21.5	13.4
Lower Glenelg National Park	Pattersons Camp	Nelson	19	12
Discovery Day Coastal Park	Nelson	Monibeong	23	14
Discovery Day Coastal Park	Monibeong	Swan Lake	16	9.9
Mount Richmond National Park	Swan Lake	Tarragal Camp	20	12
Mount Richmond National Park	Tarragal Camp	Springs Camp	12	7.5
Cape Bridgewater	Springs Camp	Trewalla Camp	15	9.3
Cape Nelson State Park	Trewalla Camp	Mallee Camp	17	11
Cape Nelson State Park	Mallee Camp	Portland	17	11

== See also ==
- Great Ocean Walk
- List of long-distance hiking tracks in Australia
