= Lower Glenelg National Park =

National park in Victoria, Australia

- IUCN category II (national park)
- Location within Victoria
- Location: Victoria
- Nearest city: Nelson
- Coordinates: 38°03′58″S 141°17′19″E
- Area: 273 km^{2} (105 sq mi)
- Established: 1969
- Visitors: 200,000 (in 1991)
- Governing body: Parks Victoria
- Website: Official website

Ramsar Wetland
- Official name: Glenelg Estuary and Discovery Bay Ramsar Site
- Designated: 28 February 2018
- Reference no.: 2344

The Lower Glenelg National Park is a national park in the Western District of Victoria, Australia. The 27,300-hectare (67,000-acre) national park is situated approximately 323 kilometres (201 mi) west of Melbourne. The major features of the park are the Glenelg River gorge and the Princess Margaret Rose Cave. Much of the route of the Great South West Walk is located within the national park.

The park abuts the Cobboboonee National Park in the east and the Lower Glenelg River Conservation Park across the border with South Australia in the west. To the south lies the Discovery Bay Coastal Park which is adjacent to the Southern Ocean.

Land within the national park, the Discovery Bay Coastal Park and the Nelson Streamside Reserve was listed as a Ramsar site known as the Glenelg Estuary and Discovery Bay Ramsar Site on 28 February 2018.

== See also ==
- Protected areas of Victoria
- Kurrawonga Reserve
- List of national parks of Australia
