= Mount Richmond National Park =

National park in Australia

- IUCN category II (national park)
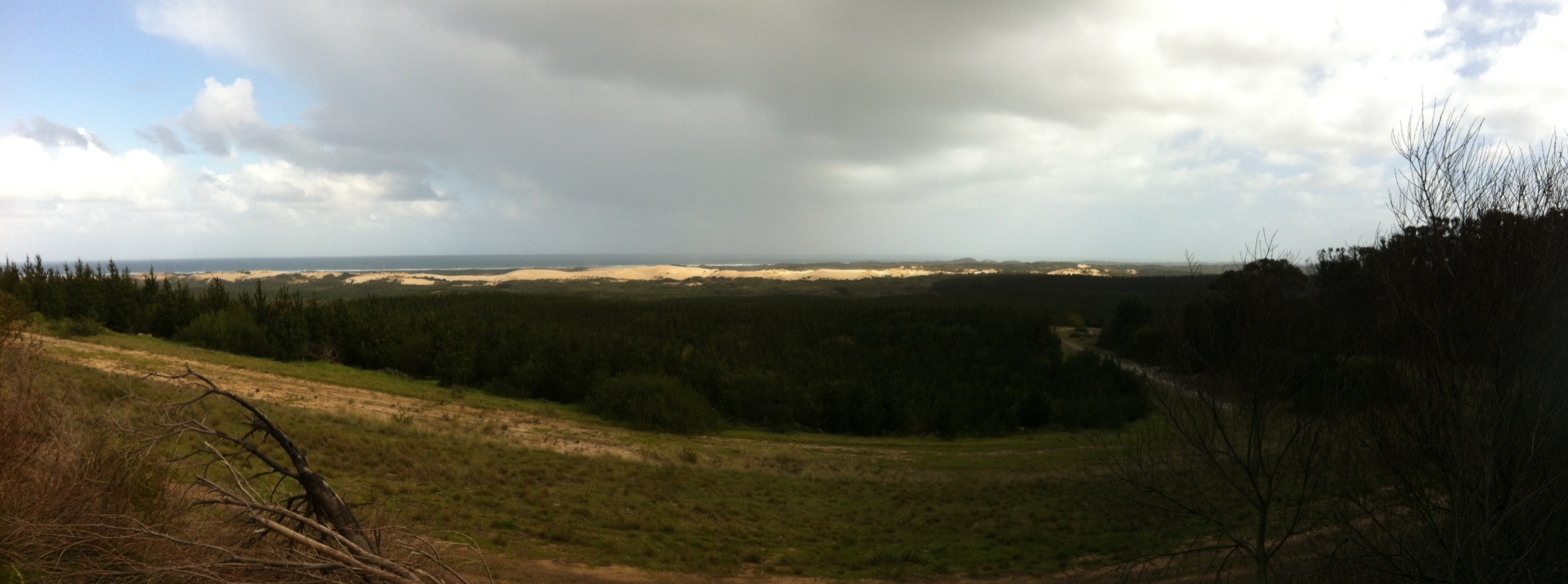

- Location within Victoria
- Location: Victoria
- Nearest city: Portland
- Coordinates: 38°16′13″S 141°25′29″E
- Area: 17.33 km^{2} (6.69 sq mi)
- Established: 7 June 1960
- Governing body: Parks Victoria
- Website: Official website

The Mount Richmond National Park is a national park located in the Barwon South West region of Victoria, Australia. The 1,733-hectare (4,280-acre) national park is situated approximately 313 kilometres (194 mi) west of Melbourne and 18 kilometres (11 mi) west of Portland. Part of the route of the Great South West Walk is located within the park.

== See also ==
- Great South West Walk
- Protected areas of Victoria
- List of national parks of Australia
