= Mount Samaria State Park =

- IUCN category II (national park)
- Location within Victoria
- Location: Victoria
- Nearest city: Mansfield
- Coordinates: 36.8876°S 146.0657°E
- Area: 76 km^{2} (29 sq mi)
- Established: 1979
- Governing body: Parks Victoria
- Website: Official website

Mount Samaria State Park is a 7,600-hectare (19,000-acre) park situated approximately 20 km north of Mansfield in the state of Victoria, Australia. The park is bounded on the western side by the Broken River and Lake Nillahcootie.

== See also ==
- Protected areas of Victoria
