= Lead (geology) =

Subsurface structural or stratigraphic feature

A lead in hydrocarbon exploration, is a subsurface structural or stratigraphic feature with the potential to have entrapped oil or natural gas. When exploring a new area, or when new data becomes available in existing acreage, an explorer will carry out an initial screening to identify possible leads. Further work is then concentrated on the leads with the intention to mature at least some of them into drillable prospects.
