= Ecological vegetation class =

Vegetation classification system developed by the state of Victoria, Australia

An ecological vegetation class (EVC) is a component of the vegetation classification system developed and used by the state of Victoria, Australia, since 1994, for mapping floristic biodiversity. Ecological vegetation classes are groupings of vegetation communities based on floristic, structural, and ecological features. The Victorian Department of Environment, Land, Water and Planning has defined all of the EVCs within Victoria.

An EVC consists of one or a number of floristic communities that appear to be associated with a recognisable ecological niche, and which can be characterised by a number of their adaptive responses to ecological processes that operate at the landscape scale. Each ecological vegetation class is described through a combination of its floristic, life-form, and reproductive strategy profiles, and through an inferred fidelity to particular environmental attributes.

Although there are more than 300 individual EVCs, some can be grouped together to form a bioregion, which is a geographical approach to classifying the environment using climate, geomorphology, geology, soils and vegetation. There are 28 bioregions across Victoria. Each EVC within a bioregion can be assigned a conservation status, to indicate its degree of alteration since European settlement in Australia. To assist with the assessment of an EVC within a bioregion, benchmarks have been established to ensure that assessments are carried out in a standard fashion across Victoria.

== Development ==
Ecological vegetation classes developed from earlier approaches to the mapping of floristic communities. An example in Victoria of such earlier mapping was that done for the Otway Forest Management Area by Brinkman and Farell in 1990. This represented a break from previous floristic mapping, which was based on structural vegetation units, which in turn were derived from assessing height, density and species composition of the canopy. A "structural vegetation unit" approach had been used for the Land Conservation Council (LCC) Study Area vegetation mapping in Victoria in the 1970s (see e.g. LCC 1976).

The first implementation of EVCs was by Woodgate et al. (1994) for mapping of East Gippsland old growth forests, under the Victorian Department of Natural Resources and Environment. In actuality, two mapping exercises were undertaken. One was for "extant EVCs" showing vegetation at the time of mapping (i.e. the 1990s), and the other "pre-1750 EVCs", which mapped an expert interpretation of the vegetation classes as they would have been prior to European impact, taken nominally as the year 1750. In 1996 an expert scientific group was established to undertake a peer review of the EVC methodology, concluding that "EVCs provide an important statewide level of vegetation mapping and that EVCs are an appropriate basis for assessing floristic biodiversity conservation".

Ecological vegetation class mapping was implemented under the Comprehensive Regional Assessment reporting for the five Regional Forest Agreements (RFAs) that were underway in Victoria in the late 1990s. For an example of this mapping, see the Comprehensive Regional Assessment and the Biodiversity Assessment Report for the West Victorian Regional Forest Agreement, and in particular for this example see Map 2: Extant Ecological Vegetation Classes and Map 3: Ecological Vegetation Classes - Pre-1750 Extant, for the western part of the West Victorian RFA area. Through the RFA process and subsequent mapping projects in the non-productive forest regions of the state, the whole of the state of Victoria was mapped with EVCs at 1:100,000 scale.

== Implementation ==
=== Applications ===
Ecological vegetation class mapping has become an important tool for biodiversity planning and management in the State of Victoria. The mapping itself has been released to the public in a number of formats. The Department of Environment, Land, Water and Planning provides an interactive map called NatureKit which allows users to display a number of vegetation themes for any area of Victoria, including ecological vegetation classes (EVCs), pre-1750 EVCs, broad EVC groups, and the bioregional conservation status of EVCs. The department has an information sheet Overview of native vegetation spatial datasets explaining the EVC spatial data products. The Victorian government has publicly released the EVC spatial datasets in various GIS vector data formats on the Victorian Government Data Directory under a Creative Commons licence.

=== Conservation status ===
Combining the conservation status of an EVC and its bioregion can be used to determine the overall bioregional conservation status of a particular EVC. This provides a means to compare the present extent and quality of an EVC to its pre-1750 conditions. There are six statuses, as defined by the Victorian Government:

- Presumed extinct (X)
- Endangered (E)
- Vulnerable (V)
- Depleted (D)
- Rare (R)
- Least concern (LC)

== See also ==
- Phytochorion
