= Snape Reserve =

Nature reserve in western Victoria, Australia

Coordinates: 36.452611°S 141.983694°E

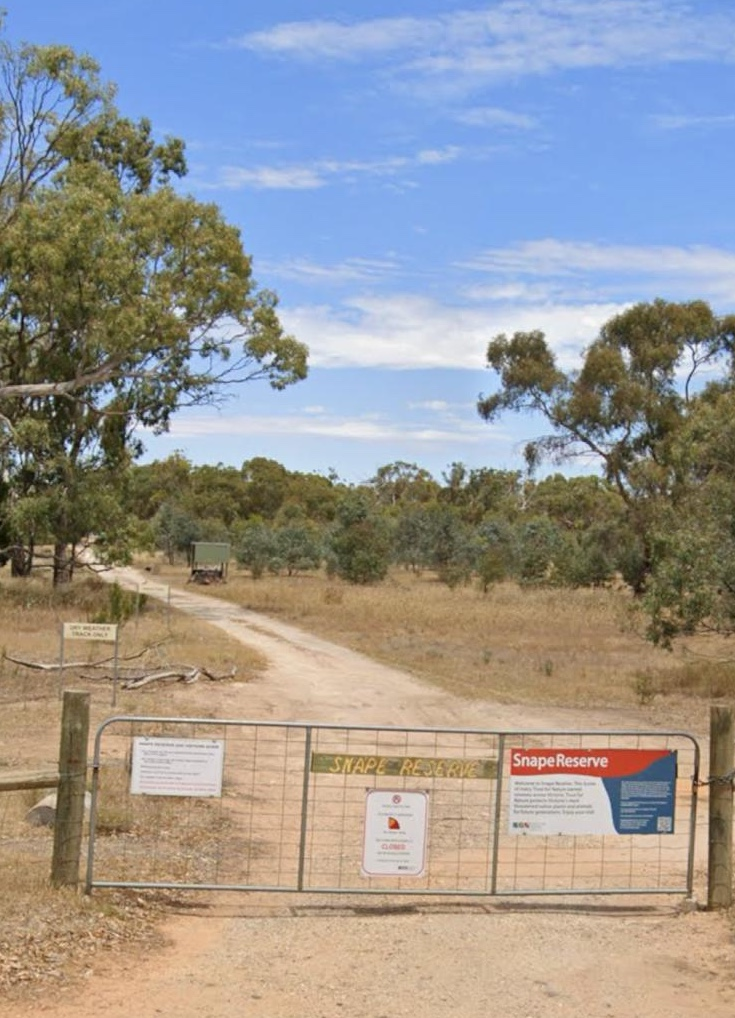
Snape Reserve main gate

Snape Reserve is a 750-hectare private conservation property managed by Trust for Nature in western Victoria, Australia. It is located near the town of Dimboola and borders the Little Desert National Park.

== History ==
The property was previously used for agricultural purposes. The reserve was purchased in 2002 and named in honour of Brian and Diana Snape, the former of whom served as Chairman of Trust for Nature for a decade.

Brian oversaw the organisation during its early development and was also involved in the adoption of the name Trust for Nature in 1985.

Following its acquisition by Trust for Nature, the land was destocked, and natural regeneration commenced across much of the landscape. Supplementary revegetation efforts have also been undertaken in certain areas to support native plant recovery and biodiversity enhancement.

== Ecology ==
Snape Reserve is notable for its exceptional ecological diversity, supporting at least 12 distinct Ecological Vegetation Classes (EVCs)—a number significantly higher than the three EVCs present in the adjoining area of Little Desert National Park. The EVCs identified at the reserve include:

- Cypress-pine Woodland
- Black Box Woodland
- Northern Plains Grassy Woodland
- Red Gum Woodland
- Herb-rich Woodland
- Stringybark Heathy Woodland
- Banksia Heath
- Mallee Woodland
- Willow Wattle Rises

Ephemeral swamps

Visitors to the reserve can observe subtle changes in soil composition that help define transitions between vegetation communities, including areas rich in gypsum and ephemeral wetland features.

Snape Reserve hosts a wide range of native bird species, attracting interest from field naturalists and birdwatchers. Commonly observed birds include:

- Mistletoe bird (Dicaeum hirundinaceum)
- Hooded robin (Melanodryas cucullata)
- Rainbow bee-eater (Merops ornatus)
- Eastern rosella (Platycercus eximius)
- Diamond firetail (Stagonopleura guttata)

A highlight for many visitors is the Southern Scrub-robin (Drymodes brunneopygia), a species typically difficult to observe in other regions.

Snape Reserve provides valuable habitat for the endangered south-eastern red-tailed black cockatoo. Through biodiversity response planning, Greening Australia is working to establish 30,000 stringybark trees across 500 hectares – an important food source for the red-tailed black cockatoo.

The invertebrate population is also of ecological interest. Jewel beetles have been recorded among the heath tea-tree (Leptospermum myrtifolium), and complex ant behaviours have been documented, including nest construction with high earthen mounds and the apparent collection of Guinea-flower petals and grass seeds.

Mistletoe and buloke

The parasitic mistletoe observed growing on buloke trees (Allocasuarina luehmannii) blends seamlessly with the host's drooping branchlets. The mistletoe can be distinguished by its erect cylindrical leaves and a visible lump at the point of attachment.

== Conservation significance ==
The high number of EVCs and the presence of rare or threatened species highlight Snape Reserve as a conservation hotspot. Ongoing management by Trust for Nature and naturalist groups aims to preserve and study the site's biodiversity.
