= Floristic diversity =

Term for biodiversity in plants

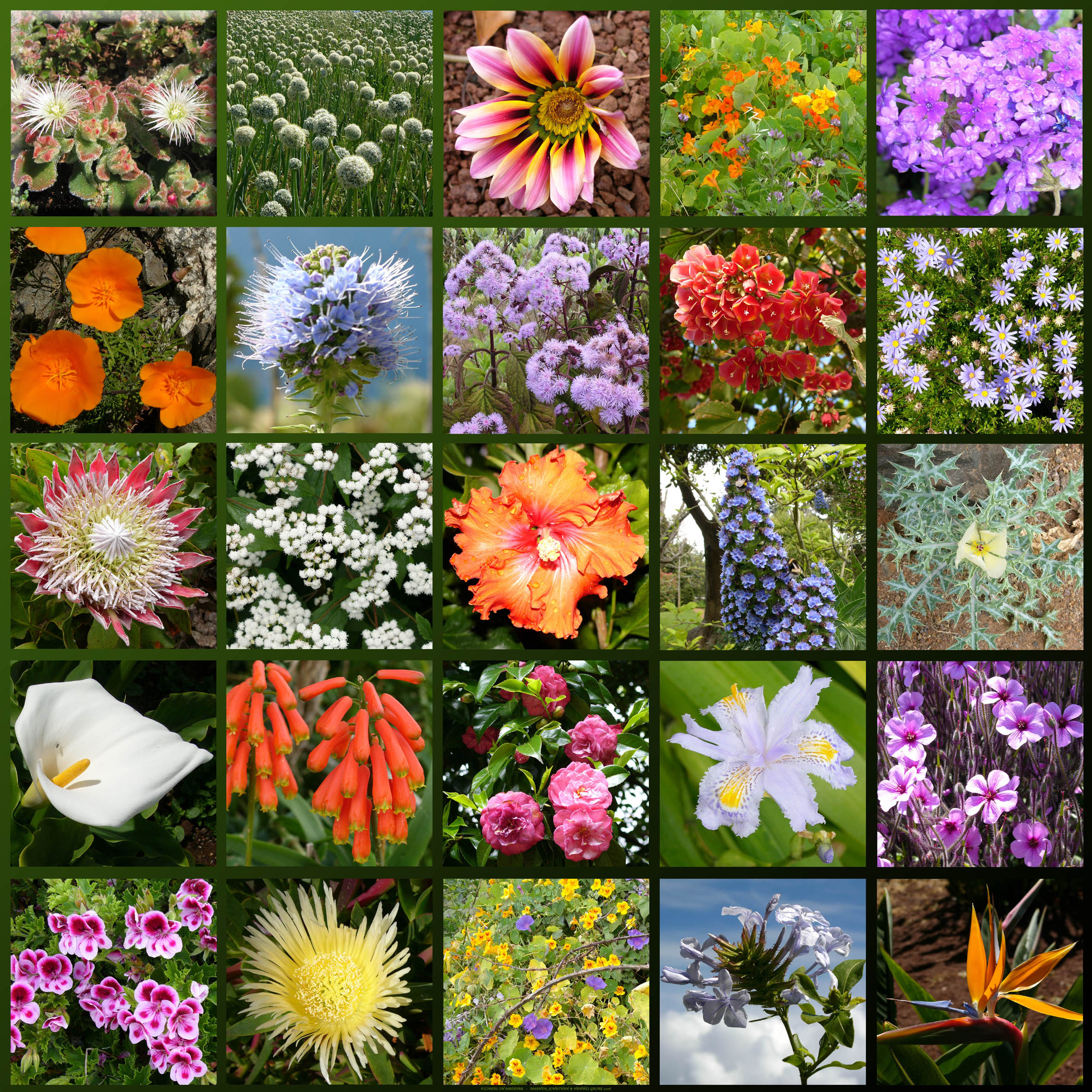
Floristic diversity within flowers

Floristic diversity is variety in the genome of flowering plants, as well as variety at the species and ecosystem level. Floristic diversity covers how many varieties of plant species in a specific area there are. There are multiple factors that contribute to floristic diversity, including both biotic (living) and abiotic (not living) elements. Elements that alter floristic diversity include climate, weather, soil, and animals. Floristic diversity allows different regions to analyze the environment and the evolution of the area.

The genome of plants can be different based on size, number of chromosomes, and order of genes. Analyzing genomes in plants helps scientists to determine differences and similarities within plant species.

== Etymology ==
In the word floristic, "flora" means "flower" in Latin. Floristic is used to describe something relating plants or flowers, not to be confused with the word: Floristics.

In the word diversity, the Latin root "diversus" means "various." Diversity is used to describe variety or a range of differences.

== Floristic diversity in Latin America ==
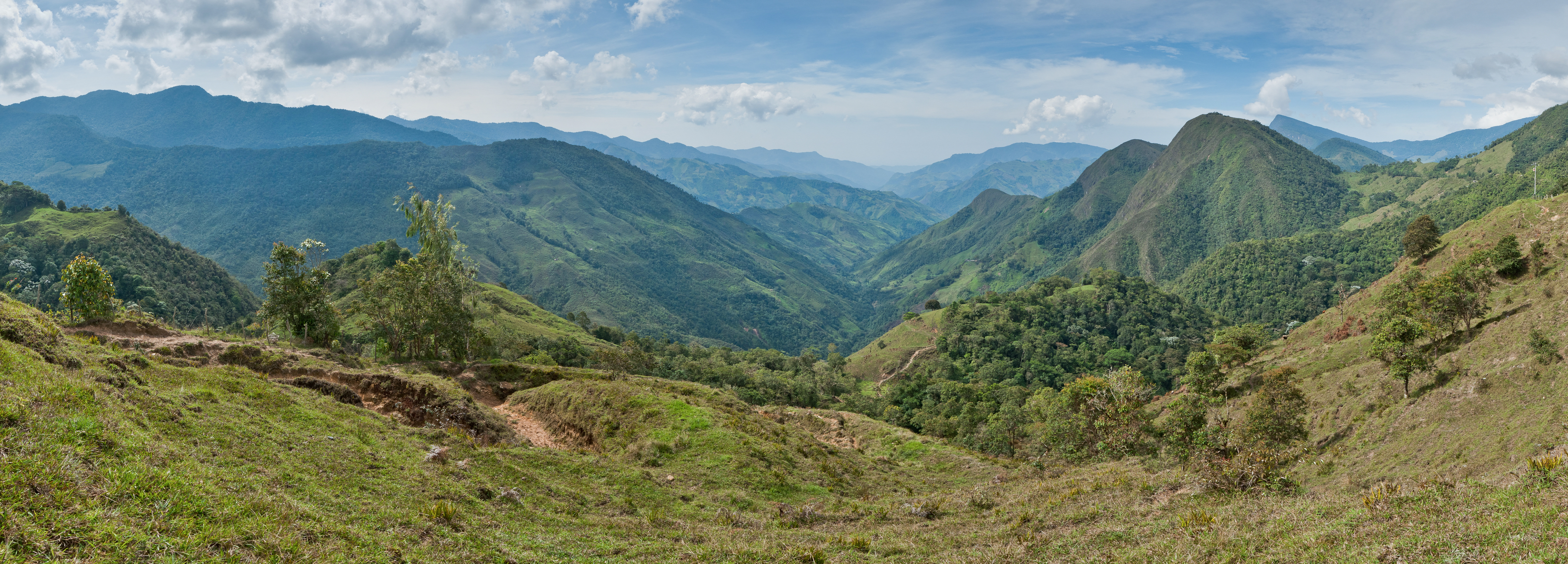
Andes Mountains, known for having floristic diversity.

One region in Latin America with one of the largest amount of floristic diversity in plants is the Andes Mountains Tropical Hotspot, known for being biodiverse and having one-sixth of the worlds plant species residing there. By having a wide variety in climate such as having multiple elevations, many types of ecosystems, and temperature differences, this mountain strip has the ability to host multiple types of plants.
