= Oriental Claims =

Coordinates: 37.107°S 147.576°E

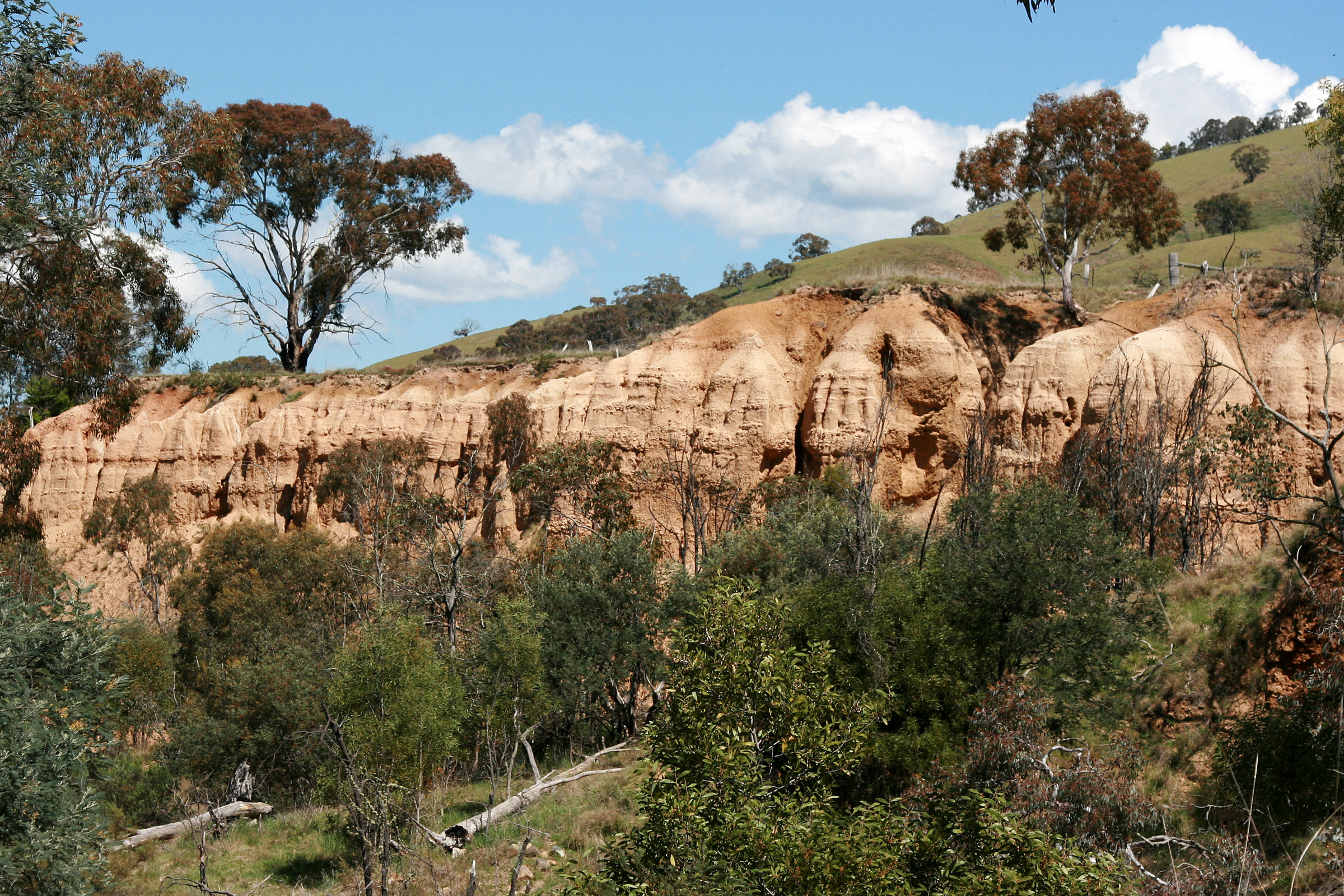
The Oriental Claim was mined between 1876-1904. Man-made cliffs up to 30m high such as seen here are found throughout the Oriental Claims Historic Area

The Oriental Claims are a former gold mining operation, or claim, located 2 km south of Omeo, Victoria, Australia. The Oriental Claims are named in reference to The Oriental Company which mined in the area from 1876 to 1904, and also in memory of the many Chinese miners ('Orientals') that worked the area for over 50 years.

During the main years of operation it is estimated that 58,000 ounces (1,600 kg) of gold was extracted from the area, which would equate to over A$75 million at the 2010 gold price of over A$1,300 an ounce. The Oriental Claims are currently preserved as a Parks Victoria Historic Area covering about 202 hectares (500 acres).

== History ==
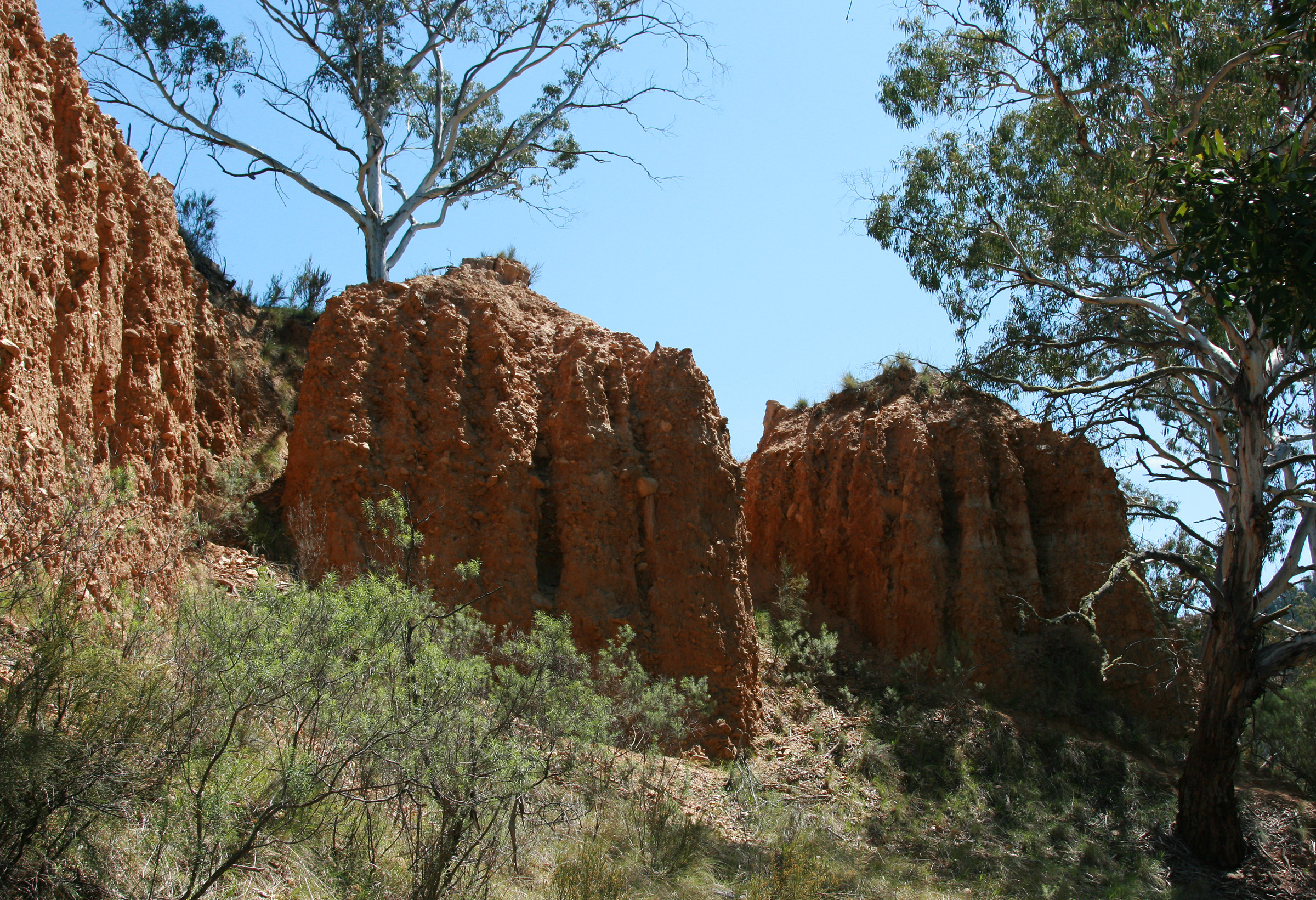
The Oriental Company used hydraulic sluicing through the land, resulting in these cliffs

=== The Oriental Company ===
Contrary to the popular belief due to its name that it was an oriental (Asian) company, The Oriental Company was a European company that mined the area from 1876 to 1904, chiefly working its Oriental Claim. It was established by five shareholders and altogether the company leased two areas containing 43 hectares and rightfully owned another 25 hectares of prime mining land.

The company used hydraulic sluicing to carve the land for alluvial gold and gouged the land with a network of water races specifically designed for maximum water pressure. However, towards the last years of the company's operations disputes occurred between shareholders. Mining was eventually halted in 1904 due to environmental issues around the state of the Livingstone Creek and the Oriental Company went out of business. A solution was found in 1911 involving placing the mining waste or tailings on already worked ground and a new Oriental Company took up the claim, but this proved unprofitable and all mining pursuits essentially stopped in the Oriental Claims area by 1912.

=== Other miners ===
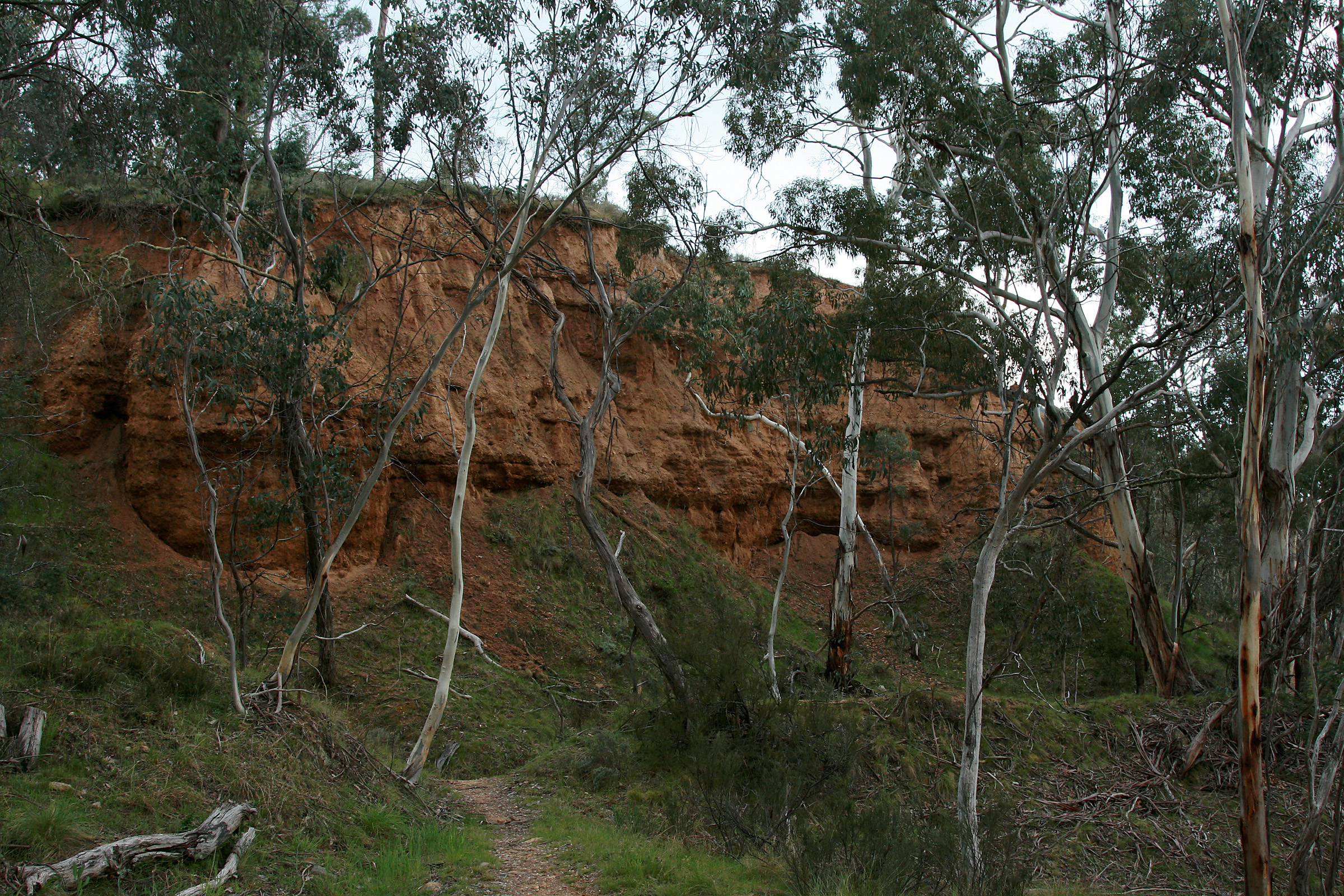
The Starlight Claim on Ah Fong's loop walk

Prior to 1876 when the Oriental Company started to mine the claims the area was first mined by early squatters and then soon after it was mined by small companies. One of the more established was the Pioneer Company who worked the Pioneer Claim for 25 years from 1856-1881, before selling to the Chinese Co-operative who continued mining the claim with relatively little success until 1888. This company was composed of no more than fifty men, and they were some of the first miners to use sluicing in the claims, creating water races and hydraulic systems to accommodate the hydraulic sluicing methods. Other companies also invested interest in the area at this time as did a number of individual miners.

Chinese miners also made the best of the promised gold at the claims. Ah Fong and his small group of about four miners proved the most successful of the Asian miners and managed to extract 6,000 ounces (170 kg) of gold from their small claim between 1875 and 1883. Currently there is a loop track that views Ah Fong's Claim, and there is still evidence of the hydraulic system used to remove the gold.

=== Criminal activity ===
As a result of the gold rush there were plenty of criminals eager to rob a miner of his hard earned gold. The few troopers assigned to the area were too busy settling mining disputes and enforcing permits that crimes outside the claims were neglected. Murderers, con men and women and professional gamblers all utilized the gold rush to their own ends. However these criminals were a minority in the Omeo district, the majority of the people being hardworking miners. Magistrates were brought into the area to help minimize crime. One of the magistrates Mr. Brown is said to have described Omeo as the roughest and toughest goldfield in Australia as recorded in A.M Pearson’s historical recording ‘Echoes From The Mountains’.

== Local area ==
=== Aboriginal heritage ===
Before the European settlement of the Omeo district it was inhabited by an Aboriginal clan numbering at approximately two hundred and fifty. There is little reported of these people in the years that the district was settled, although it is said that they were somewhat territorial and could be violent towards neighbouring tribes. However they had an alliance with the Bongillo clan who occupied the Wodonga district. The two tribes met annually to engage wives to the young men of the tribe at the Bogong High Plains. Here they also indulged in the bogong moths that hatched at the High Plains in great number which served as a delicacy in their diets. The environment was changed massively with the settlement of Europeans and the introduction of pests such as rabbits. The competition and danger associated with European settlement drove the Omeo tribe practically to extinction. The last known survivor was employed as a stockman on Bindi station, south of Omeo. It is not known whether there are any present descendants.

=== Settlement ===
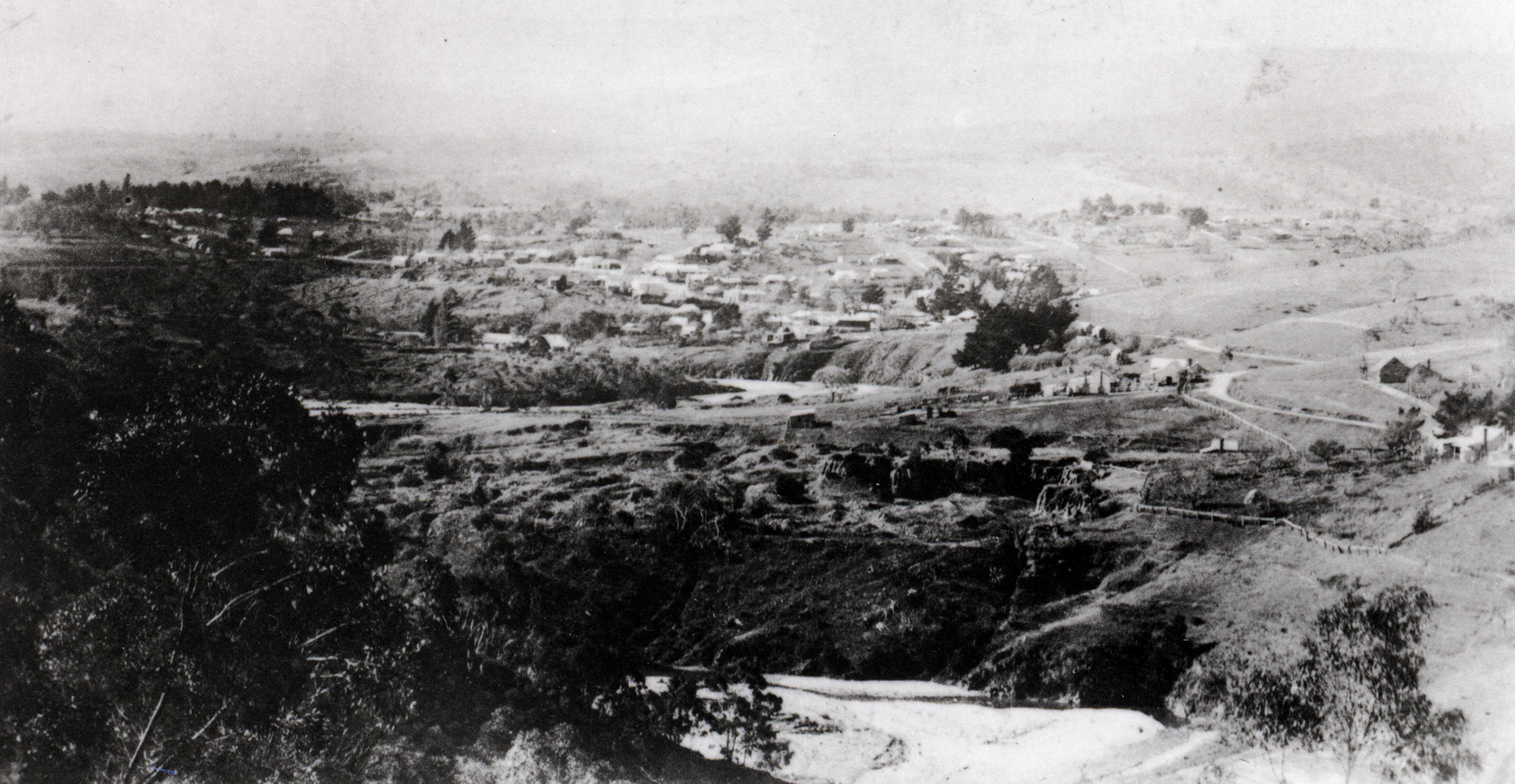
View of Omeo from the Oriental Claims c1890s showing the significant silting of Livingstone Creek; this view today is largely obscured by vegetation

The first stations were founded in Omeo in December 1835. The area was originally settled by Livingstone. Livingstone Creek and Mount Livingstone were named after the first squatter in the area.

=== Omeo ===
Omeo when translated means mountains. This is relevant for the area that forms Omeo is surrounded by mountains. During the peak of the gold rush the town accommodated thousands of miners, farmers and businessmen however in 2006 statistics showed that it had a population of 452. This population decline was mainly due to the end of the gold rush but was also affected by the depression in the 1930s and the 1939 fires that claimed half the town, remarkably only killing two people.

=== Local area ===
During the gold rush period, gold was found throughout the surrounding district and it supported many small communities clustered around the gold strikes. These included Cassilis, Riley’s Creek, Brookville, Stirling, New Rush, Swifts Creek, Bald Hill Creek, The Gibbo, Wombat, Brandy Creek, The Big River, Cribbage Creek, Swindlers Creek and other small rivers that served as an attraction for eager miners. Today most of these areas are practically deserted with few houses or farming, however Swifts Creek still supports 281 residents and a number of small businesses and government agencies.
