= Dexter's Bush =

Nature reserve in Heathmont

Coordinates: 37°50′12″S 145°14′56″E

Dexter’s Bush, is a 1.5-hectare bushland reserve in Heathmont, a suburb of Maroondah, Victoria, Australia. It is managed by Maroondah City Council, having previously been entrusted to Trust for Nature. The reserve originated from land donated by local conservationists Mick and Liz Dexter, whose long-term stewardship preserved and restored the site’s ecological value.

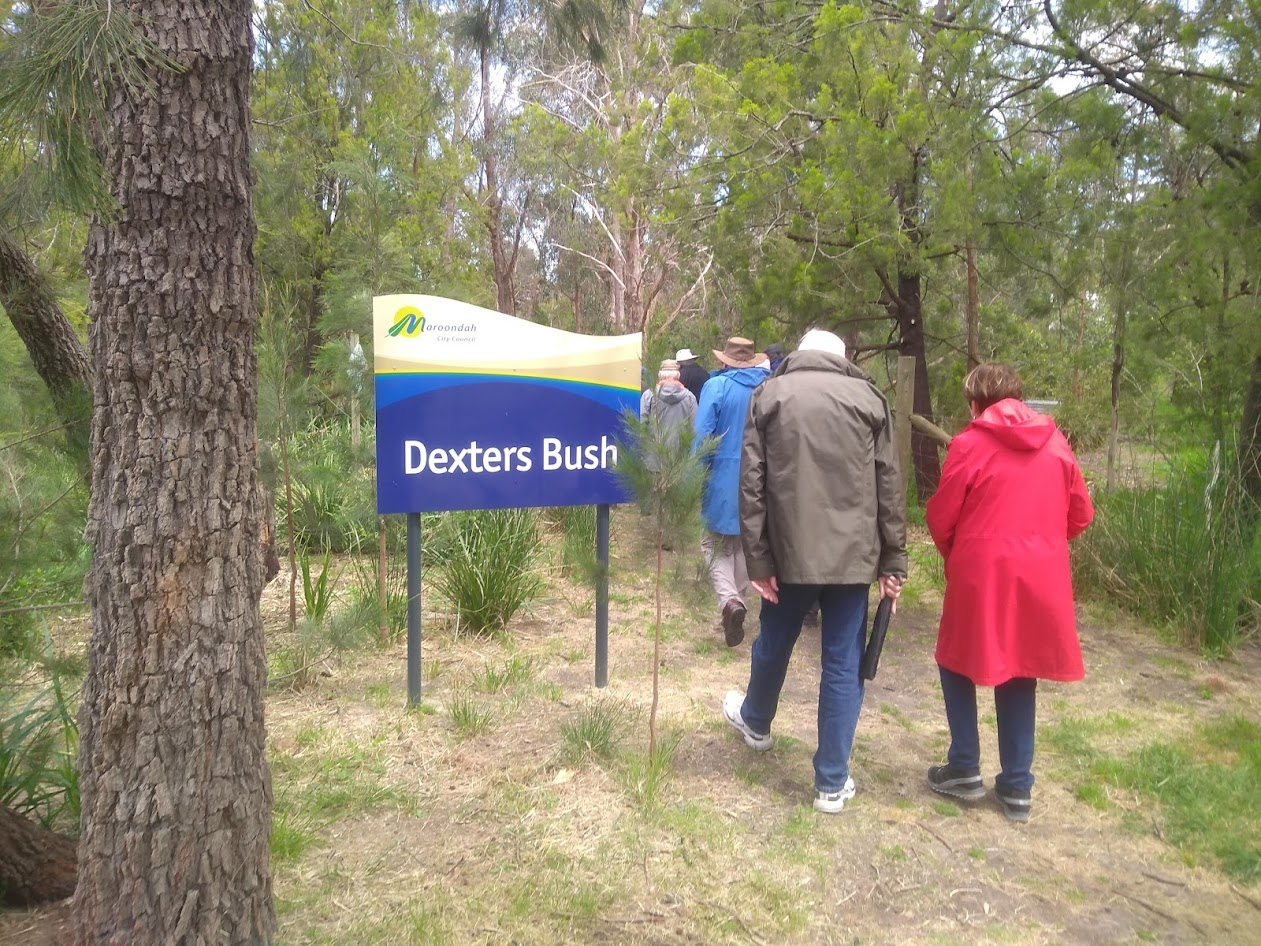
Bushwalkers passing the Dexters Bush sign

== History ==
Mick and Liz Dexter purchased the original 2-hectare property at 46 Dickasons Road, Heathmont, in 1956. Initially consisting of grasses, rushes, and blackberries, the property also featured a pine plantation and remnant native bushland along Dandenong Creek. In 1988, the Dexters donated 1 hectare—including the pine plantation—to the Victorian Conservation Trust (now Trust for Nature).

In 1990, 88 pine trees were removed, a process that cleared the way for natural regeneration. Remarkably, disturbance triggered a revival of native species from the seed bank, including Bush Pea, Coral Heath (Epacris gunnii), and Tufted Blue Lily (Thelionema caespitosum). A further 1.5 hectares along Dandenong Creek were later added, bringing the reserve’s total area to approximately 1.5 hectares as managed today by Maroondah Council.

The land was officially transferred to the council in 2015, after the Dexters were no longer able to manage it by themselves.

== Vegetation ==
Dexter’s Bush supports a diverse range of native plant species and remnant wet heathy woodland communities. Notable flora includes:

- Silver-leaf Stringybark (Eucalyptus cephalocarpa)
- Cherry Ballart (Exocarpos cupressiformis)
- Silver Banksia (Banksia marginata)
- Common Heath (Epacris impressa)
- Tufted Blue Lily (Thelionema caespitosum)
- Red-fruited Saw-sedge (Gahnia sieberiana)
- Triggerplants (Stylidium spp.)
- Bulbine Lily (Bulbine bulbosa)

Several species once lost due to drought, such as Coral Heath, were propagated by the Community of Ringwood Indigenous Species Plant Nursery from cuttings taken from the reserve and successfully reintroduced.

Dexter's Bush supports numerous animal species typical of remnant riparian bushland in the Dandenong Creek corridor. The intact understory of orchids, sedges, and native grasses provides important habitat for birds, insects, and small mammals.

== Conservation and management ==
Dexter’s Bush is maintained by the Maroondah City Council Bushland Management Team with support from the local community group Heathmont Bushcare, which has conducted working bees and plantings since 1994. Dexter's Bush benefits from:

- Weed removal and revegetation efforts
- Seed and cutting propagation at Community of Ringwood Indigenous Species Plant Nursery.
- Conservation of regionally rare plant communities.

== Legacy ==
Liz Dexter (birth date unknown – 30 July 2021) and Mick Dexter (birth date unknown – 12 May 2025) remain highly regarded for their contribution to local conservation. Their foresight in gifting and stewarding the reserve has preserved one of the last strongholds of wet heathy woodland in Maroondah. Their contributions continue through the work of Heathmont Bushcare and the Community of Ringwood Indigenous Species Plant Nursery.
