= Cobboboonee National Park =

- IUCN category II (national park)
- Location within Victoria
- Location: Victoria
- Nearest city: Heywood
- Coordinates: 38°07′35″S 141°26′47″E
- Area: 185.1 km^{2} (71.5 sq mi)
- Established: November 2008
- Governing body: Parks Victoria
- Website: http://parkweb.vic.gov.au/explore/parks/cobboboonee-national-park

The Cobboboonee National Park is a national park located in the Barwon South West region of Victoria, Australia. The 18,510-hectare (45,700-acre) national park is situated approximately 360 kilometres (220 mi) west of Melbourne city centre, with access via the town of Heywood near the junctions of the Princes and Henty highways, north of Portland.

Prior to its proclamation as a national park in November 2008, the area was formerly the Cobboboonee State Forest. The Lower Glenelg National Park is located to the west of the park and the Fitzroy River arises from the swamps within the park. Part of the course of the Great South West Walk is located within the park.

The Gunditjmara people are the traditional owners of the area containing the national park.

== See also ==
- Protected areas of Victoria
