= Mount Granya State Park =

- IUCN category II (national park)
- Location within Victoria
- Location: Victoria
- Nearest city: Wodonga
- Coordinates: 36.10717653°S 147.284485°E
- Area: 61.4 km^{2} (23.7 sq mi)
- Established: 1995
- Governing body: Parks Victoria
- Website: Official website

Mount Granya State Park is a 6,140 hectares (15,200 acres) state park near Wodonga on the northern border of Victoria, Australia. It is named after Mount Granya, an 870 m peak. The terrain is generally steep and rocky with eucalyptus forest and low shrub.
