= Parks Victoria =

Government agency of Victoria, Australia

Coordinates: 37°48′57.4″S 144°57′28.1″E

Agency overview
- Formed: 12 December 1996
- Jurisdiction: Government of Victoria
- Headquarters: 300 La Trobe Street, Melbourne, Victoria, Australia
- Motto: Into nature to create a better Victoria.
- Employees: 927 (June 2024)
- Minister responsible: The Hon. Steve Dimopoulos MP
- Agency executive: Lee Miezis, Chief Executive Officer
- Website: www.parks.vic.gov.au

Parks Victoria is a government agency of the state of Victoria, Australia.

Parks Victoria was established in December 1996 as a statutory authority, reporting to the Victorian Minister for Environment. The Parks Victoria Act 2018 updates the previous act, Parks Victoria Act 1998. Under the new Act, Parks Victoria is responsible for managing over '...18 per cent of Victoria’s landmass (4.1 million hectares) and 70 per cent of Victoria’s coastline'.

== History ==
Parks Victoria replaced many of the functions and absorbed the staff from the Department of Natural Resources and Environment (which managed National and State parks) and Melbourne Parks & Waterways. Melbourne Parks & Waterways was originally part of the former Melbourne and Metropolitan Board of Works, which mostly managed urban parklands, some of which were formerly MMBW facilities, such as Braeside Park.

The Department of Natural Resources and Environment itself was part of a succession of government departments, originating back to a number of entities including the Forests Commission Victoria, the Crown Lands and Survey Department, National Park Service, Soil Conservation Authority and Fisheries and Wildlife Service.

== Healthy Parks Healthy People ==
Based on the marketing tagline created by Parks Victoria in 2000, Healthy Parks Healthy People has become a 'global movement that highlights the fundamental connection between environmental health and human health and wellbeing.'

The program highlights 'the critical role that Victoria's parks can play in encouraging a healthier, more liveable and more connected community.'

== Notable places managed by Parks Victoria ==
- Grampians National Park
- Wilsons Promontory National Park
- Point Nepean National Park
- Great Otway National Park
- Buchan Caves Reserve
- Werribee Parks and Mansion
- Rickett's Point Marine Sanctuary
- Cape Otway Lightstation
- Gabo Island
- Oriental Claims Historic Area

== See also ==
- National Council for Fire & Emergency Services
- NSW National Parks & Wildlife Service
- Queensland Parks and Wildlife Service
- Tasmania Parks and Wildlife Service
- National Parks and Wildlife Service South Australia
- Department of Biodiversity, Conservation and Attractions
- Parks and Wildlife Commission of the Northern Territory
