= Brit Brit =

Brit Brit Victoria
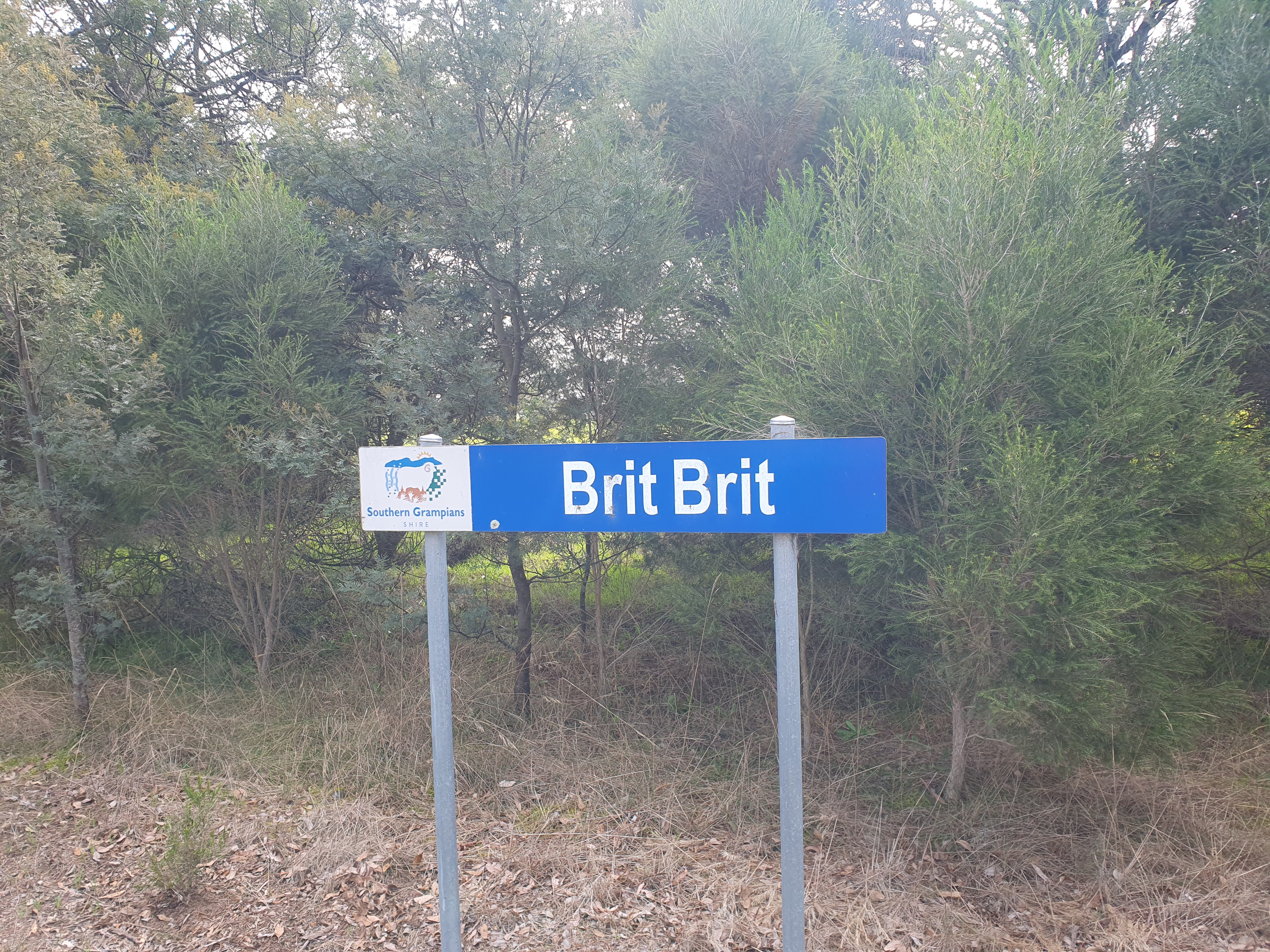

- Coordinates: 37°27′2″S 141°44′17″E
- Population: 42 (2021)
- Postcode(s): 3315
- Location: 346 km (215 mi) W of Melbourne; 54 km (34 mi) NW of Hamilton; 20 km (12 mi) N of Coleraine; 27 km (17 mi) S of Balmoral
- LGA(s): Shire of Southern Grampians
- State electorate(s): Lowan
- Federal division(s): Wannon
Localities around Brit Brit:
Pigeon Ponds	Balmoral	Englefield
Coojar	Brit Brit	Gringegalgona
Konongwootong	Wootong Vale	Melville Forest

Brit Brit is a locality and parish in the Shire of Southern Grampians in the Western District of Victoria, Australia.

== Etymology ==
The name Brit Brit is believed to derive from the local indigenous word for plovers, common to the area.

== History ==
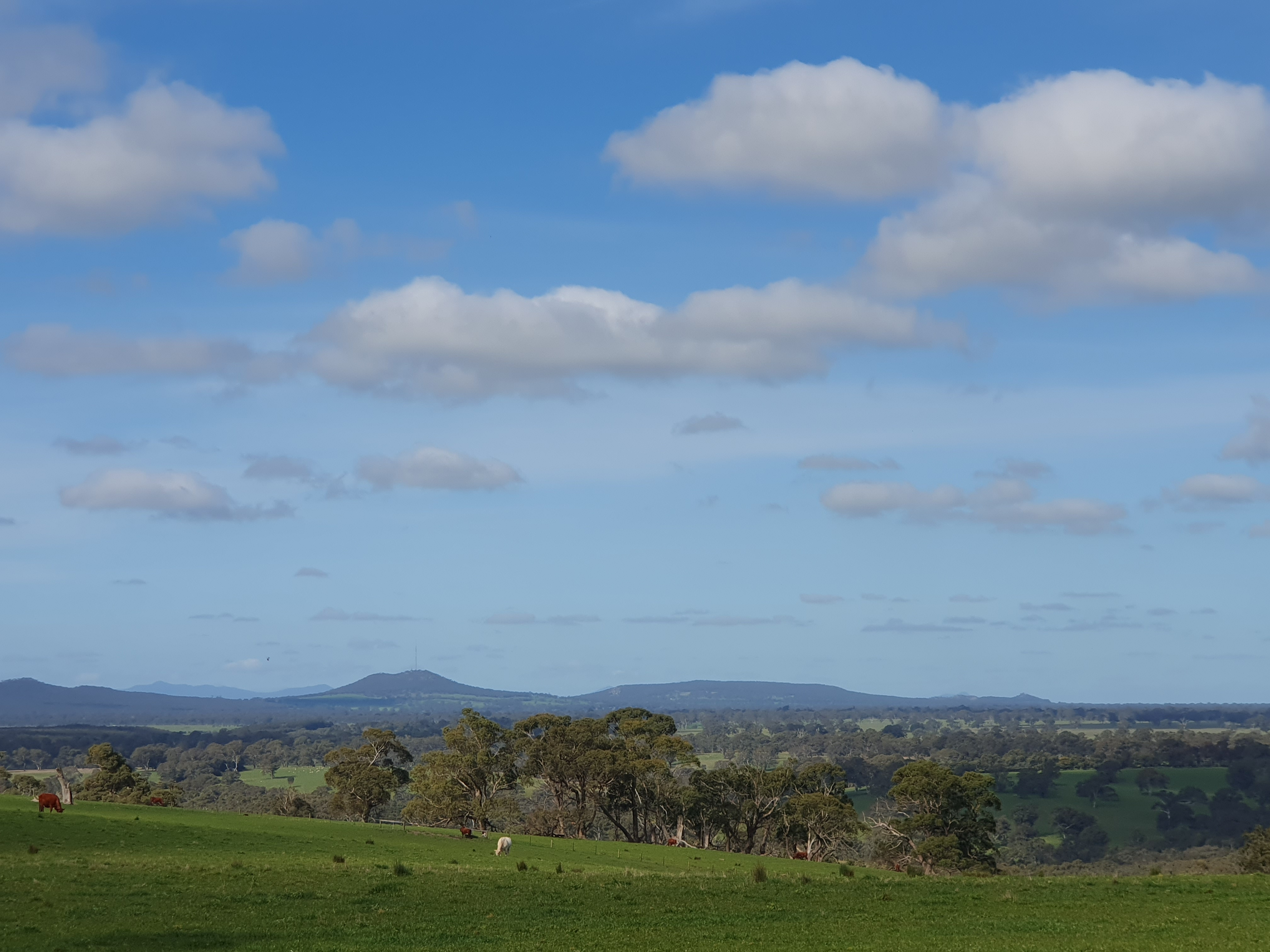
View from Brit Brit towards Mount Dundas

Brit Brit was originally part of Gringegalgona station. In 1920 Gringegalgona was subdivided as part of the Soldier Settlement scheme for soldiers returning from the First World War. Blocks were subdivided into approximately 900 acre sections, and leased to soldiers on the proviso that they were improved, fenced and cleared appropriately.

Brit Brit had two different state schools; the first being "Rosebank farm" school which was built in 1874 and closed in 1910. The second school was Brit Brit State School no. 1332. This school was first run out of the Brit Brit post office in 1927 before a portable building was relocated to Brit Brit in 1928. The school closed in 1948 and the building was moved to Balmoral to become part of Balmoral Consolidated School.

Brit Brit once had a post office and manual telephone exchange.

Brit Brit used to have a golf course.

== Demographics ==
As of the 2021 Australian census, 42 people resided in Brit Brit, up from 39 in the 2016 census. The median age of persons in Brit Brit was 31 years. There were more males than females, with 51.1% of the population male and 48.9% female. The average household size was 2.8 people per household.

== See also ==
- List of reduplicated Australian place names
