= Dundas River =

River in Victoria, Australia

Dundas
- Location of the Dundas River mouth in Victoria

Location
- Country: Australia
- State: Victoria
- Region: Victorian Midlands, Naracoorte Coastal Plain (IBRA), Western District
- Local government area: Southern Grampians Shire

Physical characteristics
- Source: Mount Dundas
  - location: south of Vasey
  - coordinates: 37°25′13″S 141°54′26″E
  - elevation: 244 m (801 ft)
- Mouth: confluence with Wannon River
  - location: west of Cavendish
  - coordinates: 37°32′1″S 142°0′49″E
  - elevation: 198 m (650 ft)
- Length: 19 km (12 mi)

Basin features
- River system: Glenelg Hopkins catchment
- Tributaries
  - left: Stony Creek (Southern Grampians, Victoria), McGill Creek

The Dundas River, a perennial river of the Glenelg Hopkins catchment, is located in the Western District of Victoria, Australia.

== Course and features ==
The Dundas River rises below Mount Dundas, south of Vasey, and flows generally east by southeast, joined by two minor tributaries before reaching its confluence with Wannon River west of Cavendish. The river descends 46 metres (151 ft) over its 19-kilometre (12 mi) course.

== See also ==
- List of rivers of Australia § Victoria
