= Adam Campbell =

Adam Campbell may refer to:

- Adam Campbell (actor) (born 1980), English actor
- Adam Campbell (Australian footballer) (born 1985), Australian rules footballer
- Adam Campbell (footballer, born 1995), English association footballer
- Adam Campbell (politician), Canadian political candidate for the district of Vegreville—Wainwright in 2008
