= Chetwynd River =

River in Victoria, Australia

Chetwynd
- Location of the Chetwynd River mouth in Victoria

Location
- Country: Australia
- State: Victoria (Australia)
- Region: Victorian Midlands, Naracoorte Coastal Plain (IBRA), Western District
- Local government area: Southern Grampians Shire

Physical characteristics
- Source
  - location: west of Nareen
  - coordinates: 37°25′13″S 141°54′26″E
  - elevation: 244 m (801 ft)
- Mouth: confluence with Glenelg River
  - location: southwest of Moree
  - coordinates: 37°22′46″S 141°32′24″E
  - elevation: 92 m (302 ft)
- Length: 33 km (21 mi)

Basin features
- River system: Glenelg Hopkins catchment

The Chetwynd River, a perennial river of the Glenelg Hopkins catchment, is located in the Western District of Victoria, Australia.

== Course and features ==
The Chetwynd River rises southwest of Nareen, and flows generally west by north before reaching its confluence with the Glenelg River west of Moree. The river descends 139 metres (456 ft) over its 33-kilometre (21 mi) course. It can be crossed by vehicle (in order from upstream) at the east end of Steep Gully road, Nareen, then Tites bridge on Careys road, Nareen, then at the Casterton-Edenhope road about one mile south of Chetwynd, and again on the same road at the bridge 40 yards east of the Chetwynd T-junction, and finally just east of the northernmost point of the Chetwynd Junction road.

Flow in late summer can be reduced to a trickle, but after good rains in July/August flow rates can approach 5000L/sec.

Major Thomas Mitchell, Surveyor-General of New South Wales, explored the district in 1836. His party camped beside the Chetwynd River on the night of 4 August. He named the river "Chetwynd" after his second-in-command, Granville William Chetwynd Stapylton. Stapylton was subsequently dispatched to trace the Chetwynd River to its confluence with the Glenelg River, some 10 miles north.

== See also ==
- List of rivers of Australia § Victoria
