= Wannon River =

River in Victoria, Australia

Wannon
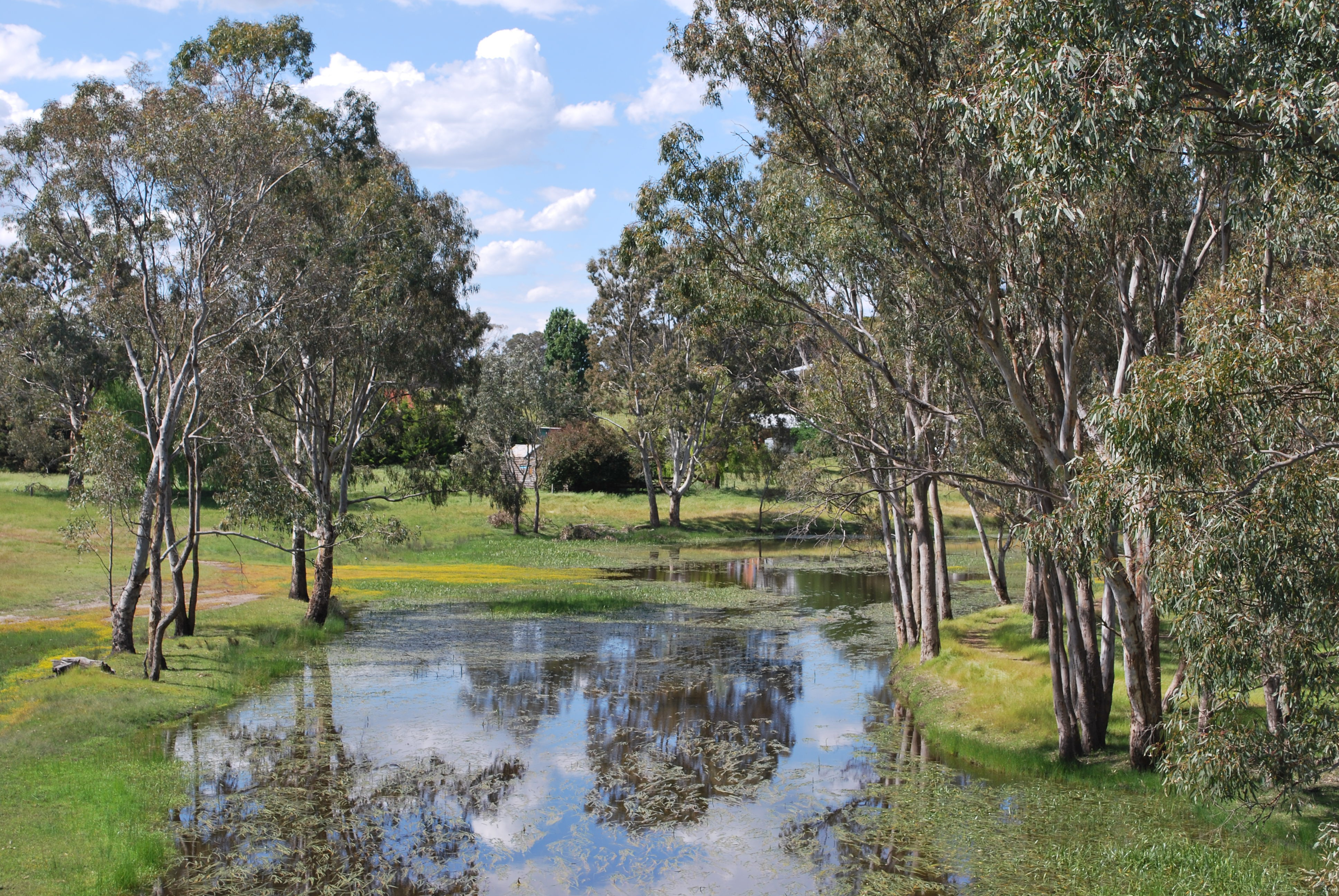
- Wannon River at Cavendish

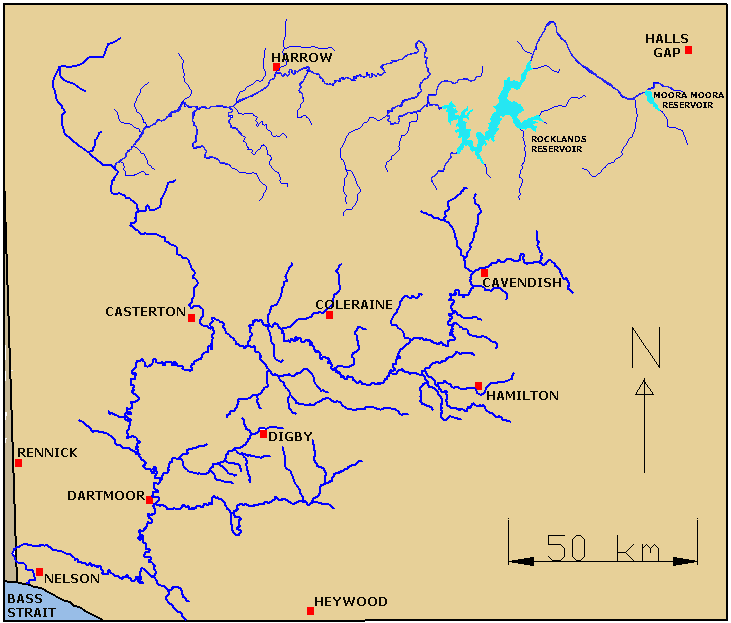
- Map of Glenelg and Wannon river basins, in western Victoria

Location
- Country: Australia
- State: Victoria (Australia)
- Region: Victorian Midlands (IBRA), Western District
- Local government areas: Southern Grampians, Glenelg
- Town: Cavendish

Physical characteristics
- Source: Mount Wiiliam, Grampians Range
  - location: northeast of Dunkeld
  - coordinates: 37°35′37″S 142°27′29″E
  - elevation: 256 m (840 ft)
- Mouth: confluence with the Glenelg River
  - location: near Casterton
  - coordinates: 37°36′50″S 141°25′34″E
  - elevation: 42 m (138 ft)
- Length: 220 km (140 mi)

Basin features
- River system: Glenelg Hopkins catchment
- Waterfalls: Wannon, Nigretta

The Wannon River (/ˈwɒnən/) is a perennial river of the Glenelg Hopkins catchment, in the Western District of Victoria, Australia.

== Name ==
The name of the river "is believed to have been obtained by Major Mitchell from the local Jardwadjali people".

== Location and features ==
The Wannon River rises below Mount William, part of the Grampians Range in the Grampians National Park. The river flows generally south, initially towards Dunkeld, and then north by west and then west, through the town of Cavendish before heading south to the settlement of Wannon. From here the river flows west towards Casterton where it reaches its confluence with the Glenelg River. The Wannon is joined by twelve tributaries including the Dundas River. The river descends 214 metres (702 ft) over its 188-kilometre (117 mi) course.

The Henty Brothers found that the river played a significant role in the early settlement of the area surrounding the Wannon River. Also of note was the situation of the Mokanger Station, in Cavendish, purchased by Thomas and Andrew Chirnside in 1842.

The main land use along the river is production of sheep for wool. Other land uses include production of sheep for prime lambs and cattle for beef.

Wannon Falls and Nigretta Falls, both waterfalls of note, are found on the river approximately 20 kilometres (12 mi) west of Hamilton. These tourist attractions have facilities for visitors. During the 1880s, impressionist painter Louis Buvelot painted many scenes around the falls and the river.

The Division of Wannon, an Australian Electoral Division, is named after the river. The Division was held from 1955 until 1983 by former Prime Minister Malcolm Fraser.
