= Wannon Falls =

Waterfalls in Victoria, Australia

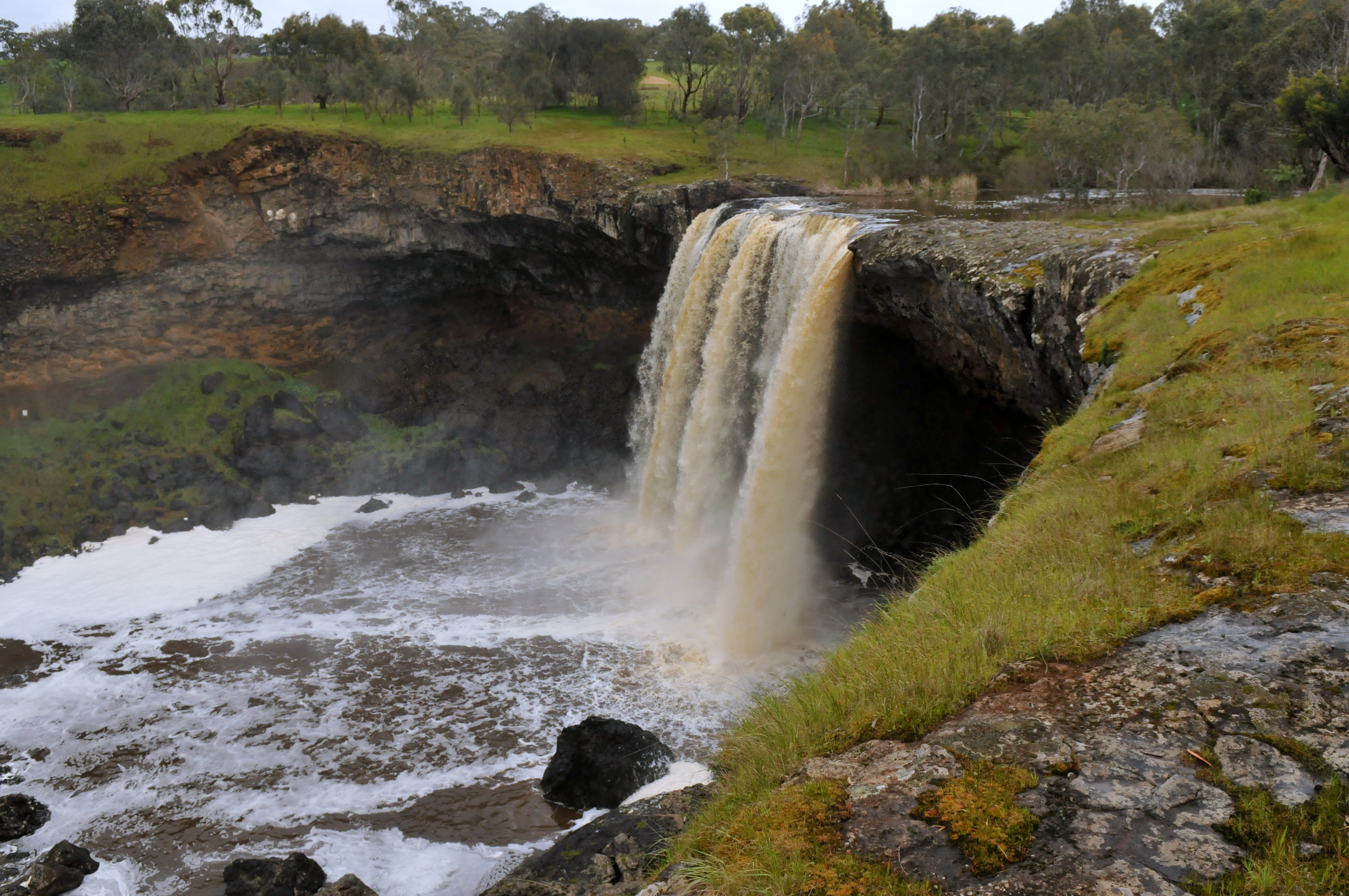
- Wannon Falls

- Location within Victoria
- Location: Grampian, Victoria, Australia
- Coordinates: 37°40′35″S 141°50′27″E
- Type: Punchbowl
- Total height: 30 m (98 ft)
- Number of drops: 1
- Watercourse: Wannon River

The Wannon Falls are a punchbowl waterfall located in the Southern Grampians Shire, approximately 19 kilometres (12 mi) west of Hamilton, in western Victoria, Australia. The falls are fed by the Wannon River that has its head waters in the Grampians mountains.

== Location and features ==
The falls are unexpected after driving west across gently undulating lava plains. They plunge over a basalt lava cliff dropping into a large plunge pool 30 metres (98 ft) below. In the winter wet season they can be spectacular, and at the end of the summer dry season they may shrink to a mere trickle. Downstream of the falls there is a narrow steep-walled valley, with cascades around large blocks that have fallen in from the sides. The narrow valley was eroded as the falls retreated upstream as a result of undermining of a soft bed of sediments that underlies the hard basalt.

Adjacent to the falls there is a recreational reserve with picnic areas and some interpretation signs, and a larger scenic reserve that has natural native vegetation and some disturbed areas that have been replanted with natives.

== See also ==
- List of waterfalls
- List of waterfalls in Australia
- Nigretta Falls
