= Rocklands Dam =

Dam in Victoria, Australia

- Location of the dam in Victoria
- Interactive map of Rocklands Dam
- Country: Australia
- Location: Wimmera, Victoria
- Coordinates: 37°14′05″S 141°57′36″E
- Purpose: Water supply
- Status: Operational
- Construction began: 1938
- Opening date: 1953
- Owner: GWM Water

Dam and spillways
- Type of dam: Gravity dam; Rock-filled dam
- Impounds: Glenelg River
- Height: 24 m (79 ft)
- Length: 490 m (1,610 ft)
- Dam volume: 69×10^{3} m^{3} (2.4×10^{6} cu ft)
- Spillways: 1
- Spillway type: Uncontrolled
- Spillway capacity: 764 m^{3}/s (27,000 cu ft/s)

Reservoir
- Creates: Rocklands Reservoir
- Total capacity: 348,310 ML (282,380 acre⋅ft)
- Active capacity: 261,510 ML (212,010 acre⋅ft)
- Catchment area: 1,380 km^{2} (530 sq mi)
- Surface area: 6,850 ha (16,900 acres)
- Maximum water depth: 17 m (56 ft)
- Normal elevation: 195.5 m (641 ft) AHD
- Website gwmwater.org.au

The Rocklands Dam is a gravity dam with rock-filled embankments across the Glenelg River, in the Wimmera region of Victoria, Australia. Completed in 1953, the resultant eponymous reservoir, the Rocklands Reservoir, was created for the supply of potable water for the region. The dam and reservoir are the largest operated by Grampians–Wimmera–Mallee Water (GWMWater).

== Dam and reservoir overview ==
=== Dam ===
Construction of the dam began in 1938; however, during World War II, construction ceased, recommenced in 1950, and the dam was completed in 1953. The concrete-faced dam wall is 24 metres (79 ft) high and 490 metres (1,610 ft) long. When full, the resultant reservoir has a storage capacity of 348.31 gigalitres (282,380 acre⋅ft) and covers 6,850 hectares (16,900 acres), drawn from a catchment area of 1,380 square kilometres (530 sq mi). The uncontrolled spillway has a discharge capacity of 764 cubic metres per second (27,000 cu ft/s). The main wall is flanked by two 15-metre-high (49 ft) embankment sections.

=== Reservoir ===
Originally constructed to supply the Wimmera-Mallee Domestic and Stock channel system, water held by the reservoir is now used for many different purposes. A unique feature of the reservoir is that all entitlement holders, including the environment, are able to be supplied with water from the reservoir.

The reservoir is a popular recreational boating location, with powerboating, water skiing and jet skiing allowed. Camping is permitted in designated areas. During the duck hunting season, duck shooting is allowed. It is also a popular fishing spot, with Murray cod, redfin, trout and carp taken at all times of the year. The reservoir was one of the premier carp fishing destinations in the late 1990s and early 2000s with carp in excess of 10 kilograms (22 lb) regularly caught.

The reservoir is listed on the Southern Grampians Shire local government heritage register.

== See also ==
- List of reservoirs and dams in Victoria
