= Nigretta Falls =

Waterfalls in Victoria, Australia

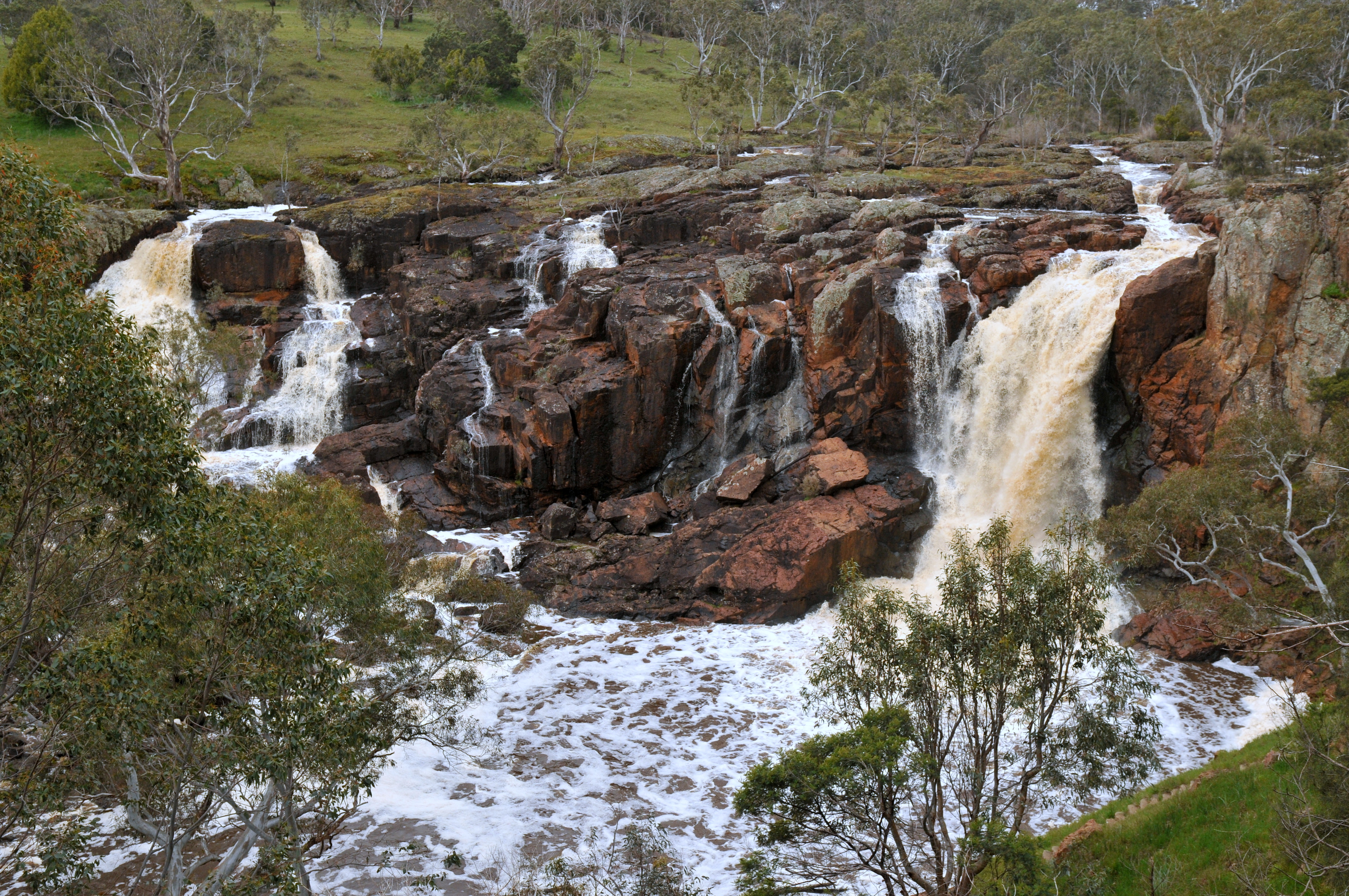
- Nigretta Falls

- Location within Victoria
- Location: Grampian, Victoria, Australia
- Coordinates: 37°39′22″S 141°55′28″E
- Type: Segmented
- Number of drops: numerous
- Watercourse: Wannon River

Nigretta Falls, previously known as the Upper Wannon Falls, is a waterfall located in the Southern Grampians Shire, approximately 16 kilometres (9.9 mi) west of Hamilton, Victoria, Australia. The waterfall is fed by the Wannon River that has its head waters in the Grampians mountains.

== Location and features ==
The falls tumble over many rocky outcrops creating several streams of falling water and then drop into a large pool at the base before continuing its journey to the Wannon Falls some 10 kilometres (6.2 mi) downstream. In contrast to the single plunge of the Wannon Falls, Nigretta is a more interesting, multi-channel segmented cascade of smaller drops and bounces guided by patterns of joints in a much older (Devonian) rhyolitic volcanic rock. However, as with the Wannon Falls, the amount of water varies with the time of year – the photo shows a late winter, wet season, view. The Nigretta Scenic Reserve includes parts of the Wannon River Valley which contains representatives of the native plants of the Dundas Tablelands, listed in the reference.

== See also ==
- List of waterfalls
- List of waterfalls in Australia
