= Glenelg River (Victoria) =

River in Victoria and South Australia

Glenelg
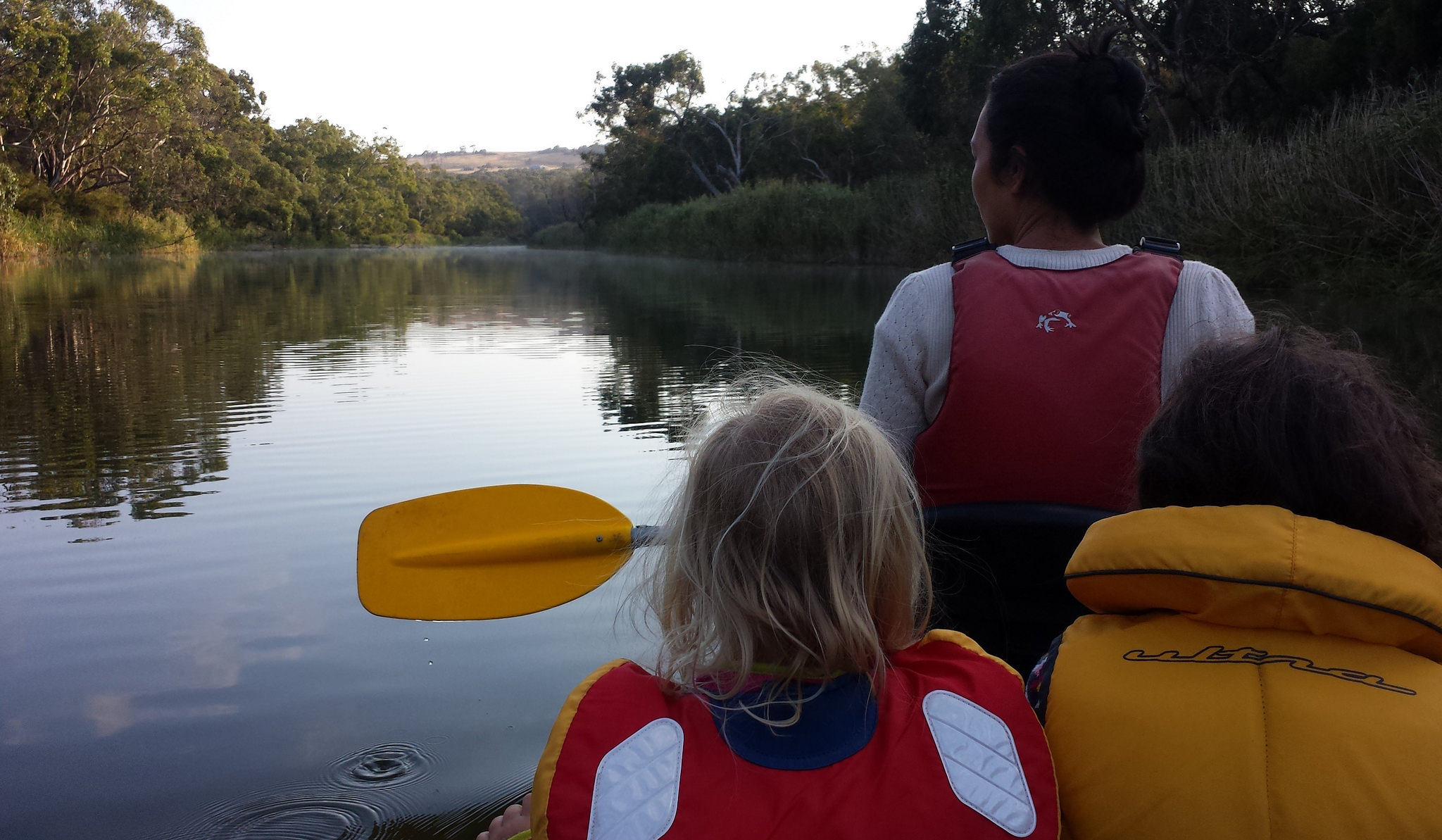
- Family canoeing on the Glenelg River

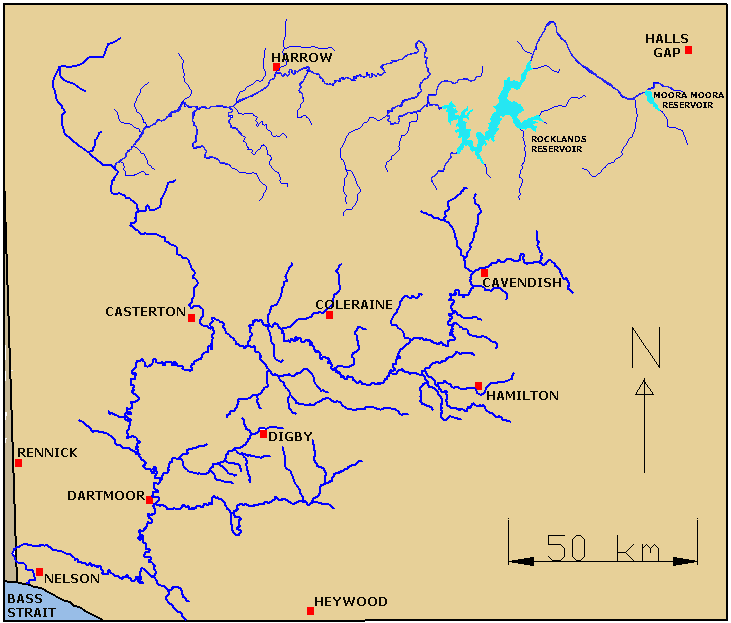
- Map of Glenelg River catchment
- Etymology: In honour of the Colonial Secretary, Baron Glenelg, Charles Grant
- Native name: Bochara (undetermined); Worrewurnin; Bugara; Temiangandgeen; Wurri-wurri; Barrawy; Barker; Wurru-wurru

Location
- Country: Australia
- States: Victoria, South Australia
- Region: Victorian Midlands, Naracoorte Coastal Plain (IBRA), Western Victoria, Limestone Coast, South Australia
- Local government areas: Southern Grampians (V), West Wimmera (V), Glenelg (V), Grant (SA)
- Settlements: Balmoral (V), Harrow (V), Casterton (V), Dartmoor (V), Donovans (SA), Nelson (V)

Physical characteristics
- Source: Grampian Ranges
  - location: Grampians National Park, Victoria
  - coordinates: 37°20′57″S 142°15′57″E
  - elevation: 759 m (2,490 ft)
- Mouth: Discovery Bay, Great Australian Bight
  - location: Nelson, Victoria
  - coordinates: 38°03′39″S 140°59′8″E
  - elevation: 0 m (0 ft)
- Length: 350 km (220 mi)
- Basin size: 12,660 km^{2} (4,890 sq mi)
- Discharge
  - location: mouth
  - average: 35 m^{3}/s (1,200 cu ft/s)

Basin features
- River system: Glenelg Hopkins catchment
- Tributaries
  - left: Chetwynd River, Wannon River, Stokes River (Victoria), Crawford River (Victoria)
- National parks: Grampians, Lower Glenelg

The Glenelg River, a perennial river of the Glenelg Hopkins catchment, is located in the Australian states of Victoria and South Australia.

The river rises in the Grampian Ranges and flows generally north, then west, then south, for over 350 kilometres (220 mi), making the river the longest river in south-west Victoria and third longest overall. A short stretch of the lower end winds through southeastern South Australia before returning to Victoria to enter Discovery Bay at Nelson. The Glenelg River is a central feature of the Lower Glenelg National Park.

The river was named after Colonial Secretary Baron Glenelg, Charles Grant, by Major Thomas Mitchell in August 1836.

Large amounts of water diverted from the upper reaches of the river for agricultural purposes, including irrigation and town water demands. The estuary is listed under the Heritage Rivers Act, 1992 (VIC) and is a nationally important wetland.

== History ==
=== Aboriginal history ===
The Glenelg was important to Indigenous Australians. It formed the traditional tribal boundaries for the Bungandidj people (western bank) and Gunditjmara people (eastern bank) people from two distinct language groups. Little archeological evidence has been found of Bunganditj inhabitation along the banks of the river, including in regional caves. However, there is strong evidence of their presence further towards the coastal areas. While strong evidence of Gunditjmara activity has been found along the river's eastern hinterland and shell middens discovered may indicate multiple nomadic tribes camping along the river that may have used message sticks to communicate. It is not known how long indigenous Australians had been associated with the river, however it is estimated to have been many thousands of years.

=== European history ===
Major Thomas Mitchell was the first European to visit and cross the river in August 1836, noting its width and its suitability for boating, naming it for Colonial Secretary Baron Glenelg, Charles Grant. A cenotaph at Nelson marks the crossing point. The first Europeans arrived in 1840. Thomas Ricketts moved from the Barwon River to the Glenelg and established "Clunie" on its southern boundary. Historians noted the hostility of the Indigenous people of the area who drove Ricketts out of the settlement and conflicted with many others. Addison and Murray from Van Diemen's Land set up the sheep run Dunrobin in January, 1840 after which more than half a dozen squatters others followed, and by the end of the year, many properties had river frontages and the population grew gradually thereafter.

A punt built in 1848 by Henry Kellett at Nelson was the first permanent crossing of the river. In 1860 a body of Mr Hunt and his wife were discovered under a bridge at Casterton, after which Mr Waines was subsequently tried and hanged for the murder. On 1 July 1861, at Chetwynd station, a large tornado occurred reportedly killing a man. In 1866, one of the earliest artists depictions of the river by engraver Frederick Grosse "View of the River Glenelg, South Australia" was published depicting boating among its steep limestone cliffs. The earliest crossings over the Glenelg were at Casterton. The first crossing over the wider reaches of the lower Glenelg was constructed out of wood in 1893 in Nelson. It was replaced by the current steel cantilever bridge in 1963.

== Location and features ==
The Glenelg River rises at an elevation of 760 metres (2,490 ft) above sea level below The Chimney Pots within the Grampians National Park, on the eastern slopes of the Victoria Range, and west of the Serra Range, within the Grampian Range. The river flows north through swampland before heading west, transversed by the Henty Highway, and then south where the river is impounded by the Rocklands Reservoir, formed by a concrete-walled gravity dam with embankment sections constructed in 1953. The reservoir has a maximum capacity of 348,300 megalitres (7.66×10^{10} imp gal; 9.20×10^{10} US gal). Leaving the dam wall, the river flows west through state forestry areas towards Balmoral, where the river is joined by the Salt, Mather, Yarramyljup, and Schofield Creeks, flowing to the east, north, then west of Balmoral, through the settlement of Harrow, where the river is met by another creek, also called Salt Creek. The Chetwynd River, draining the region north of Casterton and Coleraine, joins the Glenelg east of Burke Bridge. The Glenelg flows generally southwest, to the west of Dergholm State Park towards Dergholm, joined by a number of minor tributaries. From here the river flows south by east, through the town of Casterton, and south of which the 220-kilometre (140 mi) Wannon River forms its confluence with the Glenelg. Flowing south by west, the Glenelg flows through the Wilkin Flora and Fauna Reserve before heading due south, met by the Stokes River prior to flowing through the town of Dartmoor where the Crawford River forms its confluence with the Glenelg. Flowing south, then sharply west and crossing the state border into South Australia, the Glenelg flows through Donovans before heading east back into Victoria. The river reaches its mouth at Nelson and much of the latter course is through the Lower Glenelg National Park. From its highest point, the Glenelg River descends 760 metres (2,490 ft), joined by thirty-two named tributaries over its 350-kilometre (220 mi) course.

=== Communities and significant crossings along the river ===
There are many crossings over the Glenelg River, including road, rail and pedestrian. Some additional roads allow passage through shallow sections of the river when the water levels are low.

Location	Bridge name	Comments/use	Image
Kanagulk		Natimuk Hamilton Road	
Harrow		Coleraine-Edenhope Road	
Connewirricoo		Kandnock-Connewirricoo Road	
Kadnook		Casterton-Edenhope Road	
Dergholm		Dergholm-Chetwynd Road	
Warrock		Warrock Road	
Dunrobin		Section Road	
Casterton		Glenelg Highway	
Casterton		Anderson Street	
Sandford		Sandford-Ballgalah Road	
Bahgallah		Casterton-Dartmoor Road	
Strathdownie		Myaring-Pieracle Road	
Dartmoor		Greenham Street	
Dartmoor		Railway crossing	
Dartmoor		Princes Highway	
Nelson		Portland-Nelson Road; 1893 wooden; 1963 steel cantilever	

=== Glenelg River Canoe Trail ===
The Glenelg River Canoe Trail can be found through the lower reaches of the river. Starting in Dartmoor, there is a stretch of flat water approximately 75 kilometres long, eventually ending in Nelson.

== Flora and fauna ==
The Glenelg River mussel, once plentiful but now critically endangered, lives in small populations along the river. Work is being done to improve its habitat, after it was further threatened by the bushfires in 2019-2020.

Populations of a local fish known as the tupong (Pseudaphritis urvillii) started to recover in the 2010s, after the health of the river had been significantly improved after more than a century of environmental degradation caused by the introduction of agriculture. Two Australian grayling were observed in early 2021, the first recorded sighting since 1899, and scientists are hopeful that they will make a similar comeback.

== See also ==
- Great South West Walk
- List of rivers of Australia
