= Gringegalgona =

Victorian locality

- Town
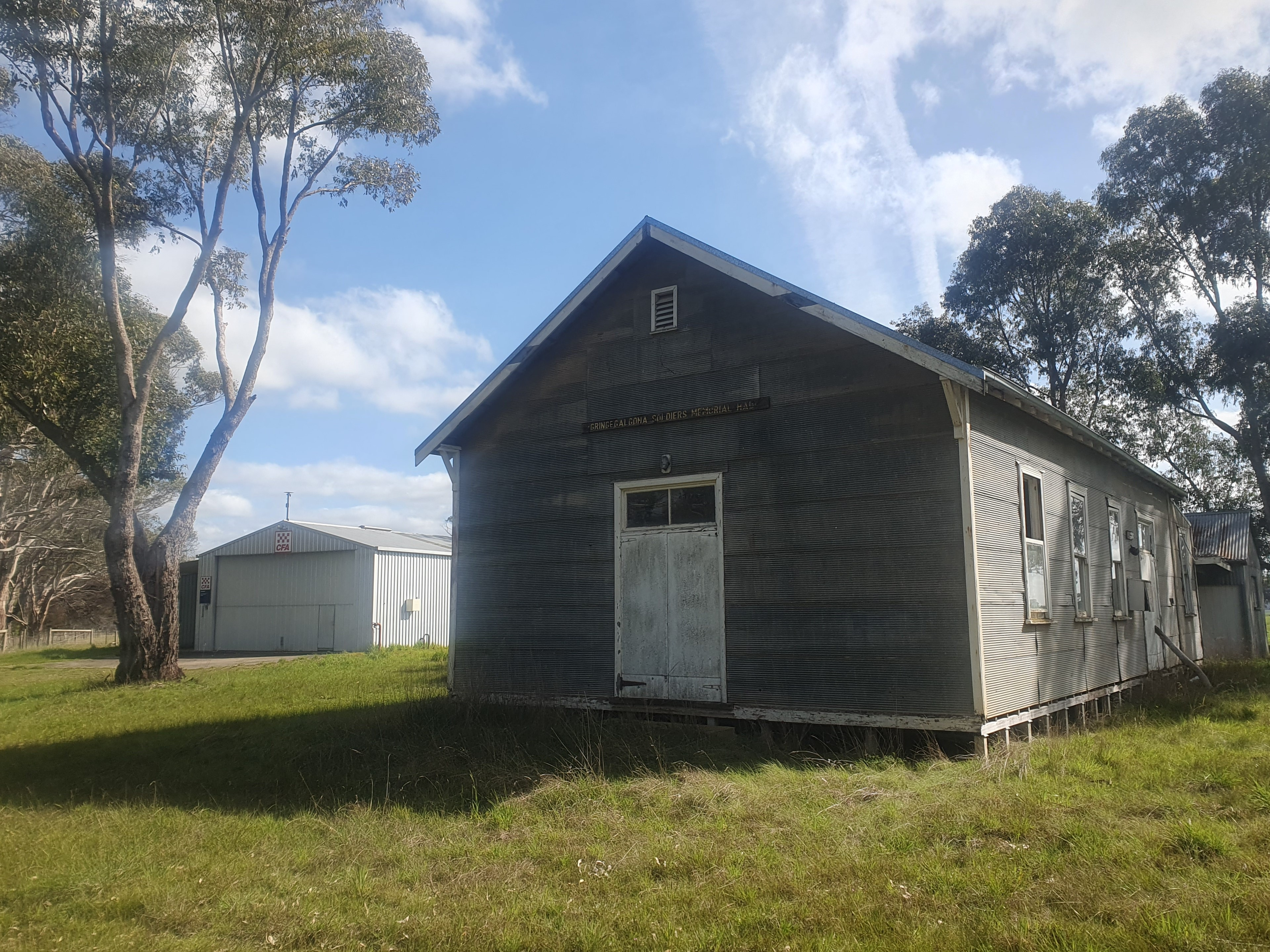
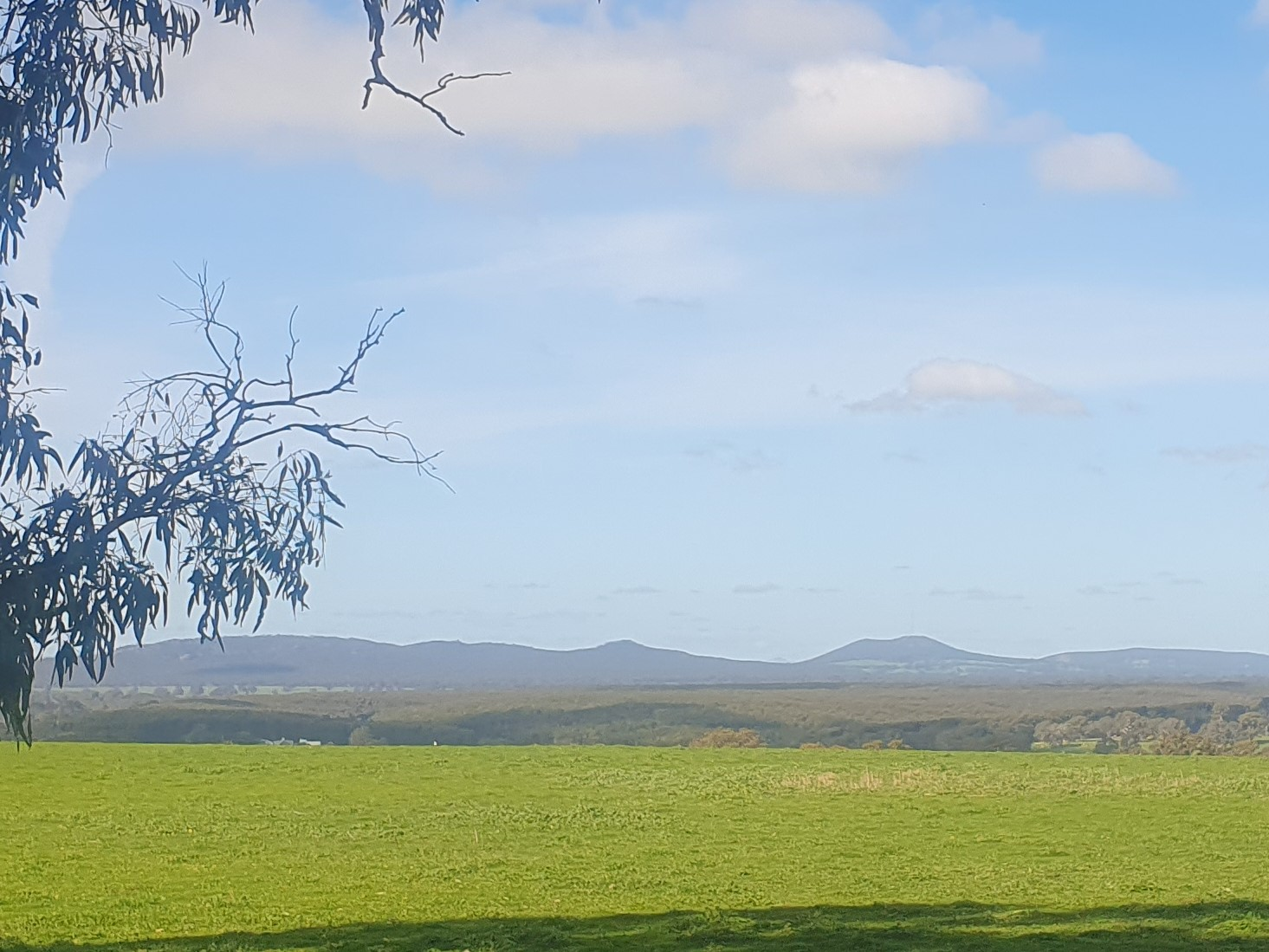
- Gringegalgona Hall and Fire Shed, 2023 View from Gringegalgona towards Mount Dundas

- Interactive map of Gringegalgona
- Coordinates: 37°25′S 141°47′E
- Country: Australia
- State: Victoria
- LGA: Shire of Southern Grampians
- Location: 340 km (210 mi) W of Melbourne; 60 km (37 mi) NW of Hamilton; 20 km (12 mi) S of Balmoral; 26 km (16 mi) N of Coleraine

Government
  - State electorate: Lowan
  - Federal division: Wannon

Population
  - Total: 44 (2021 census)
- Postcode: 3315, 3407
Localities around Gringegalgona
Coojar	Englefield	Vasey
Brit Brit	Gringegalgona	Vasey
Wootong Vale	Melville Forest	Gatum

Gringegalgona, also known as Gringe, is a locality in Western Victoria, Australia. At the 2021 Census Gringegalgona had a population of 44.

== Etymology ==
The area is named for the homestead and station, squatted by Simon Cadden in 1843. The name is believed to be indigenous in origin, with locals believing it means "water like urine" or to "micturate on a tussock".

== History ==
The original size of Gringegalgona station was approximately 58,880 acres and could run approximately 16,000 sheep. Simon Cadden was killed by local indigenous people in and was buried in a lone grave on the station. The grave still exists nearby the ruins of Cadden's original homestead. The station was passed on to William Lewis in 1854. In 1860 the station was subdivided and was co-owned by William Lewis and John Lewis until 1861 when Duncan Robertson purchased Gringegalgona. Robertson was from Scotland and spoke Scottish Gaelic as a first language. Robertson built the present homestead in 1873, using sandstone from nearby Mt Melville in the Dundas Ranges.

It was common for kangaroo drives to take place on Gringegalgona. Kangaroos were rounded up into yards and beaten to death.

Sheep on the station were washed in a large dam, known as a sheepwash, prior to shearing. A sawmill was nearby to the sheepwash.

In 1920 Gringegalgona was subdivided as part of the Soldier Settlement scheme for soldiers returning from the First World War. Blocks were subdivided into approximately 900 acre sections, and leased to soldiers on the proviso that they were improved, fenced and cleared appropriately. A monument to the original soldier settlers is on a plaque in Gringegalgona.

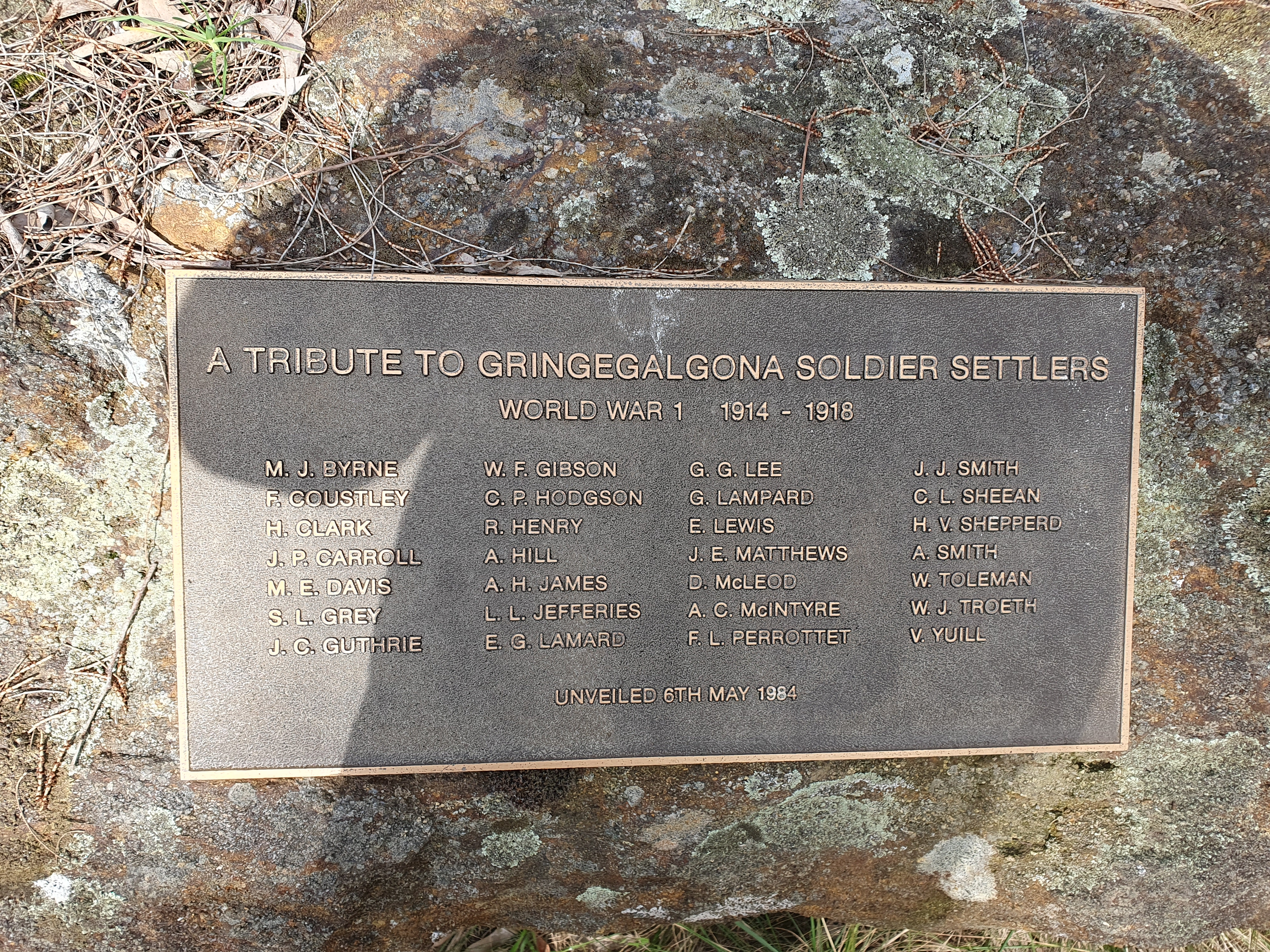
Gringegalgona Settlers Memorial Plaque

In 1925 a soldiers' memorial hall was built in Gringegalgona to honour the fallen in World War One. Built on land donated by soldier settler William Toleman, it was designed by fellow soldier settler Vine Yuill and cost £490 to build. The hall was proposed to be rebuilt in the late 2000s, however some public outcry meant that this did not occur. The hall was re-roofed however the interior was not renovated and the hall is no longer in use.

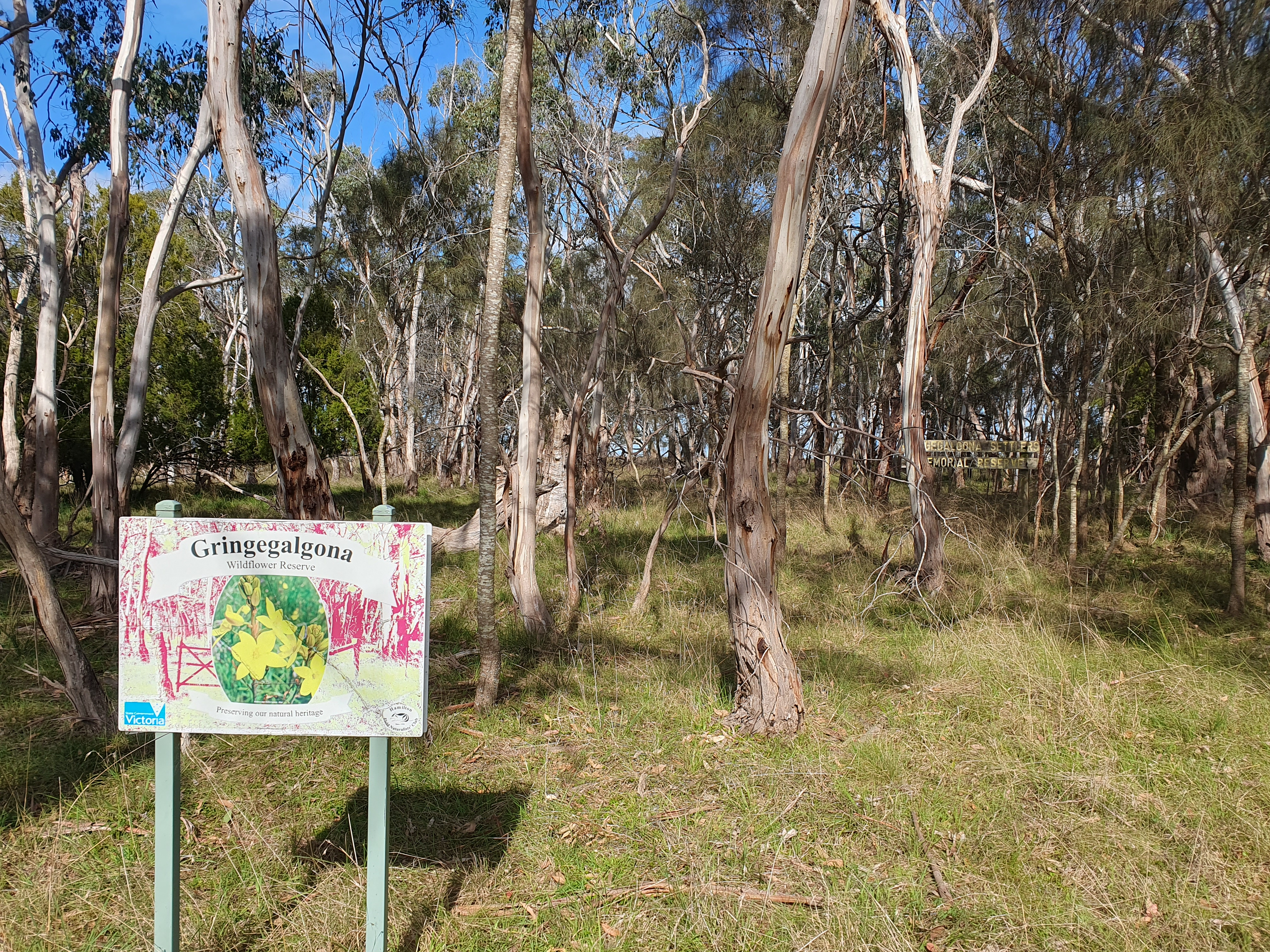
Gringegalgona Settlers Memorial Reserve

Gringegalgona State School (no. 4349) was opened near the hall in 1927. It was run part time with Brit Brit State School until 1928, after which it became a full time school. In 1948 the school closed and was moved to Balmoral to become one of the classrooms of Balmoral Consolidated School. Bil-Bil-Wyt SS no. 1936 and Gringe North no. 4234 State Schools were also located in Gringegalgona. Bil-Bil-Wyt, frequently known as "Browntown" closed in 1903 when the five families with the surname Brown (headed by William Clarke Brown b.1821 d.1908) who used the school all moved to Coleraine. Gringe North was closed in 1945 and the building was moved approximately five kilometres from its original location.

Gringegalgona once had a tennis club, football club and cricket club, however these have all folded.

Gringe Fire Brigade has been based at Gringegalgona since moving from Brit Brit in 1995.

In January 2022 a bushfire was started in Gringegalgona after a red gum was set alight by lightning. This prompted a major response from aerial firefighting planes, volunteer fire brigades, and private firefighting units. The blaze was extinguished before any infrastructure was destroyed. Some fences were damaged however there was no loss of livestock.
