= Hyridella glenelgensis =

Conservation status
- Critically Endangered (IUCN 3.1)

Scientific classification
- Kingdom: Animalia
- Phylum: Mollusca
- Class: Bivalvia
- Order: Unionida
- Family: Hyriidae
- Genus: Hyridella
- Species: H. glenelgensis

Binomial name
- Hyridella glenelgensis (Dennant, 1898)

Species of bivalve

Hyridella glenelgensis, also known as the Glenelg freshwater mussel or Glenelg River mussel, is a species of freshwater mussel, an aquatic bivalve mollusc in the family Unionidae, the river mussels.

The species is endemic to the Glenelg River, which is close to the border between the states of South Australia and Victoria in south-eastern Australia. They used to be plentiful, when the last assessment was done in 2014 there were only about 1000 individuals left, and as of 2020 there are only a few small populations left. They have been affected by run-off of sediment into the river from land that had been degraded by livestock, and then further damaged by the bushfires over the 2019-2020 summer. In October 2020 the Glenelg Hopkins Catchment Management Authority was given funding of A$180,000 by the federal government towards restoring the habitat of the mussel.
