= Bochara =

- Town
- Coordinates: 37°41′46″S 141°54′15″E
- Country: Australia
- State: Victoria
- LGA: Shire of Southern Grampians
- Location: 308.1 km (191.4 mi) W of Melbourne; 11.8 km (7.3 mi) SW of Hamilton

Government
  - State electorate: Lowan
  - Federal division: Wannon

Population
  - Total: 84 (2021)
- Postcode: 3301

Bochara is a township in the Shire of Southern Grampians in the Western District of Victoria, Australia.

== Demographics ==
As of the 2021 Australian census, 84 people resided in Bochara, up from 81 in the 2016 census. The median age of persons in Bochara was 47 years. There were more males than females, with 53.9% of the population male and 46.1% female. The average household size was 2.9 people per household.
