= Crawford River (Victoria) =

Crawford Smoky
- Location of the Crawford River mouth in Victoria

Location
- Country: Australia
- State: Victoria
- Region: Victorian Midlands, Naracoorte Coastal Plain (IBRA), Western District
- Local government area: Glenelg Shire
- Town: Dartmoor

Physical characteristics
- Source
  - location: north of Branxholme
  - coordinates: 37°47′50″S 141°48′25″E
  - elevation: 127 m (417 ft)
- Mouth: confluence with the Glenelg River
  - location: at Dartmoor
  - coordinates: 37°55′38″S 141°17′11″E
  - elevation: 16 m (52 ft)
- Length: 75 km (47 mi)

Basin features
- River system: Glenelg Hopkins catchment
- Tributaries
  - left: Portland Creek
  - right: Kangaroo Creek, Deep Creek (Glenelg, Victoria)
- National park: Crawford River Regional Park

The Crawford River or Smoky River, a perennial river of the Glenelg Hopkins catchment, is located in the Western District of Victoria, Australia.

== Course and features ==
The Crawford River rises north of Branxholme, and flows generally west by south through the Crawford River Regional Park, before reaching its confluence with the Glenelg River at Dartmoor, descending 111 metres (364 ft) over its 75-kilometre (47 mi) course.

== See also ==
- List of rivers of Australia § Victoria
