= Douglas Mine =

Former mine in Victoria, Australia

- Location within Victoria

Location
- Location: Kanagulk, Victoria, Australia; 37°07′36″S 141°47′10″E

Production
- Products: Heavy Minerals

History
- Opened: 2006
- Closed: 2012

Owner
- Company: Iluka Resources
- Website: www.iluka.com

The Douglas Mine, also known as the Douglas and Echo Mine, is a mineral sands mine near the town of Balmoral, Victoria, Australia. It was established in 2006 to mine rutile and zircon, and then closed in 2012. Watpac estimated that it extracted 7.5 million tonnes of mineral sands from the mine.

== Closure ==
Iluka Resources stated that it is committed to rehabilitating the site. However The Age reported that Iluka Resources was seeking approval to continue to operate the Douglas mine site as a dumping ground for up to 20 years. ABC News reported that radioactive gas, a byproduct of the mineral sand mining, had been reported at levels that exceeded the maximum for public exposure.

After the mine closed, The Wimmera Mail-Times reported that local landowners were concerned that the levels of air and water contamination were not being independently monitored. However, the Environment Protection Authority declared that it found that neither pollution or environmental hazard has occurred nor is likely to occur in the future as a result of current and proposed disposal activities.
