= Pigeon Ponds =

- Town
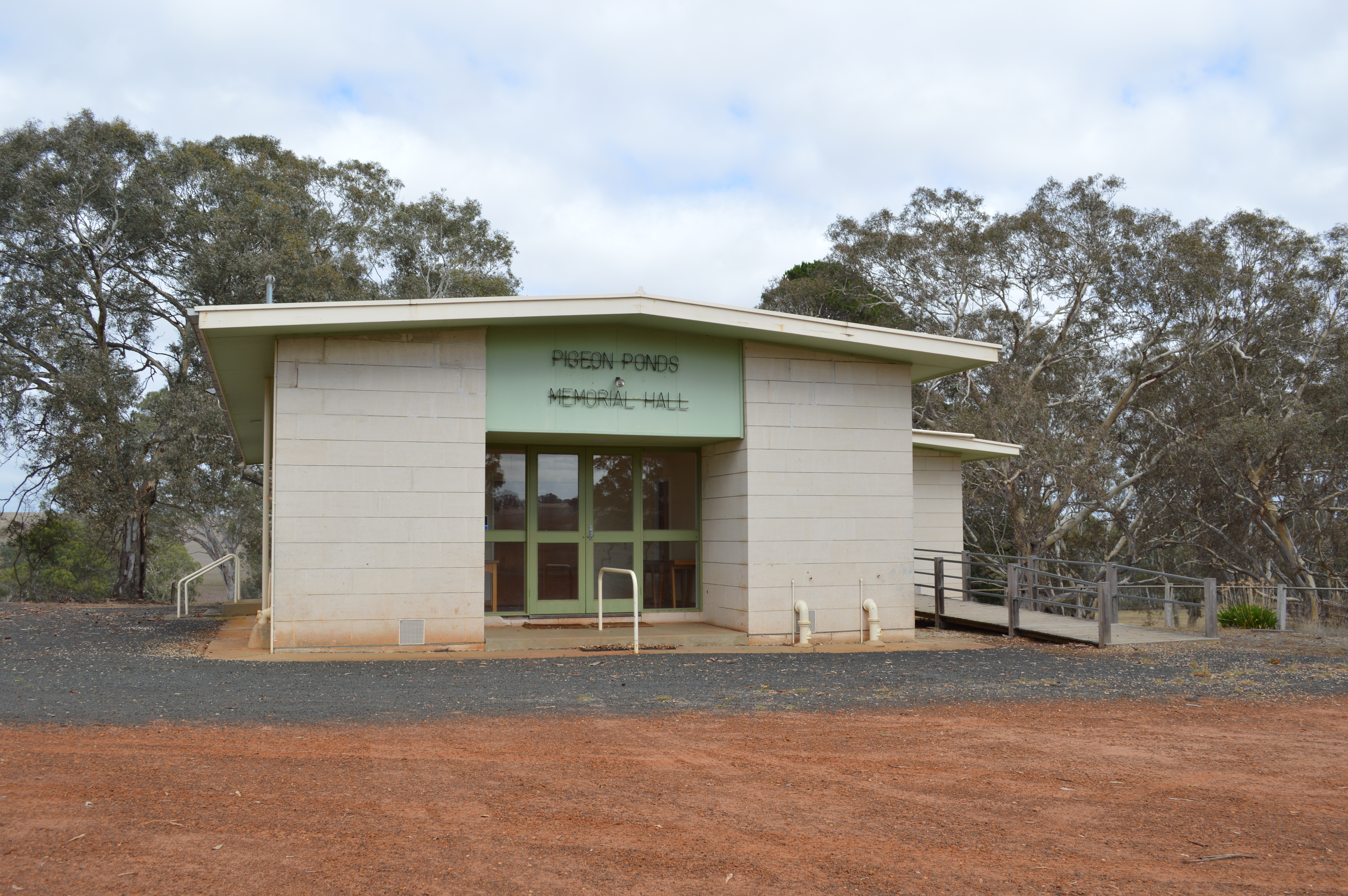
- Memorial hall, Pigeon Ponds

- Coordinates: 37°18′S 141°40′E
- Country: Australia
- State: Victoria
- LGA: Shire of Southern Grampians
- Location: 353 km (219 mi) W of Melbourne; 71 km (44 mi) NW of Hamilton; 20 km (12 mi) W of Balmoral

Government
  - State electorate: Lowan
  - Federal division: Wannon

Population
  - Total: 29 (2021 census)
- Postcode: 3407
Localities around Pigeon Ponds
Culla	Harrow	Balmoral
Tarrayoukyan	Pigeon Ponds	Englefield
Nareen	Coojar	Brit Brit

Pigeon Ponds is a locality in south west Victoria, Australia. The locality is in the Shire of Southern Grampians, on the Coleraine-Edenhope Road, 353 kilometres (219 mi) west of the state capital, Melbourne.

At the 2021 Census, Pigeon Ponds had a population of 29.

Pigeon Ponds have a cricket club with men's, women's and junior teams playing in the Hamilton District Cricket Association. They also have a tennis club which play in the South Arapiles Tennis Association.
