= Konongwootong =

Konongwootong Victoria
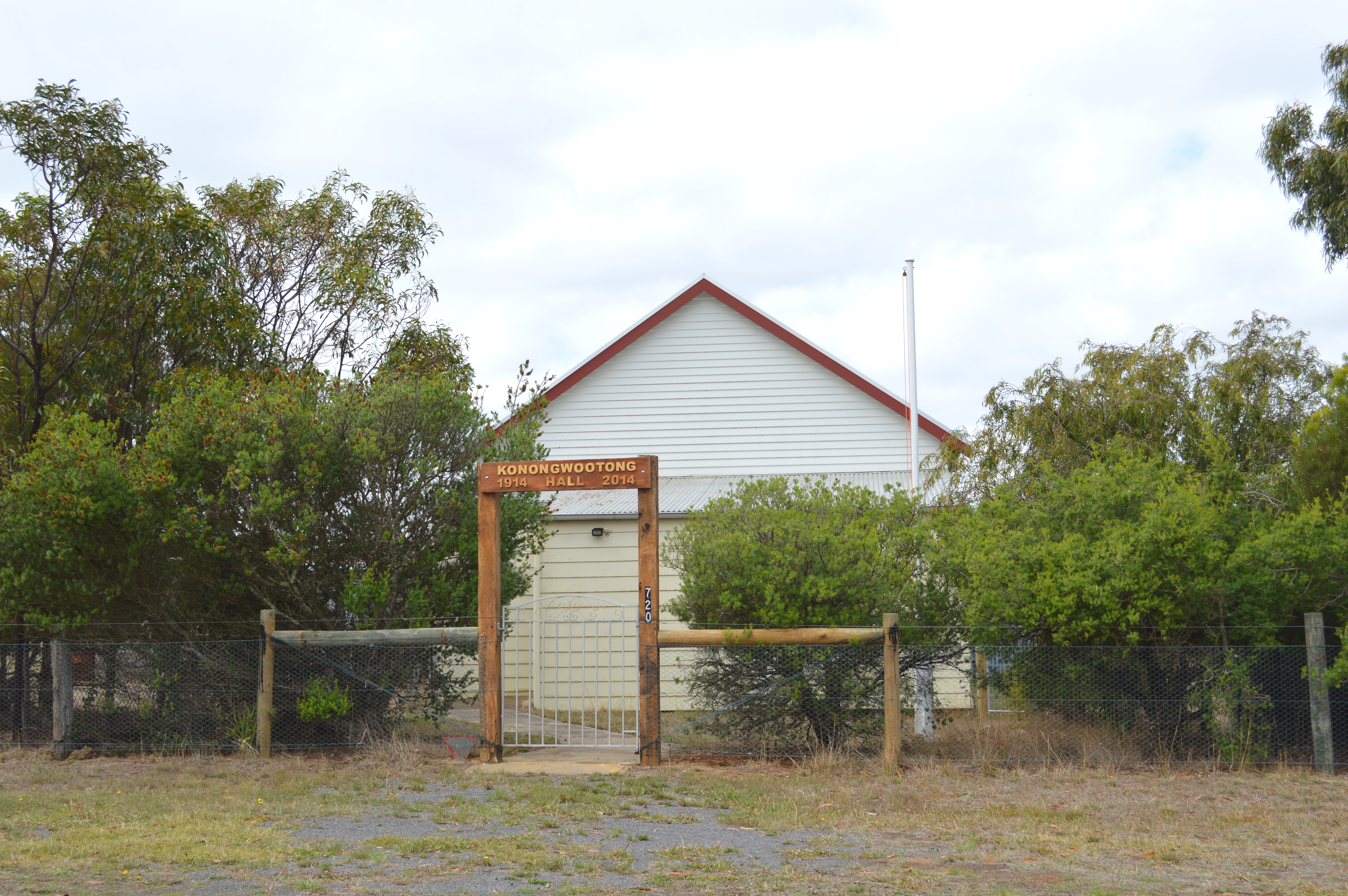
- Public hall, Konongwootong

- Coordinates: 37°32′S 141°41′E
- Population: 36 (2016 census)
- Postcode(s): 3315
- Location: 342 km (213 mi) W of Melbourne; 46 km (29 mi) NW of Hamilton; 10 km (6 mi) N of Coleraine
- LGA(s): Shire of Southern Grampians
- State electorate(s): Lowan
- Federal division(s): Wannon

Konongwootong is a locality in south-west Victoria, Australia. It is in the Shire of Southern Grampians, on the Coleraine-Edenhope Road, 342 kilometres (213 mi) west of the state capital, Melbourne.

At the 2016 census, Konongwootong had a population of 50.
