= Adam Campbell (Australian footballer) =

Australian rules footballer (born 1985)

Personal information
- Born: 25 January 1985 (age 41); Christchurch, New Zealand
- Original team: North Ballarat Rebels (TAC Cup)
- Debut: Round 10, 3 June 2006, Fremantle vs. Richmond, at Subiaco Oval
- Height: 194 cm (6 ft 4 in)
- Weight: 90 kg (198 lb)
- Position: Forward

Playing career^{1}
Years	Club	Games (Goals)
2006–2009	Fremantle	13 (13)
- ^{1} Playing statistics correct to the end of 2009.

Adam Campbell (born 25 January 1985) is a former Australian rules footballer for the Fremantle Football Club in the Australian Football League (AFL). He played both centre half-forward and full forward.

== Early life ==
Coming from a rugby union background in the city of Christchurch, Campbell represented Mid Canterbury in rugby at junior level before moving to Australia at age 16 and the town of Hamilton where he began playing Aussie rules in 2001, quickly proving a standout talent in country football before playing full forward at the North Ballarat Rebels.

Nominated as the overall No. 27 selection at the 2003 national draft as a key position prospect, Campbell spent the 2004 and 2005 seasons as a development player at West Perth in the West Australian Football League (WAFL).

== AFL career ==
Campbell made his AFL debut in Round 10, 2006 against Richmond, but it would be his only appearance for Fremantle in the year, with Ryan Murphy being preferred as the second key forward behind Matthew Pavlich.

2007 saw Campbell perform well during the pre-season and he has been selected for a further four games, included Round 7 against Hawthorn at Subiaco Oval, where Campbell scored a career high four goals.

A knee injury in round 13 sidelined him for a few games.

From round 19 2007, Campbell returned and found some excellent form, kicking multiple goals in several games.

In 2008, Campbell managed just fives games, but showed signs of improvement, increasing his averages for marks, kicks and goals. However injuries struck and he spent most of the season sidelined or playing in the WAFL. In 2009, Campbell once again suffered knee injuries in the pre-season.

Campbell was delisted from Fremantle at the end of the 2009 season.

== Post AFL career ==
Campbell joined WAFL club Subiaco for season 2010. He then moved to Sydney to play NEAFL with Sydney University from 2011 to 2014.

Campbell returned to Victoria in 2015 where he signed with St. Bernards Old Collegians in the VAFA. He then became an assistant with VFL side Coburg for season 2016.

Campbell has served as a councillor for the Shire of Southern Grampians since 2024, having been elected at the 2024 Victorian local elections.
