= Cavendish, Victoria =

Cavendish
- Town
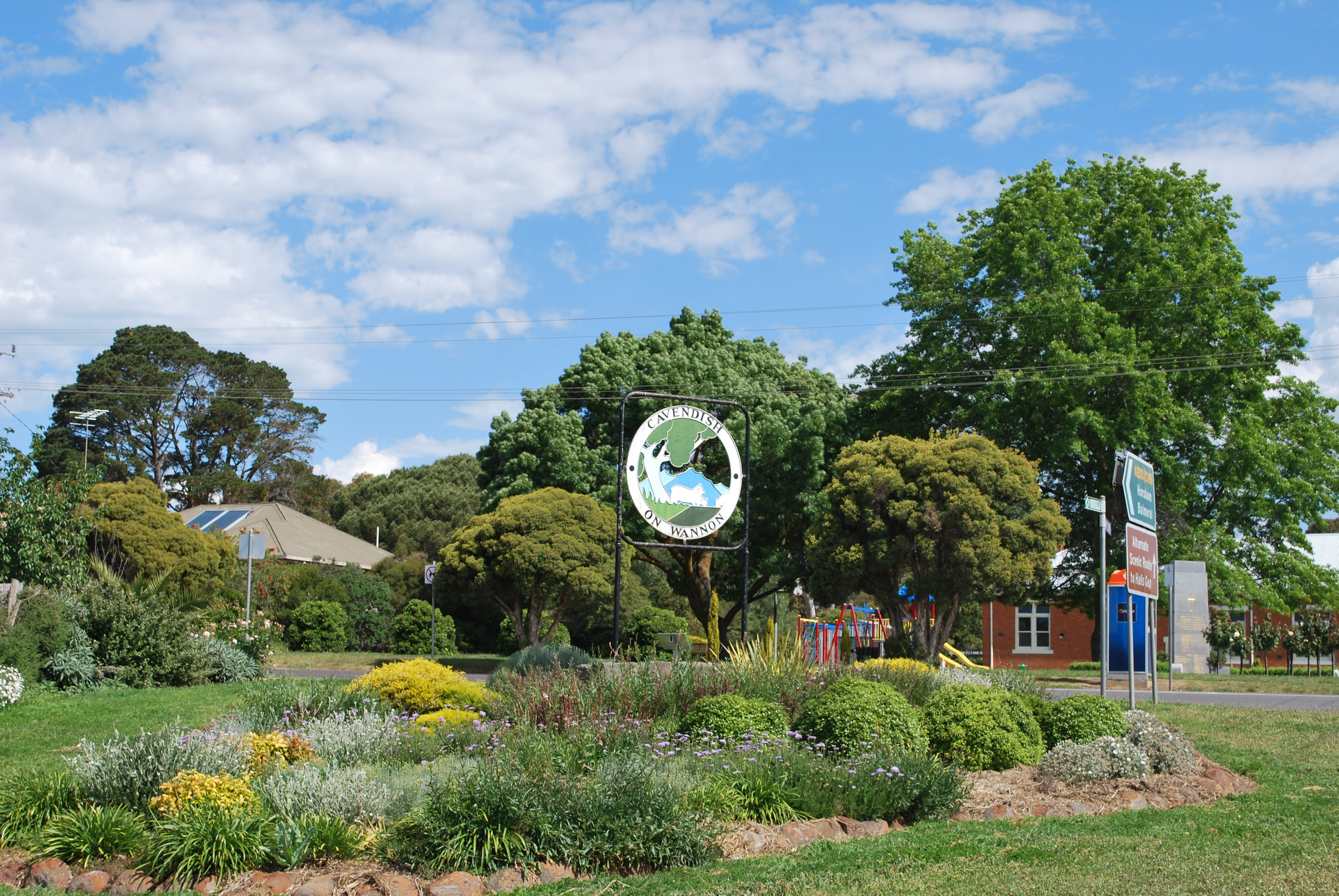
- Sign and a small garden at Cavendish

- Coordinates: 37°31′38″S 142°02′24″E
- Country: Australia
- State: Victoria
- LGA: Shire of Southern Grampians
- Location: 295 km (183 mi) W of Melbourne; 26 km (16 mi) N of Hamilton

Government
  - State electorate: Lowan
  - Federal division: Wannon

Population
  - Total: 366 (2021 census)
- Postcode: 3314

Cavendish is a township in the Shire of Southern Grampians in the Western District of Victoria, Australia, on the Wannon River. At the 2021 census, Cavendish and the surrounding area had a population of 366, having declined from 454 fifteen years prior.

The township was settled in the early 1850s, the Post Office opening on 1 April 1853. A railway line linking the town to Hamilton was opened on 2 November 1915 and closed on 1 July 1979.

The mobile library from Hamilton makes regular visits, and there is also a Men's Shed. The local pub, The Bunyip Hotel is situated on the banks of the Wannon River. The Bridge Cafe is also a small general store, with gas bottle exchange available, and clean and welcoming dine-in facilities. There is a walk (Settlers Walk) along the Wannon River, with views of waterbirds and other birds, as well as sheep, which, along with cattle, are a major local industry.

Four churches service the community. There is also a caravan/camping area, a police station, and some accommodation. The town has a kindergarten and a primary school. It has a football team playing in the South West District Football League. Former AFL player Shannon Watt is from Cavendish but played football for Hamilton.
