= Balmoral, Victoria =

Balmoral
- Town
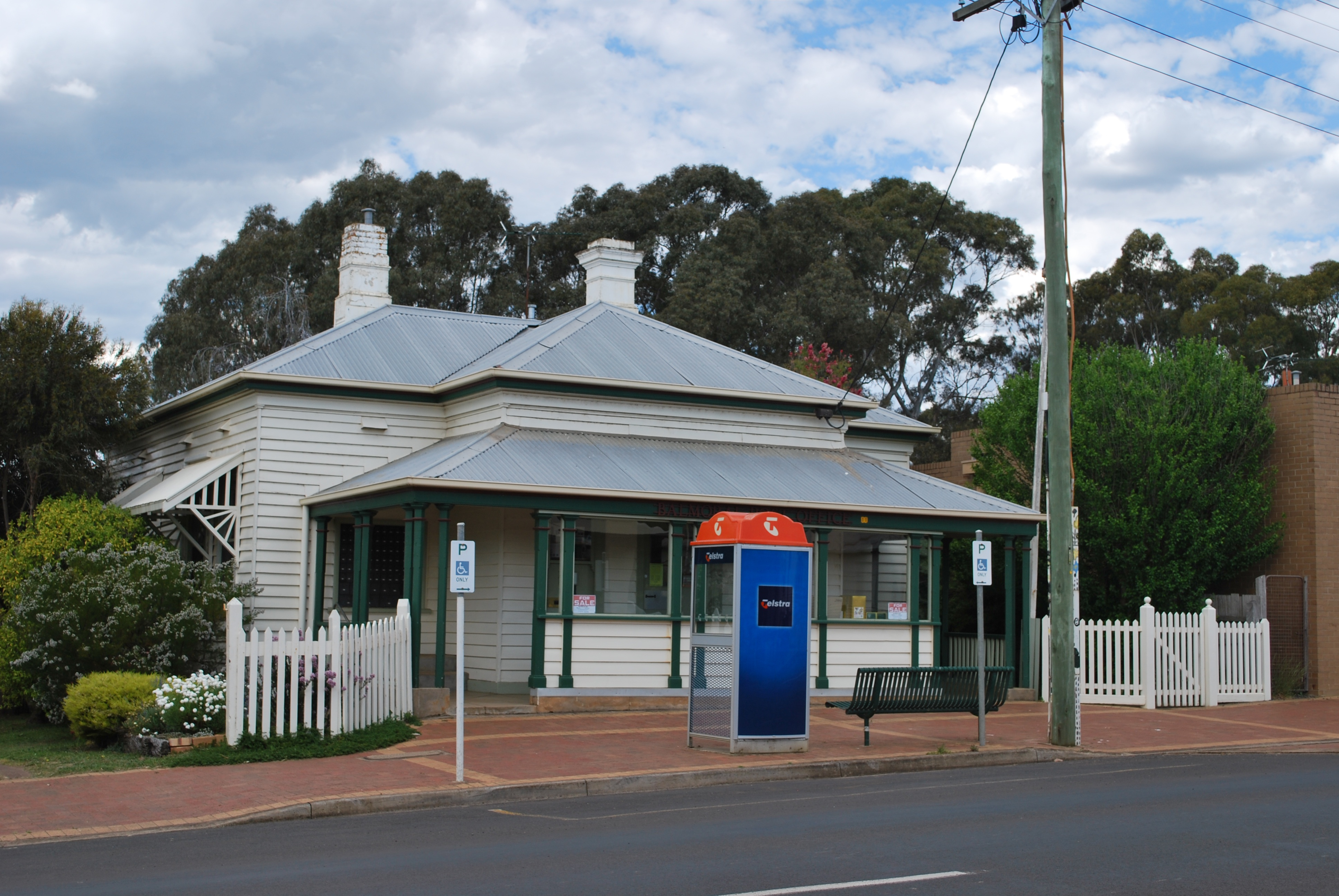
- Balmoral post office

- Coordinates: 37°15′S 141°51′E
- Country: Australia
- State: Victoria
- LGA: Shire of Southern Grampians
- Location: 334 km (208 mi) NW of Melbourne; 78 km (48 mi) SW of Horsham; 64 km (40 mi) N of Hamilton; 48 km (30 mi) N of Coleraine; 30 km (19 mi) SE of Harrow

Government
  - State electorate: Lowan
  - Federal division: Wannon

Population
  - Total: 294 (2016 census)
- Postcode: 3407
Localities around Balmoral
Harrow	Kanagulk	Telangatuk East
Pigeon Ponds	Balmoral	Rocklands
Coojar	Englefield	Vasey

Balmoral is a town in the Shire of Southern Grampians in the Western District of Victoria, Australia. At the 2016 census, Balmoral and the surrounding area had a population of 294.

Johnny Mullagh the great cricketer was born nearby.

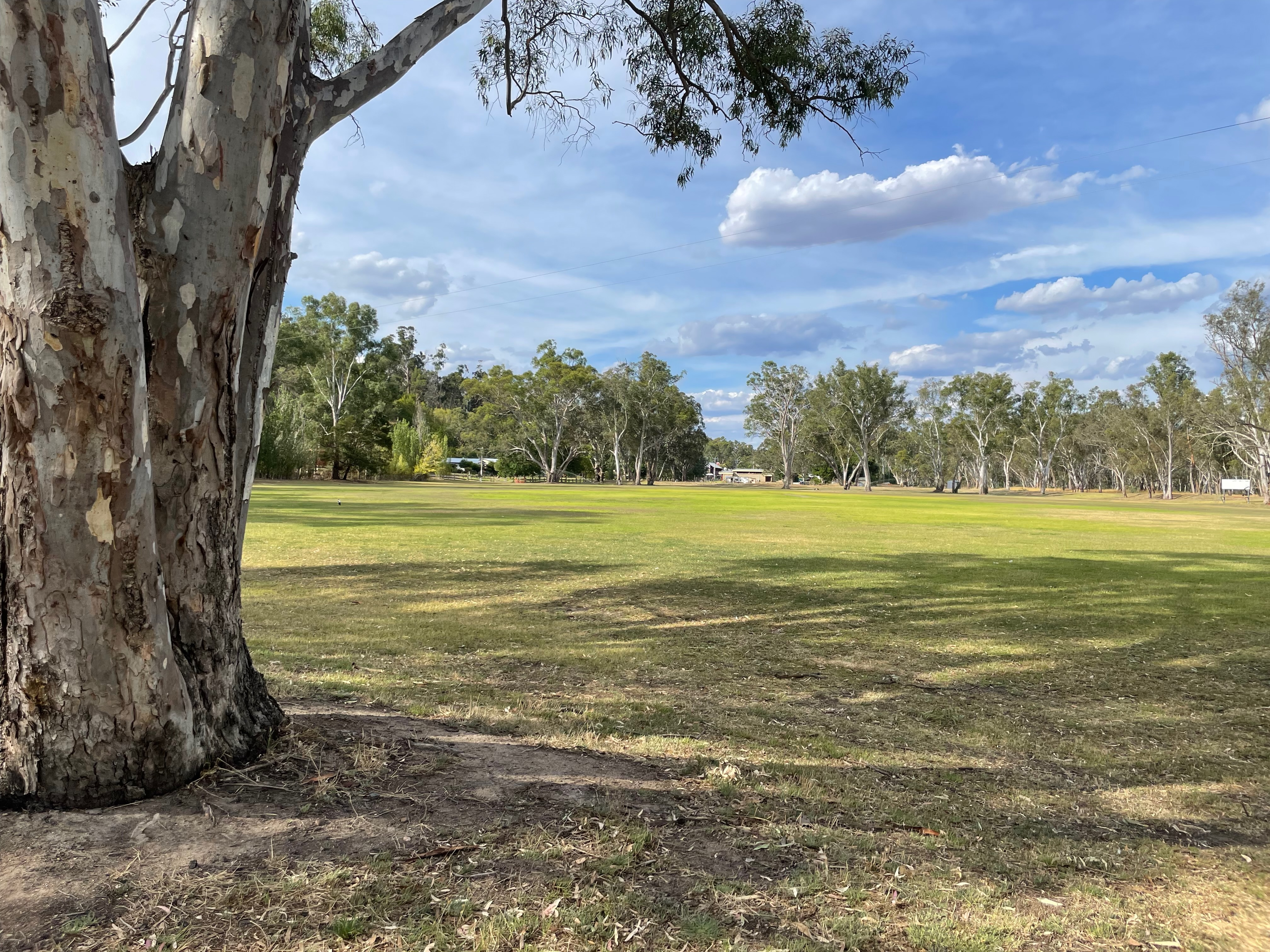
Johnny Mullagh Oval, Harrow

The township was settled in the early 1850s, the Post Office opening on 31 October 1855.

A railway line, built in a number of sections, once connected Horsham and Hamilton, running via Cavendish, Balmoral and East Natimuk. The railway closed 1 July 1979 with the majority of the railway track being removed, though several rail bridges remain in place.

The Balmoral Magistrates' Court closed on 1 November 1981, not having been visited by a Magistrate since 1971.

The town in conjunction with neighbouring township Harrow has an Australian Rules football and netball club competing in the Horsham & District Football League.

Golfers play at the Balmoral Golf Club on Rocklands Road.

The Douglas Mine owned by Iluka Resources, which operated from 2006 to 2012 is located nearby.

The Australian Broadcasting Corporation (ABC) released a series of its investigative program Background Briefing titled Hometown Boys, which examined the case of two men from Balmoral, Shaun Bloomfield and Luke Merryfull, who were convicted and sentenced on rape charges. The program reported that some members of the local community expressed support for the men and their families following the court proceedings.
