= Shire of Southern Grampians =

Coordinates: 37°31′00″S 142°02′00″E

- Local government area
- Location in Victoria

- Interactive map of Shire of Southern Grampians
- Country: Australia
- State: Victoria
- Region: Barwon South West
- Established: 1994
- Council seat: Hamilton

Government
  - Mayor: Cr Dennis Heslin
  - State electorate: Lowan
  - Federal division: Wannon

Area
  - Total: 6,654 km^{2} (2,569 sq mi)

Population
  - Total: 16,135 (2018)
  - Density: 2.42486/km^{2} (6.2804/sq mi)
- Gazetted: 23 September 1994
- Website: Shire of Southern Grampians
LGAs around Shire of Southern Grampians
West Wimmera	Horsham	Northern Grampians
Glenelg	Shire of Southern Grampians	Ararat
Glenelg	Moyne	Moyne

The Shire of Southern Grampians is a local government area (LGA) in the Barwon South West region of Victoria, Australia, located in the south-western part of the state. It covers an area of 6,654 square kilometres (2,569 mi^{2}) and in June 2018 had a population of 16,135. It includes the city of Hamilton and the towns of Coleraine, Dunkeld and Penshurst.

The Shire is governed and administered by the Southern Grampians Shire Council; its seat of local government and administrative centre is located at the council headquarters in Hamilton, it also has service centres located in a couple of other locations within Hamilton. The Shire is named after the major geographical feature in the region, The Grampians, and that the southern part of this feature occupies the northern part of the LGA.

== History ==
The traditional owners of this shire are the Gunditjmara, Tjap Wurrung and Bunganditj people.

The Shire of Southern Grampians was formed in 1994 from the amalgamation of the City of Hamilton, Shire of Wannon, the vast bulk of the Shire of Mount Rouse and Shire of Dundas, and small parts of the Shire of Kowree and Shire of Heywood.

The creation of the Shire was strongly supported by the councils of the City of Hamilton and the Shires of Wannon, Dundas and Mount Rouse. The four municipalities were eager to amalgamate, as they were already collaborating in a range of areas including library services, health, water, waste disposal and weights and measures. At public meetings held in the respective towns, Branxholme residents voted to join Southern Grampians, while Caramut and Macarthur residents chose to join the Shire of Moyne.

The Shire of Wannon suggested the name "Southern Grampians Council" for the combined entity. The Local Government Board initially planned to call the amalgamated municipality the "Shire of Napier" (after Mount Napier), but the four councils expressed their preference for "Southern Grampians", a suggestion the Board ultimately adopted.

In January 1996, about 180 km^{2} of farmland west and south-west of Wickliffe was transferred from Southern Grampians to the Rural City of Ararat and the Shire of Moyne after a further Local Government Board review.

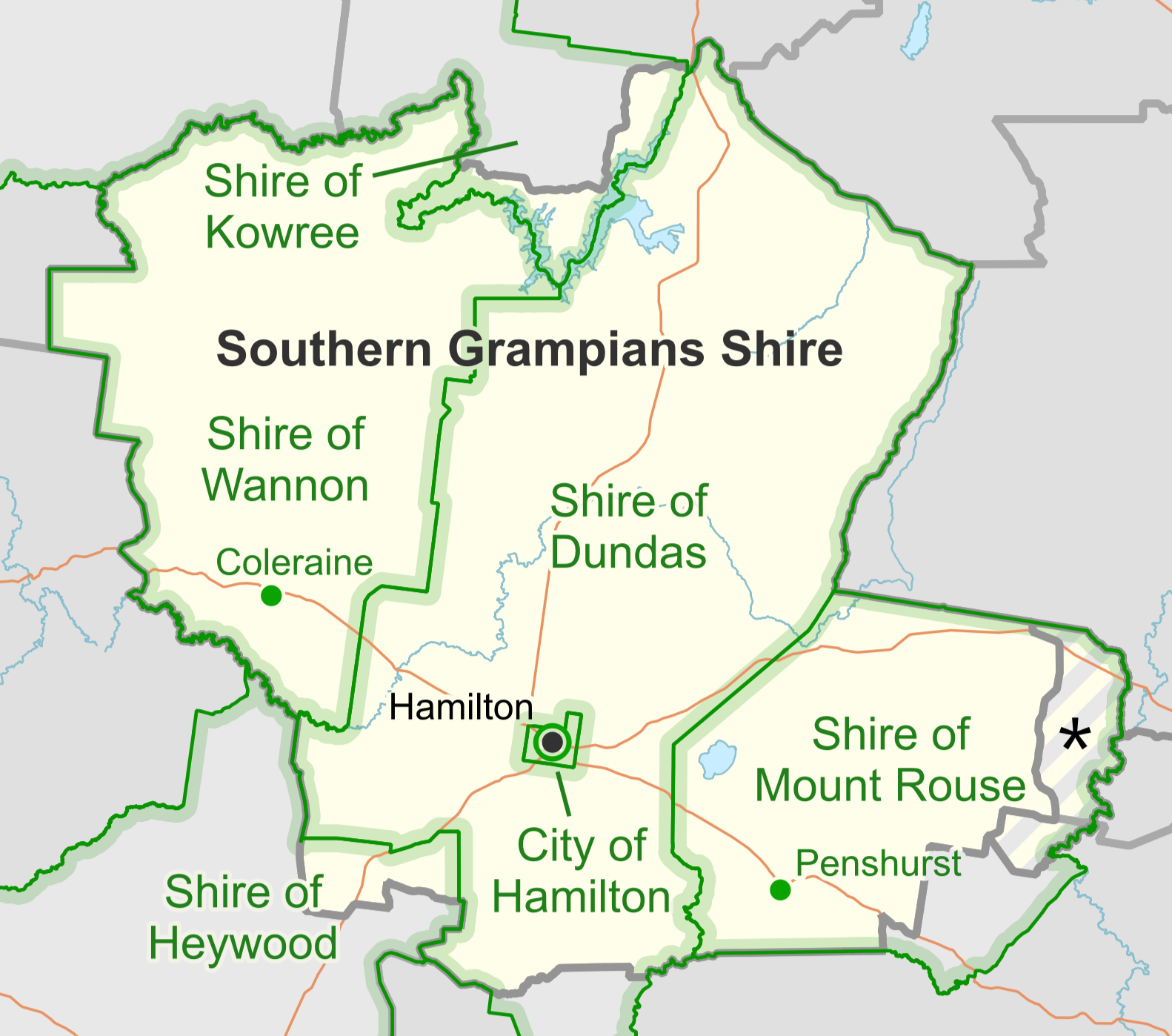
Southern Grampians Shire's predecessor LGAs (green) as they were in 1994. The administrative centres of the former LGAs are marked by green dots. 🞲 Area transferred out of Southern Grampians Shire in 1996

== Council ==
=== Current composition ===
The council is composed of seven councillors elected to represent an unsubdivided municipality. Council composition as of May 2026:

Party	Councillor	Term	Notes
Independent	Dennis Heslin	2024–present	Mayor
Independent	Adam Campbell	2024–present	
Independent	Helen Henry	2020–present	
Independent	Jayne Manning	2024–present	
Independent	Afton Barber	2024–present	
Independent	Katrina Rainsford	2004–present	
Animal Justice	Tamasyn Ramsay-Grounds	2026–present	

=== Administration and governance ===
The council meets in the council chambers at the council headquarters in the Hamilton Municipal Offices, which is also the location of the council's administrative activities. It also provides customer services at both its administrative centre on Brown Street in Hamilton, and its service centre in Roberts St in Hamilton.

== Townships and localities ==
The 2021 census recorded the shire population at 16,588, compared to 15,944 in the 2016 census.

Population
Locality	2016	2021
Balmoral	294	281
Bellfield	1,793	1,996
Bochara	81	84
Branxholme^	351	304
Brit Brit	39	42
Buckley Swamp	25	21
Bulart	93	104
Byaduk^	123	129
Byaduk North	119	134
Caramut^	246	256
Carapook^	70	67
Cavendish	334	366
Cherrypool^	3	3
Clover Flat^	17	15
Coleraine	1,029	1,062
Coojar	38	38
Croxton East	70	70
Culla	35	31
Dunkeld^	678	688
Englefield	23	23
Gatum	29	35
Gazette^	43	42
Glenisla^	16	23
Glenthompson^	232	256
Grampians	0	0
Gringegalgona	21	44
Gritjurk	55	61
Hamilton	9,974	10,346
Harrow^	200	184
Hensley Park	59	75
Hilgay	19	29
Karabeal	30	29
Konongwootong	50	60
Melville Forest	42	63
Mirranatwa	26	31
Mooralla	83	79
Morgiana	31	29
Mount Napier	17	16
Moutajup	83	108
Muntham^	31	29
Nareeb^	36	48
Nareen^	93	79
Penshurst^	622	677
Pigeon Ponds	29	29
Purdeet^	14	21
Rocklands	14	25
Strathkellar	93	84
Tabor	39	38
Tahara^	36	30
Tarrayoukyan^	21	25
Tarrenlea	37	25
Tarrington	301	328
Vasey	49	45
Victoria Point	17	16
Victoria Valley	79	65
Wando Vale^	104	96
Wannon	108	124
Warrayure	24	50
Woodhouse	39	34
Wootong Vale	46	32
Yatchaw	26	35
Yulecart	127	128

^ - Territory divided with another LGA

== See also ==
- List of places of worship in Southern Grampians Shire
- List of localities (Victoria)
