= Shire of Ararat =

Coordinates: 37°20′S 142°48′E

- Local government area
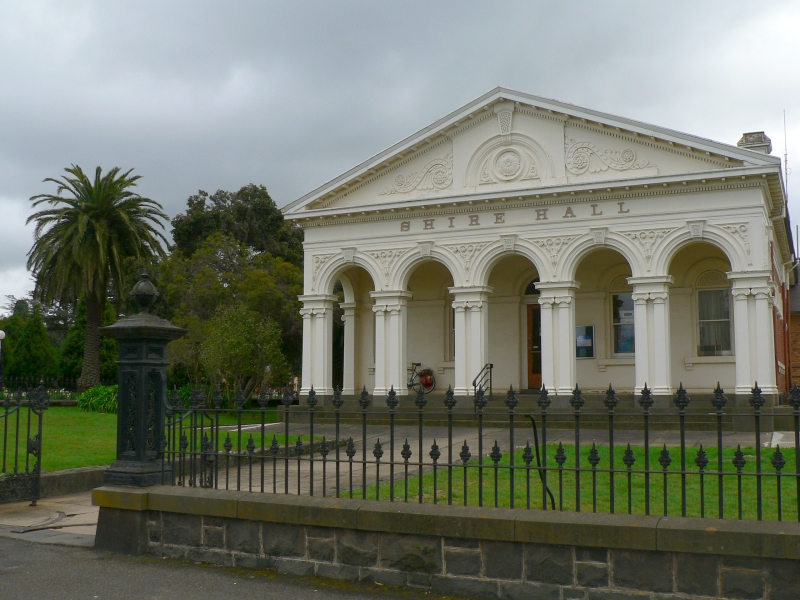
- Former Shire Hall. Barkly Street, Ararat

- The Shire of Ararat as at its dissolution in 1994
- Country: Australia
- State: Victoria
- Region: Grampians
- Established: 1861
- Council seat: Ararat

Area
  - Total: 3,657.06 km^{2} (1,412.00 sq mi)

Population
  - Total(s): 4,490 (1992)
  - Density: 1.2278/km^{2} (3.180/sq mi)
- County: Ripon, Borung
LGAs around Shire of Ararat
| Stawell | Stawell | Avoca; Lexton |
| Dundas | Shire of Ararat | Ripon |
| Mount Rouse | Mortlake | Hampden |

The Shire of Ararat was a local government area about 200 kilometres (124 mi) west-northwest of Melbourne, the state capital of Victoria, Australia. The shire covered an area of 3,657.06 square kilometres (1,412.0 sq mi), and existed from 1861 until 1994. The shire did not cover the town of Ararat, which was managed by a separate local government authority.

== History ==
Ararat was first incorporated as a road district on 27 August 1861, and became a shire on 8 March 1864. Parts of its North Riding were annexed to the Shire of Stawell on 26 October 1926, while other portions were annexed to the City of Ararat on 1 October 1941 and 27 May 1960.

On 23 September 1994, the Shire of Ararat was abolished, and along with the City of Ararat and parts of the Shire of Stawell, was merged into the newly created Rural City of Ararat.

== Wards ==
The Shire of Ararat was divided into four ridings, each of which elected three councillors:

- North Riding
- South Riding
- East Riding
- West Riding

== Towns and localities ==
- Buangor
- Dunneworthy
- Elmhurst
- Lake Bolac
- Mafeking
- Maroona
- Mininera
- Moyston
- Norval
- Pomonal
- Rossbridge
- Streatham
- Tatyoon
- Warrak
- Westmere
- Wickliffe
- Willaura
- Yalla-y-Poora

== Population ==
| Year | Population |
|---|---|
| 1954 | 4,659 |
| 1958 | 4,940* |
| 1961 | 4,600 |
| 1966 | 4,641 |
| 1971 | 4,178 |
| 1976 | 4,134 |
| 1981 | 4,135 |
| 1986 | 4,230 |
| 1991 | 4,278 |

* Estimate in the 1958 Victorian Year Book.
