= List of places of worship in the Rural City of Ararat =

This is a list of places of worship in the Rural City of Ararat, a local government area in the state of Victoria, Australia. The list includes active and former churches and other religious buildings representing a variety of Christian denominations and other faiths.

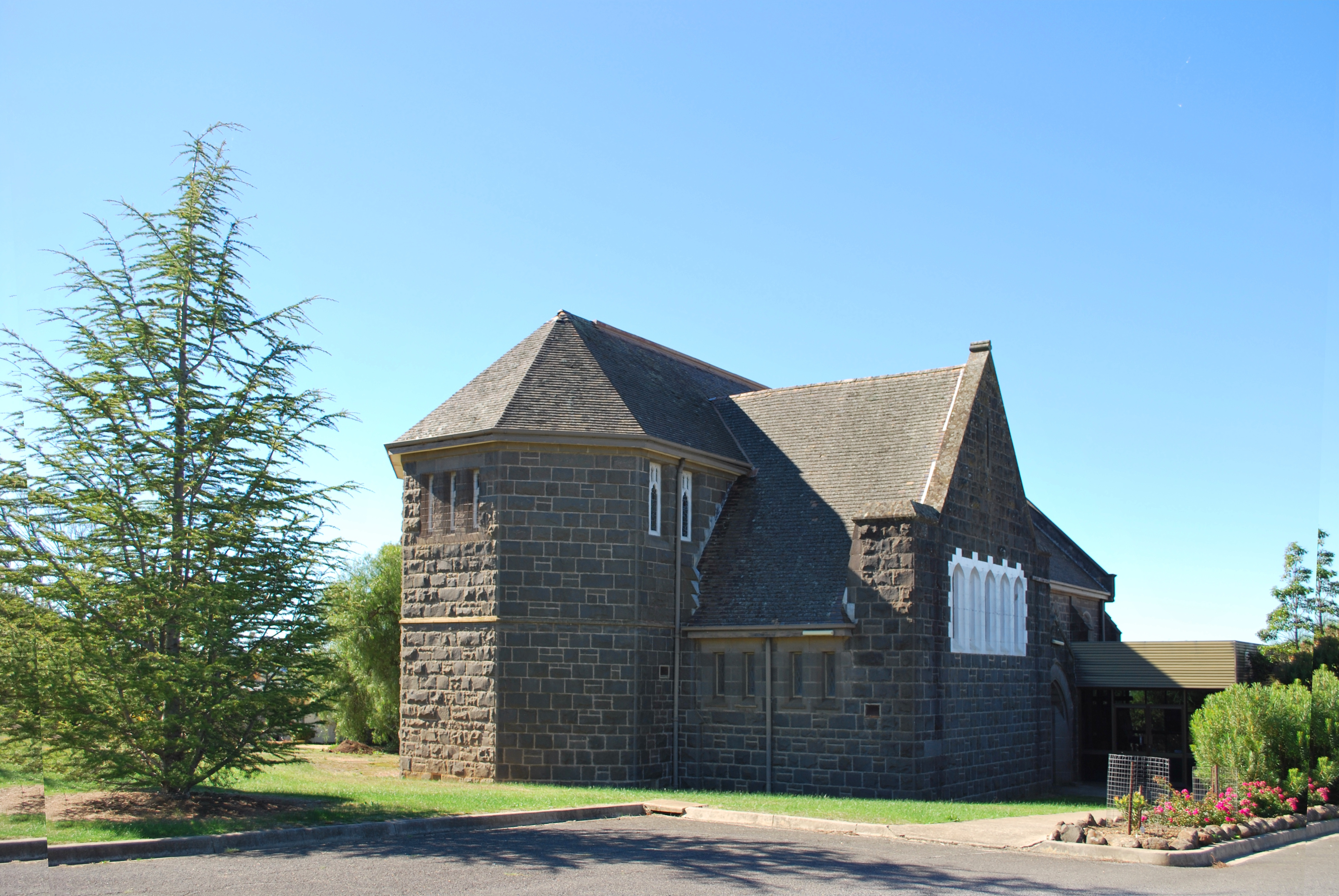
Holy Trinity Anglican Church, Ararat

== Heritage listing status ==
Style	Status
Yes	Listed on the Victorian Heritage Register
–	Not listed

== Current places of worship ==
Current places of worship
Name	Image	Location	Denomination/ Affiliation	Heritage listing	Notes	Refs
Ararat West Uniting Church		Ararat; 37.279225°S 142.919824°E	Uniting	–		
Ararat Church of Christ		Ararat; 37.283145°S 142.935935°E	Church of Christ	–		
Ararat Community Church		Ararat; 37.284615°S 142.933705°E	Baptist	–		
Ararat Christian Assembly Church		Ararat; 37.286218°S 142.920480°E	Christian Assemblies International	–		
St Andrew's Uniting Church, Ararat		Ararat; 37.283996°S 142.937193°E	Uniting (formerly Presbyterian)	–		
Immaculate Conception Catholic Church		Ararat; 37.284779°S 142.938531°E	Catholic	–		
St Paul's Lutheran Church		Ararat; 37.283530°S 142.938744°E	Lutheran	–		
Holy Trinity Anglican Church, Ararat		Ararat; 37.282674°S 142.926389°E	Anglican	Yes		
The Olive Branch		Ararat; 37.281215°S 142.934312°E	Church of Christ	–		
St John's Uniting Church, Streatham		Streatham; 37.678610°S 143.061591°E	Uniting (formerly Presbyterian)	Yes		
Willaura Uniting Church		Willaura; 37.545422°S 142.740435°E	Uniting (formerly Presbyterian)	–		
St Mark's Anglican Church, Elmhurst		Elmhurst; 37.176243°S 143.248554°E	Anglican	–		
Pomonal Community Church		Pomonal; 37.191721°S 142.607823°E	Uniting	–		
St Bernard's Catholic Church		Lake Bolac; 37.721888°S 142.837406°E	Catholic	–		

== Former places of worship ==
Former places of worship
Name	Image	Location	Denomination/ Affiliation	Heritage listing	Notes	Refs
St Columba's Memorial Catholic Church		Streatham; 37.678589°S 143.060216°E	Catholic	Yes		
Wickliffe Uniting Church		Wickliffe; 37.690543°S 142.724222°E	Uniting (formerly Presbyterian)	Yes		
St John's Anglican Church, Westmere		Westmere; 37.688747°S 142.967866°E	Anglican	–		
All Saints' Anglican Church, Willaura		Willaura; 37.546590°S 142.744024°E	Anglican	–		
St Patrick's Catholic Church, Willaura		Willaura; 37.547134°S 142.738545°E	Catholic	–		
St John's Lutheran Church, Willaura		Willaura; 37.541981°S 142.736320°E	Lutheran	–		
Tatyoon Uniting Church		Tatyoon; 37.522650°S 142.943529°E	Uniting (formerly Presbyterian)	–		
Christ Church, Moyston		Moyston; 37.301411°S 142.764256°E	Anglican	–		
Moyston Presbyterian Church		Moyston; 37.304782°S 142.766072°E	Presbyterian	–		
Moyston Methodist Church		Moyston; 37.304556°S 142.766874°E	Methodist	–		
Elmhurst Uniting Church		Elmhurst; 37.178474°S 143.247077°E	Uniting	–		
Sacred Heart Catholic Church		Rossbridge; 37.485950°S 142.848421°E	Catholic	Yes		
Scots Uniting Church		Lake Bolac; 37.716001°S 142.837823°E	Uniting (formerly Presbyterian)	–		
St Mark's Anglican Church, Lake Bolac		Lake Bolac; 37.715575°S 142.839289°E	Anglican	–		
St Joseph's Catholic Church, Buangor		Buangor; 37.365948°S 143.175807°E	Catholic	–		

== See also ==
- List of places of worship in Golden Plains Shire
- List of places of worship in the City of Greater Geelong
