= List of places on the Victorian Heritage Register in the Rural City of Ararat =

This is a list of places on the Victorian Heritage Register in the Rural City of Ararat in Victoria, Australia. The Victorian Heritage Register is maintained by the Heritage Council of Victoria.

The Victorian Heritage Register, as of 2020, lists the following 16 state-registered places within the Rural City of Ararat:

Place name	Place #	Location	Suburb or Town	Co-ordinates	Built	State registered	Photo
Aradale Mental Hospital	H1223	McLellan St	Ararat	37.279440°S 142.958840°E	1864-67	20 August 1982	
Ararat Civic Precinct	H2286	193-239 Barkly St	Ararat	37.283490°S 142.933470°E	1871	8 September 2011	
Ararat Court House	H1657	63-75 Barkly St	Ararat	37.284190°S 142.927190°E	1866-67	20 August 1982	
Ararat Locomotive Depot and Turntable	H1093	Ararat Railway Complex, High St	Ararat	37.281120°S 142.949320°E	1928	14 September 1995	
Cobb & Co Staging Stables	H0259	6660 Western Hwy	Buangor	37.366080°S 143.174160°E	c. 1860	9 October 1974	
Gorrin Woolshed	H0260	773 Old Geelong Rd	Dobie	37.344080°S 143.043330°E	c. 1867	9 October 1974	
Hard Hill Mining Site	H1044	Garden Gully Rd and Hard Hill Rd	Armstrong and Great Western	37.192220°S 142.867310°E	1856	1 December 1994	
J Ward	H1067	1-7 Girdlestone St	Ararat	37.278570°S 142.930310°E	1860-63	20 August 1982	
Kozminsky's Mill and Log Chute	H2018	Mount Buangor State Park	Bayindeen and Raglan	37.307960°S 143.231300°E	1876	20 March 2003	
Lexington Homestead	H0258	274 Moyston-Great Western Rd	Moyston	37.277570°S 142.788300°E	c. 1851	9 October 1974	
Midland Theatre	H2228	250 Barkly St	Ararat	37.284380°S 142.934410°E	1938	3 December 2009	
Narrapumelap	H0492	153 Narrapumelap Rd	Wickliffe	37.703830°S 142.711340°E	1873-78	4 May 1981	
Old Ararat Sub-Treasury and Post Office	H0618	91 Barkly St	Ararat	37.284120°S 142.927730°E	1861	19 February 1986	
Pyrenees House	H1688	9-59 Girdlestone St	Ararat	37.279350°S 142.932630°E	1886	20 August 1982	
Signal Box A and Signal Posts	H1094	Ararat Railway Complex, High St	Ararat	37.282450°S 142.937400°E	1891	14 September 1995	
St John's Uniting Church	H0257	38 Campbell St	Streatham	37.678660°S 143.061590°E	1875	9 October 1974	
