= Glenelg Highway =

Glenelg Highway Victoria–South Australia
- Coordinates: 37.850895°S 140.852153°E (West end); 37.585148°S 143.840849°E (East end)

General information
- Type: Highway
- Length: 299.8 km (186 mi)
- Gazetted: November 1914 (as Main Road); 1947/48 (as State Highway)
- Route number(s): B160 (1998–present)
- Former route number: State Route 112 (1986–1998)

Major junctions
- West end: Princes Highway; Glenburnie, South Australia
- Henty Highway; Hamilton Highway; Pyrenees Highway
- East end: Midland Highway; Sebastopol, Ballarat

Location(s)
- Region: Limestone Coast, Grampians
- Major settlements: Casterton, Coleraine, Hamilton, Dunkeld, Glenthompson, Lake Bolac, Skipton

Highway system
- Highways in Australia; National Highway • Freeways in Australia; Highways in Victoria; Highways in South Australia

Glenelg Highway is a rural highway in south-eastern Australia, linking the major regional centres of Mount Gambier in south-eastern South Australia with Ballarat in western Victoria.

== Route ==
Glenelg Highway commences at the intersection with Princes Highway in Glenburnie, South Australia and heads on a north-easterly direction as a two-lane, single carriageway rural highway, crossing the interstate border into Victoria 15km later (some maps identify the South Australian section as Casterton Road), continuing northeast to Casterton, then heading in an easterly direction through the towns of Hamilton, Dunkeld and Skipton, before eventually terminating at the intersection with Midland Highway in the south-eastern suburb of Sebastopol in Ballarat.

== History ==
The passing of the Country Roads Act 1912 through the Parliament of Victoria provided for the establishment of the Country Roads Board (later VicRoads) and their ability to declare Main Roads, taking responsibility for the management, construction and care of the state's major roads from local municipalities. Hamilton- (Coleraine-) (Casterton-) Mount Gambier Road was declared a Main Road, from Hamilton to Coleraine on 16 November 1914, and Coleraine through Casterton to the border with South Australia on 30 November 1914; Hamilton-Dunkeld Road from Hamilton to Dunkeld was declared a Main Road on 16 November 1914; and Ballarat-Hamilton Road from south-western Ballarat through Scarsdale, Skipton to Lake Bolac was declared a Main Road on 31 May 1915.

The passing of the Highways and Vehicles Act 1924 provided for the declaration of State Highways, roads two-thirds financed by the State government through the Country Roads Board. Glenelg Highway was declared a State Highway in the 1947/48 financial year, from Ballarat via Skipton and Hamilton to Casterton (for a total of 149 miles), subsuming the original declarations of Hamilton-Coleraine-Casterton-Mount Gambier Road, Hamilton-Dunkeld Road and Ballarat-Hamilton Road as Main Roads.

The alignment of the highway through Ballarat was changed in June 1983: previously terminating at the intersection of Albert and Hertford Streets in Sebastopol, it was extended north 3 km along Albert Street, Skipton Street, and Doveton Street South to terminate at Sturt Street (Western Highway) in central Ballarat, only to be truncated back to its original terminus in Sebastopol in May 1990; the former alignment was subsumed into the Midland Highway, re-aligned to this route at the same time. A new bridge over Hopkins River in Wickcliffe was opened in 1996, replacing an older, flood-prone structure and the last on the highway with a timber deck, at a cost of $145,000, with bridge approaches costing $700,000.

Glenelg Highway was signed as State Route 112 between Glenburnie and Ballarat in 1986; with Victoria's conversion to the newer alphanumeric system in the late 1990s, this was replaced by route B160.

The passing of the Road Management Act 2004 granted the responsibility of overall management and development of Victoria's major arterial roads to VicRoads: in 2004, VicRoads re-declared the road as Glenelg Highway (Arterial #6670), beginning at the South Australian border and ending at Midland Highway in Sebastopol, Ballarat.

== Major intersections and towns ==
State	LGA	Location	km	mi	Destinations	Notes
South Australia	Grant	Glenburnie	0.0	0.0	Princes Highway (A1 west, east) – Portland, Mount Gambier; Attiwill Road (south) – Murrawa	Western terminus of highway and route B160
State border			15.3	9.5	South Australia – Victoria state border	
Victoria	Glenelg	Casterton	58.4	36.3	Casterton–Penola Road (C198) – Penola, Robe	
Victoria	Glenelg	Casterton	61.6	38.3	Casterton–Naracoorte Road (C211) – Naracoorte	
Victoria	Glenelg River		62.1	38.6	Bridge name unknown	
Victoria	Glenelg	Casterton	63.4	39.4	Portland–Casterton Road (C195) – Portland	
Victoria	Glenelg	Casterton	67.7	42.1	Casterton–Edenhope Road (C207 north) – Edenhope; Lodge Road (south) – Sandford	
Victoria	Southern Grampians	Coleraine	89.2	55.4	Coleraine–Balmoral Road (C203/C206) – Balmoral, Harrow, Nhill	
Victoria	Southern Grampians	Coleraine	90.7	56.4	Coleraine–Merino Road (C196) – Merino	
Victoria	Southern Grampians	Hamilton	121.5	75.5	Henty Highway (A200 north) – Horsham, Warracknabeal, Mildura	Concurrency with route A200
Victoria	Southern Grampians	Hamilton	123.8	76.9	Henty Highway (A200 south) – Heywood, Portland	Concurrency with route A200
Victoria	Southern Grampians	Hamilton	124.9	77.6	Lonsdale Street (west) – Hamilton; Thompson Street (south) – Hamilton	Roundabout
Victoria	Southern Grampians	Hamilton	126.3	78.5	Portland railway line	
Victoria	Southern Grampians	Hamilton	127.7	79.3	Hamilton Highway (B140) – Mortlake, Warrnambool, Geelong	
Victoria	Southern Grampians	Moutajup	148.3	92.1	Portland railway line	
Victoria	Southern Grampians	Dunkeld	152.9	95.0	Penshurst–Dunkeld Road (C178 north) – Penshurst, Warrnambool; Dunkeld–Cavendish Road (C188 south) – Cavendish, Balmoral	
Victoria	Southern Grampians	Dunkeld	156.1	97.0	Grampians Road (C216) – Halls Gap, Stawell	
Victoria	Southern Grampians	Glenthompson	174.6	108.5	Pyrenees Highway (B180) – Ararat, Avoca, Castlemaine	
Victoria	Southern Grampians	Glenthompson	175.7	109.2	Portland railway line	
Victoria	Hopkins River		192.2	119.4	Bridge name unknown	
Victoria	Ararat	Lake Bolac	203.0	126.1	Mortlake–Ararat Road (C148) – Mortlake, Ararat	
Victoria	Ararat	Westmere	215.1	133.7	Western SG railway line	
Victoria	Ararat	Streatham	223.5	138.9	Rossbridge–Streatham Road (C182) – Ararat	
Victoria	Fiery Creek		224.2	139.3	Bridge name unknown	
Victoria	Corangamite	Skipton	250.8	155.8	Skipton Road (C172) – Beaufort	Western terminus of concurrency with route C172
Victoria	Mount Emu Creek		251.2	156.1	Bridge name unknown	
Victoria	Corangamite	Skipton	251.3	156.2	Lismore–Skipton Road (C172) – Lismore	Eastern terminus of concurrency with route C172
Victoria	Corangamite	Skipton	251.8	156.5	Rokewood–Skipton Road (C143) – Rokewood, Geelong	
Victoria	Woady Yaloak River		278.4	173.0	Bridge name unknown	
Victoria	Golden Plains	Scarsdale	279.5	173.7	Lismore–Scarsdale Road (C171) – Lismore	
Victoria	Ballarat	Delacombe	297.1	184.6	Delacombe–Wendouree Road (C307 north) – Alfredton, Wendouree; Cherry Flat Road (south) – Bonshaw	
Victoria	Ballarat	Sebastopol	299.8	186.3	Midland Highway (A300 north, south) – Ballarat City Centre, Bendigo, Geelong; Sayle Street (east) – Sebastopol	Eastern terminus of highway and route B160
Concurrency terminus

== See also ==
- Highways in Australia
- List of highways in Victoria
