= Robert Francis Burns =

Irish-Australian murderer

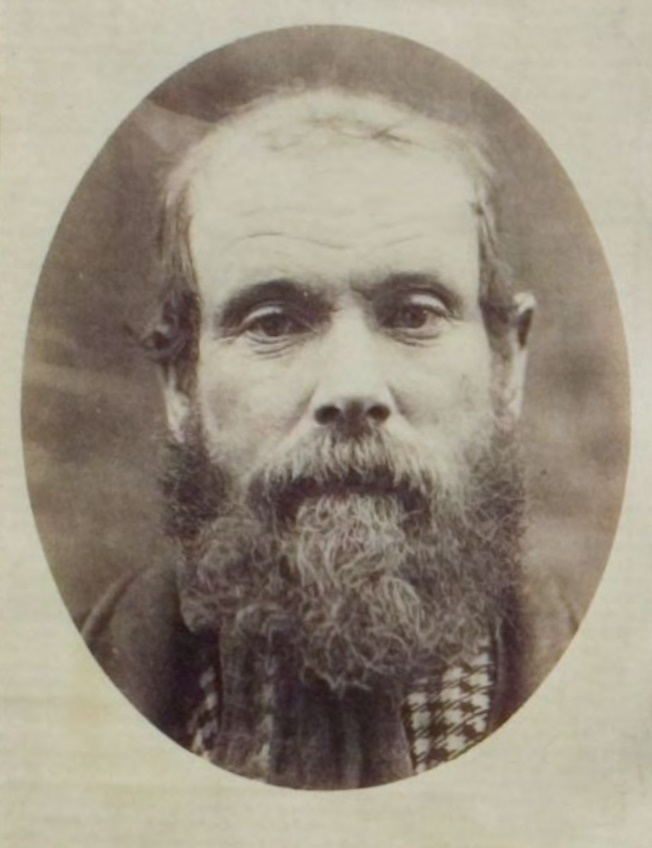
- Prisoner identification photograph
- Born: 1840; County Limerick, Ireland
- Died: 25 September 1883 (aged 43); HM Prison Ararat, Victoria
- Status: Executed by hanging
- Conviction: Murder
- Penalty: Death

Robert Francis Burns (1840 – 25 September 1883) was an Irish Australian murderer and probable serial killer. He was hanged at Ararat Gaol in September 1883, convicted of the murder of Michael Quinlivan near Wickliffe in western Victoria. After Burns's death the hangman made a sensational claim that the prisoner had stated to him, prior to the execution, that he had murdered eight people in total, five in Victoria and three in New South Wales. The revelation prompted speculation in the colonial press, attempting to identify other murder victims with whom Burns had been associated.

== Biography ==
=== Early life ===
Robert Francis Burns was born in 1840 in County Limerick in Ireland.

=== Emigration and marriage ===
Burns arrived in Australia as part of the mass migration largely stimulated by the gold-rushes of the 1850s. He emigrated to the colony of Victoria aboard the White Star, a ship of the White Star Line, which departed from Liverpool in England and arrived in Melbourne on 19 January 1860. The passenger list describes Burns as a labourer, aged 19 years and of Irish descent.^{[A]}

In January 1868 Burns married Ellen O'Leary at Mount Gambier in South Australia. O'Leary was a recent immigrant to Australia; born at Killarney in county Kerry, Ireland, she arrived in Adelaide in June 1866 aboard the immigrant vessel Charlotte Gladstone, accompanied by her older brother Cornelius and younger sister Johanna. Robert and Ellen Burns had eight children born between 1868 and 1880, two of whom died in infancy.

During the early 1870s Burns and his family were living at Allendale East, in the Mount Gambier district. By 1877 the family had relocated to the Hamilton district in Victoria, living at Dunkeld from 1878. Burns selected a 70-acre block of land near Dunkeld. By December 1881 Burns's wife and family were living at Stawell. When he was arrested in April 1882 Burns told a police constable that his wife and children were "living near the police station at Stawell".

Burns was probably attracted to the Hamilton and Stawell districts by the proliferation of work opportunities offered by the construction of railways in the colony of Victoria. The rail link from Ballarat to Ararat opened in April 1875, leading to further railway works in the Ararat district as the township developed into a major rail junction. In February 1876 the railway line from Ararat, north-west to Stawell was opened. This line was extended to Murtoa in December 1878. In April 1877 a railway to the south-west was opened, joining Ararat with Dunkeld. This line was later extended to Hamilton and Portland. The railway worker, or navvy, was employed by contractors to provide the manual labour to fell trees, lay sleepers and tracks, excavate cuttings and construct embankments. The workers lived in tent camps, with only basic necessities, located near the construction works.

=== Death of Heenan ===
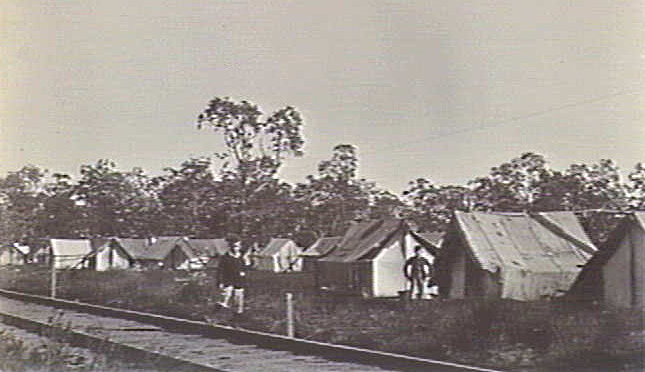
Navvies' camp

From about January 1879 Burns was working with a gang of railway navvies near Wickliffe, east of Dunkeld. He shared a tent with two other men, Henry Wells and Francis Heenan. On February 19 Heenan left the work-site and transacted business at a bank in the township. On his return (as Burns later testified) Heenan reported to his work-mates he was feeling ill; he was vomiting, had diarrhoea and complained of feeling cold. Heenan remained at the work-site until mid-afternoon, when he travelled by train the two miles to his tent. His work-mates gave him some rum and porter, but he continued "vomiting and purging" and died early that evening. The policeman, Constable Healy, attended the scene and, as he told the inquest held two days later: "I ascertained that he and his mate were on very friendly terms and found no marks on the body and could not have any circumstances to foul play". The magistrate who held the inquest into Heenan's death concluded "that the deceased died of an attack of English Cholera". He added: "The symptoms detailed by his mate were consistent with that disease and the post mortem appearance did not indicate any appearance of poison having been taken".

=== Murder of Quinlivan ===
On 16 August 1880 the fully-clothed body of a man, aged about 30 to 40 years, was found during the mustering of sheep in a paddock at Reedy Creek, about seven miles north-west of Wickliffe. The body had been lying "some weeks before it was found, and was much decomposed". The dead man was face downwards and a large portion of the back part of the skull was fractured. A leather purse was found near the body. A magisterial inquiry was held at Wickliffe on August 18 which delivered a finding of "wilful murder against some person or persons unknown". Dr. William Jones of Lake Bolac made a post mortem examination of the body and estimated the man had died about six weeks previously, on or about July 1, and that the death was caused by a fracture of the skull inflicted by "a blunt iron instrument".

Police subsequently established the identity of the murdered man as Michael Quinlivan. Quinlivan's siblings, his brother James and married sister Mary Mahoney, both of Coleraine, were able to identify clothes found on the body as those worn by their brother when they last saw him. After Burns was arrested in April 1882 for the murder of 'Scotty' Forbes, police began to investigate whether Burns had any connections to other unsolved murders in the district. Enquiries revealed that from 18 April 1880 both Burns and Quinlivan had been employed in the Wimmera district at Harrow (near Balmoral) by the contractor, Charles Shrive, each receiving eight shillings per day. Shrive considered the two to be "great mates". The two men had become friends while working on the contract, they being the only two Irishmen in the party. The contractor, Shrive, described Quinlivan as "a quiet saving man". They had left his employment on June 8, with Quinlivan receiving a cheque for £16.4s, of which about £4.4s belonged to Burns. At Balmoral Quinlivan sent the cheque to the National Bank at Hamilton, which was received and credited to Quinlivan's account. The publican of the Western Hotel in Balmoral, Charles Beggs, later testified the two men left together to go to Horsham (48 miles distance). On June 13 C. J. White, a publican from Horsham, was travelling between Balmoral and Horsham when he met Quinlivan and Burns on the road. He took the men's swags into Horsham for them and the pair stayed at White's hotel, the Bull and Mouth, for a few days "drinking freely". During their stay at Horsham Quinlivan sent £17 to be deposited in the Colonial Bank in Dunkeld. On June 16 Quinlivan and Burns purchased a bottle of brandy and travelled by train from Horsham to Ararat.

At Ararat the two men stayed at Catherine Miller's boarding-house where Quinlivan was "very sick" and "was vomiting all night". Quinlivan claimed he had become sick after drinking from the liquor bottle during the train trip. The men had been planning to continue by train to Dunkeld "to give Burns' wife some money", but Quinlivan insisted on staying at Ararat when he became ill. The next morning Quinlivan was feeling better and he and Burns took the train to Dunkeld where they stayed on Burns's selection. On June 19 Quinlivan went to the township and withdrew £15 from the Colonial Bank. After withdrawing the money the two men visited Wilson's store in Dunkeld and then proceeded to Reid's hotel at Strathmore (between Dunkeld and Glenthompson). Burns and Quinlivan drank at the hotel for two hours, after which they left with the intention of going to Wickliffe, a distance of 14 miles. This was the last time Quinlivan was seen alive by witnesses.

By the gathering of evidence for these sequence of events, police established that Burns was the last man seen in the deceased's company "within a short distance from the spot where the mutilated body of Quinlivan was found". Burns wrote a letter on 6 September 1880 to Quinlivan's siblings in Coleraine which spoke of Quinlivan selecting land in Gippsland and how Burns had offered to lend their brother £100 free of interest for twelve months. In a subsequent letter Burns wrote to James Quinlivan stating "he had not seen or heard" from Quinlivan "since he left to interview his relations at Coleraine".

=== 'Scotty' Forbes ===
On 17 January 1882 a miner cutting props for his diggings "on the old track from Stawell to Glenorchy" came upon a headless corpse. The location where the body was found was near the Deep Lead diggings, five miles north-west of Stawell. The miner reported the finding to the Stawell police. The body was naked and had been moved a short distance from its original location by cattle and gnawed at by quolls. Police determined that the head had been severed from the neck by "some sharp instrument". Clothes belonging to the victim were later found in the vicinity.

By April 1882 detectives had identified the headless body found near Deep Lead as Charles Forbes (known as 'Scotty' or 'Charley'), a navvy who had been employed on the construction of the Dimboola railway. Enquiries established that Forbes had been last seen in the company of Robert Francis Burns. On the morning of April 12 police arrested Burns in his room at Gilpin's Hotel in Rupanyup, north of Stawell. He was brought before the Police Magistrate at nearby Murtoa and remanded in custody until later in the month to enable the police to work up the case. On April 28 Burns was charged in the Stawell police court with the murder of Charles Forbes near Deep Lead on or about 19 December 1881. The prisoner appeared in court on the following day when his legal counsel argued that "the police had failed to prove that Forbes was dead, and he might turn up at any day to confound the police". The bench of magistrates, after deliberation, decided to commit Burns to take his trial at the Stawell Assizes on May 9. When the matter came before the Stawell Assizes it was postponed on the application of the Crown as the prisoner had only recently been committed. In addition, Burns was asserting that Forbes was alive, so the postponement would enable the Crown to test that statement.

Police enquiries subsequently revealed that from about October to December 1881 Burns and 'Scotty' Forbes had been work-mates on the extension of the railway line from Horsham to Dimboola. Burns and Forbes were frequently in each other's company. Forbes sold a watch to Burns who paid for it with a valueless cheque. As soon as Burns gained possession of the watch he had pawned it at Sonenberg's shop in Stawell. On the proceeds of the transaction the two men went on a "drinking bout" and Forbes was last seen heading towards Glenorchy in company with Burns, taking with them a gallon of whiskey. Later Burns arrived alone at Glenorchy. Soon afterwards at the Stawell races Burns was asked by an acquaintance about the whereabouts of 'Scotty', and Burns replied that "he had cleared off to New South Wales". In January 1882 Burns was working in a road-making gang at Murtoa. On January 20, a few days after newspaper reports appeared regarding the discovery of the headless body near Deep Lead, Burns asked a work-mate named Michael Carrick to write out a letter "for a man named Charlie Forbes, who was working on a farm near Minyip" (70 miles north of Stawell). Burns said he wanted Carrick to write the letter "so that the person receiving it would not know the handwriting". The letter, regarding arrangements for redeeming Forbes' watch, was sent to George Fergus, publican of the European Hotel in Stawell. At the Murtoa races in February 1882 Burns was inquiring after 'Scotty', who, he said, owed him £20.

During the period before Burns trial in August 1882 the police made extensive enquiries concerning Charles Forbes, to ascertain whether or not he was alive since the date of his disappearance. Descriptions of Forbes and requests for information were published in police and government gazettes throughout the Australian colonies and New Zealand. Mounted-constable Mullaney of Murtoa was entrusted with the task of visiting settlements in the colony of Victoria where he displayed printed notices with a photograph and description of Forbes at post-offices and other prominent places. Constable Hilliard, stationed at Deep Lead, was sent on trips as far afield as Hobart and New Zealand to make inquiries and post notices "calling upon Forbes to appear, if alive". Detective Forster visited South Australia "and other colonies" for the same purpose.

=== Acquittal and further enquiries ===
Burns's trial on the charge of murdering of Charles Forbes at Deep Lead in about December 1881 was conducted over three days from 16 to 18 August 1882 in the Central Criminal Court in Melbourne before Justice Williams. Witnesses identified the clothing found near the body as belonging to Forbes. Over the duration of the trial, 45 witnesses gave evidence. However, the identity of the murder victim was never established beyond doubt and the evidence at the trial was purely circumstantial and Burns was acquitted.

Burns was arrested by Detective Brown for the murder of Michael Quinlivan as he left the Supreme Court after being acquitted of the Deep Lead murder. Burns was brought before the Melbourne City Court and remanded. On 8 September 1882 he was subjected to a police court investigation at which the Police Magistrate determined that a prima facie case had been established and committed Burns to stand trial for Quinlivan's murder in the Hamilton Assizes. Burns initially requested to be committed to the Ararat Assizes, but the police objected on the grounds "that he had too many friends there". Subsequently, the police withdrew their objection and agreed to the change of venue, but "for some unaccountable reason" Burns then withdrew his application and remained in gaol until the trial was listed in late February 1883.

Police also began to consider other deaths with a connection to Burns and suspicion fell upon the death in February 1879 of Francis Heenan, who had been a work-mate of Burns when he died. The authorities began to examine the possibility that his demise "might have been accelerated by unfair means" and to this end it was decided to exhume Heenan's body in the presence of the Government Analytical Chemist. When the grave at Ararat cemetery was opened in October 1882 the coffin was "full of fluid which had acted as a solvent of the fleshy portions of the body, and... little but the bones remained for examination". Portions of the fluid and samples of the soil were taken for analysis, but it was subsequently determined that there was no possibility of identifying "poisonous agents if present" and it was decided to abandon that line of enquiry.

During his six-month period as a remand prisoner in the Hamilton gaol, Burns was treated with extreme wariness by the prison warders who considered his nature to be volatile and savage. During the last three months of his confinement the prisoner barely slept at night, "his rest being broken by most hideous roars and cries". The police sleeping a hundred yards from the gaol were "nightly disturbed by his roaring".

=== Quinlivan murder trials ===
The trial of Burns for the murder of Quinlivan began on 26 February 1883 before Justice Higginbotham at the Hamilton Assizes. Over 40 witnesses were examined over four days. At the conclusion of the trial on March 1 the judge's address to the jury occupied over three hours. The jury were then locked away and remained so for six hours and twenty minutes. Finally Justice Higginbotham called them back and the foreman revealed that the jury could not agree. Higginbotham expressed his regret at the outcome; he dismissed the jury and remanded the prisoner "to the next Court of Assize, to be held at Hamilton six months hence".

In May 1883 Burns legal representatives attempted to change the venue of his re-trial from Hamilton to Melbourne in order to facilitate a more speedy resolution and also "because there was great excitement about Hamilton, and the prisoner would not have the same chance of a fair trial there as he would have in Melbourne". The Crown opposed the application and it was refused.

The second trial of Robert Francis Burns for the murder of Quinlivan was commenced in the Hamilton courthouse on 19 July 1883 before the Chief Justice of Victoria, Sir William Stawell. After a protracted and occasionally contentious jury selection process had been completed, Burns pleaded not guilty. Once again there was a large number of witnesses who gave evidence, including a new witness named Dickson who stated that he saw Burns and Quinlivan in Bell's paddock, near where the body was found. The trial concluded on the following day. Justice Stawell "summed up very unfavourably for the prisoner". The jury retired for three-quarters of an hour, after which they returned a verdict of guilty. The prisoner was then remanded for sentencing. On Monday, July 23, Burns was brought before the court and sentenced to death by Justice Stawell.

=== Confession and execution ===
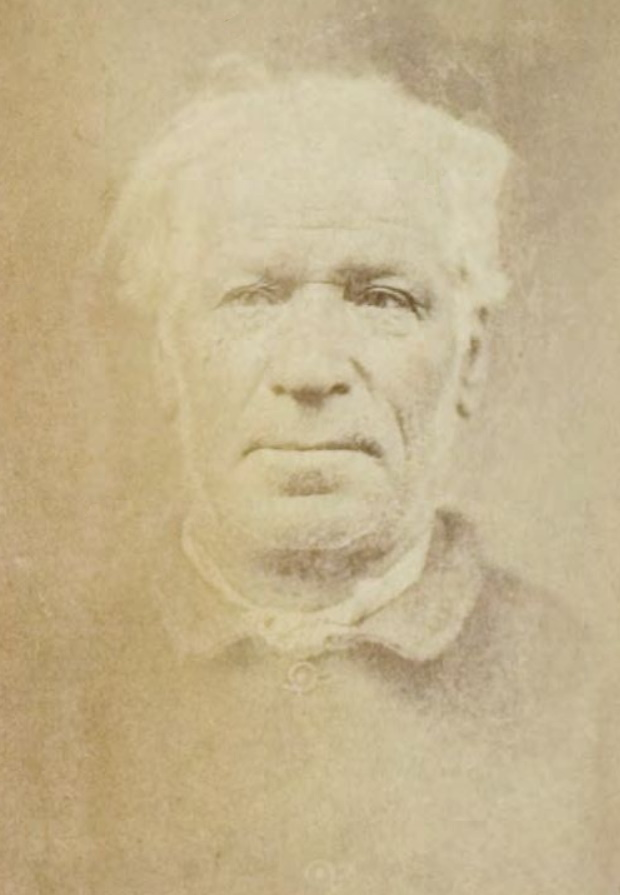
The hangman, Elijah Upjohn, photographed in 1880

After his conviction Burns was held at Ararat Gaol, where the Roman Catholic priest, Father Meade, was "in constant attendance on him". Efforts were made to get Burns to make a full confession, both for the murder of Quinlivan "and others he is accredited with killing", but to no avail. In this regard, he was described as being "callously indifferent to all the entreaties".

In the week before his execution, Burns's wife and children "paid him a farewell visit". During the visit Ellen Burns, having "implicit faith" in the innocence of her husband, "was loud in execration, and hurled some most opprobrious epithets at the gaoler and wardens".

At about 8.30 a.m. on Tuesday, 25 September 1883, Burns was visited by Father Meade to administer "the last rites of the Roman Catholic faith". Meade prayed with him and remained in his company until the execution was carried out. The sheriff arrived at Ararat Gaol at 9 o'clock and immediately went to the Burn's cell to read the warrant permitting the execution of the prisoner. Elijah Upjohn, the executioner, then entered the cell and pinioned Burns, who passively permitted this to be done, after which the prisoner walked "with a firm step" the short distance from his cell to the scaffold. It was reported that Upjohn "appeared very nervous"; the hangman placed the prisoner on the drop, drew the white cap over Burn's face and adjusted the noose, but "in doing so placed the knot loosely under his chin". Rankin, the head-warder, stepped forward, tightened the knot and placed it in position at the back of the neck. When the drop was released Burns fell a distance of six feet and died "without the slightest perceptible movement, death being absolutely instantaneous".

The hanging was witnessed by about 30 spectators, in addition to gaol officials and members of the police force. Initial reports stated that Burns "never spoke after leaving his cell", but handed a statement to the sheriff. The statement contained no admission of guilt, but was an expression of thanks for the treatment he received at the hands of the governor and other gaol officials, for the "exertions of his solicitor and counsel, and for the spiritual offices of the Rev. Father Meade". As was the usual custom Burns's body was left to hang for an hour, with the spectators and officials detained in the prison during that period. After the requisite time had elapsed, Upjohn cut the body down and Burns was placed in a plain coffin with quick lime and buried in the No. 1 exercise yard of the prison.

It was reported that the condemned man had "expressed a desire to make a speech on the gallows", but this had been "prevented by Father Meade". In the days after Burns's execution articles began to appear in the colonial press claiming that the condemned man had made a statement to the hangman Upjohn to the effect that he had murdered eight persons overall – five in Victoria and three in New South Wales. Upjohn stated that while he was in the cell strapping Burns's hands behind his back, he asked the prisoner if he had anything to say. As later detailed in a written declaration by Upjohn, Burns answered: "I have cooked eight, five in Victoria and three in Sydney, and now you are going to cook me". Upjohn's account was disputed by others in the cell at the time, who claimed they heard no such exchange. When he was asked why the others in the cell had not heard the exchange, Upjohn replied that Burns spoke in a very low voice and the priest was reading the "funeral service" at the time. In discussing the probability of such an occurrence, a writer for Melbourne's The Herald newspaper pointed out that Burns "desired to make a confession", but had been restrained by Father Meade. The writer considered it highly likely "that he should seize the opportunity of saying a few words to Upjohn, thus gratifying his vanity or love of notoriety".

== Putative list of victims ==
In the wake of the publicity surrounding Burns's confession as reported by the hangman, Elijah Upjohn, the Melbourne's Herald newspaper made an attempt to identify the murder victims, five in Victoria and three in New South Wales according to the details of the reported confession. On 1 December 1883 an article was published in the Herald providing details and speculating upon the identities of seven murder victims with actual or supposed connections to Burns. The deaths listed in the article do not strictly conform with the pattern of Burns's alleged confession, being six (rather than five) in Victoria and only one in New South Wales. A later article in the Albury Banner and Wodonga Express provided additional information and context regarding the New South Wales murder. The backgrounds and circumstances of the deaths of those detailed in the two articles are listed below (arranged chronologically according to the date of death):

- Richard Going – born in county Tipperary, Ireland, in about 1821. He lived and worked on the Kingower gold-field when the diggings first opened in the mid-1850s. In 1871 Going re-located to Sandhurst (Bendigo) during a mining boom at that place. He purchased shares in a number of gold-mining companies based at Sandhurst, but ultimately "he lost all he had previously made". He then returned to Kingower, and afterwards lived in the Berlin (Rheola) district, about mid-way between Bendigo and St. Arnaud. At the time of his death in December 1877 Richard Going was living in a bark hut on the Orville gold-field, about three miles from Berlin; his nearest neighbour was a man named McGee, whose dwelling was about three hundred yards away. On Friday morning, 7 December 1877, McGee saw that Going's hut had been burnt down. On investigation he found "the calcined bones" of Going amongst the ashes. The death was initially thought to be accidental, but when police investigated the death they concluded that Going "had been brutally and cruelly murdered, then placed in his bed, and his hut set on fire for the purpose of destroying all traces of the horrible deed". Police found no trace amongst the ashes of valuables the deceased man was known to possess, such as his ring and a gold watch and chain. They also discovered signs of a struggle and blood on the earthen floor of the hut. An inquest into the death of Richard Going was held on the following Monday at Rheola. The coroner's summing up favoured a verdict of accidental death, but the jury returned an open verdict, stating it was their belief there was insufficient evidence to determine the cause of death. The jury requested that the substance supposed to be blood and other materials from the scene be forwarded by police to the Government analyst. It was reported that many residents of the neighbourhood were quite convinced Going had been murdered.
- Francis Heenan – born at Roscrea, county Tipperary, Ireland, in about 1845, the son of Denis Heenan and Mary Dwyer. He worked as a labourer on a railway line in the area of Wickliffe, a small town near Ararat. In February 1879 Francis Heenan was sharing a tent with two men: Robert Francis Burns and Henry Wells. They had been working in the same gang for about a month. Heenan died suddenly on 19 February 1879. An inquest concluded he died "of an attack of English Cholera", but police later suspected he had been poisoned by Burns. His remains were exhumed in October 1882 but the analyses that were undertaken were inconclusive.^{[B]}
- John Scott – born in about 1840 and unmarried. Scott occupied a hut adjoining an area of common land at Murphy's Creek on the Orville gold-field, between Moliagul and Tarnagulla, north of Dunolly He was employed as a herdsman on the common. On the evening of 11 March 1879 Scott was found dead in his hut by a neighbouring farmer. A post mortem revealed he had died within the last twenty-four hours from a fracture of the skull, probably caused by a hammer, with blood-marks on the handle, found in the hut.
- Unknown male – On 26 August 1879 a resident of Wagga Wagga was walking near the river at the rear of St. John's church when his dog began "scratching and barking over a particular spot", from which "a most offensive smell" was emanating. After scraping away the loose gravel he discovered a body had been buried there. After the find was reported to the police it was ascertained the remains were of a man, entirely unclothed, whose head had been severed from his body. A search was made for the head, or other clues to identify the man, without result. The location where the body was found was "close to a track used by used by carters of sand and gravel from the river bank" and the body had been covered by gravel screenings left at the site. The general vicinity was often used as a camping ground for travellers. At the coroner's inquest it was determined the man had been dead for about three weeks or a month. After Burns's arrest and execution in Victoria, the New South Wales Inspector-General of Police obtained a photograph of Burns to assist with police enquiries into the Wagga Wagga murder. Two persons subsequently identified Burns as the man who was engaged in 1879 by the railway contractor, George Cornwall, to excavate a cutting on the railway line at Gerogery, 19 miles north of Albury. Two others, including a local publican, stated that the man in the photograph was 'knocking about' Wagga Wagga at the time the headless body was found.
- Burns's brother-in-law (O'Leary) – In November 1883 a Herald reporter was directed to a "gentleman in the liquor trade" in Warrnambool who disclosed information about Burns's brother-in-law, who he alleged was another of Burns's victims. The informant explained that the brother-in-law, O'Leary, had emigrated from Ireland at Burns's request in 1878 (supposedly after representing himself as a squatter). O'Leary worked with Burns until 1879, but about the end of that year he "mysteriously disappeared" (it was alleged) "under peculiar circumstances". The informant had been travelling in the Hamilton district in late 1879 and while staying at O'Farrell's hotel in Penshurst he met with Burns and O'Leary, who were drinking at the hotel. The two men were on their way to 'Brie Brie' station at Glenthompson, to collect payment for a dam-sinking contract they had carried out. Burns "got pretty well intoxicated" that night and "was of such a quarrelsome disposition" that O'Farrell sent him out of the hotel. When Burns reappeared about a fortnight later he was "very 'flush' of money" and without the company of his brother-in-law.
- Michael Quinlivan – born in about 1845 in county Clare, Ireland, the son of James Quinlivan and Bridget (née McGuan). His older siblings, brother James and sister Mary had emigrated to Victoria by the mid-1860s and settled at Coleraine, in the Hamilton district in south-west Victoria. Mary Quinlivan married Michael Mahoney in 1867 at Coleraine. Michael Quinlivan arrived in the colony of Victoria in 1878 and resided in the Hamilton district. He had a close relationship with his siblings, keeping in frequent communication and visiting them occasionally. Quinlivan and Burns were work-mates on a contract near Balmoral from April to June 1880. He was murdered and robbed by Burns near Wickliffe on or about 19 June 1880. Burns was convicted of Quinlivan's murder in July 1883.
- Charles Forbes – "supposed to be a native of the north of Ireland". Forbes was known as 'Scotty' or 'Charley'. From about October to December 1881 Forbes was employed as a navvy on the extension of the railway line from Horsham to Dimboola. One of Forbes' work-mates was Robert Francis Burns and the two were often seen in each other's company. Forbes was last seen alive on 19 December 1881, walking with Burns from Stawell towards Glenorchy. On 17 January 1882 his naked, headless corpse was found in the bush at Deep Lead near Stawell. The description of Forbes, published during police investigations to ascertain if he was alive since the date of his disappearance, was as follows: "About 40 years of age, 5 feet 10½ or 11 inches high, 14 stone weight, full sandy beard, and hair a shade darker". Burns was charged with his murder and tried in August 1882, but the evidence at the trial was purely circumstantial and Burns was acquitted.

== See also ==
- List of serial killers by country

== Notes ==
A.Some sources erroneously claim that Robert Francis Burns arrived in Australia as a convict, transported for stealing to Western Australia in 1862, where he served a ten-year sentence before arriving in Victoria in the mid-1870s. This appears to be a mistaken reference to Robert Burns (alias Whyte), sentenced to 10 years' transportation in Edinburgh, Scotland, who arrived in Western Australia aboard the Norwood in June 1862. Robert Francis Burns, the subject of this article, emigrated to Victoria in January 1860 aboard the White Star (as clearly stated on his prisoner record sheet held in the Victorian Public Record Office and available online).

B.In an apparent effort to conform to the details of Burns's reported confession, the Herald article places Heenan's death as one of the three supposedly committed in New South Wales (despite the fact that Francis Heenan died in south-western Victoria). To do so, the writer interprets "three in Sydney" (i.e, New South Wales) to actually mean "three out of Victoria" and then maintains that Heenan was poisoned at Burra in South Australia. However, this assertion is unsupported by the available evidence.
