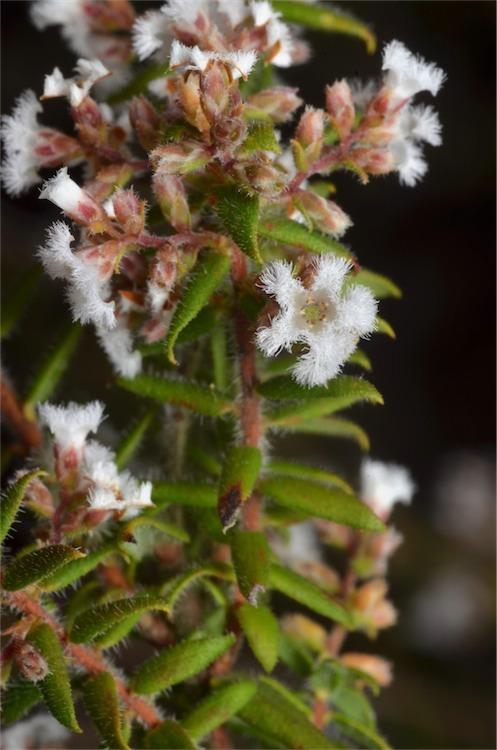
- On Mount William in Victoria

Scientific classification
- Kingdom: Plantae
- Clade: Tracheophytes
- Clade: Angiosperms
- Clade: Eudicots
- Clade: Asterids
- Order: Ericales
- Family: Ericaceae
- Genus: Leucopogon
- Species: L. thymifolius

Binomial name
- Leucopogon thymifolius Lindl. ex Benth.
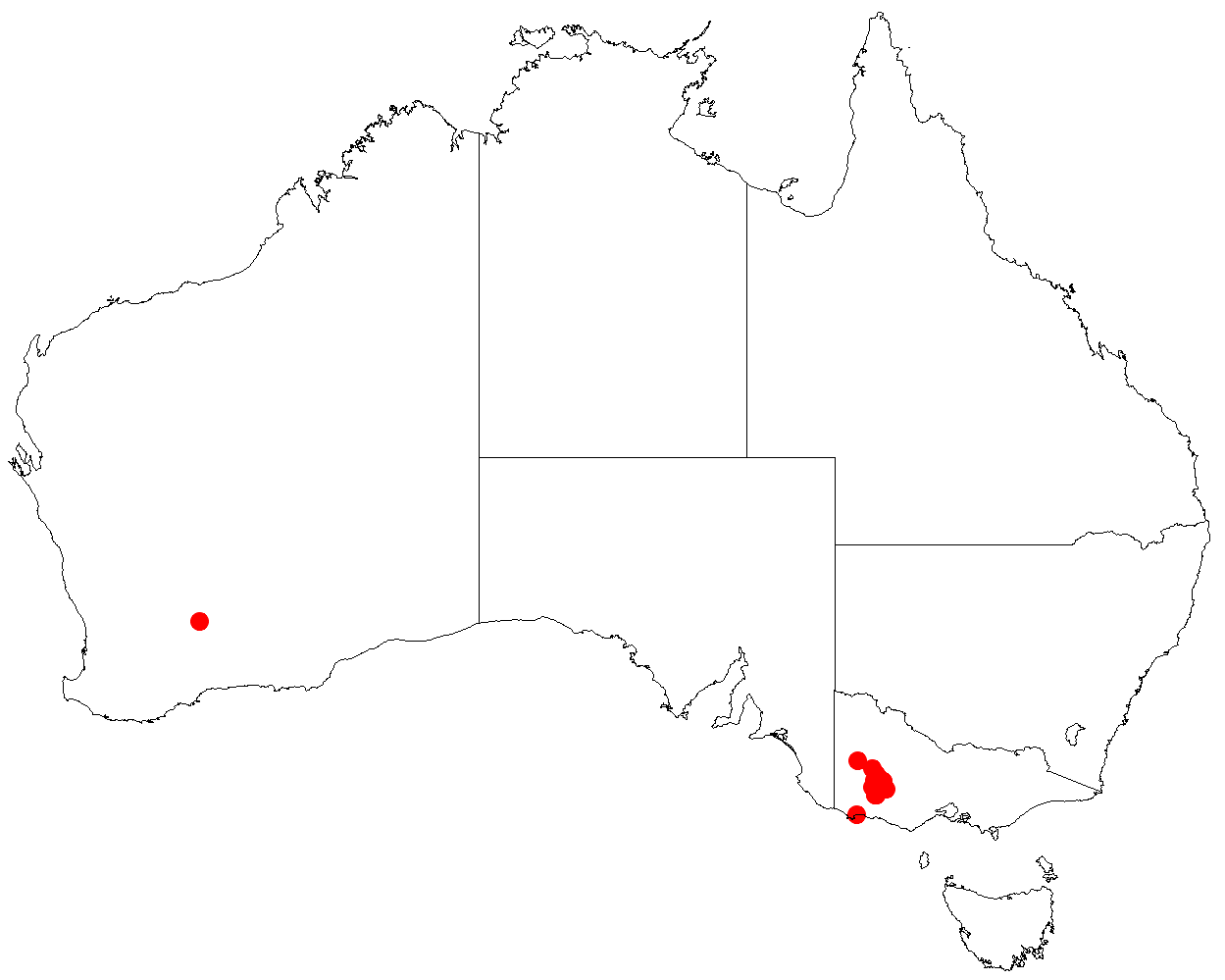
- Occurrence data from AVH

Synonyms
- Styphelia thymifolia (Lindl. ex Benth.) F.Muell.

= Leucopogon thymifolius =

Species of plant

Leucopogon thymifolius, commonly known as thyme beard-heath, is a species of flowering plant in the heath family Ericaceae and is endemic to Victoria. It is a slender shrub with spreading, egg-shaped to oblong leaves and white to pale pink, tube-shaped flowers arranged in spikes of seven to thirteen in leaf axils, or on the ends of leafless branches.

== Description ==
Leucopogon rufus is a slender shrub that typically grows to a height of up to 1.2 m (3 ft 11 in), its branchlets sometimes covered with fine, soft hairs. The leaves are egg-shaped to oblong and spreading, 2.5–11 mm (0.098–0.433 in) long and 0.5–2 mm (0.020–0.079 in) wide. Both surfaces of the leaves are covered with fine, soft hairs, and the edges of the leaves are turned down. The flowers are borne in spikes of seven to thirteen in upper leaf axils and the ends of leafless branches, the spikes 7–25 mm (0.28–0.98 in) long, with egg-shaped, softly-hairy bracteoles 0.8–1.5 mm (0.031–0.059 in) long at the base. The sepals are narrowly egg-shaped, 1.3–2.2 mm (0.051–0.087 in) long, the petals white or pale pink, 1.6–2.5 mm (0.063–0.098 in) long and joined at the base, forming a tube, the lobes slightly longer than the petal tube. Flowering occurs from September to November, and the fruit is 2–3 mm (0.079–0.118 in) long.

== Taxonomy ==
Leucopogon thymifolius was first formally described in 1868 by George Bentham in Flora Australiensis from an unpublished description by John Lindley. The specific epithet (thymifolius) means "thyme-leaved".

== Distribution and habitat ==
Thyme beard-heath occurs in open forest and heathy woodland in the Grampians to nearby Pomonal in western Victoria.

== Conservation status ==
Leucopogon thymifolius is listed as "vulnerable" under the Victorian Government Flora and Fauna Guarantee Act 1988.
