= Westmere =

Westmere may refer to

- a part of Chestermere, Alberta
- Westmere, New York
- Westmere, Manawatū-Whanganui
- Westmere, New Zealand, an Auckland suburb
- Westmere, Victoria
- Westmere, a microarchitecture by Intel that was formerly known as Nehalem-C and is a 32 nm die shrink of the Nehalem microarchitecture
