= Langi Logan =

- Town
- Coordinates: 37°22′23″S 142°56′19″E
- Country: Australia
- State: Victoria
- LGA: Rural City of Ararat
- Location: 184 km (114 mi) NW of Melbourne; 83 km (52 mi) W of Ballarat; 10 km (6.2 mi) S of Ararat

Government
  - State electorate: Ripon
  - Federal division: Wannon

Population
  - Total: 23 (2021 census)
- Postcode: 3377

Langi Logan is a locality in the Wimmera Southern Mallee region of western Victoria, Australia. The locality is on the Tatyoon Road from Ararat to the town of Tatyoon. Langi Logan is in the Rural City of Ararat local government area, 184 kilometres (114 mi) north-west of the state capital, Melbourne. At the 2021 census, Langi Logan had a population of 23. This is down from 25 in the 2016 census.

Langi Logan station was located just north of the town. This station is on the Western standard gauge line between Melbourne and Adelaide.
