= City of Ararat =

Coordinates: 37°17′S 142°55′E

- Local government area
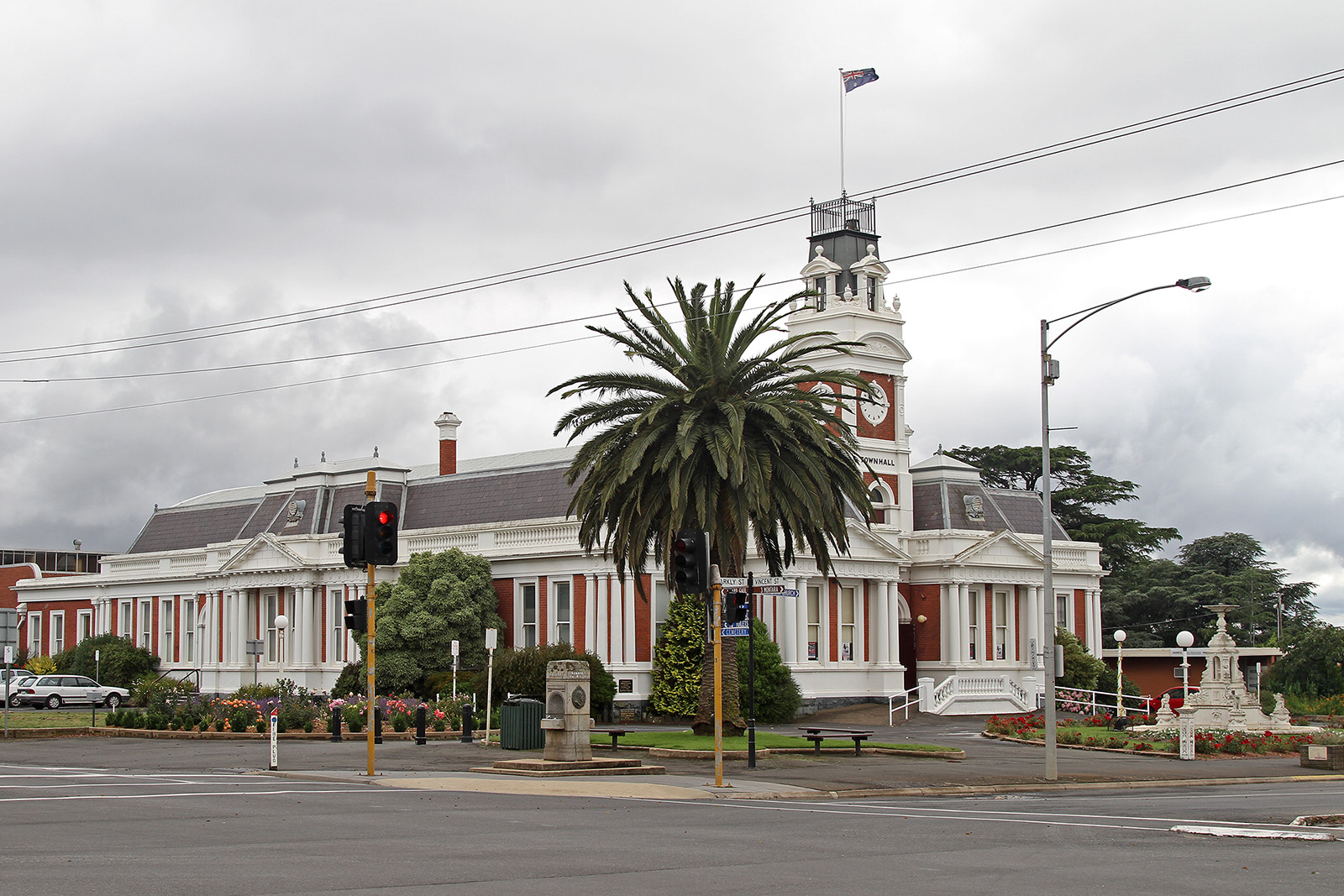
- Former Town Hall, now the Ararat Regional Art Gallery

- The City of Ararat as at its dissolution in 1994
- Country: Australia
- State: Victoria
- Region: Grampians
- Established: 1858
- Council seat: Ararat

Area
  - Total: 19.09 km^{2} (7.37 sq mi)
- County: Ripon

The City of Ararat was a local government area about 200 kilometres (124 mi) west-northwest of Melbourne, the state capital of Victoria, Australia. It existed from 1858 until 1994.

Headquartered in Ararat, Victoria, the city had jurisdiction over an area of 19.09 square kilometres (7.4 sq mi), and by 1992 a population of 8,070 people. It was surrounded by the separate and largely rural Shire of Ararat.

== History ==
Ararat was first incorporated as a borough on 24 September 1858, known as the Municipal District of Ararat, headed by chairmen. In 1862, it was declared as a borough and known as the Borough of Ararat, headed by mayors. It was declared as a town on 29 May 1934, and on 24 May 1950, it was proclaimed as a city. It received some land from the surrounding Shire of Ararat on 27 May 1960.

On 23 September 1994, the City of Ararat was abolished, and along with the Shire of Ararat and parts of the Shire of Stawell, was merged into the newly created Rural City of Ararat.

The former town hall was National Trust listed and later adaptively reused as the Ararat Regional Art Gallery, managed by the Rural City of Ararat. It was designed by Molloy and Smith and built in 1899.

== Population ==
Year	Population
1954	7,414
1958	7,880*
1961	7,934
1966	8,237
1971	8,312
1976	8,288
1981	8,336
1986	8,015
1991	7,633

* Estimate in the 1958 Victorian Year Book.

== Chairmen and mayors ==
=== Chairmen ===
- 1858-60 Cr F Lowe
- 1860-61 Cr JD Smith
- 1861-62 Cr TM Girdlestone
- 1862-62 Cr WR Mitchell

=== Mayors ===
- 1862-66 Cr T Walker
- 1866-68 Cr GWH Grano
- 1868-69 Cr C Mulcahy
- 1869-70 Cr W Rundell
- 1870-71 Cr WH Dawson
- 1871-72 Cr W Rundell
- 1872-73 Cr J Tuson
- 1873-74 Cr GWH Grano
- 1874-75 Cr WH Dawson
- 1875-76 Cr GWH Grano
- 1876-77 Cr W Beveridge
- 1877-78 Cr JD Smith
- 1878-79 Cr D Gordon
- 1879-80 Cr T Tobin
- 1880-81 Cr J Hewitt
- 1881-82 Cr J Tuson
- 1882-83 Cr MC Nott
- 1883-84 Cr T Flattely
- 1884-85 Cr J Crouch
- 1885-86 Cr J Tuson
- 1886-87 Cr T Tobin
- 1887-88 Cr WH Dawson
- 1888-89 Cr H Thompson
- 1889-90 Cr T Tobin
- 1890-91 Cr TW Palmer
- 1891-92 Cr H Dodd
- 1892-93 Cr E Boberski
- 1893-94 Cr WE Nichols
- 1894-95 Cr T Tobin
- 1895-96 Cr G Burns
- 1896-97 Cr T Tobin
- 1897-98 Cr E Boberski
- 1998-99 Cr EJ Simpson
- 1899–1900 Cr WH Elliott
- 1900-01 Cr D Hamilton
- 1901-02 Cr R Hargreaves
- 1902-04 Cr TA Wild
- 1904-05 Cr E Boberski
- 1905-06 Cr TA Wild
- 1906-07 Cr EJ Simpson
- 1907-08 Cr R Hargreaves
- 1908-10 Cr J Moore
- 1910-12 Cr J Irwin
- 1912-14 Cr G Burn
- 1914-15 Cr W Tibbles
- 1915-16 Cr J Irwin
- 1916-17 Cr JJ Northey
- 1917-18 Cr T Impey
- 1918-19 Cr TJ Gossip
- 1919-20 Cr WH Mackay
- 1920-21 Cr EC McGibbony
- 1921-22 Cr J Moore
- 1922-23 Cr WH Toole
- 1923-24 Cr G Bryant
- 1924-26 Cr W Timmins
- 1926-27 Cr J Irwin
- 1927-28 Cr HJ Blackie
- 1928-30 Cr WH Toole
- 1930-32 Cr J Moore
- 1932-33 Cr WL Brewster
