= Streatham, Victoria =

Streatham
- Town
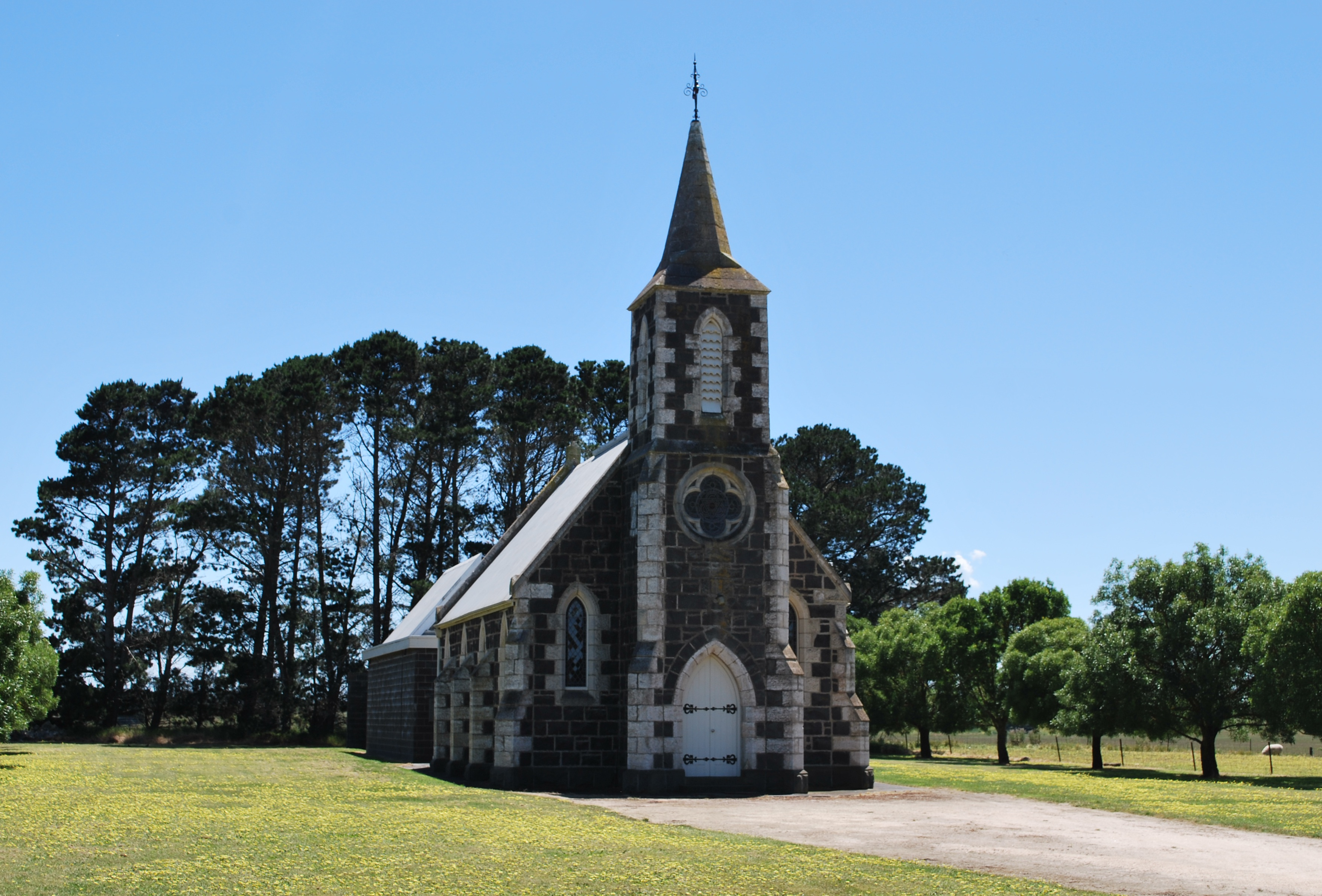
- St John's Uniting church at Streatham

- Coordinates: 37°40′45″S 143°3′32″E
- Country: Australia
- State: Victoria
- LGA: Rural City of Ararat
- Location: 196 km (122 mi) W of Melbourne; 80 km (50 mi) W of Ballarat; 55 km (34 mi) S of Ararat; 28 km (17 mi) W of Skipton; 67 km (42 mi) E of Dunkeld

Government
  - State electorate: Lowan
  - Federal division: Wannon

Population
  - Total: 158 (2021 census)
- Postcode: 3351

Streatham /ˈstrɛθəm/ is a town in the Western District of Victoria, Australia, located on the Glenelg Highway, 80 kilometres (50 mi) west of Ballarat, in the Rural City of Ararat. At the 2021 census, Streatham had a population of 158.

Streatham is one of the earliest settlements established in the area covered by the current-day Rural City of Ararat Council. In the 1840s the site was known as Fiery Creek, after the waterway by which it is located, but was named after Streatham, London, England, in 1852. The Post Office opened on 1 September 1844 as Fiery Creek (Streatham from 1 January 1854). Fiery Creek was the region's first Post Office and was also a meeting place for settlers.

The main industry is agriculture, a variety of crops are grown, canola, lupins, wheat, oats, triticale and barley. Sheep, fine wool, meat, and cattle are also a product of the area.

On 12 February 1977, Streatham was partially destroyed by a bushfire which was one of many that spread rapidly across the plains of Western Victoria that day. The fire left five men dead and a further seven people suffering heart attacks while defending their properties and the town. The Church, post office, community hall, shops and eighty-one homes were all destroyed in the blaze. Other fires were reported at Lismore, Tatyoon, Pura Pura, Penshurst and at Cressy.

The town with nearby localities Mininera and Westmere has a football club known as SMW Rovers which competes in the Mininera & District Football League.

Golfers play at the course of the Streatham Golf Club on the Glenelg Highway.

== See also ==
- Blythvale
- Carranballac Homestead
