= Mininera & District Football League =

Australian football league

General Information
Founded	1921

Records
Highest Score	515 – Great Western 79.41.515 (v Ararat Eagles 1.0.6) – 2019
Most goals in a game	28 – Jason Mifsud – Caramut (v Dunkeld) – 1994
Most goals in a season	205 – Jason Mifsud – Caramut – 1994
Most wins in a row	36 – Tatyoon – 2006–08
Most losses in a row	43 – Dunkeld – 1993–96
Most flags in a row	4 – Lake Bolac – 1954–1957

The Mininera & District Football League is an Australian rules football competition based in South-western Victoria, with clubs located east of Hamilton, south of Ararat and west of Colac. The league absorbed several teams from the defunct Ararat & District Football Association in 2000.

== History ==
The Streatham & District Football Association formed in 1921. The Association changed its name to Tatyoon District Football Association in 1926. In 1930 the name was changed again to Mininera & District Football Association.

In the early 1950s, eight clubs participated: Carranballac, Glenthompson, Lake Bolac, Mininera-Westmere Rovers, Streatham, Tatyoon, Wickliffe and Willaura.

In 1954, the competition changed its name to the Mininera & District Football League. Mininera-Westmere Rovers merged with Streatham to form the SMW Rovers, and Dunkeld and Woorndoo entered the competition. In 1956, Woorndoo left the competition for the nearby Mount Noorat Football League.

In 1963, Carranballac folded. Caramut joined the competition from 1965 from the Port Fairy Football League. In 1970, Hawkesdale and Penshurst entered.

In 1986, Wickliffe merged with Lake Bolac, and Woorndoo re-entered the league in 1987.

In 1998, Hawkesdale merged with Macarthur (from the South West District Football League) and Willaura went into recess. In 1999 Lismore-Derrinallum entered the competition.

In 2000, the Mininera and District Football League absorbed some of the clubs from the defunct Ararat & District Football Association, including Caledonians-Miners, Prestige-Trinity and Moyston. Caledonians-Miners and Prestige-Trinity merged to form Ararat United, whilst Moyston merged with Willaura.

In 2001, Woorndoo decided to acknowledge the contributions of Mortlake citizens helping the club over the years by renaming the club Woorndoo-Mortlake. 2001 Dunkeld went into recess.

In 2003 Glenthompson opted to merge with the remnants of the recessed Dunkeld club to form Glenthompson Dunkeld Football Netball Club, and Ararat United went into recess before officially folding in 2005.

The Ararat Eagles joined the competition in 2011 from the Lexton Plains Football League, which disbanded after the 2010 season. Great Western, originally from the Ararat & District Football Association, joined the league from the Horsham & District Football League in 2012, following a year in recess.

== Clubs ==
=== Locations ===
Locations of the 2025 Mininera & District FL clubs. Coloured pogs represent teams with multiple home grounds: orange for Glenthompson Dunkeld, yellow for Hawkesdale Macarthur, blue for Lismore Derrinallum, cyan for Moyston Willaura, purple for Woorndoo Mortlake.

=== Current ===
Club	Colours	Nickname	Home Ground	Former League	Est.	Years in MDFL	MDFL Senior Premierships	
Club	Colours	Nickname	Home Ground	Former League	Est.	Years in MDFL	Total	Years
Ararat Eagles		Eagles	Alexandra Oval, Ararat	LPFL	2000	2011–	1	2022
Caramut		Swans	Caramut Recreation Reserve, Caramut	PFFL	1882	1965–	3	1971, 1994, 1999
Glenthompson Dunkeld		Rams	Dunkeld Recreation Reserve, Dunkeld	–	2004	2004–	1	2010
Great Western		Lions	Central Park, Great Western	HDFNL	1880s	2012–	1	2019
Hawkesdale Macarthur		Eagles	Hawkesdale Recreation Reserve, Hawkesdale and Macarthur Recreation Reserve, Macarthur	–	1997	1997–	0	-
Lismore Derrinallum		Demons	Lismore Recreation Reserve, Lismore and Derrinallum Recreation Reserve, Derrinallum	–	1999	1999–	4	2015, 2017, 2025, 2026
Moyston Willaura		Pumas	Moyston Recreation Reserve, Moyston and Willaura Recreation Reserve, Willaura	–	2000	2000–	1	2014
Penshurst		Bombers	Penshurst Recreation Reserve, Penshurst	PFFL	1874	1970–	12	1970, 1973, 1979, 1981, 1986, 1991, 1992, 1993, 1998, 2009, 2012, 2024
SMW Rovers		Bulldogs	Conna Wilson Reserve, Mininera	–	1954	1954–	8	1960, 1963, 1964, 1967, 1968, 1987, 2003, 2004
Tatyoon		Hawks	Tatyoon Recreation Reserve, Tatyoon	–	1924	1924–	12	1946, 1952, 1972, 1980, 1995, 1996, 2006, 2007, 2008, 2011, 2016, 2023
Wickliffe-Lake Bolac		Magpies	Lake Bolac Recreation Reserve, Lake Bolac	–	1986	1986–	9	1989, 1990, 1997, 2000, 2001, 2002, 2005, 2013, 2018
Woorndoo-Mortlake (Woorndoo 1986-2000)		Tigers	Woorndoo Recreation Reserve, Woorndoo and DC Farran Oval, Mortlake	MNFL	1882	1954–1955, 1986–1989, 1991–	0	-

=== Former clubs ===
Club	Colours	Nickname	Home Ground	Former League	Est.	Years in MDFL	MDFL Senior Premierships		Fate
Club	Colours	Nickname	Home Ground	Former League	Est.	Years in MDFL	Total	Years	Fate
Ararat United		United	Ararat City Band Centre, Ararat	ADFA	1996	2000–2003	0	–	Folded after 2003 season
Carranballac		Demons	Carranballac Recreation Reserve, Carranballac	–	1921	1921–1962	3	1928, 1932, 1935	Folded after 1962 season
Dunkeld		Kangaroos	Dunkeld Recreation Reserve, Dunkeld	W&DFA	1886	1953–2001	1	1976	Merged with Glenthompson to form Glenthompson Dunkeld in 2004
Glenthompson		Bloods	Glenthompson Recreation Reserve, Glenthompson	D&DFL	1883	1950–2003	6	1969, 1974, 1978, 1982, 1983, 1985	Merged with Dunkeld to form Glenthompson Dunkeld in 2004
Hawkesdale		Cats	Hawkesdale Recreation Reserve, Hawkesdale	PFFL	1878	1970–1997	2	1977, 1988	Merged with Macarthur to form Hawkesdale Macarthur in 1997
Lake Bolac		Bombers	Lake Bolac Recreation Reserve, Lake Bolac	H&DFA	1875	1925, 1929, 1946–1985	10	1925, 1929, 1948, 1949, 1950, 1954, 1955, 1956, 1957, 1965	Merged with Wickliffe to form Wickliffe-Lake Bolac in 1986
Mininera		Magpies	Conna Wilson Reserve, Mininera	–	1920	1921–1924	2	1921, 1923	Merged with Westmere to form Mininera-Westmere in 1926
Mininera-Westmere		Rovers	Conna Wilson Reserve, Mininera	–	1925	1926–1953	5	1930, 1933, 1934, 1938, 1947	Merged with Streatham to form SMW Rovers in 1954
Streatham			Streaham Recreation Reserve, Streatham	–	1873	1921–1953	9	1922, 1924, 1926, 1927, 1931, 1936, 1937, 1939, 1945	Merged with Mininera-Westmere to form SMW Rovers in 1954
Westmere			Westmere Recreation Ground, Westmere	–	1920	1921–1923	0	–	Merged with Mininera to form Mininera-Westmere in 1926
Wickliffe		Magpies	Wickliffe Recreation Reserve, Wickliffe	CFA	1883	1950–1985	2	1959, 1984	Merged with Lake Bolac to form Wickliffe-Lake Bolac in 1986
Willaura		Saints	Willaura Recreation Reserve, Willaura	H&DFA	1893	1947–1999	7	1951, 1953, 1958, 1961, 1962, 1966, 1975	Merged with Moyston to form Moyston-Willaura in 2000

== Premierships ==
Senior Football

- 1921 Mininera
- 1922 Streatham
- 1923 Mininera
- 1924 Streatham
- 1925 Lake Bolac
- 1926 Streatham
- 1927 Streatham
- 1928 Carranballac
- 1929 Lake Bolac
- 1930 WM Rovers
- 1931 Streatham
- 1932 Carranballac
- 1933 WM Rovers
- 1934 WM Rovers
- 1935 Carranballac
- 1936 Streatham
- 1937 Streatham
- 1938 WM Rovers
- 1939 Streatham
- 1940 - 1944 Recess
- 1945 Streatham
- 1946 Tatyoon
- 1947 WM Rovers
- 1948 Lake Bolac
- 1949 Lake Bolac
- 1950 Lake Bolac
- 1951 Willaura
- 1952 Tatyoon
- 1953 Willaura
- 1954 Lake Bolac
- 1955 Lake Bolac
- 1956 Lake Bolac
- 1957 Lake Bolac
- 1958 Willaura
- 1959 Wickliffe
- 1960 SWM Rovers
- 1961 Willaura
- 1962 Willaura
- 1963 SWM Rovers
- 1964 SWM Rovers
- 1965 Lake Bolac
- 1966 Willaura
- 1967 SWM Rovers
- 1968 SWM Rovers
- 1969 Glenthompson
- 1970 Penshurst
- 1971 Caramut
- 1972 Tatyoon
- 1973 Penshurst
- 1974 Glenthompson
- 1975 Willaura
- 1976 Dunkeld
- 1977 Hawkesdale
- 1978 Glenthompson
- 1979 Penshurst
- 1980 Tatyoon
- 1981 Penshurst
- 1982 Glenthompson
- 1983 Glenthompson
- 1984 Wickliffe
- 1985 Glenthompson
- 1986 Penshurst
- 1987 SWM Rovers
- 1988 Hawkesdale
- 1989 Wickliffe-Lake Bolac
- 1990 Wickliffe-Lake Bolac
- 1991 Penshurst
- 1992 Penshurst
- 1993 Penshurst
- 1994 Caramut
- 1995 Tatyoon
- 1996 Tatyoon
- 1997 Wickliffe-Lake Bolac
- 1998 Tatyoon
- 1999 Caramut
- 2000 Wickliffe-Lake Bolac
- 2001 Wickliffe-Lake Bolac
- 2002 Wickliffe-Lake Bolac
- 2003 SWM Rovers
- 2004 SWM Rovers
- 2005 Wickliffe-Lake Bolac
- 2006 Tatyoon
- 2007 Tatyoon
- 2008 Tatyoon
- 2009 Penshurst
- 2010 Glenthompson-Dunkeld
- 2011 Tatyoon
- 2012 Penshurst
- 2013 Wickliffe-Lake Bolac
- 2014 Moyston-Willaura
- 2015 Lismore-Derrinallum
- 2016 Tatyoon
- 2017 Lismore-Derrinallum
- 2018 Wickliffe-Lake Bolac
- 2019 Great Western
- 2020 League in recess due to COVID-19 pandemic
- 2021 Finals cancelled due to COVID-19 pandemic
- 2022 Ararat Eagles d Tatyoon
- 2023 Tatyoon d Woorndoo-Mortlake
- 2024 Penshurst d Wickliffe-Lake Bolac
- 2025 Lismore-Derrinallum d Ararat Eagles
- 2026 Lismore-Derrinallum d Woorndoo-Mortlake

== Leading Goal Kickers ==
Senior Football

Year	Player	H&A goals	Finals goals	Total Goals
1946	0	0	0	0
1947	0	0	0	0
1948	0	0	0	0
1949	Eric Robertson (Lake Bolac)	97	20	117
1950	Eric Robertson (Lake Bolac)	105	2	107
1951	0	0	0	0
1952	0	0	0	0
1953	0	0	0	0
1954	Russell Park (Lake Bolac)	96	12	108
1955	Russell Park (Lake Bolac)	121	17	138
1956	Russell Park (Lake Bolac)	48	5	53
1957	Russell Park (Lake Bolac)	41	10	51
1958	Russell Park (Lake Bolac)	65	6	75
1959	Russell Park (Lake Bolac)	36	0	36
1960	Bill Gleeson (Willaura)	58	0	58
1961	Bill Gleeson (Willaura)	61	3	64
1962	Bill Gleeson (Willaura)	55	0	55
1963	David Thomas (Tatyoon)	38	4	42
1964	Henry Gunstone (SWM)	26	0	26
1965	Russell Park (Lake Bolac)	74	7	81
1966	Don McCrow (Willaura)	50	8	58
1967	John Potter (Lake Bolac)	40	2	42
1968	Euan Fraser (Glenthompson)	72	0	72
1969	Richard Coghlan (Caramut)	58	0	58
1970	Max Biggin (Willuara)	68	4	72
1971	Richard Coghlan (Caramut)	88	6	94
1972	Bill Quaife (Tatyoon)	58	8	66
1973	Peter Sheen (Hawkesdale)	82	0	82
1974	David Wynd (Caramut)	82	0	82
1975	N McPherson (Glenthompson)	74	0	74
1976	Bert McArthur (Dunkeld)	115	9	124
1977	Bert McArthur (Dunkeld)	136	2	138
1978	Bert McArthur (Dunkeld)	71	0	71
1979	Neville Osborne (Penshurst)	132	0	132
1980	Neville Osborne (Penshurst)	94	7	101
1981	Colin Eales (Penshurst)	81	0	81
1982	I Saunderson (Tatyoon)	72	0	72
1983	Neville Osborne (Penshurst)	98	0	98
1984	Leo McMahon (Glenthompson)	100	0	100
1985	Leo McMahon (Glenthompson)	113	0	113
1986	John Uebergang (Penshurst)	88	0	88
1987	Les Brennan (Tatyoon)	63	0	63
1988	R Cooper (SWM Rovers)	76	0	76
1989	John Uebergang (Penshurst)	123	0	123
1990	John Uebergang (Penshurst)	107	0	107
1991	Shane Dempsey (Penshurst)	145	16	161
1992	Darren Templeton (Dunkeld)	103	1	104
1993	Darryl Madex (Tatyoon)	82	0	82
1994	Jason Misfud (Caramut)	192	13	205
1995	Tony Russell (Caramut)	157	14	171
1996	John Uebergang (Penshurst)	130	19	149
1997	Paul Campigli (Tatyoon)	132	7	139
1998	Paul Campigli (Tatyoon)	91	13	104
1999	Tim Fraser (Glenthompson)	114	2	116
2000	Paul Campigli (Tatyoon)	88	8	96
2001	David Bell (Caramut)	117	3	120
2002	Tim Chatfield (Caramut)	88	15	103
2003	Adam Lehmann (Woorndoo Mortlake)	102	7	109
2004	Jason Keays (Tatyoon)	92	0	92
2005	Jason Keays (Tatyoon)	119	0	119
2006	Ron Watson (Penshurst)	80	0	80
2007	Ron Watson (Penshurst)	82	0	82
2008	Frank Matthews (Hawkesdale-Macarthur)	94	0	94
2009	Grant Ewing (Penhurst)	113	0	113
2010	Lachlan Hamilton (Moyston Willaura)	65	0	65
2011	Aiden Bell (Tatyoon)	62	10	72
2012	Aiden Bell (Tatyoon)	96	12	108
2013	Aiden Bell (Tatyoon)	78	11	89
2014	Steven Butler (Tatyoon)	78	9	87
2015	Wayne Loader (Lismore Derrinullum)	118	9	127
2016	John Vanderwaal (Moyston Willaura)	124	0	124
2017	Patrick Sinnott (Hawkesdale-Macarthur)	77	0	77
2018	William Slattery (Wickliffe Lake Bolac)	75	2	77
2019	Ben Hunt (Penshurst)	72	5	77
2020	N/A (COVID-19 Pandemic)	N/A	0	0
2021	Damon folkes (Great Western)	70	0	70
2022	Michael Lockyer (Lismore Derrinallum)	101	11	112
2023	Thomas Waters (Glenthompson-Dunkeld)	66	2	68
2024	Josh Rentsch (Penshurst)	89	4	93
2025	Lachlan Constable (Lismore Derrinallum)	102	9	111

== 2022 Ladder ==
Mininera DFL	Wins	Byes	Losses	Draws	For	Against	%	Pts	Final	Team	G	B	Pts	Team	G	B	Pts
Ararat Eagles	16	0	0	0	1921	478	401.88%	64	Elimination	Woorndoo-Mortlake	17	12	114	Glenthompson-Dunkeld	7	2	44
Tatyoon	15	0	1	0	1860	490	379.59%	60	Qualifying	Tatyoon	14	9	93	Lismore-Derrinallum	14	7	91
Lismore-Derrinallum	12	0	3	1	2303	802	287.16%	50	1st Semi	Woorndoo-Mortlake	15	15	105	Lismore-Derrinallum	8	6	54
Woorndoo-Mortlake	11	0	5	0	1806	759	237.94%	44	2nd Semi	Tatyoon	11	9	75	Ararat Eagles	7	6	48
Glenthompson-Dunkeld	10	0	6	0	1530	947	161.56%	40	Preliminary	Ararat Eagles	6	15	51	Woorndoo-Mortlake	5	8	38
Penshurst	9	0	6	1	1482	937	158.16%	38	Grand	Ararat Eagles	13	10	88	Tatyoon	5	13	43
Wickliffe-Lake Bolac	7	0	9	0	1305	1140	114.47%	28									
SWM Rovers	6	0	10	0	1256	1273	98.66%	24									
Hawkesdale-Macarthur	5	0	11	0	815	1717	47.47%	20									
Great Western	3	0	13	0	787	2250	34.98%	12									
Caramut	1	0	15	0	562	2402	23.40%	4									
Moyston-Willaura	0	0	16	0	570	3002	18.99%	0									

== 2023 Ladder ==
Mininera DFL	Wins	Byes	Losses	Draws	For	Against	%	Pts	Final	Team	G	B	Pts	Team	G	B	Pts
Tatyoon	15	0	1	0	1946	491	396.33%	60	Elimination	Penshurst	5	9	39	Glenthompson-Dunkeld	11	13	79
Woorndoo-Mortlake	13	0	3	0	1718	698	246.13%	52	Qualifying	Woorndoo-Mortlake	9	8	62	Wickliffe-Lake Bolac	10	10	70
Wickliffe-Lake Bolac	12	0	4	0	1964	746	263.27%	48	1st Semi	Woorndoo-Mortlake	9	15	69	Glenthompson-Dunkeld	5	12	42
Penshurst	11	0	5	0	1266	851	148.77%	44	2nd Semi	Tatyoon	14	14	98	Wickliffe-Lake Bolac	7	14	56
Glenthompson-Dunkeld	10	0	6	0	1661	814	204.05%	40	Preliminary	Woorndoo-Mortlake	13	9	87	Wickliffe-Lake Bolac	7	10	52
Ararat Eagles	10	0	6	0	1285	861	149.25%	40	Grand	Tatyoon	10	2	62	Woorndoo-Mortlake	6	12	48
Hawkesdale-Macarthur	8	0	8	0	1431	1101	129.97%	32									
Great Western	7	0	9	0	1356	1313	103.27%	28									
Lismore-Derrinallum	4	0	11	1	952	1215	78.35%	18									
SWM Rovers	4	0	12	0	1219	1595	76.43%	16									
Moyston-Willaura	1	0	15	0	448	3089	14.50%	4									
Caramut	0	0	15	1	199	2671	7.45%	2									

== 2024 Ladder ==
Mininera DFL	Wins	Byes	Losses	Draws	For	Against	%	Pts	Final	Team	G	B	Pts	Team	G	B	Pts
Wickliffe-Lake Bolac	16	0	0	0	1931	781	247.25%	64	Elimination	Hawkesdale-Macarthur	10	14	74	Ararat Eagles	7	17	59
Penshurst	15	0	1	0	2551	557	457.99%	60	Qualifying	Penshurst	19	12	126	Lismore-Derrinallum	9	8	62
Lismore-Derrinallum	11	0	5	0	1471	997	147.54%	44	1st Semi	Lismore-Derrinallum	11	9	75	Hawkesdale-Macarthur	9	9	63
Hawkesdale-Macarthur	10	0	6	0	1351	1126	119.98%	40	2nd Semi	Penshurst	9	15	69	Wickliffe-Lake Bolac	10	8	68
Ararat Eagles	10	0	6	0	1338	1173	114.07%	40	Preliminary	Wickliffe-Lake Bolac	13	15	93	Lismore-Derrinallum	6	4	40
Tatyoon	9	0	6	1	1436	1280	112.19%	38	Grand	Penshurst	8	5	53	Wickliffe-Lake Bolac	7	6	48
Woorndoo-Mortlake	8	0	8	0	1221	1333	91.60%	32									
Glenthompson-Dunkeld	6	0	9	1	1333	1239	107.59%	26									
SWM Rovers	5	0	11	0	966	1688	57.23%	20									
Great Western	4	0	12	0	1237	1563	79.14%	16									
Moyston-Willaura	1	0	15	0	764	2090	36.56%	4									
Caramut	0	0	16	0	623	2395	26.01%	0									

== 2025 Ladder ==
Mininera DFL	Wins	Byes	Losses	Draws	For	Against	%	Pts	Final	Team	G	B	Pts	Team	G	B	Pts
Lismore-Derrinallum	14	0	2	0	1935	656	294.97%	56	Elimination	Tatyoon	9	12	66	Glenthompson-Dunkeld	6	10	46
Ararat Eagles	14	0	2	0	1531	848	180.54%	56	Qualifying	Ararat Eagles	13	14	92	Penshurst	7	14	56
Penshurst	13	0	3	0	1803	939	192.01%	52	1st Semi	Tatyoon	12	8	80	Penshurst	8	12	60
Glenthompson-Dunkeld	11	0	5	0	1284	1028	124.90%	44	2nd Semi	Lismore-Derrinallum	14	19	103	Ararat Eagles	2	5	17
Tatyoon	8	0	7	1	1348	1191	113.18%	34	Preliminary	Ararat Eagles	10	15	75	Tatyoon	10	14	74
Woorndoo-Mortlake	8	0	8	0	1390	1062	130.89%	32	Grand	Lismore-Derrinallum	16	12	108	Ararat Eagles	7	2	44
SWM Rovers	7	0	9	0	1190	1403	84.82%	28									
Hawkesdale-Macarthur	6	0	9	1	1234	1411	87.46%	26									
Wickliffe-Lake Bolac	6	0	10	0	1205	1402	85.95%	24									
Great Western	3	0	13	0	1027	1915	53.63%	12									
Moyston-Willaura	3	0	13	0	812	2009	40.42%	12									
Caramut	2	0	14	0	816	1711	47.69%	8									

== VFL/ AFL players ==
- Bill McMaster - Lake Bolac - Geelong
- Leon Cameron - Caramut - Western Bulldogs, Richmond
- David Astbury - Tatyoon - Richmond
- Lloyd Meek - SMW Rovers - Fremantle , Hawthorn

== Book ==
- Mighty Mininera League - The centenary of the Mininera and District Football League by Kel Murray ISBN 978-0-9751426-2-2
