= Rural City of Ararat =

Coordinates: 37°17′00″S 142°55′00″E

- Local government area
- Location in Victoria

- Interactive map of Rural City of Ararat
- Country: Australia
- State: Victoria
- Region: Grampians
- Established: 1994
- Council seat: Ararat

Government
  - Mayor: o Armstrong
  - State electorates: Lowan; Ripon
  - Federal division: Wannon

Area
  - Total: 4,211 km^{2} (1,626 sq mi)

Population
  - Total: 11,880 (2021)
  - Density: 2.8212/km^{2} (7.307/sq mi)
- Gazetted: 23 September 1994
- Website: Rural City of Ararat
LGAs around Rural City of Ararat
Northern Grampians	Northern Grampians	Pyrenees
Southern Grampians	Rural City of Ararat	Pyrenees
Moyne	Moyne	Corangamite

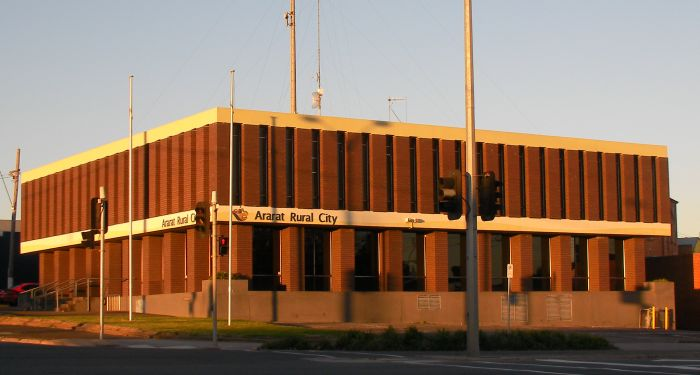
Ararat Rural City Council offices – 21 Vincent Street, Ararat

The Rural City of Ararat is an Australian local government area located in the western part of the state of Victoria. It covers an area of 4,211 square kilometres (1,626 mi^{2}) and in the 2021 had a population of 11,880. The area includes the towns of Ararat, Lake Bolac, Moyston, Pomonal, Streatham, Tatyoon, Wickliffe and Willaura.

The rural city is governed and administered by the Ararat Rural City Council; its seat of local government and administrative centre is located at the council headquarters in Ararat. The rural city is named after the main urban settlement located in the north of the LGA, that is Ararat, which is also the LGA's most populous urban centre with a population of 8,076.

The traditional owners of the area are the Djab Wurrung.

== History ==
The Rural City of Ararat was formed in 1994 from the amalgamation of the City of Ararat, Shire of Ararat, and the Armstrong district of the Shire of Stawell.

In January 1996, after a further Local Government Board review, the Rural City of Ararat gained about 500 km^{2} of farmland in the Wickliffe, Lake Bolac and Nerrin Nerrin districts from the Shire of Moyne and Shire of Southern Grampians.

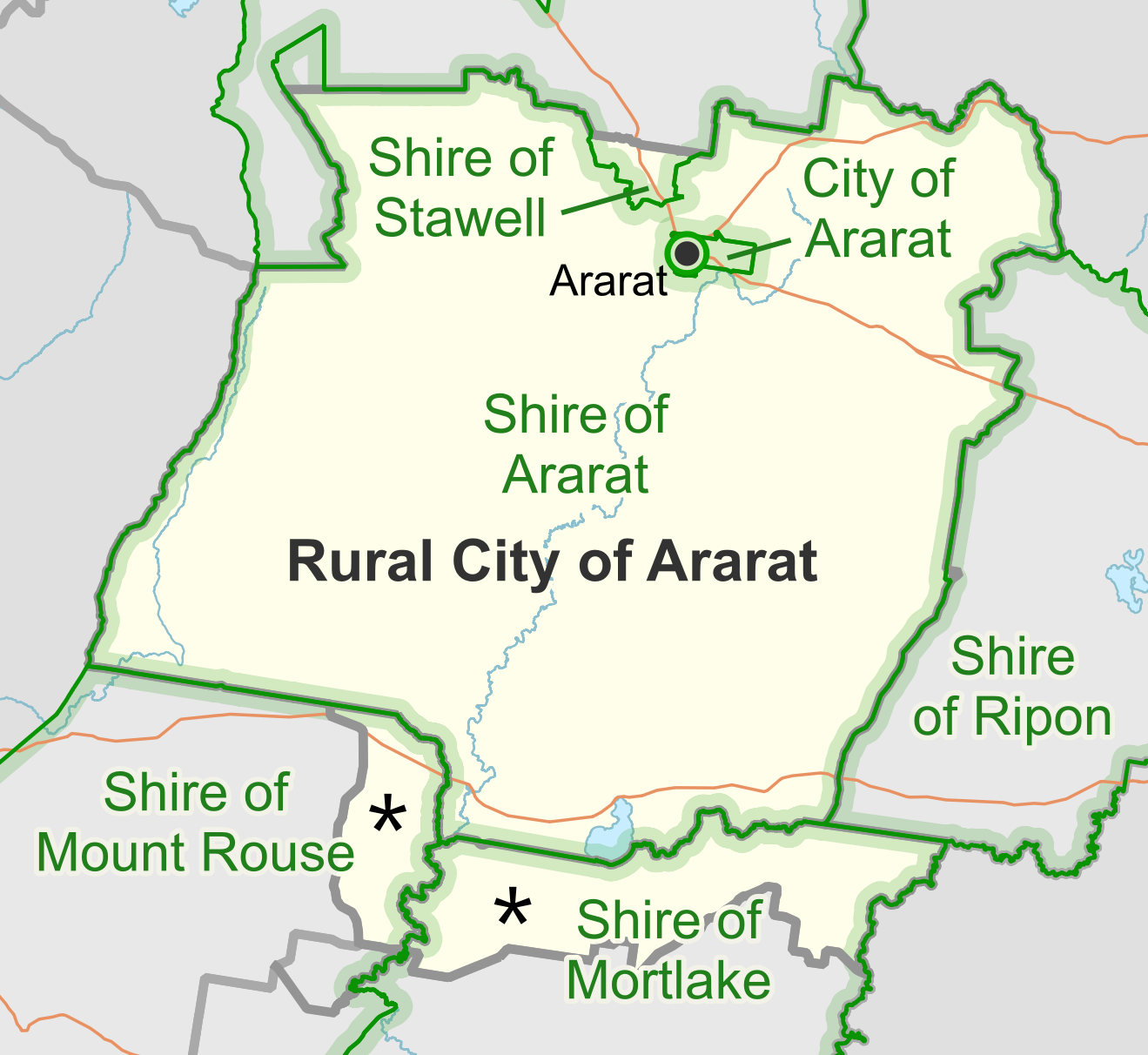
The Rural City's predecessor LGAs (green) as they were in 1994. The administrative centres of the former LGAs are marked by green dots. 🞲 Area annexed to the Rural City in 1996

== Council ==
=== Current composition ===
The council is composed of seven councillors elected to represent an unsubdivided municipality. Composition as of September 2022:

Ward	Councillor	Notes
Unsubdivided	Cr Gwenda Allgood	
Unsubdivided	Cr Jo Armstrong	Mayor
Unsubdivided	Cr Peter Beales	
Unsubdivided	Cr William Waterston	
Unsubdivided	Cr Bob Sanders	Deputy Mayor
Unsubdivided	Cr Henry Burridge	
Unsubdivided	Cr Rob Armstrong	

=== Administration and governance ===
The Ararat Rural City Council meets on the third Tuesday of each month at 6pm in the Council Chamber at the Ararat Shire Hall, 239 Barkly Street, Ararat. The Ararat Municipal Offices, 59 Vincent Street, Ararat, is the location of the council's administrative activities. It also provides customer services at this location and is open from 8.15am to 5.15pm on week days.

== Election results ==
=== 2024 ===
2024 Victorian local elections: Ararat
Party	Candidate	Votes	%	±%
Independent National	Jo Armstrong (elected 1)	1,757	26.51	−11.98
Independent	Teli Kaur (elected 3)	743	11.21	
Independent	Bob Sanders (elected 2)	688	10.38	+0.22
Independent	Luke Matthew Preston (elected 5)	663	10.00	
Independent	Peter Joyce (elected 4)	592	8.93	
Independent	Amanda Mead	497	7.50	
Independent	Bill Waterston (elected 6)	486	7.33	−4.65
Independent	Rob Armstrong (elected 7)	343	5.18	+1.08
Independent	Daryl Scherger	286	4.32	
Independent	Osman Kokcu	258	3.89	
Independent	Peter Beales	180	2.72	−1.69
Victorian Socialists	Fiona Tipping	134	2.02	
Total formal votes		6,627	95.22	+0.68
Informal votes		333	4.78	−0.68
Turnout		6,960	83.54	−0.26

=== 2020 ===
2020 Victorian local elections: Ararat
Party	Candidate	Votes	%	±%
Independent National	Jo Armstrong (elected 1)	2,770	38.49	
Independent	William Waterston (elected 3)	862	11.98	
Independent	Bob Sanders (elected 4)	731	10.16	
Independent	Gwenda Allgood (elected 6)	538	7.48	
Independent	Henry Burridge (elected 5)	537	7.46	
Independent	Neil Manning	351	4.88	
Independent	Peter Beales (elected 2)	317	4.41	
Independent	Rob Armstrong (elected 7)	295	4.10	
Independent	Jane Goninon	284	3.95	
Independent	Colin McKenzie	212	2.95	
Independent	Bernardine Atkinson	165	2.29	
Independent	Cecilia Fresle	134	1.86	
Total formal votes		7,196	95.90	
Informal votes		308	4.10	
Turnout		7,504	83.80	

== Townships and localities ==
The 2021 census, the rural city had a population of 11,880 up from 11,600 in the 2016 census

Population
Locality	2016	2021
Ararat	8,297	8,500
Armstrong	88	90
Ballyrogan	67	77
Bayindeen	21	22
Black Range^	189	274
Bornes Hill	30	33
Buangor^	103	112
Carranballac^	42	43
Cathcart	91	110
Chatsworth^	44	49
Crowlands^	89	72
Denicull Creek	27	19
Dobie	42	33
Dunkeld^	678	688
Dunneworthy^	19	15
Elmhurst^	183	185
Eversley^	10	14
Glenlogie^	33	29
Glenthompson^	232	256
Great Western^	400	425
Halls Gap^	430	495
Lake Bolac	330	368
Langi Logan	25	23
Mafeking	19	20
Maroona	110	80
Middle Creek^	19	22
Mininera	62	51
Mount Cole	21	21
Mount Cole Creek	5	10
Moyston	348	403
Narrapumelap South	30	31
Nerrin Nerrin^	38	48
Norval	38	40
Pomonal^	322	356
Pura Pura^	37	47
Rhymney	60	56
Rocky Point	0	4
Rossbridge	32	27
Stavely	37	47
Stoneleigh^	45	45
Streatham^	156	158
Tatyoon	130	130
Warrak	66	68
Westmere	40	62
Wickliffe	113	123
Willaura	530	439
Willaura North	30	33
Woorndoo^	169	160
Yalla-Y-Poora	16	13

^ - Territory divided with another LGA

== See also ==
- List of places of worship in the Rural City of Ararat
- List of localities (Victoria)
- Australian gold rushes
