= Armstrong, Victoria =

Armstrong
- Town
- Coordinates: 37°12′49″S 142°53′34″E
- Country: Australia
- State: Victoria
- LGA: Rural City of Ararat
- Location: 217 km (135 mi) W of Melbourne; 102 km (63 mi) W of Ballarat; 10 km (6.2 mi) NW of Ararat

Government
  - State electorate: Ripon
  - Federal division: Wannon

Population
  - Total: 90 (2021 census)
- Postcode: 3377

Armstrong (also known as Armstrongs) is a town in Victoria, Australia, located on the Western Highway, north of Ararat, in the local government area of Rural City of Ararat.

The population at the 2021 census was 90.

The town began as a gold-mining settlement, with a Post Office (Armstrong's) opening on 1 January 1859, and had a peak population of 516.

The Melbourne to Adelaide railway passes through the town. In 1938, Armstrong was the site of an experimental installation of a radical form of railway safeworking intended to bring about cost savings. It resulted in seven years of tortuous bureaucratic decision making.
