= Lake Bolac =

- Town
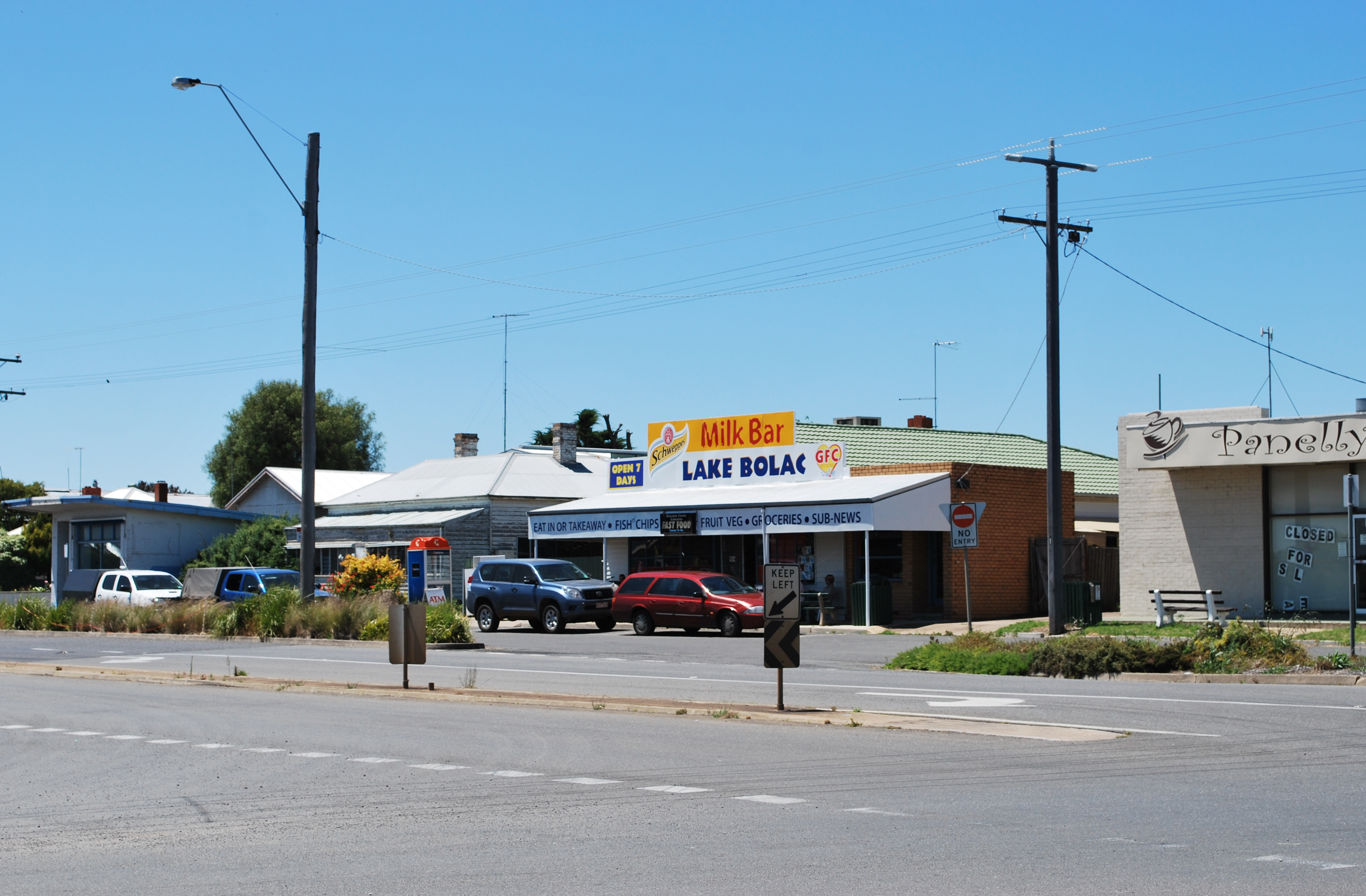
- Main street of Lake Bolac

- Coordinates: 37°42′0″S 142°51′0″E
- Country: Australia
- State: Victoria
- LGA: Rural City of Ararat
- Location: 217 km (135 mi) W of Melbourne; 91 km (57 mi) W of Ballarat; 50 km (31 mi) S of Ararat; 47 km (29 mi) W of Skipton; 48 km (30 mi) E of Dunkeld

Government
  - State electorate: Lowan
  - Federal division: Wannon

Population
  - Total: 368 (2021 census)
- Postcode: 3351

Lake Bolac is a town in the Western District region of Victoria, Australia. The town is on the shores of Lake Bolac, and the Glenelg Highway passes through the town. At the 2021 census, Lake Bolac and the surrounding area had a population of 368.

The name derives from bulluc, meaning swamp or lake in the Djab Wurrung language. The traditional owners of the area are the Girai wurrung people.

== History ==
=== Pre-colonial inhabitation ===
Lake Bolac was the northern boundary of the Girai wurrung people's traditional lands, according to Norman Tindale, while large groups of up to 1,000 Djab wurrung and other peoples gathered here for a couple of months during the annual short-finned eel migration. George Augustus Robinson recorded in 1841 that 800 Aboriginal people had gathered at Lake Bolac – 'Lake Boloke' – to feast on plentiful eels, when "...local tribes numbered only sixty individuals".

The name of the lake and thence the town derives from bulluc, meaning swamp or lake in the Djab Wurrung language.

Anthropologist Harry Lourandos noted evidence of semi-permanent settlement near the lake.

=== European settlement ===
Lake Bolac Post Office opened on 1 November 1864.

=== 2006 tornado ===
On the night of 19 January 2006, Lake Bolac was hit by what has been described as a "mini-twister". Power lines were torn down; several buildings sustained mild to severe damage, more than 100 trees were uprooted, and eight grain silos were damaged or destroyed. Around 400 residents lost power due to the tornado, and the damage bill was estimated at A$2m.

== Location ==
Lake Bolac is in the Western District region of Victoria, within the local government area of the Rural City of Ararat, 91 kilometres (57 mi) west of Ballarat. The town is situated on the shores of Lake Bolac, and the Glenelg Highway passes through the town.

== Facilities and places of interest ==
The Lake Bolac stone arrangement is an Aboriginal ceremonial site near the town, shaped like a giant stone eel.

Lake Bolac has a prep to year 12 school.

There is a caravan park on the lake that is popular in summer with holidaying families.

== Recreation ==
The freshwater lake is popular with anglers.

The football team, in partnership with the nearby town of Wickliffe, competes as the Magpies in the Mininera & District Football League.

The Lake Bolac Golf Club is on Mortlake Road.

== Demographics ==
At the 2021 census, Lake Bolac and the surrounding area had a population of 368.

The language spoken by the traditional owners of the area is Djab Wurrung language.
