= Rossbridge =

- Town
- Coordinates: 37°29′S 142°51′E
- Country: Australia
- State: Victoria
- LGA: Rural City of Ararat
- Location: 229 km (142 mi) W of Melbourne; 103 km (64 mi) E of Hamilton, Victoria; 25 km (16 mi) S of Ararat

Government
  - State electorate: Ripon

Population
  - Total: 27 (2021 census)
- Postcode: 3378

Rossbridge is a town in the north west region of Victoria, Australia. It is approximately 229 kilometres (142 mi) west of the state's capital, Melbourne. Rossbridge has a population of 27, as of the 2021 Census.

Established on the Ararat to coast road in the 1860s, the town gained its name from Ross's Bridge at the crossing of the Hopkins River. the bridge gained its name from named in turn after John Ross, selector of the Mount William Plains pastoral run. By the 1870s a church, school and a number of residences were established. Ross Bridge Post Office opened on 21 November 1873 and closed in on 2 March 1962. As an early grazing district, the town had its share of tragedy, with four children dying in a house fire on 9 February 1863. Rossbridge Primary School #1069 opened 19 February 1872 and closed 31 December 1993.

== Notable people ==
- Australian politician John McDougall attended Rossbridge Common School, later becoming a staunch anticapitalist and anti war campaigner.
