= Pomonal =

- Town
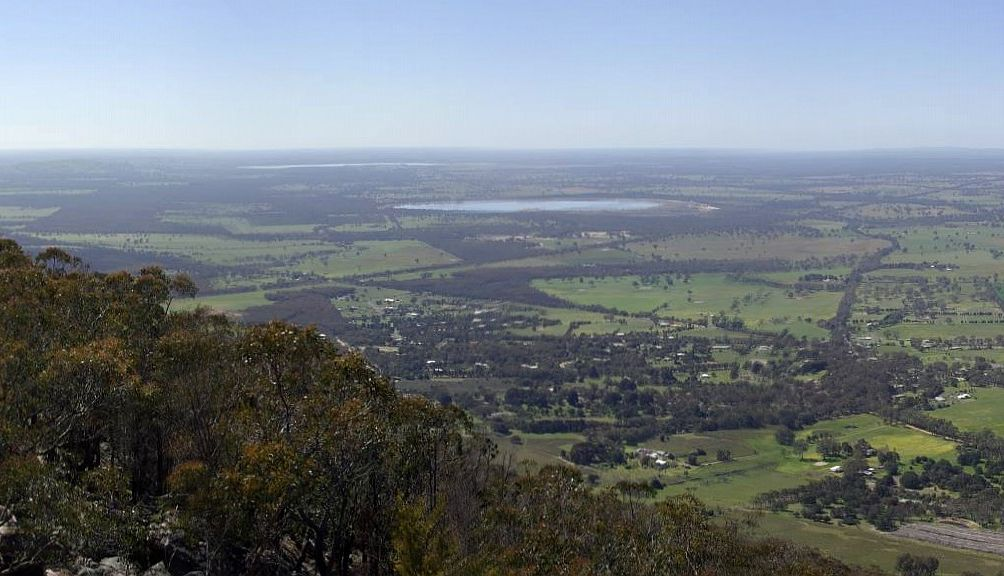
- Pomonal as seen from Mount Cassel

- Coordinates: 37°11′32″S 142°36′32″E
- Country: Australia
- State: Victoria
- LGA: Rural City of Ararat
- Location: 245 km (152 mi) NW of Melbourne; 132 km (82 mi) W of Ballarat; 39 km (24 mi) W of Ararat

Government
  - State electorate: Ripon
  - Federal division: Wannon

Population
  - Total: 356 (2021 census)
- Postcode: 3381

Pomonal is a town in western Victoria, Australia within the Rural City of Ararat local government area, 245 kilometres (152 mi) north west of the state capital, Melbourne. At the 2021 census, Pomonal had a population of 356.

== History ==
Reflecting the many orchards in the area at the time, the town was originally named Pomona after the Roman goddess. As a result of another town in Australia with the same name, this was changed in 1904 to Pomonal. The Post Office reflected this change opening as Pomona on 25 December 1892 (closing 1895), re-opening as Mona on 1 August 1904 then being renamed Pomonal on 10 October 1904.

Thomas Mitchell was the first European explorer in the Pomonal area, camping near the future town site in 1836 before climbing Mount William in the nearby Grampians mountain range. Squatters soon followed and the town site was part of the "Lexington Run". In 1866, the Frenchman Peter DeMay was the first selector in the area, developing an orchard and small vineyard. The fruit industry developed from the 1890s, reaching a peak around 1913. From 1920, tobacco growing started in the area. The Black Friday bushfires of 1939 destroyed many of the orchards and tobacco properties. Today, while there is one remaining commercial orchard, Pomonal is mainly a grazing district.

In 2006 Pomonal narrowly escaped the disastrous Mount Lubra bushfire. Due to the relentless efforts of residents and fire fighting crews from New South Wales, Tasmania and Victoria the town remained a green island in the 130,000 hectares of land blackened by the fire.

In February 2024 46 homes in the town were destroyed by a bushfire that moved through Pomonal. The bushfire began in the nearby Grampians National Park on a day classed as catastrophic fire conditions and swept down into the township. Recovery efforts are ongoing.

== Transport ==
The town is located on the C222 between Ararat and Halls Gap. Pomonal is serviced by V/Line with an inter-town bus service operating three times a week between Warrnambool and Ararat.

== Other services ==
The township, due to its vicinity to both the Grampians and Ararat, is seen as a good location to live, with larger rural blocks and hobby farms, and a 20–30-minute commute to Ararat or Stawell.

It has a primary school (established in 1887 with the original building still used as a multi purpose room) and a general store and post office.
