= Tatyoon =

- Town
- Coordinates: 37°31′S 142°56′E
- Country: Australia
- State: Victoria
- LGA: Rural City of Ararat
- Location: 215 km (134 mi) W of Melbourne; 98 km (61 mi) E of Ballarat; 33 km (21 mi) S of Ararat

Government
  - State electorate: Ripon

Population
  - Total: 130 (2021 census)
- Postcode: 3378

Tatyoon is a small town in the western region of Victoria. It is approximately 215 kilometres (134 mi) west of the state's capital, Melbourne. At the 2021 Census, Tatyoon had a population of 130. The name comes from an Aboriginal word meaning "Water Catchment"

The local football team, Tatyoon Hawks are a part of the Mininera & District Football League. They won the 1998, 2006, 2007, 2008, 2011, 2016 and 2023 premierships.

Tatyoon Post Office opened on 1 January 1867 and closed in May 1994

In 2023, Tatyoon was featured in a series of videos produced by Worksafe Victoria promoting farm safety.

== Notable people ==
- David Astbury - AFL player, originally played for Tatyoon Hawks

== See also ==
- Yalla-Y-Poora
