= Wickliffe, Victoria =

Wickliffe
- Town
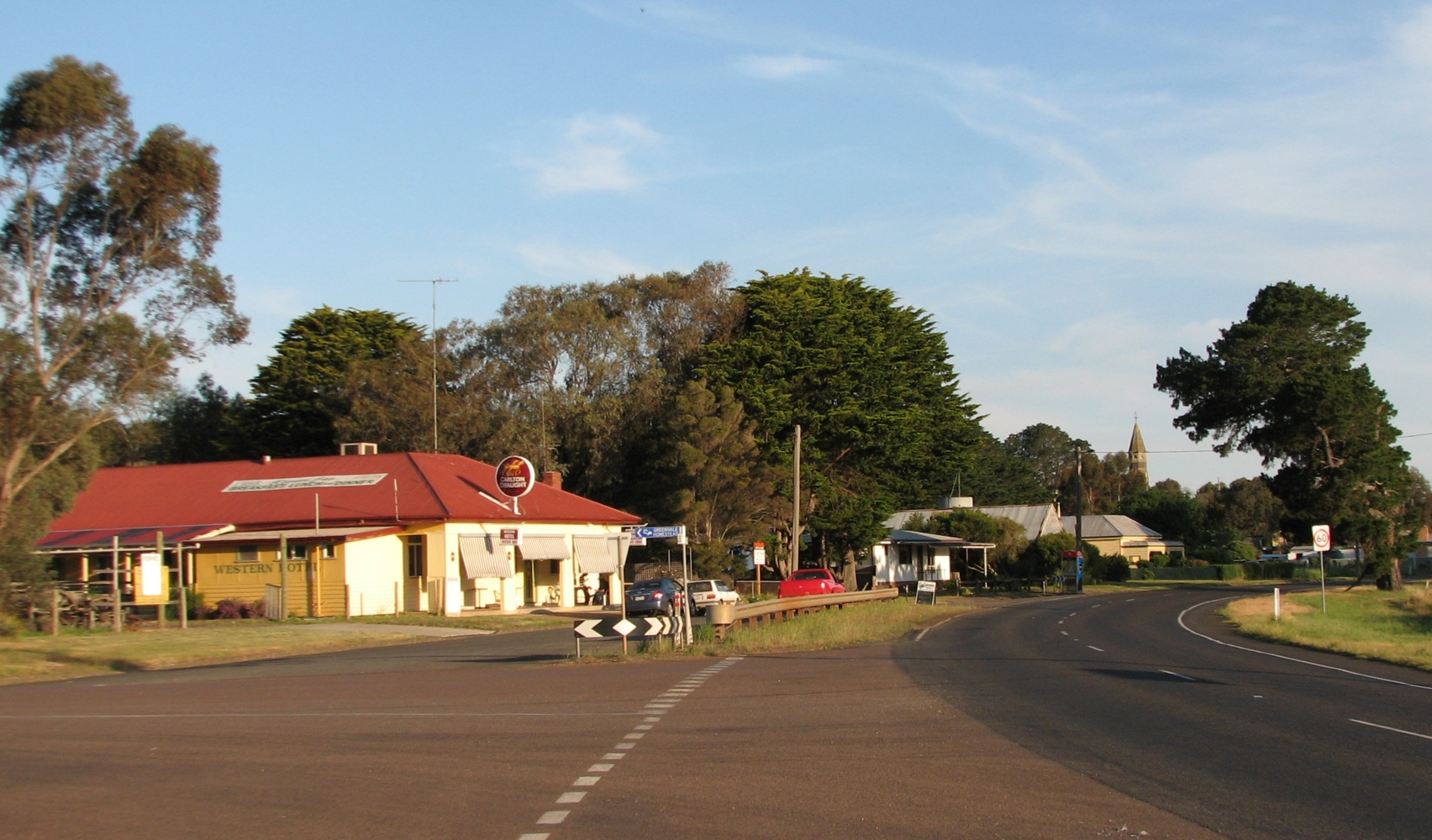
- The western approach to Wickliffe, 2009

- Coordinates: 37°41′S 142°43′E
- Country: Australia
- State: Victoria
- LGA: Rural City of Ararat

Government
  - State electorate: Lowan
  - Federal division: Wannon

Population
  - Total: 123 (2021 census)
- Postcode: 3379

Wickliffe is a small town in the Rural City of Ararat local government area in western Victoria, Australia. At the 2021 census, Wickliffe and the surrounding area had a population of 123.

== History ==
In 1840 John Dickson Wyselaskie (1818-1883) took up the 'Narrapumelap' pastoral run in the Wickliffe district. In 1843 an Irishman named John Farrell established a public-house, the Hopkins Inn, at a crossing-place on the Hopkins River. The location was known by several names – Ford's Crossing, Hopkins Crossing and Farrell's Inn.

By 1850 the settlement on the Hopkins River had been named Wickliffe. Town lots at Wickliffe were offered for sale in August 1853, with lots being purchased by the local land-holder Wyselaskie and inn-keeper Farrell.

The first Presbyterian minister, Rev. John McLachlan, was appointed to the district in 1851. McLachlan lived on 'Narrapumelap' station and ministered at Wickliffe, Hopkins Hill and Dunkeld until 1856. Services were initially conducted in the Hopkins Hotel at Wickliffe.

In January 1854 a post-office briefly opened at Wickliffe, but closed later in the year. In March 1856 the Wickliffe post-office was re-opened, serving the township and district residents until it closed in April 1988.

A public school was opened at Wickliffe in 1858. By the early 1860s Wyselaskie's property holdings in the district encompassed 105 square kilometres.

The local Presbyterian congregation raised one thousand pounds and obtained a government grant to build a church. A substantial Gothic-style bluestone Presbyterian church was opened in May 1861, with Rev. Edward Blair as minister. A 70-foot high steeple and bell-tower was added to the building in 1878 with funds provided by the local landholder J. D. Wyselaskie.

In April 1877 the Ararat to Hamilton railway branch line was opened as far as Dunkeld. The section of line included a station 10.5 miles (17 kilometres) north of Wickliffe, known as the Wickliffe Road station.

From 1873 to 1878 J. D. Wyselaskie built the Narrapumelap homestead, a bluestone French Gothic-revival mansion, south-west of the township on his pastoral station.

In August 1880 the body of a man was found in a paddock at Reedy Creek, about seven miles north-west of Wickliffe. The man, later identified as Michael Quinlivan, had been killed by a blow to the back of his head. Police investigations later revealed Quinlivan had been murdered by his companion, Robert Francis Burns, who was convicted of the crime in July 1883. Before his execution in September 1883 Burns made a hasty confession to the hangman, indicating Quinlivan's murder was just one of eight murders he had committed.

In September 1901 Wickliffe township had only one store and one hotel. The only church in the township was Presbyterian.

A public hall was built at Wickliffe in 1912.

After World War II a section of the 'Narrapumelap' estate was subdivided to form 22 soldier-settler farms.

The Wickliffe public school was closed in 1987.

== Narrapumelap homestead ==
The restored Narrapumelap homestead, registered on the National and Victorian heritage registers, is a major tourist attraction nearby to Wickliffe, south-west of the township. The grand bluestone mansion was built between 1873 and 1878 by the pastoralist John Dickson Wyselaskie. The homestead, in the French Gothic-revival style, was designed by the architectural firm of Davidson and Henderson. It is a single-storied building, asymmetrically assembled with a central projecting gabled wing, turret and tower. Fifty stonemasons were employed to build the bluestone structure. The surrounding grounds and garden included a mile-long (1.6 km) tree-lined avenue.

When Wyselaskie died in 1883 'Narrapumelap' station was purchased by the pastoralist, Gerald Neville Buckley. In 1951 the McIntyre family acquired 'Narrapumelap'. Wyselaskie's bluestone homestead fell into disrepair during this period. By 1987 the homestead was derelict, but remained structurally sound. The Hamilton branch of the National Trust organised two open days at 'Narrapumelap' which inspired Kevin McIntyre to begin the restoration of Narrapumelap homestead and its garden. The house and grounds were re-opened to the public in 1995. In November 2017 a new roof was installed on the tower (in the style of the original design).

Accommodation is available at the restored homestead, in an apartment located in the west wing of the mansion.

== Sport ==
The local football team, combined with players from nearby Lake Bolac, is known as the Magpies and plays in the Mininera & District Football League.
