= Moyston =

- Town
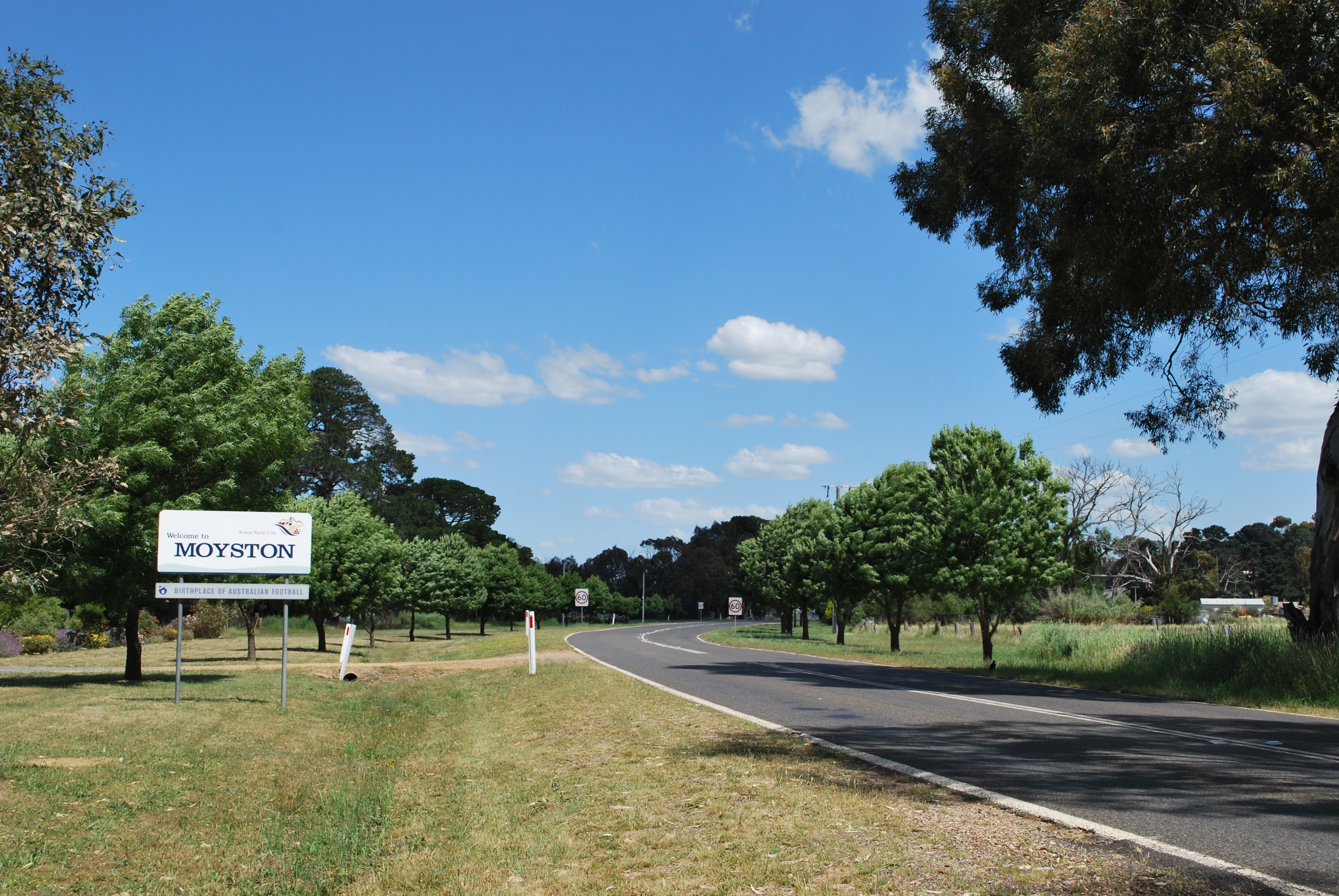
- Approaching Moyston

- Coordinates: 37°18′0″S 142°46′0″E
- Country: Australia
- State: Victoria
- LGA: Rural City of Ararat
- Location: 224 km (139 mi) NW of Melbourne; 110 km (68 mi) W of Ballarat; 17 km (11 mi) W of Ararat
- Established: 1857

Government
  - State electorate: Lowan
  - Federal division: Wannon

Population
  - Total: 403 (2021 census)
- Postcode: 3377

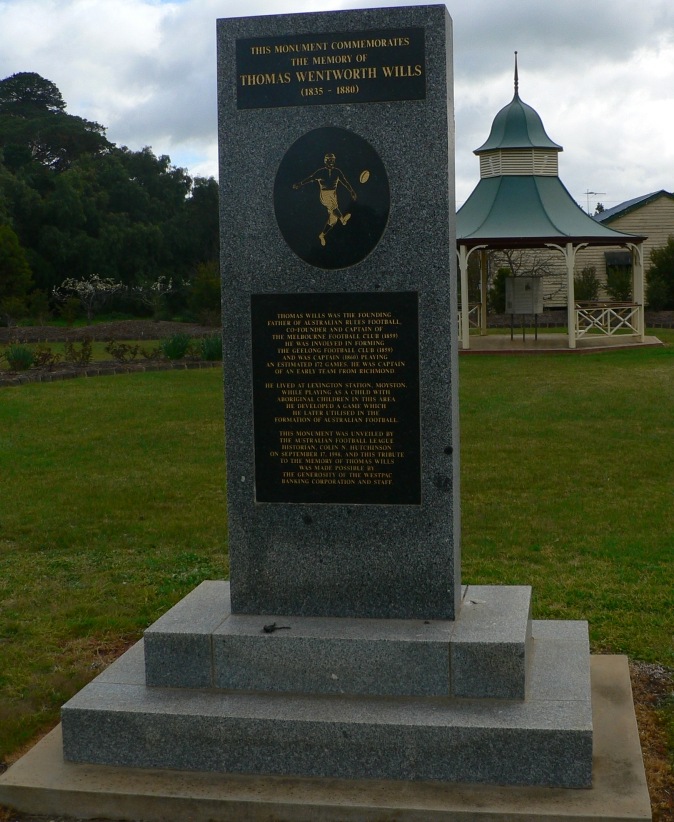
Monument and pavilion to Tom Wills, inventor of Australian Football

Moyston is a town in the Western District region of Victoria, Australia, near the Grampians mountain range. The town is located in the Rural City of Ararat local government area, 224 kilometres (139 mi) north west of the state capital, Melbourne. At the 2021 census, Moyston and the surrounding area had a population of 403.

Moyston is the self-proclaimed "Birthplace of Australian Football", based on its connection to the sport's founder, Tom Wills, who grew up in the area in the 1840s, and, according to some, played Marn Grook with the Indigenous people of the area.

== History ==
The first European to see the Moyston area was the explorer Major Thomas Mitchell in 1836. Squatters and their flocks of sheep followed soon after, among them Horatio Wills. His son, Tom Wills, was Australia's first great cricketer and a pioneer of Australian rules football. It has been claimed that, while living in the Moyston area, Wills witnessed or played Marn Grook, an Aboriginal football game that inspired his laws for Australian football. The discovery of gold in 1857 started a small gold rush and the establishment of a township. The Post Office opened on 19 March 1860 as Campbell's Reef and was renamed Moyston in 1866. In 1861, a formal survey of the township was made and blocks offered for sale. By then, the town included two churches, three hotels and a police station.

By 1880, mining in the area had declined and vineyards and orchards were established along with dairying and grazing on newly developed selections. The last mine in the area, the "Golden Gate", ceased operation by around 1910.

== The Town today ==
Today, Moyston is an historic town surrounded by farming properties and where workers employed in the nearby towns of Great Western, Ararat, Stawell, and Halls Gap, reside. Several public businesses operate in and near the town which included the post office, the general store and Clayfield Winery. The town shares an Australian rules football team with nearby Willaura, the Moyston-Willaura Pumas, competing in the Mininera & District Football League.
