= Buangor =

Buangor Victoria
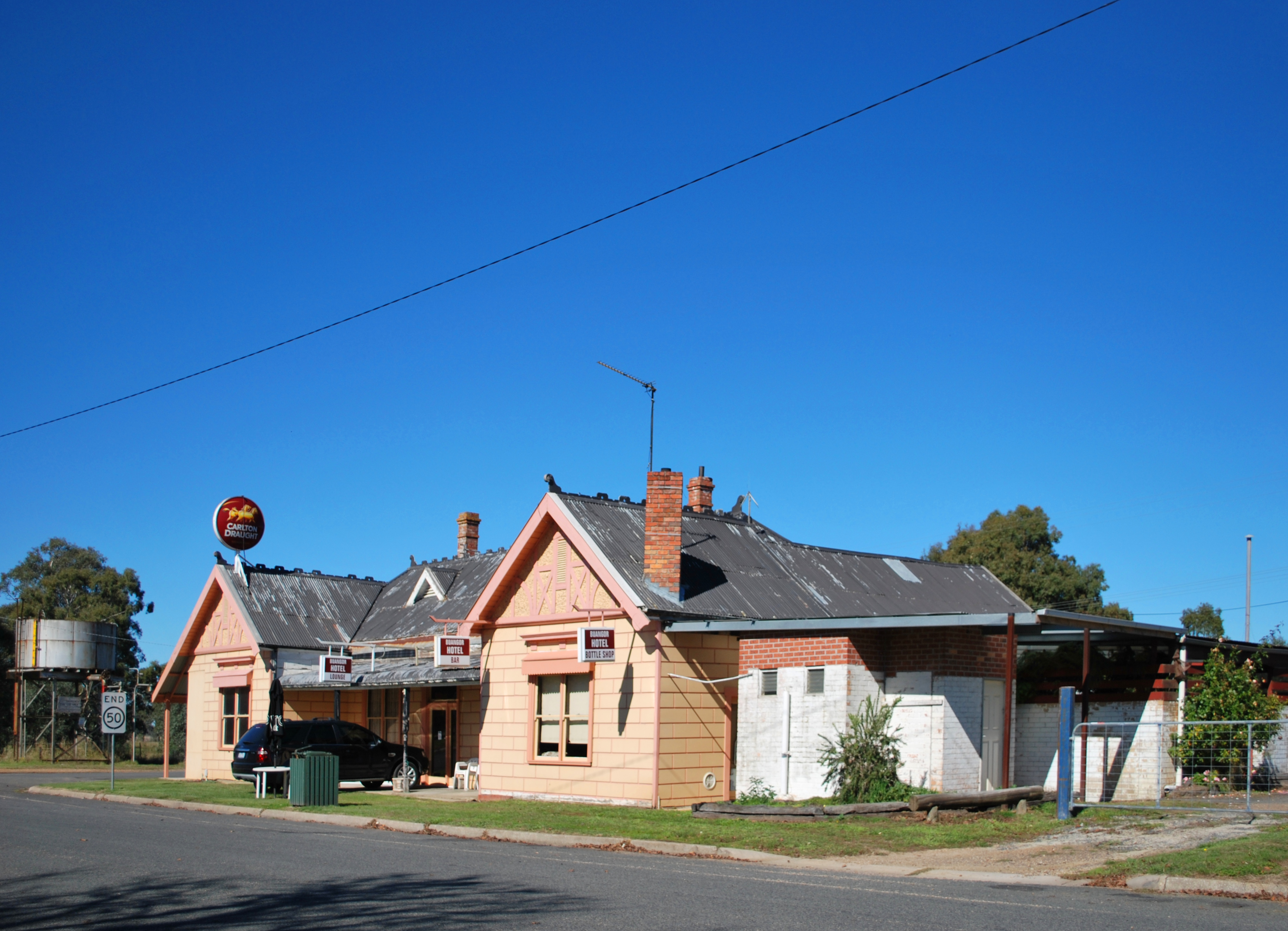
- Buangor Hotel

- Coordinates: 37°22′S 143°10′E
- Population: 112 (2021 census)
- Postcode(s): 3375
- Location: 181 km (112 mi) W of Melbourne; 68 km (42 mi) W of Ballarat; 23 km (14 mi) S of Ararat
- LGA(s): Rural City of Ararat
- State electorate(s): Ripon
- Federal division(s): Wannon

Buangor /bjuˈæŋɡə/ is a town in western Victoria. It is about 181 kilometres (112 mi) west of the state capital, Melbourne. At the 2021 census, Buangor had a population of 112.

Buangor Post Office opened on 25 March 1863.

The town has a primary school, which was built in 1878, and had an enrolment of 19 students in 2011.

Buangor railway station, on the Ararat railway line, was closed in 1981.

The area was known as the Parish of Woodnaccerak (also spelled Woodnaggerak) in the County of Ripon and was established in the 1830s, and is remembered by a north–south road named Woodnaggerak in the district.

The local grazing property "Woodnaggerak" was the home of General Sir Cyril Brudenell Bingham White, KCB, KCMG, KCVO, DSO, Chief of the General Staff 1920–23 to which he commuted at weekends from Melbourne. He was recalled to the role in early 1940, until killed soon after in the Canberra air disaster.
