= Dunkeld, Victoria =

Dunkeld
- Town
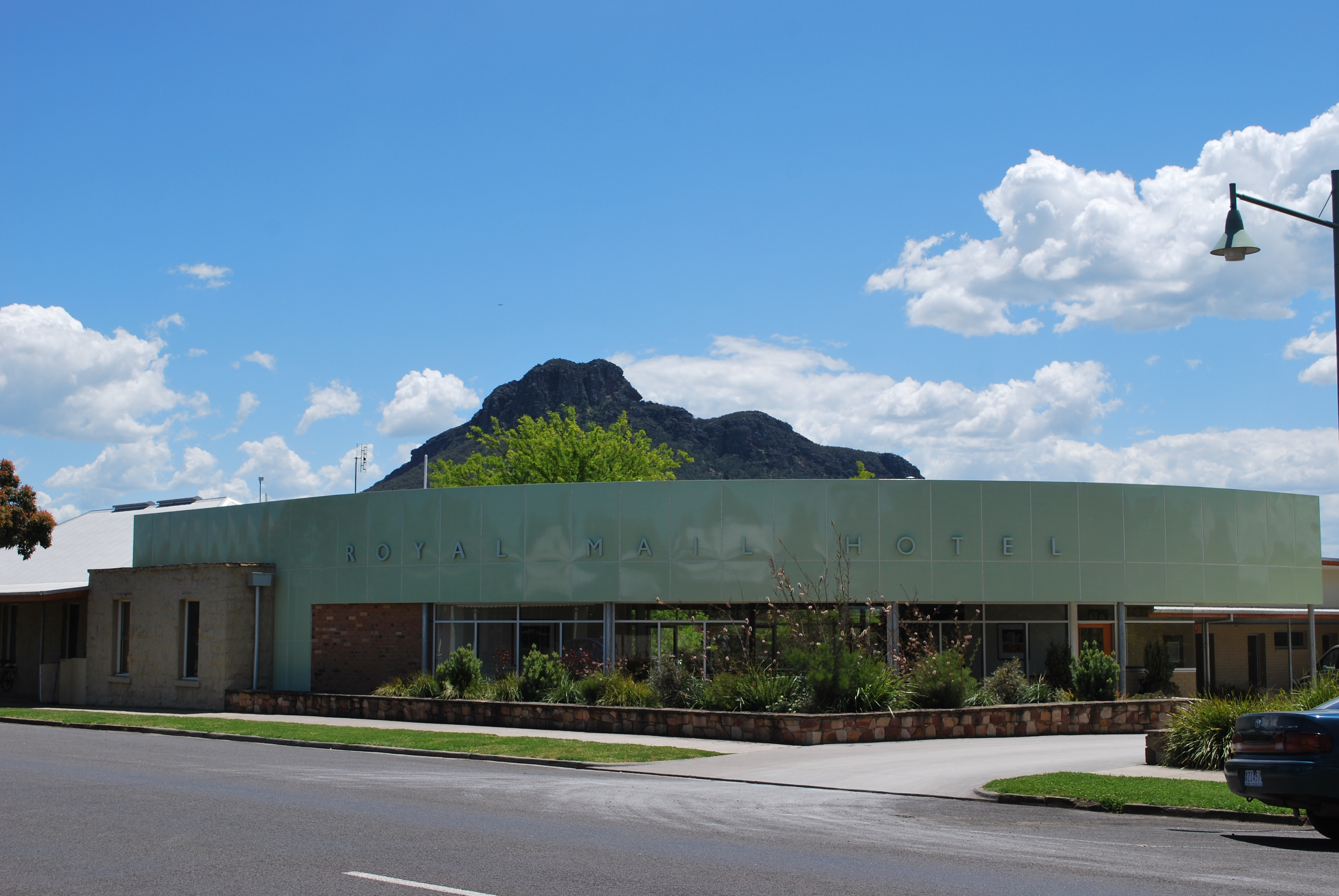
- Royal Mail Hotel with the Grampians in the background

- Coordinates: 37°39′0″S 142°21′0″E
- Country: Australia
- State: Victoria
- LGA: Shire of Southern Grampians
- Location: 283 km (176 mi) W of Melbourne; 147 km (91 mi) W of Ballarat; 76 km (47 mi) SW of Ararat; 33 km (21 mi) NE of Hamilton; 95 km (59 mi) W of Skipton

Government
  - State electorate: Lowan
  - Federal division: Wannon
- Elevation: 252 m (827 ft)

Population
  - Total: 688 (2021 census)
- Postcode: 3294

Dunkeld is a town in Victoria, Australia, at the southern end of the Grampians National Park, in the Shire of Southern Grampians. It is approx 283 km west of Melbourne on the Glenelg Highway. The town's population is holding steady but aging. At the 2021 census, Dunkeld had a population of 688.

The Djab wurrung people lived in this region to the south and east of the Grampians for over 4,000 years prior to the arrival of the Europeans. The first pastoralists took up properties in the late 1830s and there was a decade of sometimes violent clashes with the Djab wurrung. A small township developed which was initially known as Mount Sturgeon, after the European name for the mount behind the town. A post office of that name opened on 1 July 1852 (Dunkeld from 1 January 1854); but, as the early settlers were predominantly Scottish, it was renamed Dunkeld after a Scottish town which was the principal locality of the Caledonian picts in Roman times.

At a strategic point south of the Grampians for road traffic and surrounded by fine wool producing country, Dunkeld thrived in the mid-19th century. The Robertson's Woolpack Inn was the first building to be erected in 1845, followed by five other hotels – the Shamrock and the Western, the Royal Mail, the Collins Railway Hotel and the Family Inn. Road traffic declined with the opening of the railway (1877 to Hamilton and Ararat, with another short-lived line going south to Penshurst). Louis Buvelot, Eugene von Guerard and Nicholas Chevalier all made paintings of the district, where Mt Murdadjoog (Mt Abrupt) and Mt Wurgarri (Mt Sturgeon) provide a backdrop.

In January 1944, fires destroyed one-third of Dunkeld's houses and only the Royal Mail Hotel remains from the five original establishments. Today Dunkeld contains two upmarket restaurants and ample accommodation. There is also a general store, bakery with accommodation, five cafes, post office, art gallery, gift shop, petrol station, pharmacy, primary school, childcare centre, local museum, bookshop, (sandstone) stonemason and a hardware store, tourist information centre and two churches. Residents access most other services they need in Hamilton but the railway line has been closed for some years. Wool and hay production continues on the surrounding farms. The timber industry has now ceased, but there is at least one local vineyard. There is a caravan park with campsites and a variety of other tourist accommodation, and tourism is now the main employer. A 40-ha property, "Heathlands", was owned by naturalist Graham Pizzey, author of A Field Guide to the Birds of Australia.

Dunkeld has a horse racing club, the Dunkeld Racing Club, which runs the Dunkeld Cup meeting in November. The town, in conjunction with nearby township Glenthompson, has an Australian rules football team, called Glenthompson-Dunkeld, competing in the Mininera & District Football League. The team won the league's premiership in 2010. Golfers play at the Grampians Golf Club on Victoria Valley Road.

== See also ==
- Mount Sturgeon Homestead
