= Westmere, Victoria =

Westmere
- Town
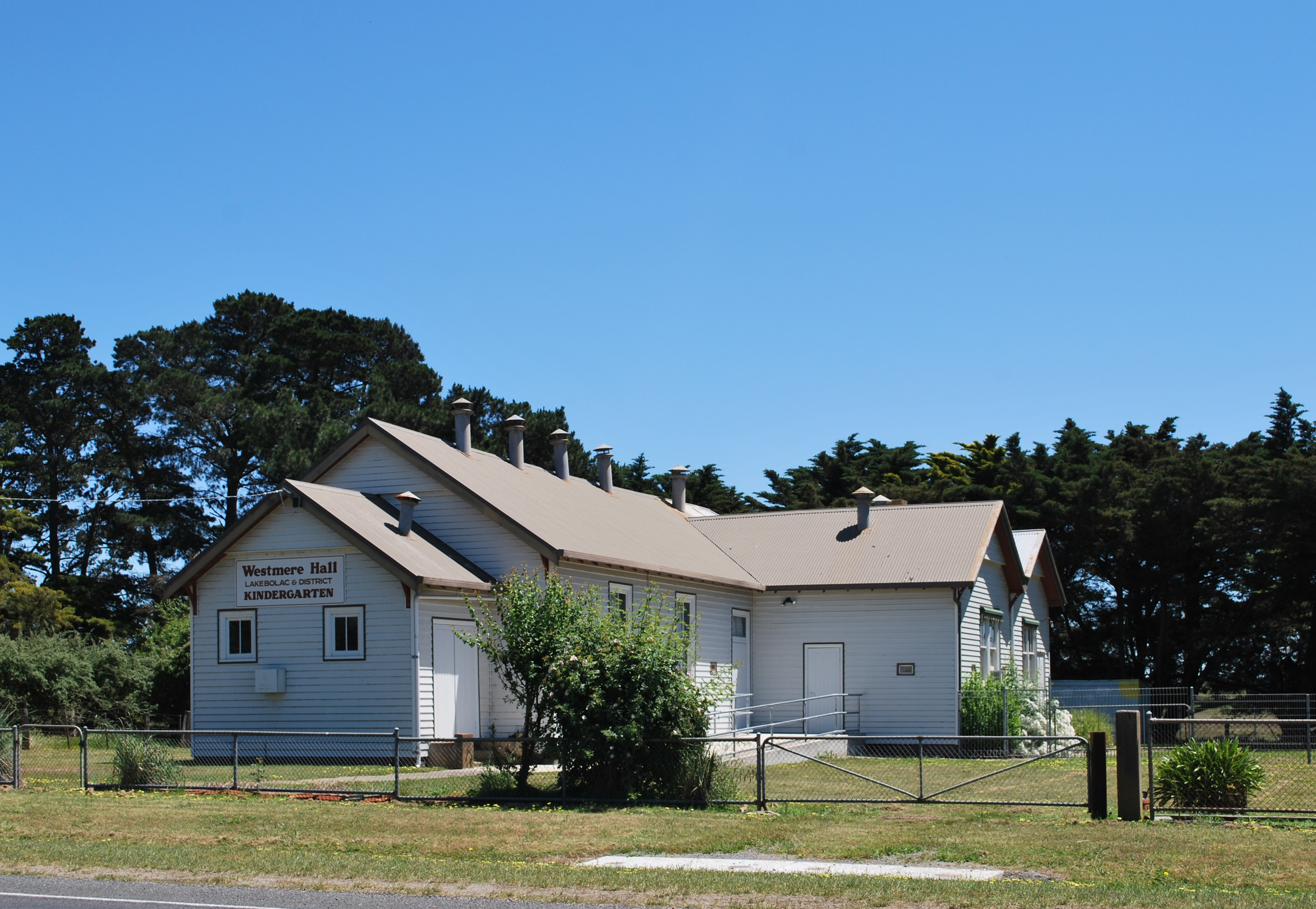
- Westmere Hall, 2010

- Coordinates: 37°41′21″S 142°58′02″E
- Country: Australia
- State: Victoria
- LGA(s): Rural City of Ararat
- Location: 203 km (126 mi) W of Melbourne; 85 km (53 mi) W of Ballarat; 50 km (31 mi) S of Ararat

Government
  - State electorate(s): Lowan
  - Federal division(s): Wannon

Population
  - Total(s): 62 (2021 census)
- Postcode: 3351

Westmere is a locality in south-west Victoria, Australia, in the Rural City of Ararat local government area, 215 kilometres (134 mi) west of the state capital, Melbourne.

At the 2021 census, Westmere had a population of 62.
