= Narrapumelap =

Historic homestead in Victoria, Australia

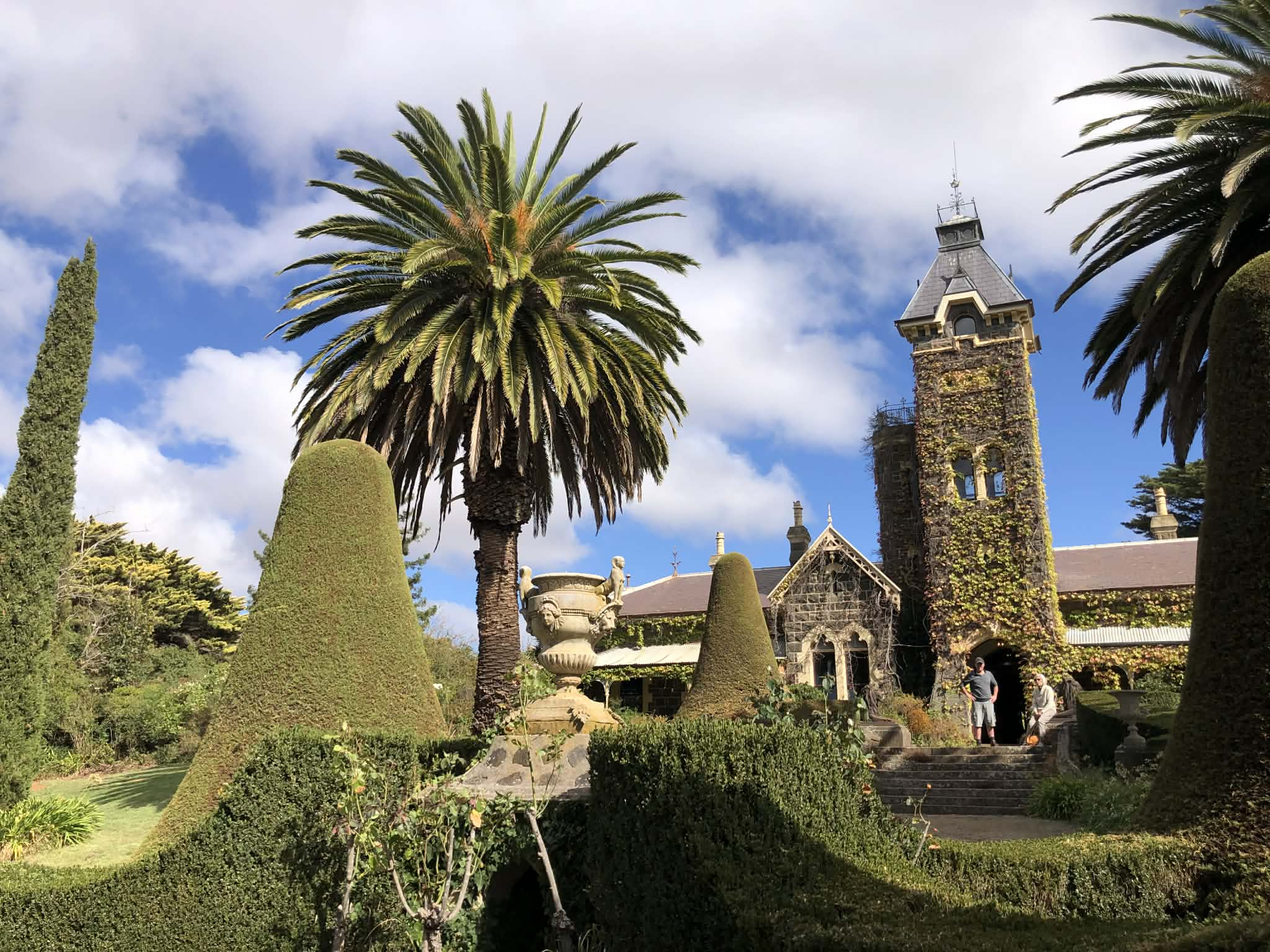
- Narrapumelap Homestead, April 20, 2025

- Location in the Rural City of Ararat, Victoria
- 37°42′9.3″S 142°42′40.1″E
- Type: Homestead, associated built facilities and grounds
- Location: Wickliffe, Victoria, Australia
- Nearest city: Ararat

History
- Built: 1878
- Built for: John Dickson Wyselaskie

Site notes
- Architect(s): George Henderson and Alexander Davidson
- Architectural style: French Neo-Gothic

Victorian Heritage Register
- Official name: Narrapumelap Homestead
- Type: State heritage (built and natural)
- Designated: 4 May 1981
- Reference no.: H0492

Narrapumelap is a historic homestead and estate located immediately outside of Wickliffe in the Western District, 50.5 km southwest of Ararat, Victoria, Australia. Built in the French Gothic-revival style, the property features an asymmetrical design with a central gabled wing, turret and tower, and extensive gardens and parklands dating from the late 19th century. Originally constructed as the pastoral home of John Dickson Wyselaskie, Narrapumelap is recognised for both its architectural significance and its role in the pastoral history of the district, and it is listed on the Victorian Heritage Register.

== History ==
The land that became Narrapumelap was first taken up as a pastoral run by John Dickson Wyselaskie in the 1840s. Wyselaskie was reputedly the illegitimate son of a Polish officer who was interned in Sanquhar in Scotland during the Napoleonic Wars, and his father was reputedly the son of the illegitimate son of the last king of Poland.

Wyselaskie initially lived in an upturned boat, before erecting a rudimentary homestead. The local Djab Wurrung Aboriginal people attacked this early homestead and massacred the sheep. In response, they were either driven off the run, or remained on the property, where they were taught how to be shearers and shepherds.

Wyselaskie named his property after an Aboriginal word associated with the Hopkins River region, and by the 1850s had established a large pastoral station in the district.

Between 1873 and 1878, Wyselaskie commissioned architects Davidson & Henderson to design and build the substantial bluestone homestead that stands today. The resulting mansion is an unusual and eclectic expression of French Gothic Revival architecture, featuring a central projecting wing, castellated tower, bay and bow windows, and decorative cast-iron verandahs. The surrounding estate also included extensive gardens and parkland laid out from its earliest years, making it one of the most impressive pastoral homesteads in rural Victoria by the late 19th century. Much of the stone was either quarried on site or from Waurn Ponds.

During the time of construction, John and his wife Mary Jane Austin Wyselaskie (née Farrell) travelled to Europe and the United Kingdom during 1874-1876.

Following Wyselaskie's death in 1883, the estate passed through different ownerships, including pastoralist Gerald Neville Buckley, the son of Mars Buckley (who went on to co-found Buckley & Nunn, which later became David Jones) and Elizabeth Marion Neville.

Gerald Buckley made several alterations to the house, including the construction of a brick dining room, and lowering the roof of the tower. The tower was then split into two rooms, the lower being a gunroom, and the upper a camera storage room and dark room. He also held property at Warrnambool, as well as 'Glencairn' (Nagambie), 'Rock House' (Kyneton), 'Manor House' (Werribee), 'Kulkurt', (Mininera), and 'Cowwar' (Lake Bolac).

Gerald died at the house in February 1935. When the funeral cortage left his house, it made a halt at the Wickliffe War Memorial, where 30 men, primarily past employees of his, held a service, conducted by Rev. L. Burgess of Willaura.

After the death of Gerald Buckley, the property then passed on to his brother Charles, until his death. Like many large pastoral holdings in Victoria after World War II, portions of the estate were subdivided for soldier settlement farms, leaving the homestead on a much reduced parcel of land. By 1951, when the McIntrye family bought the property at an auction, the mansion had fallen into a long state of disrepair and suffered from vandalism, and it was widely considered beyond restoration. The McIntyre family resided in a smaller, wooden house 300 metres down the hill for the time being.

The restoration of Narrapumelap has been a long-term project led by Kevin McIntyre, with significant effort and time dedicated to preserving and reviving both the house and its grounds. A key element of the restoration was the reconstruction of the homestead's original tower roof, removed in the early 20th century after storm damage. This was rebuilt in 2017 using historic photographs as a guide and restored the mansion's distinctive skyline feature. Extensive work has also been done on the surrounding gardens and parklands to reflect their 19th-century character, bringing back the estate's historic setting.

Today, Narrapumelap can be visited with guided tours and accommodation offered. The house is only opened for tours twice a year, on Easter Sunday and Monday, and the weekend before the Melbourne Cup.

== See also ==
- Berrambool
- Brie Brie
- Chatsworth House
- Salt Creek
