= Pterostylis conferta =

Leprechaun greenhood

Scientific classification
- Kingdom: Plantae
- Clade: Tracheophytes
- Clade: Angiosperms
- Clade: Monocots
- Order: Asparagales
- Family: Orchidaceae
- Subfamily: Orchidoideae
- Tribe: Cranichideae
- Genus: Pterostylis
- Species: P. conferta

Binomial name
- Pterostylis conferta (D.L.Jones) G.N.Backh.

Synonyms
- Hymenochilus confertus D.L.Jones & M.A.Clem.

Species of orchid

Pterostylis conferta, commonly known as the leprechaun greenhood or basalt midget greenhood, is a plant in the orchid family Orchidaceae and is endemic to Victoria.

== Description ==
Pterostylis conferta, is a terrestrial, perennial, deciduous, herb with an underground tuber. Non-flowering plants have a rosette of between five and ten, egg-shaped leaves, each leaf 5–25 mm (0.2–1 in) long and 3–8 mm (0.1–0.3 in) wide. Flowering plants have a similar rosette at the base of a flowering stem which is up to 160 mm (6 in) high with between five and sixteen crowded, pale green flowers with darker green stripes. The dorsal sepal and petals are joined to form a hood called the "galea" over the column and which curves forward and then downwards with a pointed tip. The lateral sepals are broadly egg-shaped, turn downwards and are 6–7 mm (0.2–0.3 in) long and wide. They are joined at their bases and their edges are rolled inwards. The labellum is about 3 mm (0.1 in) long and wide, pale green with a dark green appendage. Flowering occurs from October to January.

== Taxonomy and naming ==
The leprechaun greenhood was first formally described in 2009 by David Jones and given the name Hymenochilus confertus from a specimen collected near Woorndoo. The description was published in Orchadian. In 2010 Gary Backhouse changed the name to Pterostylis conferta. The specific epithet (conferta) is a Latin word meaning "pressed together", "crowded", "thick" or "dense".

== Distribution and habitat ==
Pterostylis conferta used to grow on basalt grassland but is now restricted to a single small population growing on a stony hill.

== Conservation ==
This greenhood orchid is classified as "threatened" under the Victorian Government Flora and Fauna Guarantee Act 1988.
