= Pterostylis spissa =

Cygnet greenhood

Scientific classification
- Kingdom: Plantae
- Clade: Tracheophytes
- Clade: Angiosperms
- Clade: Monocots
- Order: Asparagales
- Family: Orchidaceae
- Subfamily: Orchidoideae
- Tribe: Cranichideae
- Genus: Pterostylis
- Species: P. spissa

Binomial name
- Pterostylis spissa (D.L.Jones) G.N.Backh.

Synonyms
- Hymenochilus spissus D.L.Jones

Species of orchid

Pterostylis spissa, commonly known as cygnet greenhood, is a plant in the orchid family Orchidaceae and is endemic to Victoria. Both flowering and non-flowering plants have a rosette of leaves lying flat on the ground and flowering plants have up to twelve small, green flowers which have a green labellum with a dark green beak-like appendage.

== Description ==
Pterostylis spissa, is a terrestrial, perennial, deciduous, herb with an underground tuber. It has a rosette of between five and nine leaves 5–15 mm (0.2–0.6 in) long and 3–8 mm (0.1–0.3 in) wide, lying flat on the ground. Between two and twelve yellowish-green flowers with darker green stripes are crowded together on a flowering stem up to 120 mm (5 in) high with between four and six stem leaves with their bases wrapped around it. The flowers are 6–8 mm (0.2–0.3 in) long with the dorsal sepal and petals joined to form a hood called the "galea" over the column. The dorsal sepal is gently curved but suddenly curves downward near the tip and is about the same length as the petals. The lateral sepals turn downwards, 3–4 mm (0.1–0.2 in) long, 4–5 mm (0.2–0.2 in) wide and fused together forming a cup with tips about 2 mm (0.08 in) long and parallel to each other. The labellum is about 2 mm (0.08 in) long and wide, and pale green with a dark green, beak-like appendage. Flowering occurs in October and November.

== Taxonomy and naming ==
The cygnet greenhood was first formally described in 2009 by David Jones and given the name Hymenochilus spissus. The description was published in Australian Orchid Research from a specimen collected near Woorndoo. In 2010, Gary Backhouse changed the name to Pterostylis spissa. The specific epithet (spissa) is a Latin word meaning "close", "dense" or "thick".

== Distribution and habitat ==
Pterostylis spissa is restricted to remnant native grassland among basalt rocks in a few locations to the west of Melbourne.

== Conservation ==
Pterostylis spissa is critically endangered, only known from a few roadside reserves.
