= Buckley & Nunn =

Defunct Australian department store

Buckley & Nunn Limited
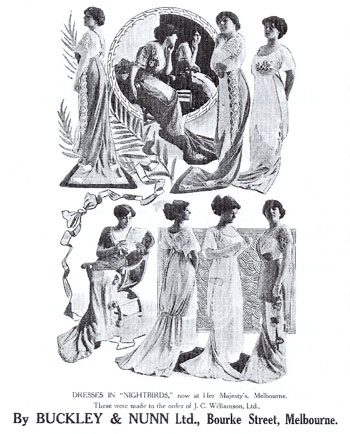
- Early advertisement by Buckley & Nunn for ladies' wear
- Company type: Public company
- Industry: Retail
- Founded: 1851; 174 years ago
- Founders: Mars Buckley; Crumpton John Nunn
- Defunct: 5 May 1982; 43 years ago
- Fate: Acquired by David Jones
- Headquarters: Melbourne, Victoria, Australia

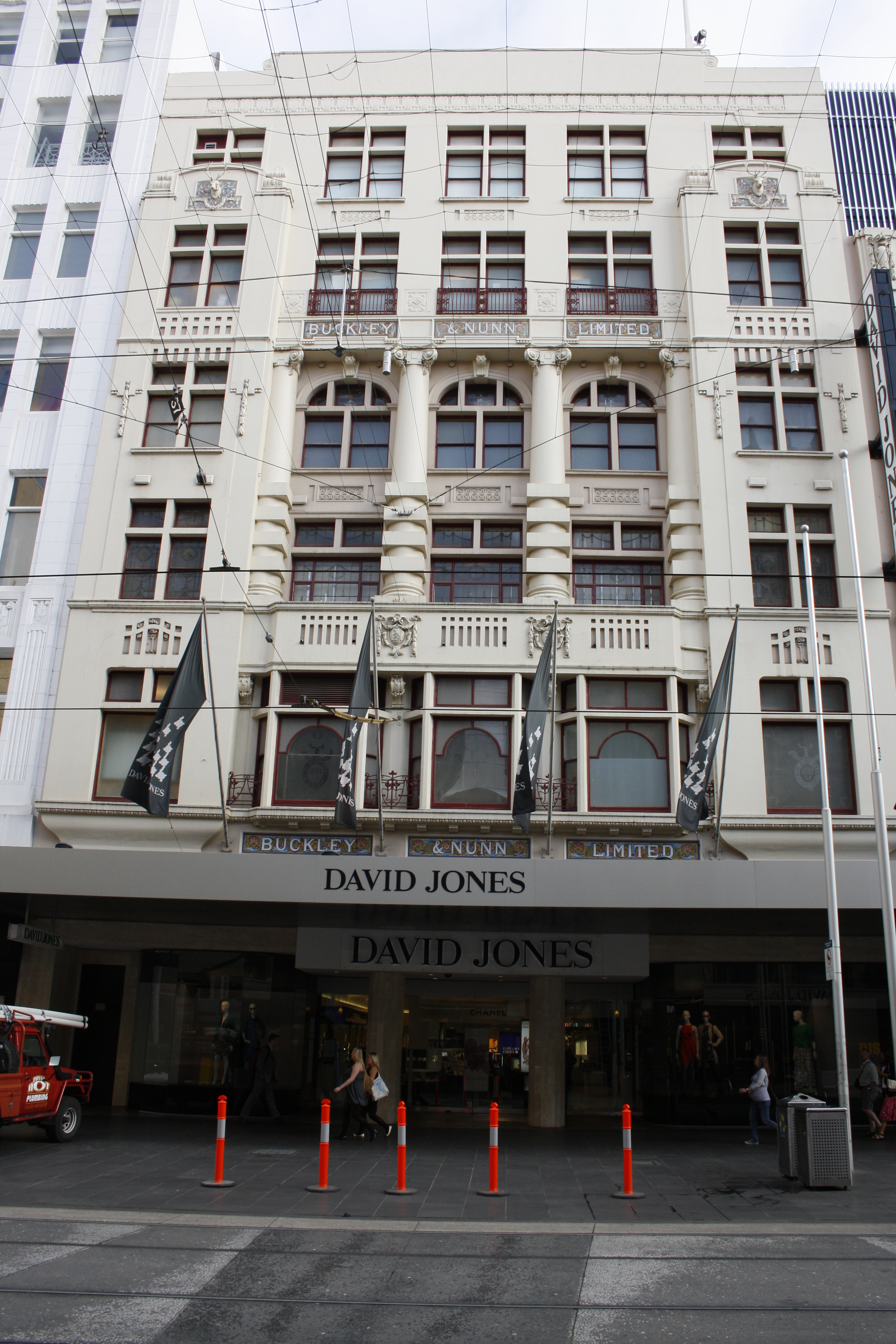
Buckley & Nunn signage on the current David Jones building (western Edwardian Baroque building)

Buckley & Nunn (also known as Buckley's) was a department store in Melbourne, Victoria, Australia. It first opened its doors in 1851 as a drapery store and, in its heyday, competed creditably as a department store with Myer (1900). It occupied a succession of buildings on Bourke Street in the Melbourne central business district until it was taken over by David Jones in 1982.

Popular as a retailer of fashionable garments, its 1914 mail-order catalogue promoted elegant frocks. In 1939, female nightwear was shown in shop windows. In fact, similar displays had caused pedestrian congestion on the footpath from as early as 1912, seen in photos of the day. In the 1920s, the store's tea room was reputedly a fashionable meeting place for ladies.

== History ==
Buckley & Nunn was co-founded by Mars Buckley (1825?– 9 October 1905) and his partner, Crumpton John Nunn (1828–29 March 1891). Buckley was born at Mallow, County Cork, Ireland and emigrated to Victoria in 1851 with his wife, Elizabeth Maroon, née Neville, and their child. Buckley came with goods to sell at the Ballarat and Forest Creek goldfields, which proved profitable. On the arrival of another consignment of goods in 1852 he began business in partnership with English-born Nunn as Buckley & Nunn. Nunn soon returned to England to manage that end of the business.

Buckley & Nunn's first store was a drapery store in a wooden building, 9 ft (2.7 m) by 30 ft (9.1 m), with a yearly rental of £250. The next few years saw great expansion and Buckley took larger premises for £3,000 a year and bought the land for £22,000, acquiring a Bourke Street frontage of 27 ft (8.2 m), soon extended to 162 ft (49 m) with a depth of 300 ft (91 m) to Post Office Place. In 1859 Buckley gave evidence to the select committee on the tariff. At that time he was employing 20 women and importing most of his goods through Dalgety. In the 1860s he established direct communications with the main British firms, and the store made annual profits of about £40,000. In 1866 Buckley helped to found the Commercial Bank of Australia.

After the death of Nunn by suicide in 1891, Buckley sold the business to Robert Reid, who sold it on in London in 1892 for £300,000. The business was now called Buckley & Nunn Pty Ltd.

Buckley hated publicity and took no part in political or municipal life. Buckley died at his home, Beaulieu (now St Catherine's School), 17 Heyington Place, Toorak, of heart failure at the age of 80, on 9 October 1905. He was survived by his wife and five of their seven children. Of his four surviving sons, Gerald Neville was educated at Melbourne Grammar School and bought Narrapumelap station from the executors of John Dickson Wyselaskie (1883); Percy Neville became a lieutenant-colonel and Godfrey and Charles Mars returned to England.

The business was made into a public company Buckley & Nunn Ltd, which modernized the business and built the two iconic buildings on the north side of Bourke Street, the western building in 1911–12 and the eastern building in 1933–34.

In 1960, Buckley & Nunn Ltd opened a site at the Chadstone Shopping Centre. This was followed with the opening of a store at Northland Shopping Centre in 1966.

The business and properties were bought by David Jones in 1982, and merged into the David Jones group. The company was delisted from the Australian Securities Exchange on 5 May 1982.

Following the purchase by David Jones, the stores at Chadstone Shopping Centre and Northland Shopping Centre were closed during the 1980s.

== Buildings ==
In the 20th century, the firm occupied two adjacent buildings on the north side of Bourke Street. The westerly one (306-12 Bourke Street) was the Edwardian Baroque-style Buckley & Nunn Emporium, built in two stages in 1911 and 1912.

The eastern building, the Men's Store (298-304 Bourke Street), was designed by the same local architects Bates, Smart & McCutcheon. The Moderne or art-deco-style building was constructed in 1933–1934. It was considered an architectural triumph and won the Royal Victorian Institute of Architects' Street Architecture Medal in 1934, being "a distinct departure from the traditional and thus exemplary of the modern trend in design". It was decorated with male bas-relief figures in jazz-age costume, glazed terracotta panels and spandrels faced with stainless-steel chevrons and colourful musical-note symbols. The National Trust has described the lift cars and lobbies as "unequalled in Victoria as examples of the European 'Art Deco' geometric forms which dominated decorative art in the 1930s".

== 'Buckley's chance' idiom ==
The origin of the Australian slang term "Buckley's chance" (meaning "little or no possibility" or "no chance at all") has been explained as rhyming slang, viz, "Buckley and Nunn" (meaning "None"); and as a punning reference ("You've two chances: Buckley's and none"). Australians in states other than Victoria generally believe the idiom derives from the adventures of escaped colonial convict William Buckley.
