= Merrang =

Historic homestead in Victoria, Australia

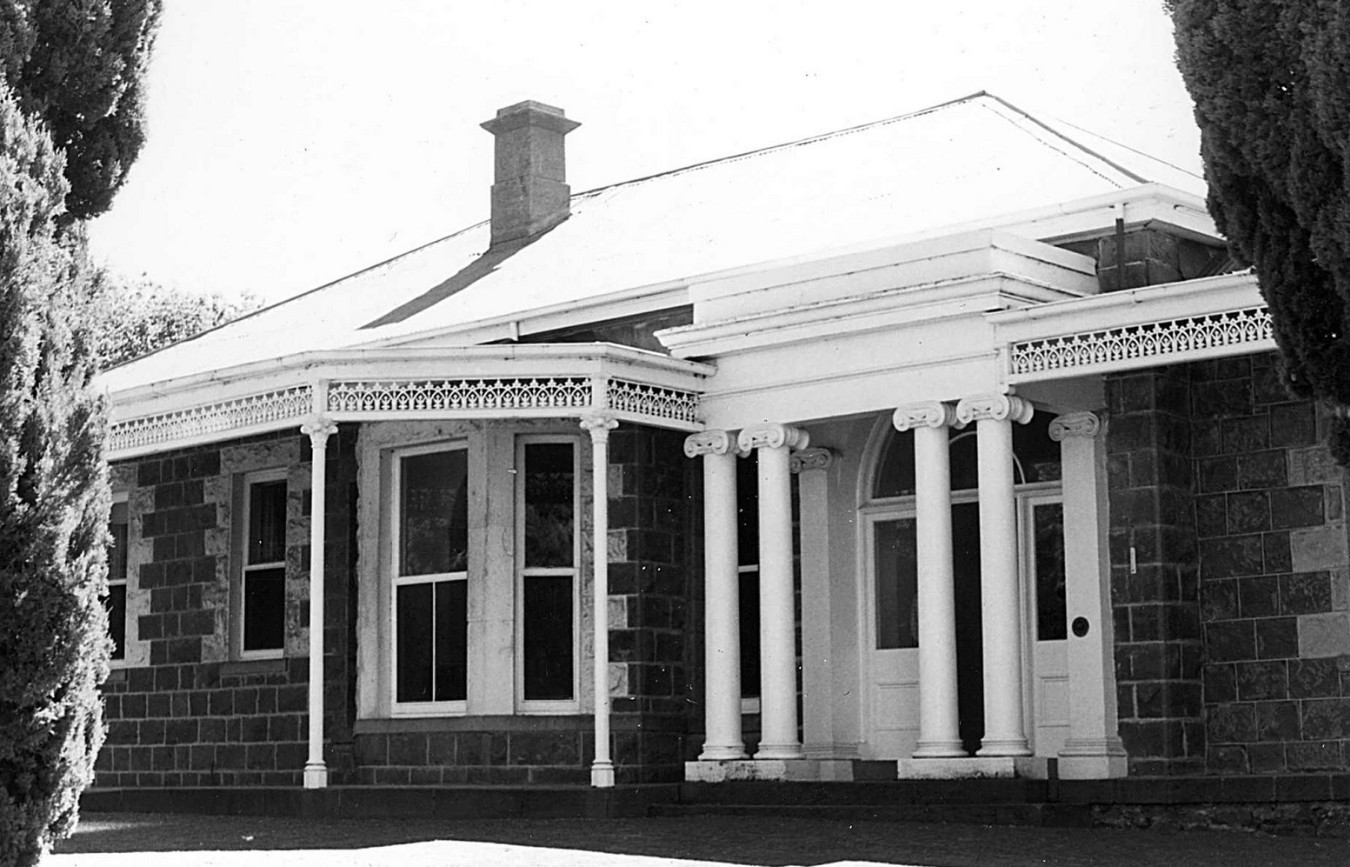
- Merrang Homestead

- Location in Moyne Shire, Victoria
- 38°03′12″S 142°38′03″E
- Type: Homestead, associated built facilities and grounds
- Location: Hexham, Victoria, Australia
- Nearest city: Warrnambool

History
- Built: 1859, 1865 (extensions)
- Built for: Robert Hood

Site notes
- Architect: Andrew Kerr
- Architectural style: Italianate

Victorian Heritage Register
- Official name: Merrang Homestead
- Type: State heritage (built and natural)
- Designated: 9 October 1974
- Reference no.: H0322

Merrang is a historic pastoral property located west of Mortlake, outside the hamlet of Hexham, Victoria, Australia. Established as one of the earliest pastoral runs in the Port Phillip District during the late 1830s, the property developed into one of the Western District's best-known grazing estates. Merrang was owned by the Hood family for 157 years across four generations, from 1856 until 2013, during which time it became renowned for its Lincoln and later Polwarth sheep studs. The estate retains a substantial nineteenth-century homestead complex and is listed on the Victorian Heritage Register. Since 2013, Merrang has been the centrepiece of the Te Mania Angus stud.

== History ==
The pastoral occupation of the district followed the favourable reports of Major Thomas Mitchell and the expansion of Tasmanian pastoralists into the Port Phillip District during the late 1830s. In 1839 the Watson brothers became the first European settlers to reach the Hopkins River and established the pastoral run they named Merrang on its western bank. In 1841, Claude Farie, in partnership with George Rodgers, assumed control of the station, and Farie is believed to have built a timber cottage on the property, which was recorded during a visit by Mrs Perry, wife of the first Anglican Bishop of Melbourne Charles Perry. Farie later sold Merrang to Adolphus Sceales.

In 1856 Scottish pastoralist Robert Hood purchased Merrang from the trustees of Adolphus Sceales' estate after marrying Sceales' widow, Jane. Hood, who arrived in the colony from Berwickshire in 1854 with his daughter and two sons, already owned the nearby Bolac Plains run. He paid £11,000 for Merrang, including 9,000 sheep, 24 horses, 19 bullocks, 7 milk cows, one heifer calf and other young cattle. During the following decade the property expanded to around 20,000 acres (8,095 ha), and by 1865 it carried more than 18,000 sheep.

In 1859 Hood constructed a four-room bluestone cottage that formed the nucleus of the present homestead. Beginning in 1865, the residence was substantially enlarged with a single-storey Italianate extension incoporating an imposing an imposing Ionic entrance portico, hall, drawing room and additional bedrooms. In 1875 the original timber verandah was replaced with a cast-iron verandah that visually unified the earlier and later sections of the house. That same year Warrnambool architect Andrew Kerr designed the gatekeeper's lodge and the station outbuildings, including stables, while a later fire in 1917 reduced the large bluestone stables to a fraction of their original size. The original four-room cottage and central passage remain identifiable within the present homestead.

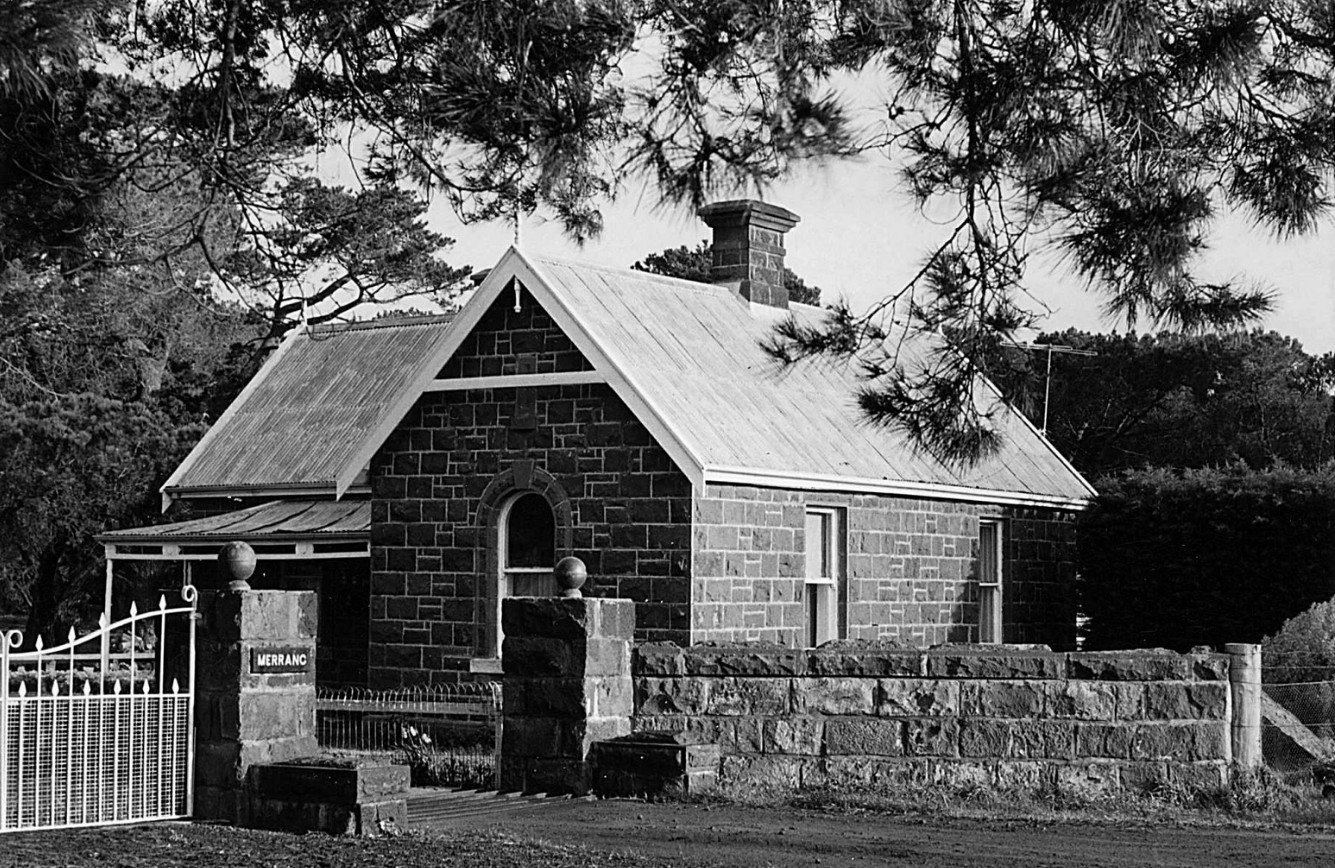
The gatekeeper's lodge of Merrang

Robert Hood established one of Victoria's leading Lincoln sheep studs in 1872, purchasing foundation stock from Thomas Austin of Barwon Park. He became a prominent figure in the pastoral industry, serving as an originator and president of both the Long Woolled Association of Victoria and the Australian Sheepbreeders' Association, while also serving on the Warrnambool and Mortlake shire councils. Beyond pastoral pursuits, Hood attempted to introduce trout into the Hopkins River, chaired the Warrnambool Woollen Mill until it was destroyed by fire in 1882, and served as shire president in 1876. He was also noted for his employment of many local Aboriginal people on the property. Hood died in 1891 at the age of 70 and was buried in the family cemetery at Merrang. The cemetery also contains the graves of two bullock drivers who reportedly died after accidentally drinking poisoned tea near the old stockyards.

Following Robert Hood's death, Merrang remained in the ownership of successive generations of the Hood family. His son Robert Alexander David "Alec" Hood (1864–1934) had grown up on the property and, as a child, played with local Aboriginal children, who nicknamed him "Correlup" after a nearby lagoon. Educated at Geelong Grammar School from 1875, he returned to Merrang after working as a jackaroo and purchased the property from his family in 1889. Alec Hood continued developing the Lincoln sheep stud and became a prominent polo player, competing for around four decades. An enthusiastic sportsman and shooter, he also maintained a large household at Merrang, employing domestic staff including a cook, maids, chauffeur, gardener, nurse and later a governess.

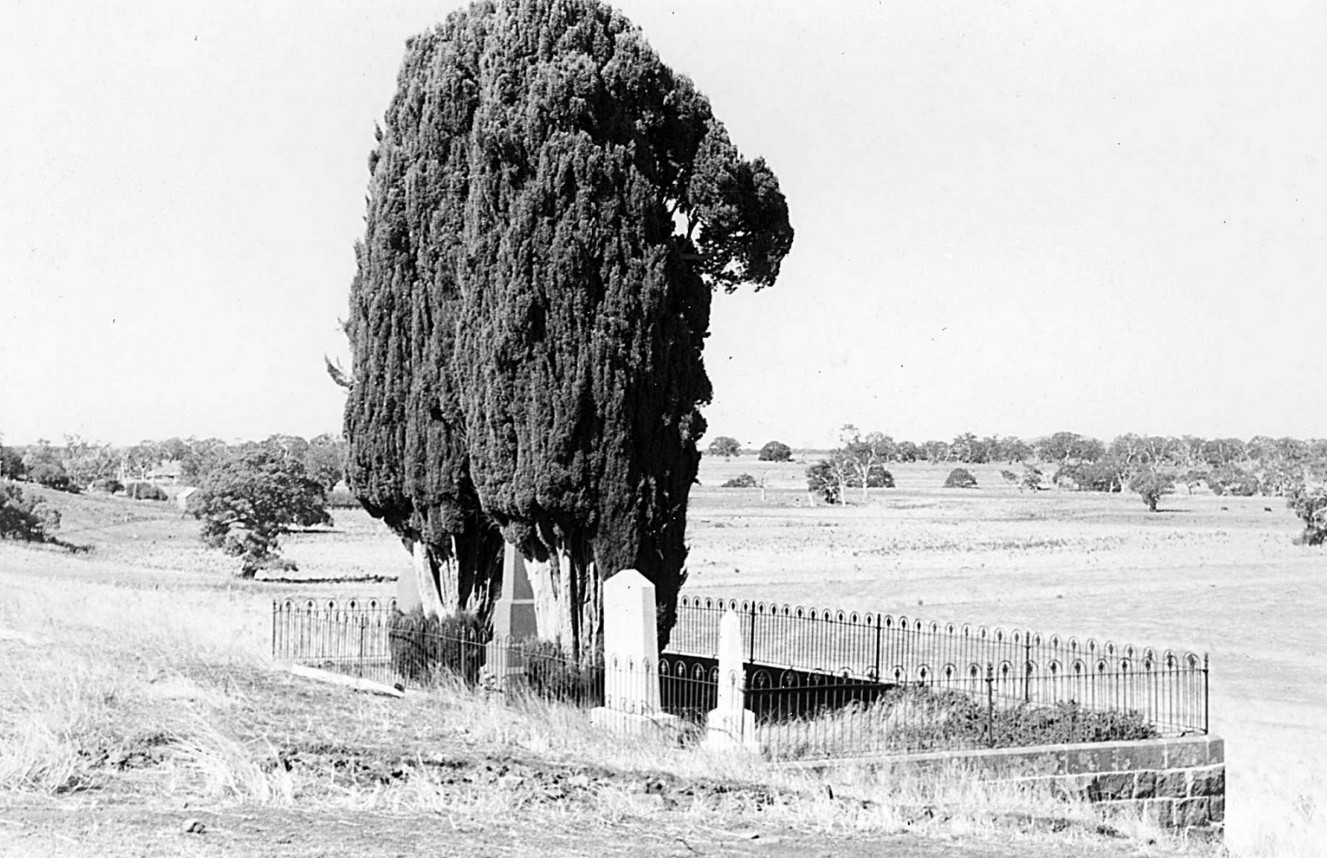
The cemetery on the property

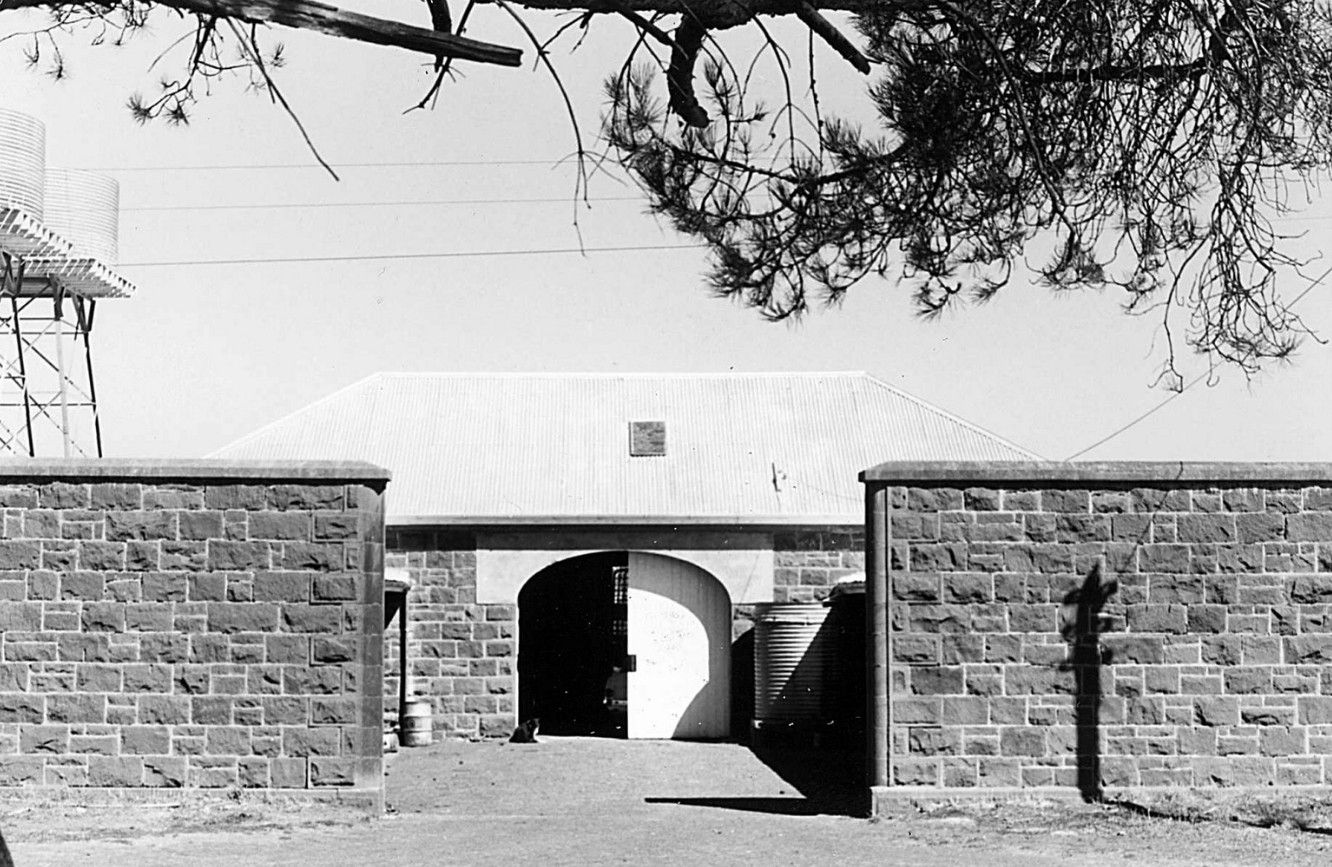
Rear of the coach house

Alec Hood died in 1934, leaving Merrang to his wife Georgie, his young son Robert Alexander Dunlop Hood and three daughters. During the twentieth century,the property developed a Polwarth sheep stud, established in 1924 from the Merrang Lincoln flock, and became well known for both breeds. However, the estate was significantly reduced in size after much of the land was acquired by the Soldier Settlement Commission in 1948 to meet probate obligations, leaving approximately 4,600 acres (1,862 ha). Despite this reduction, Merrang remained one of the Western District's prominent pastoral properties. Members of the Hood family continued the tradition of public service, with four generations serving as councillors on the Mortlake Shire.

Robert Alexander Dunlop Hood (MBE) managed Merrang from 1946 until 1986. During this period the property ran Hereford cattle alongside its sheep enterprise, while the strong wool market resulted in relatively few changes to its operations. Hood served for more than three decades on the Mortlake Shire Council, was active in both the Australian Sheepbreeders' Association and the Polwarth Association, and was appointed a Member of the Order of the British Empire (MBE) in 1982.

David Robert Hood assumed management of Merrang in 1986, when the property still carried approximately 18,000 sheep and 300 Hereford cattle. Following the collapse of wool prices in 1991, the family discontinued the Hereford breeding programme and closed the Polwarth stud in favour of Merino sheep. David Hood also witnessed significant changes in labour requirements, as several families and five station workers had lived on the property during the 1970s, by the time Merrang was sold it was operated with only one employee in addition to the owner.

After 157 years of Hood family ownership, Merrang was purchased in 2013 by Tom and Lucy Gubbins, who established the property as the headquarters of the Te Mania Angus stud in partnership with Amanda and Hamish McFarlane. By 2017 the enterprise comprised around 1,600 stud cows across approximately 2,700 hectares (6,672 acres) of improved pasture, supplemented by leased land at nearby Connewarran. The Australian Te Mania Angus operation traces its origins to the Te Mania cattle station in New Zealand's South Island, where the Wilding family had developed the stud before Andrew and Mary Gubbins (nee Wilding) imported foundation cattle to Australia in 1971.

== See also ==
- Brie Brie
- Coomete
- Salt Creek
