= Berrambool =

Historic homestead in Victoria, Australia

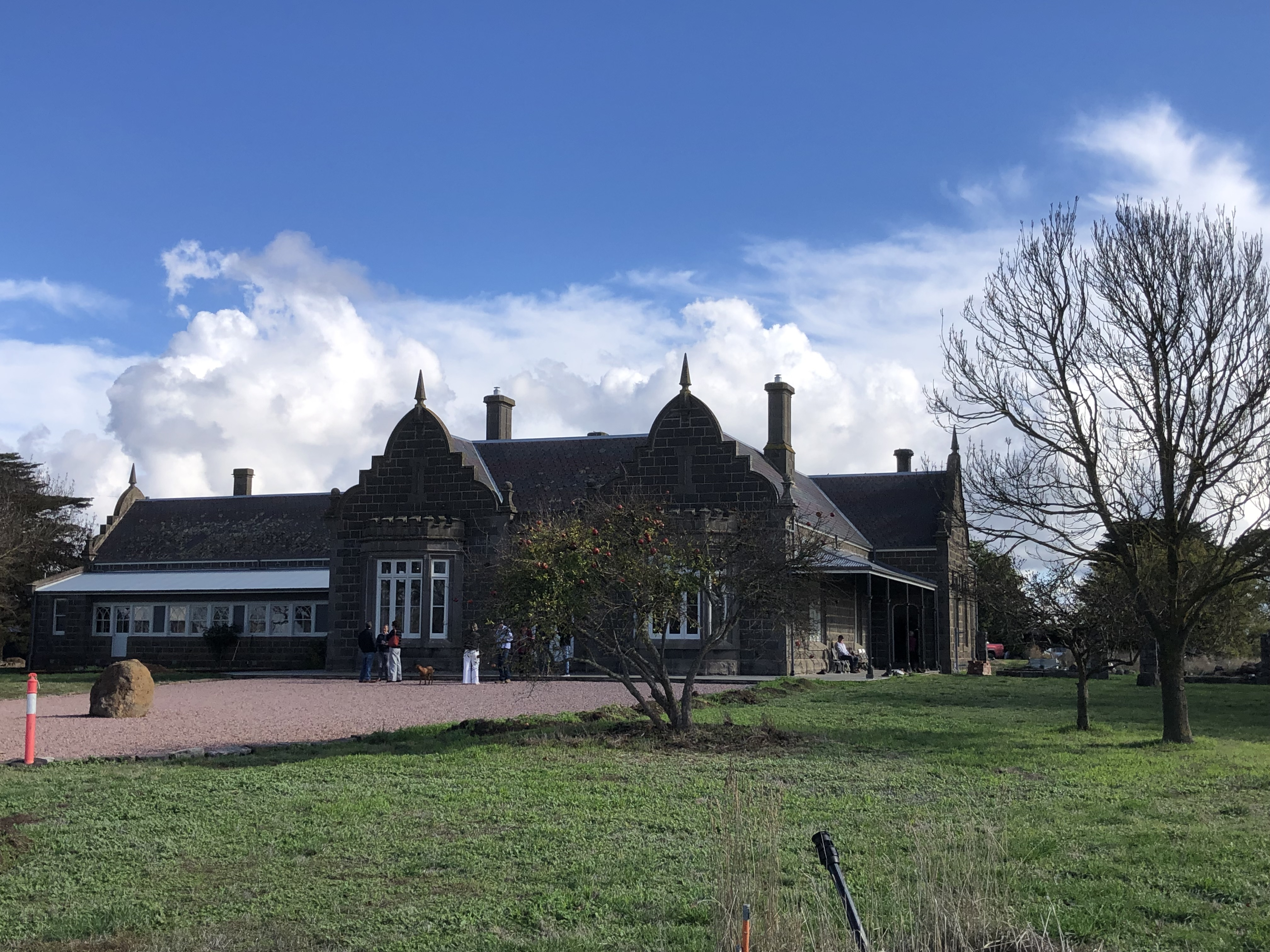
- Berrambool Homestead, 17 May 2026

- Location in the Rural City of Ararat, Victoria
- 37°46′02″S 142°41′03″E
- Type: Homestead, associated built facilities and grounds
- Location: Wickliffe, Victoria, Australia
- Nearest city: Ararat

History
- Built: 1868
- Built for: John Moffatt

Site notes
- Architect: James Henry Fox
- Architectural style: Victorian Gothic

Victorian Heritage Register
- Official name: Berrambool Homestead
- Type: State heritage (built and natural)
- Designated: 9 June 1960
- Reference no.: 69335

Berrambool is a historic homestead and pastoral property located outside the town of Wickliffe, Victoria, Australia. The current property is composed of a substantial house and stables, with the woolshed, shearers' quarters and overseer's house presently located on an adjacent allotment. Berrambool is recognised for its associations with the early pastoral expansion of the Western District and the development of the wool industry in Victoria. The property is also listed on the Victorian Heritage Register.

== History ==
Berrambool originated as part of the larger Hopkins Hill pastoral run, one of the principal squatting runs established in the Wickliffe district during the early years of European settlement in western Victoria. In 1840, the 98,000-acre Hopkins Hill Run, situated on the Hopkins River, was taken up by the pastoral firm. J. and A. Dennistoun and Co. The run was initially managed by Henry Gibb before later coming under the management of Alexander Russell.

In 1857, Scottish pastoralist John Moffatt took over the Hopkins Hill run. Two years later, in 1859, Moffatt, who resided at the under-construction Chatsworth House, subdivided the run into four properties: Boortkoi (sold to Peter Manifold of Purrumbete), Berrambool, Salt Creek (leased to Peter McIntyre) and Flat Top Hill (leased to Peter Armstrong). Berrambool was leased to a pastoral partnership consisting of Josiah Austin, Thomas Maidment and Thomas Millear. Moffatt also leased the neighbouring Lake Boloke run, expanding his pastoral interests within the district.

By 1860, the Berrambool group leased Greenvale, a 5,200-acre property near Willaura, from James Austin before later purchasing it. They also owned Audley Estate near Hamilton and Beulah Estate at Glenthompson, in addition to leasing a property near Winchelsea from Thomas Austin of Barwon Park. The partnership operated for 17 years before being dissolved in 1877.

In 1868, the homestead, stables, woolshed and associated buildings were constructed. The principal bluestone buildings have been attributed to architect James Henry Fox, who also designed Chatsworth House and has been associated with the design of Werribee Park Mansion. The homestead and stables are notable examples of Victorian Gothic architecture, with the homestead also incorporating Elizabethan Revival features such as shaped gable parapets and castellated bay windows. The buildings display a high level of craftsmanship, particularly in their bluestone masonry, carried out by Scottish stonemasons.

In September 1871, John Moffatt fell ill on the return journey from England and died whilst stopping over in Galle, British Ceylon (present-day Sri Lanka). Ownership passed on to his nephew William Moffatt.

An additional wing to the house was added in 1890, linked with a roof of glass panes that originally acted as a conservatory. The woolshed was also extended in the same year to make room for 1300 sheep and 16 Woleseley machines. 24,000 sheep were shorn annually, increasing to 34,000 in 1899.

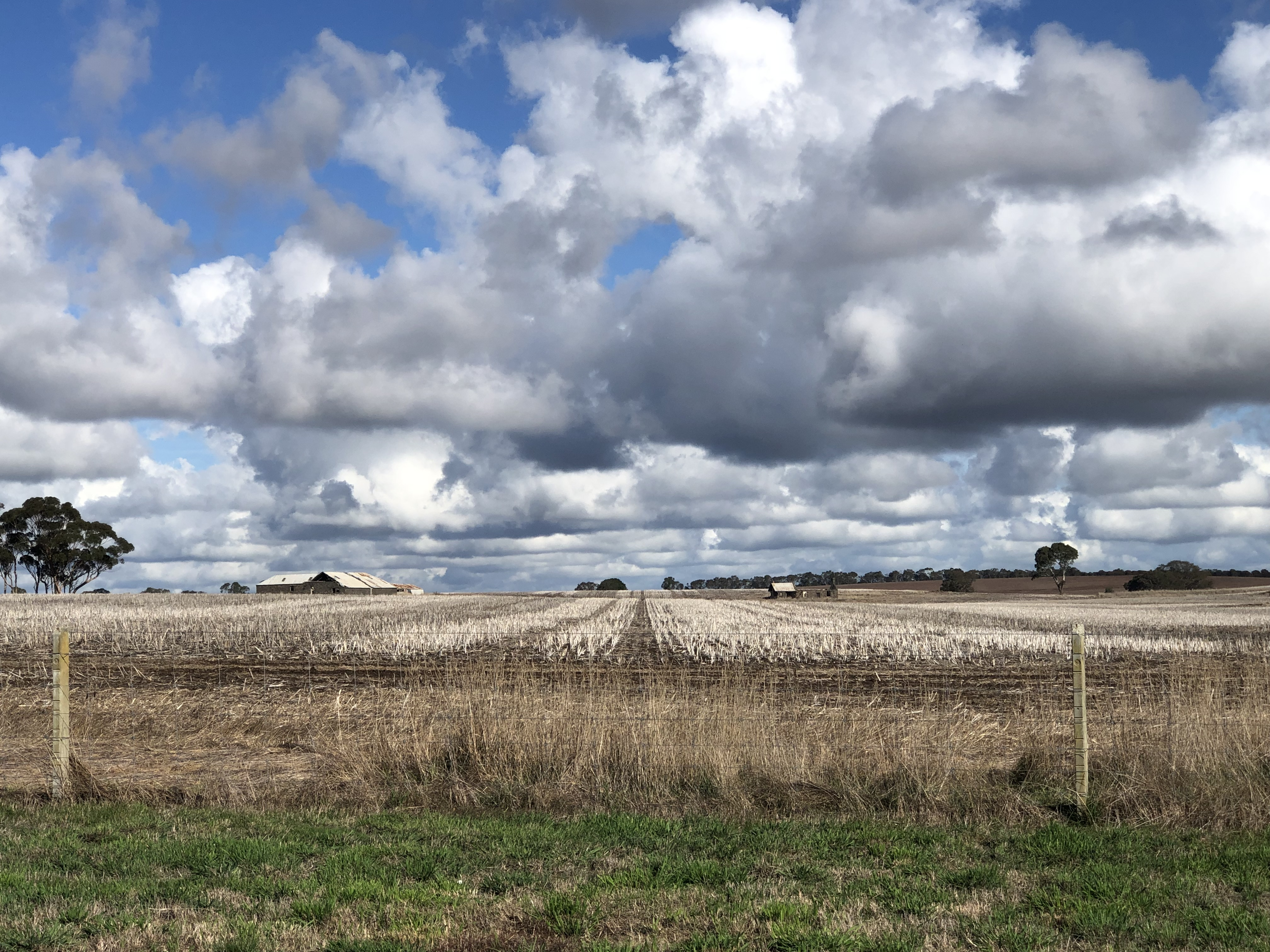
The woolshed and overseer's cottage, seen from the property grounds

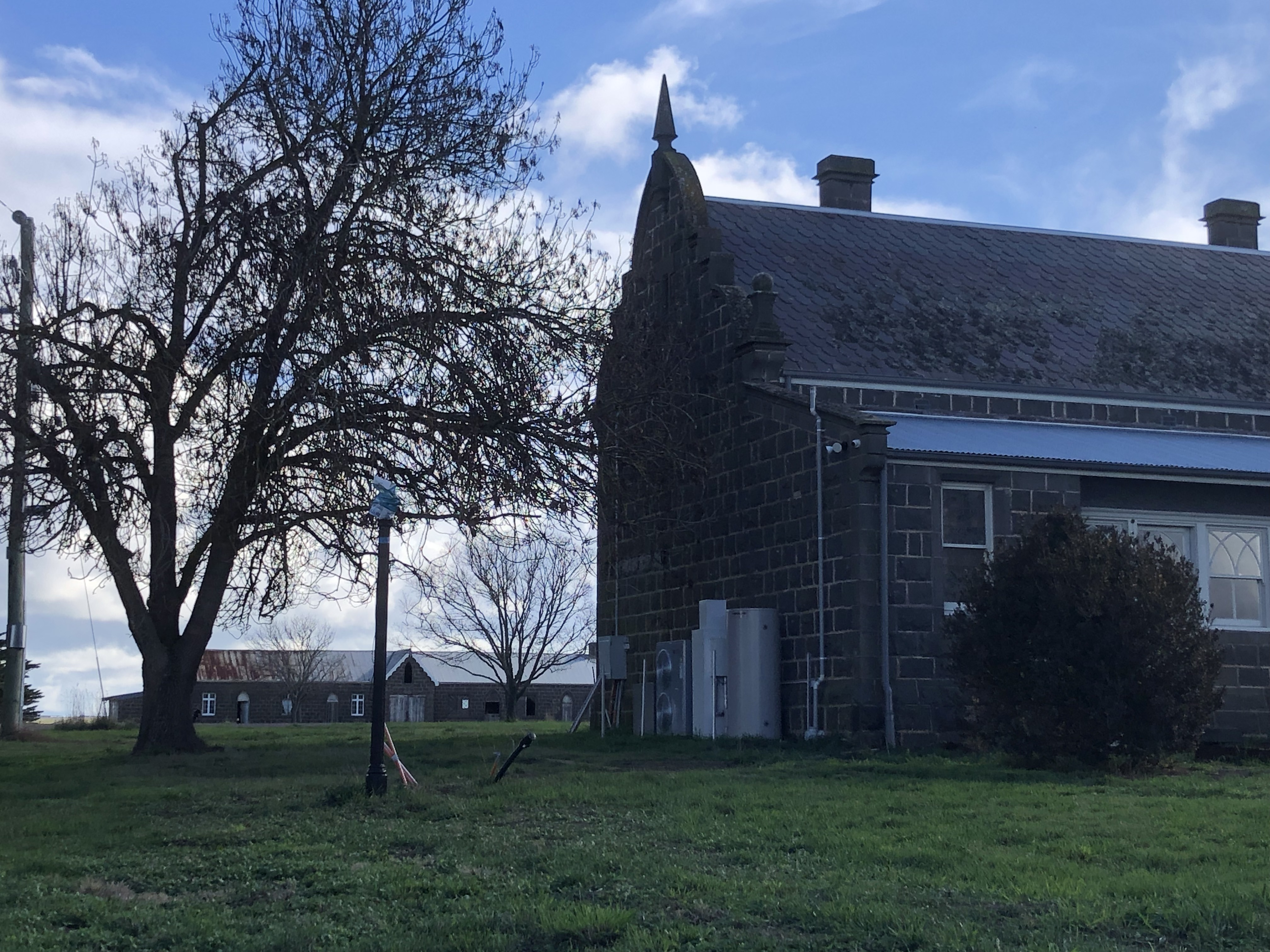
Part of the wing, with the stables seen in the background

In 1893, William Moffat moved in to the Berrambool homestead. Prior to his move, he had been managing Burnewong Station from 1881–1884, and from 1884–1885 had been living on the Lake Bolac Estate that he was renting, as well as renting Watgania near the Grampians. He expanded his holdings by purchasing Brooksdale and Mirranatwa in the Victoria Valley in 1900.

Berrambool was visited by Kathleen and Violet Dickens, grand-daughters of the author Charles Dickens in the early 1900s. They had been living with William Moffatt's wife's sister, Miss McLellan, in Canterbury, and would frequent Berrambool as a holiday spot, before returning to England before World War I. Violet Dickens gave Charles Dicken's desk to William Moffatt's first grand-daughter, but this was destroyed by a bushfire at Corra in 1944.

In 1903, the estate of John Moffatt was formally sold off, with the land being sold into eight lots, totalling 91,719 acres. This included Towanway (3,434 acres), Berrambool (20,240 acres), Chatsworth House (13,817 acres), Hopkins Hill (17,390 acres), Cattle Runs (10,814 acres), Salt Creek (17,173 acres), Flat Top Hill (Mondilibi) (8,701 acres) and the Toorak block (150 acres). William Moffat purchased back the Berrambool and Cattle Runs portions at this time, as well as leasing Strathkellar.

In 1906, Henry de Little of Caramut House purchased Cattle Runs, and used it as a source of timber, and Towanway was purchased by Gerald Buckley of nearby Narrapumelap.

William Moffatt died in 1937, and ownership remained in the family until after World War II.

Following World War II, the estate became associated with Victoria's Soldier Settlement Scheme, with the estate being subdivided into ten allotments in 1947. The property was bought by Kevin Nolan during this time, and was then subsequently bought by Edith Holyman (née Bushman) and her son Frederick Holyman in the 1960s. Much of the Holymans' furnishings were brought over from England to Tasmania on the Star of Russia by Colonel John St. George Bushman, who was a surgeon in the British 21st Hussars, and Edith's grandfather, and then from Tasmania to Berrambool.

The homestead has since been meticulously restored by the current owners, Neil Gibbs and Jane Marchment.

=== Furnishings ===
Furnishings from the Holyman era included two bronze Chinese dogs, estimated to be 500–800 years old, which flanked the front door. These were originally at the front of the Melbourne Club. The garden contained a copper street lamp from London. The house also originally contained a Georgian Waterford glass chandelier.

== Gallery ==
Berrambool Homestead
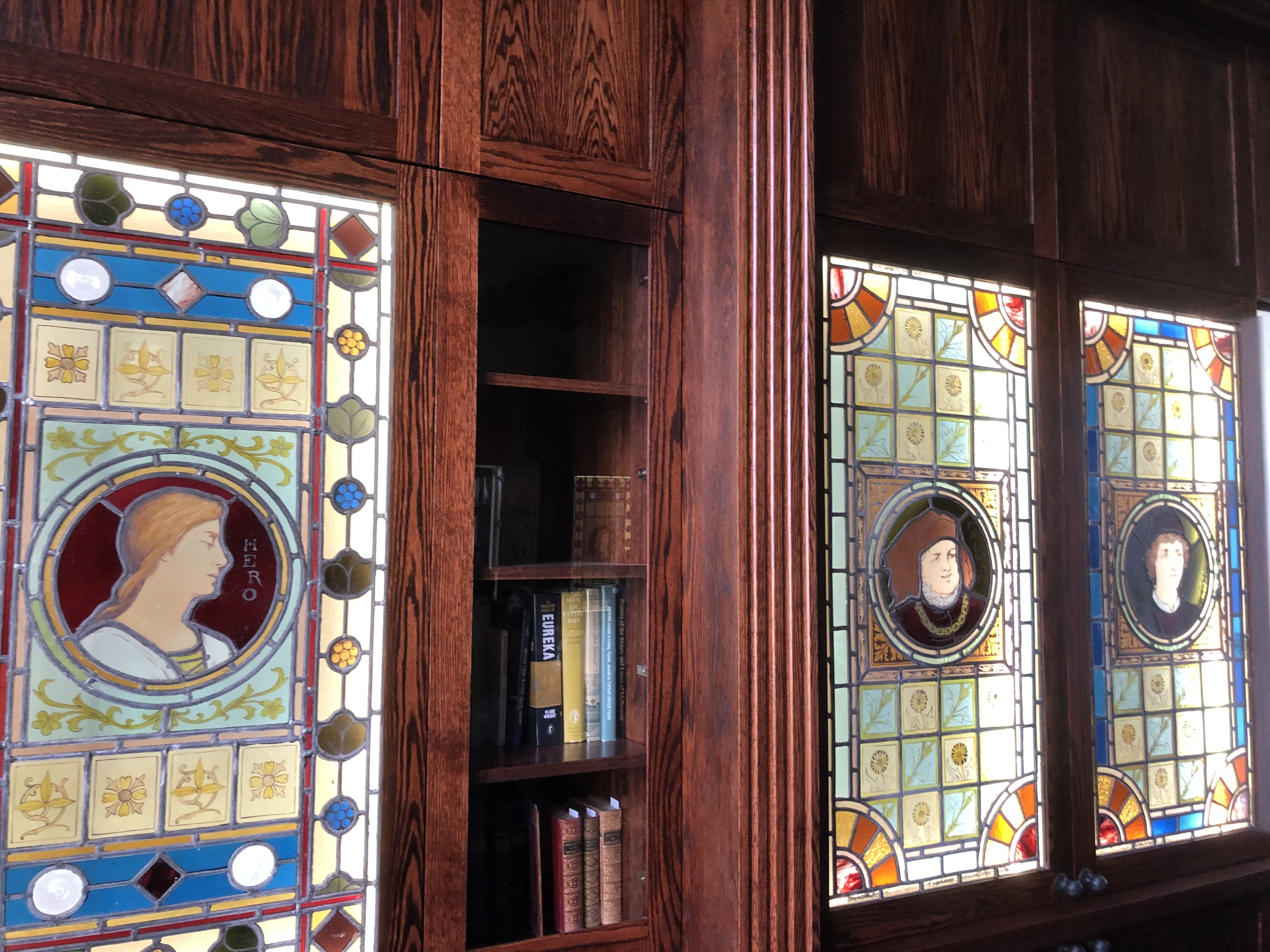
Leadlights in the library, representing characters from Shakespeare's novels

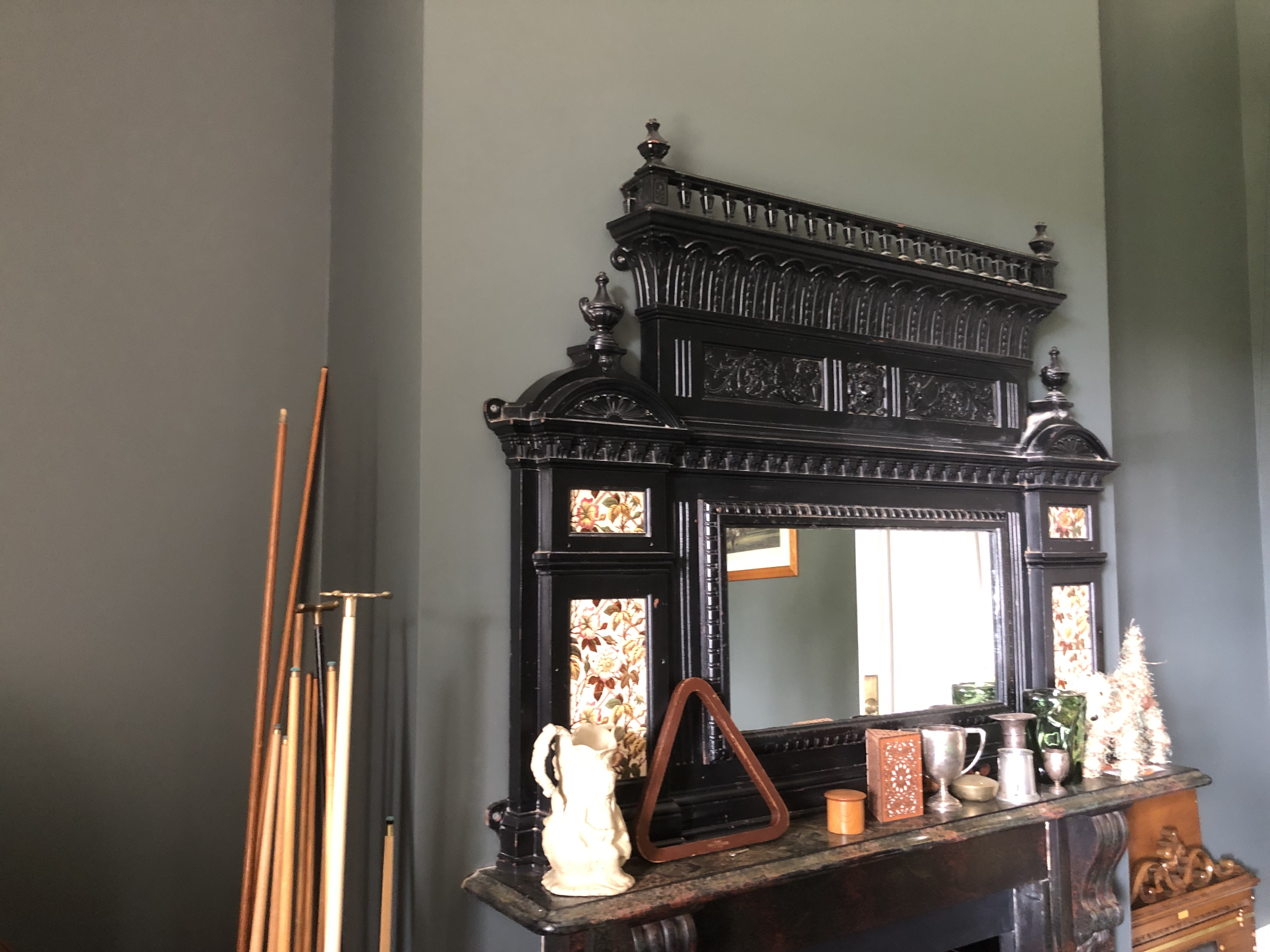
The games room

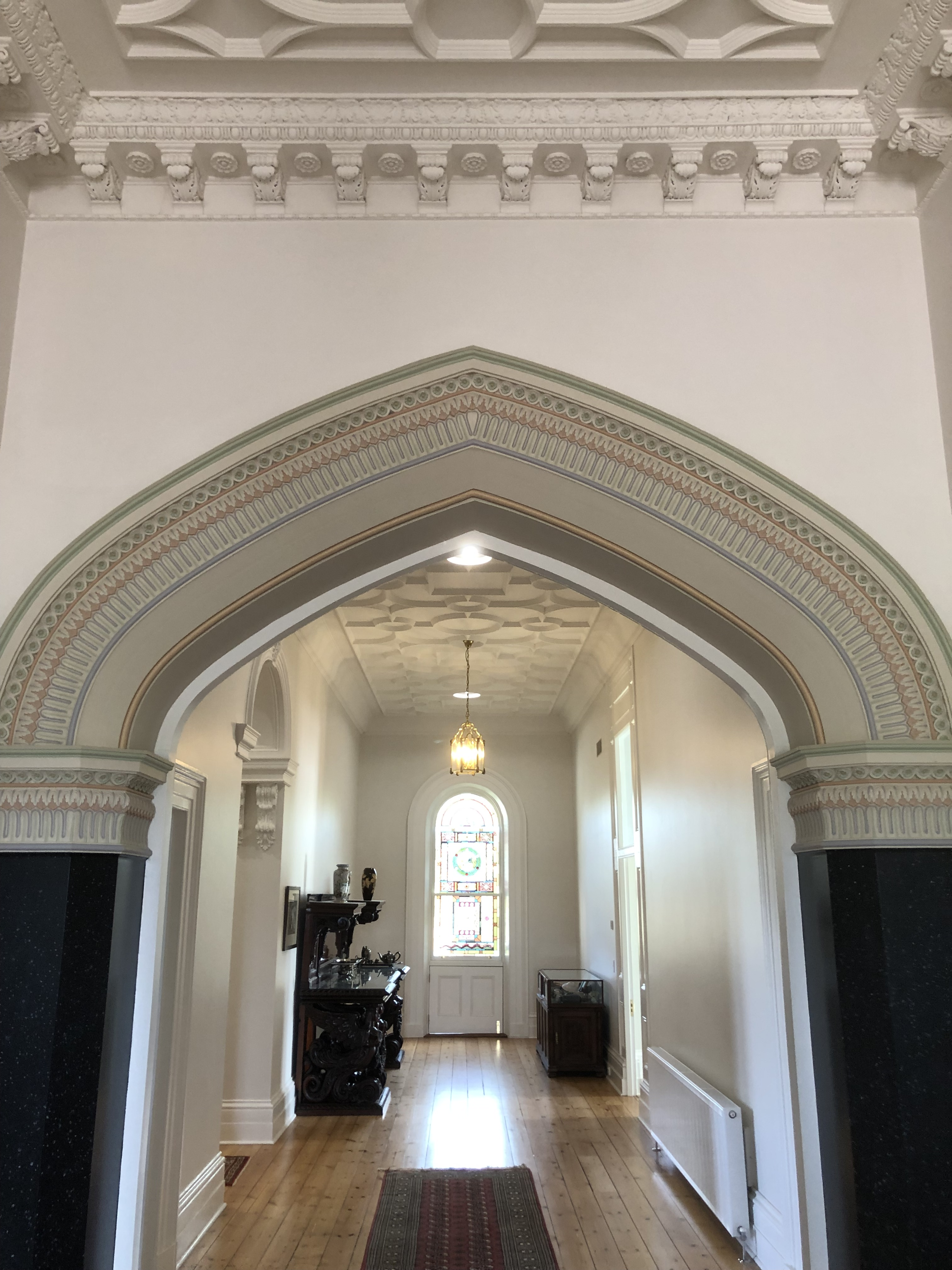
The Byzantine arch

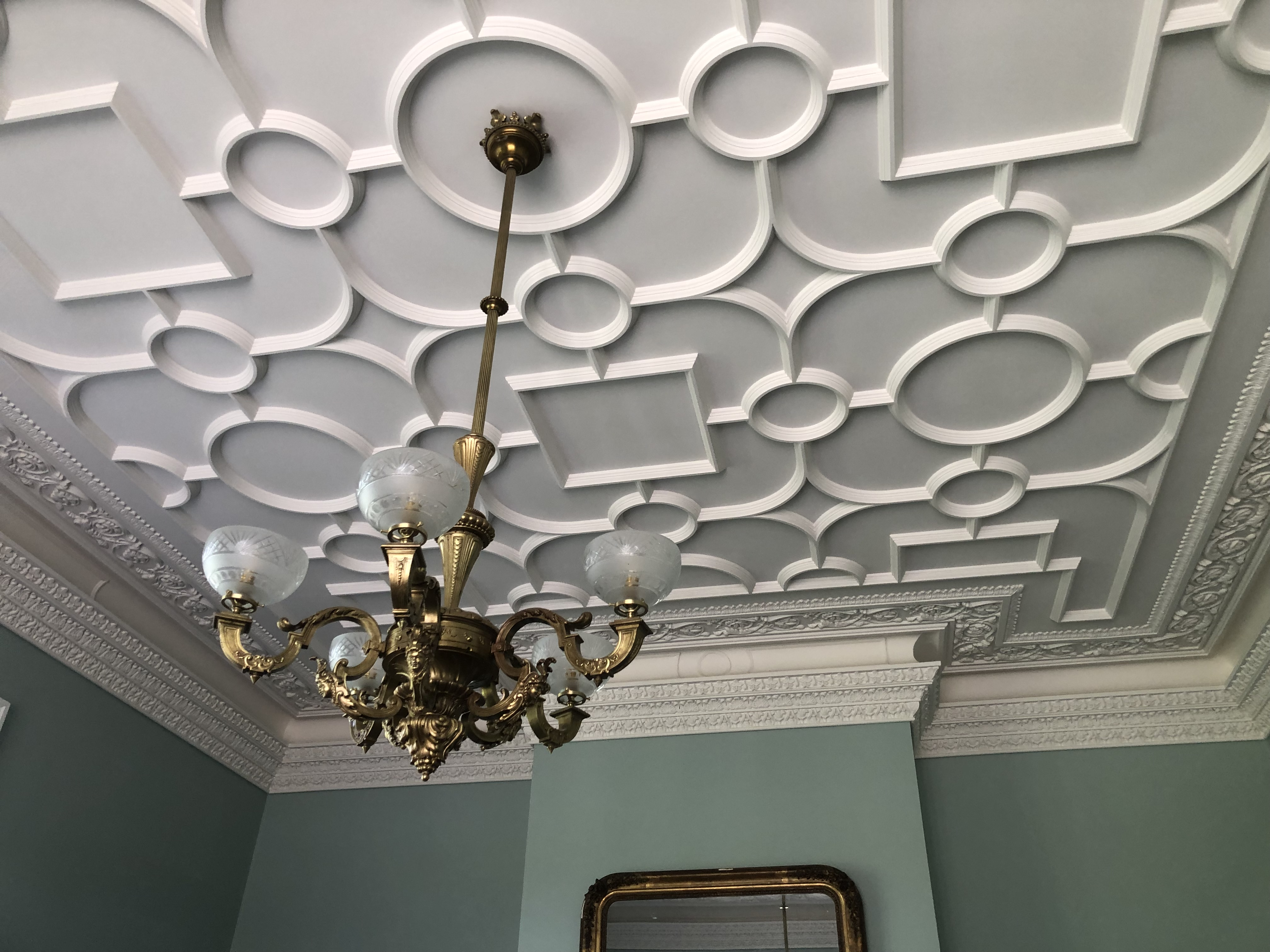
The ladies' room

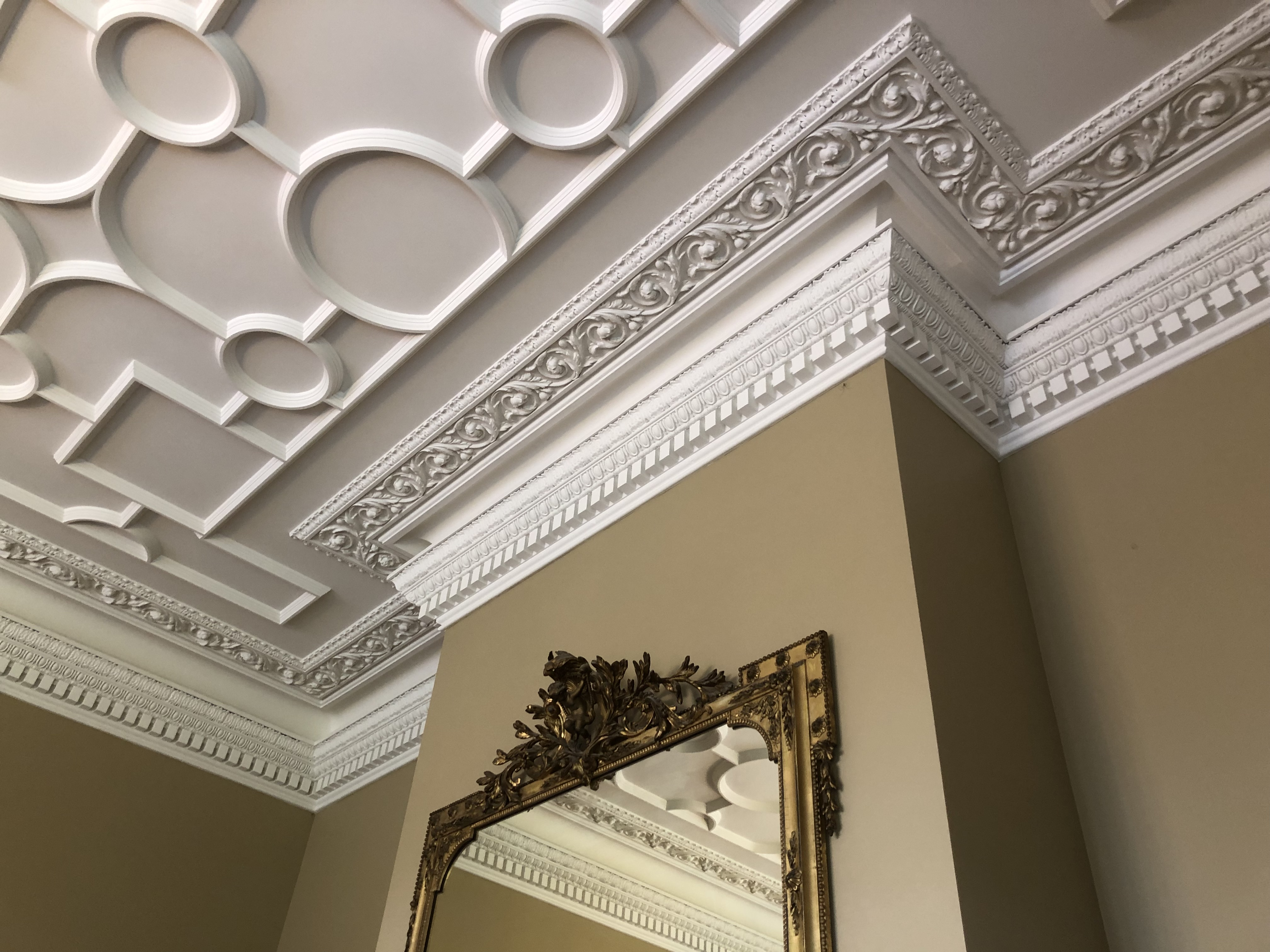
The mens' room

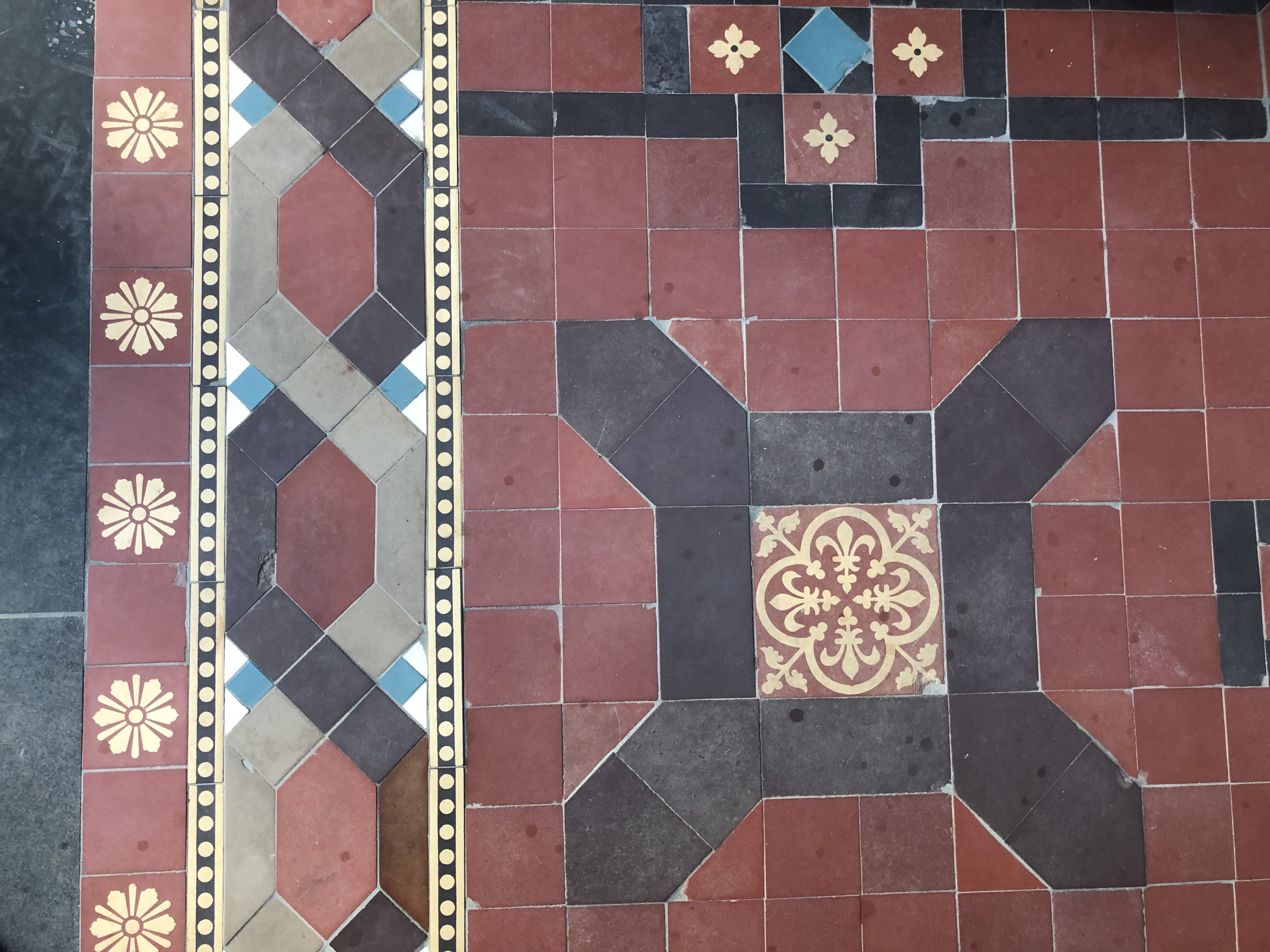
Encaustic tile detailing

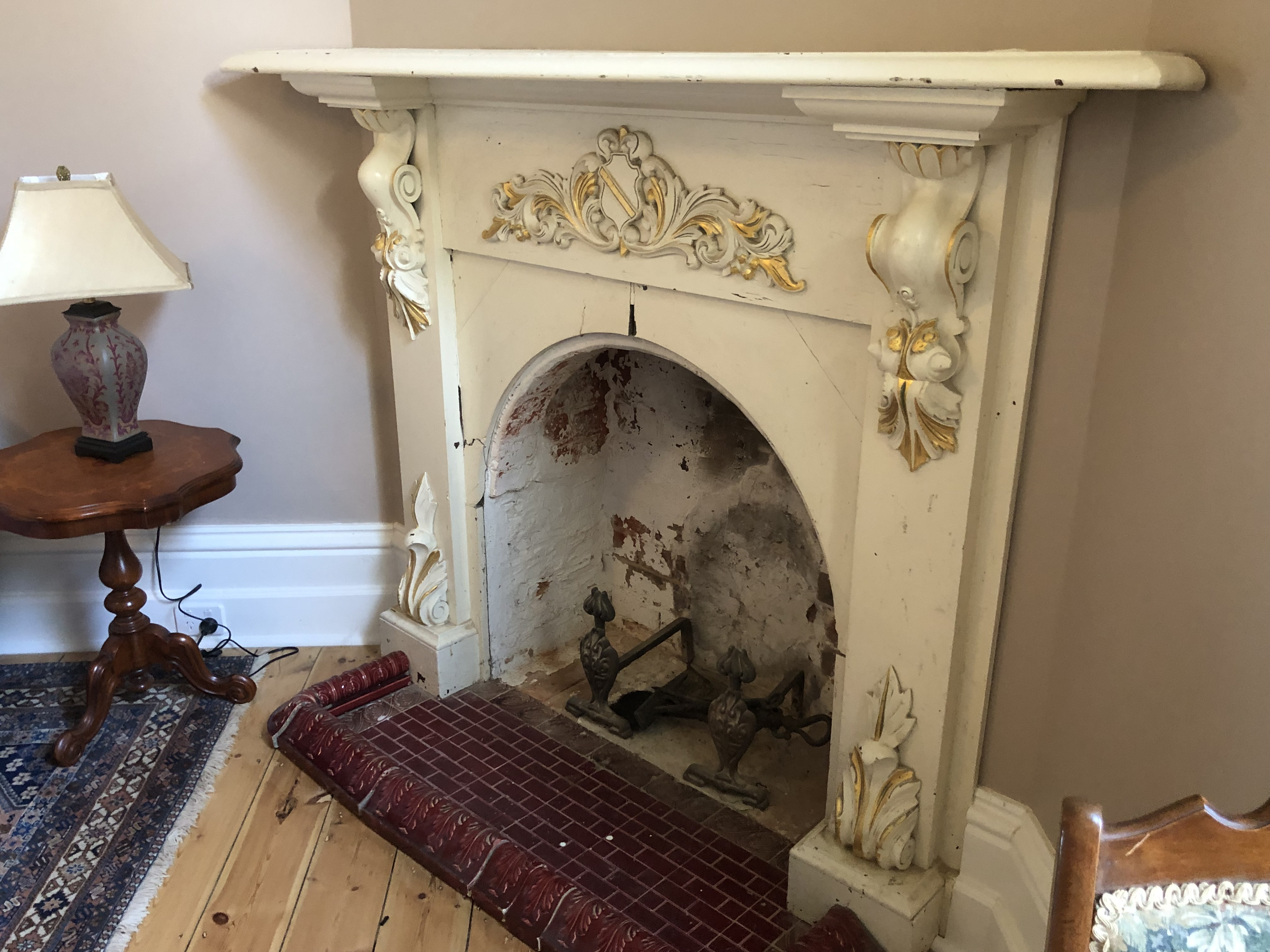
A fireplace in one of the bedrooms

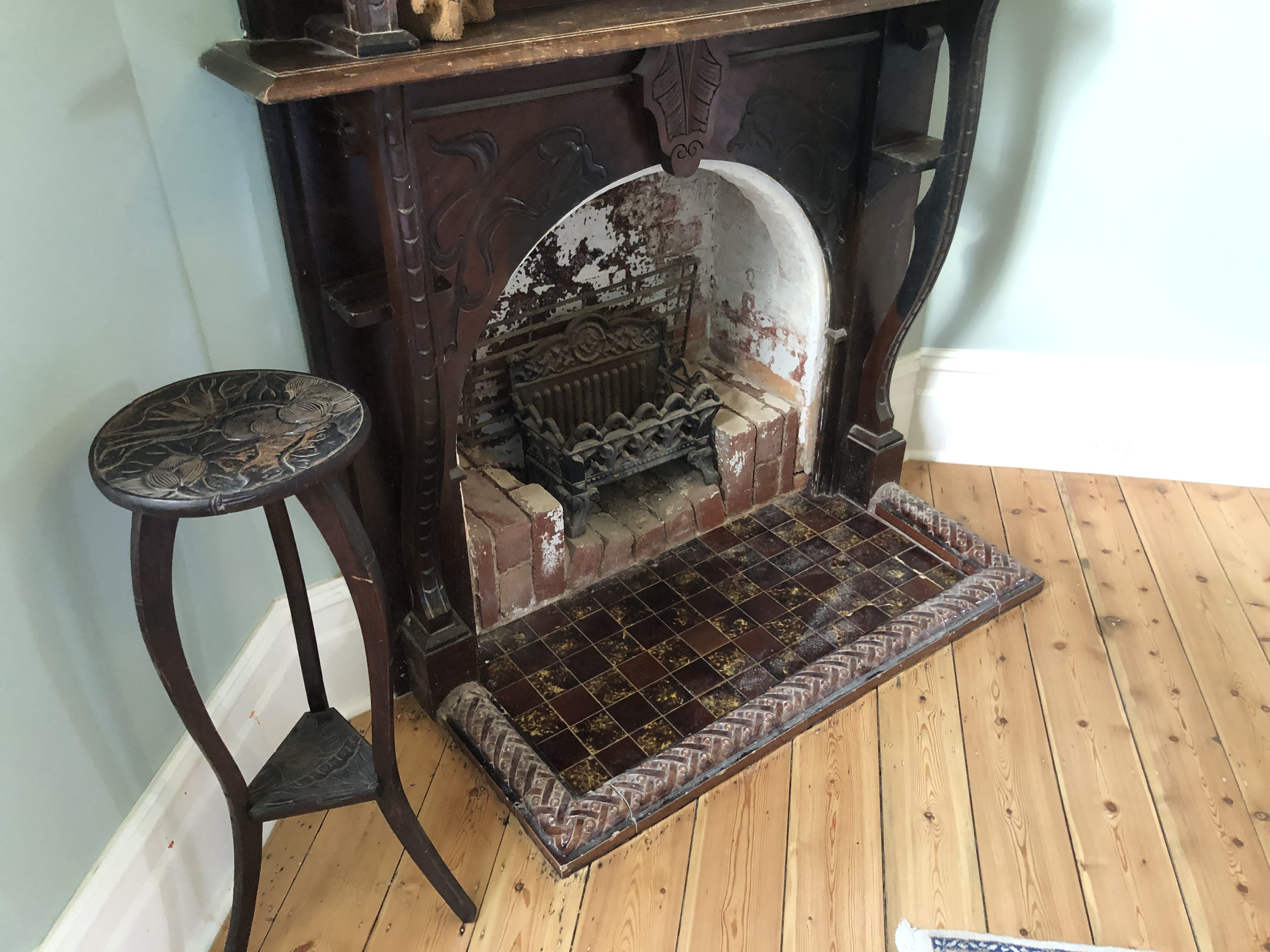
A fireplace in one of the bedrooms

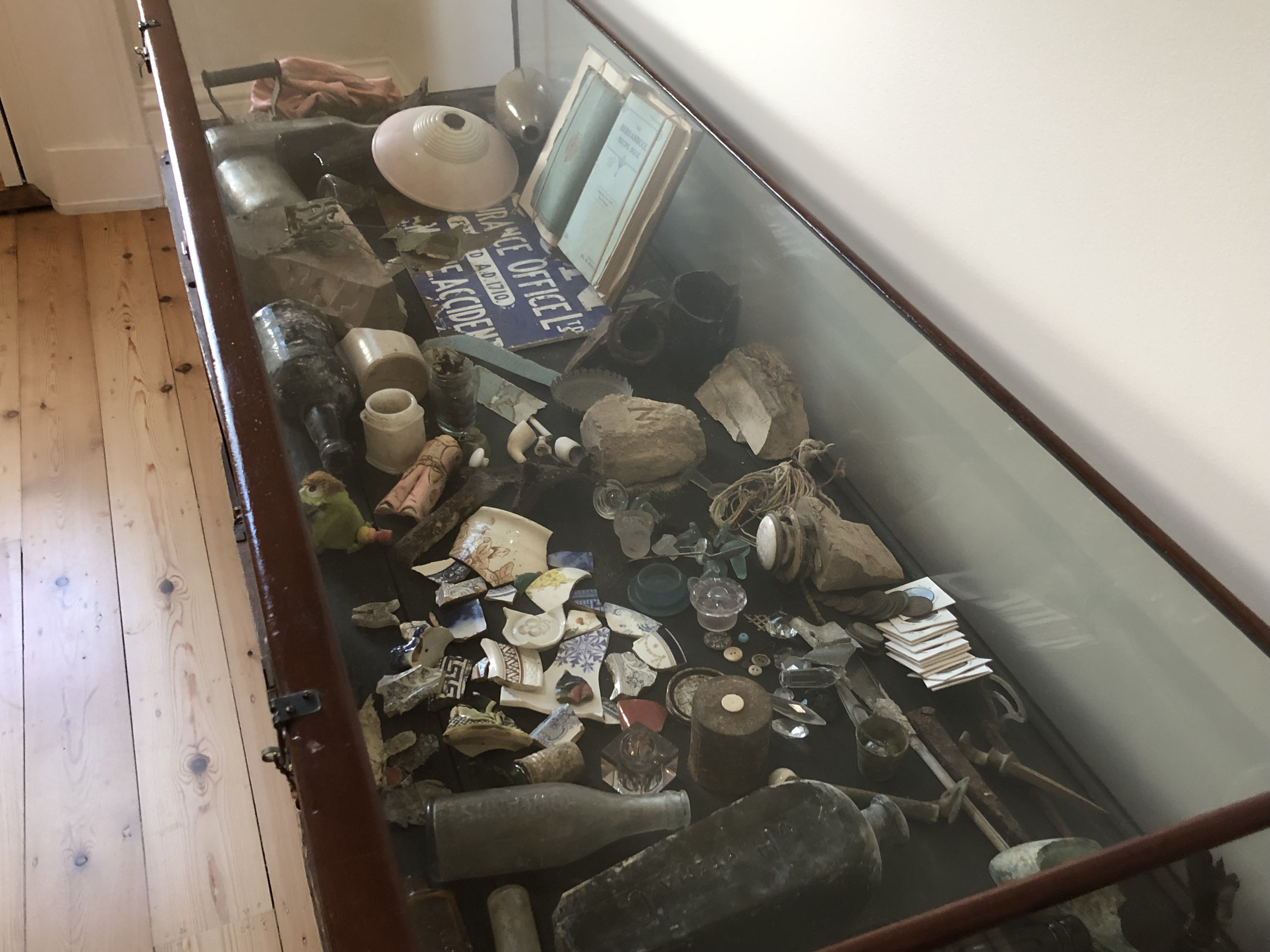
Artefacts found during the restoration process

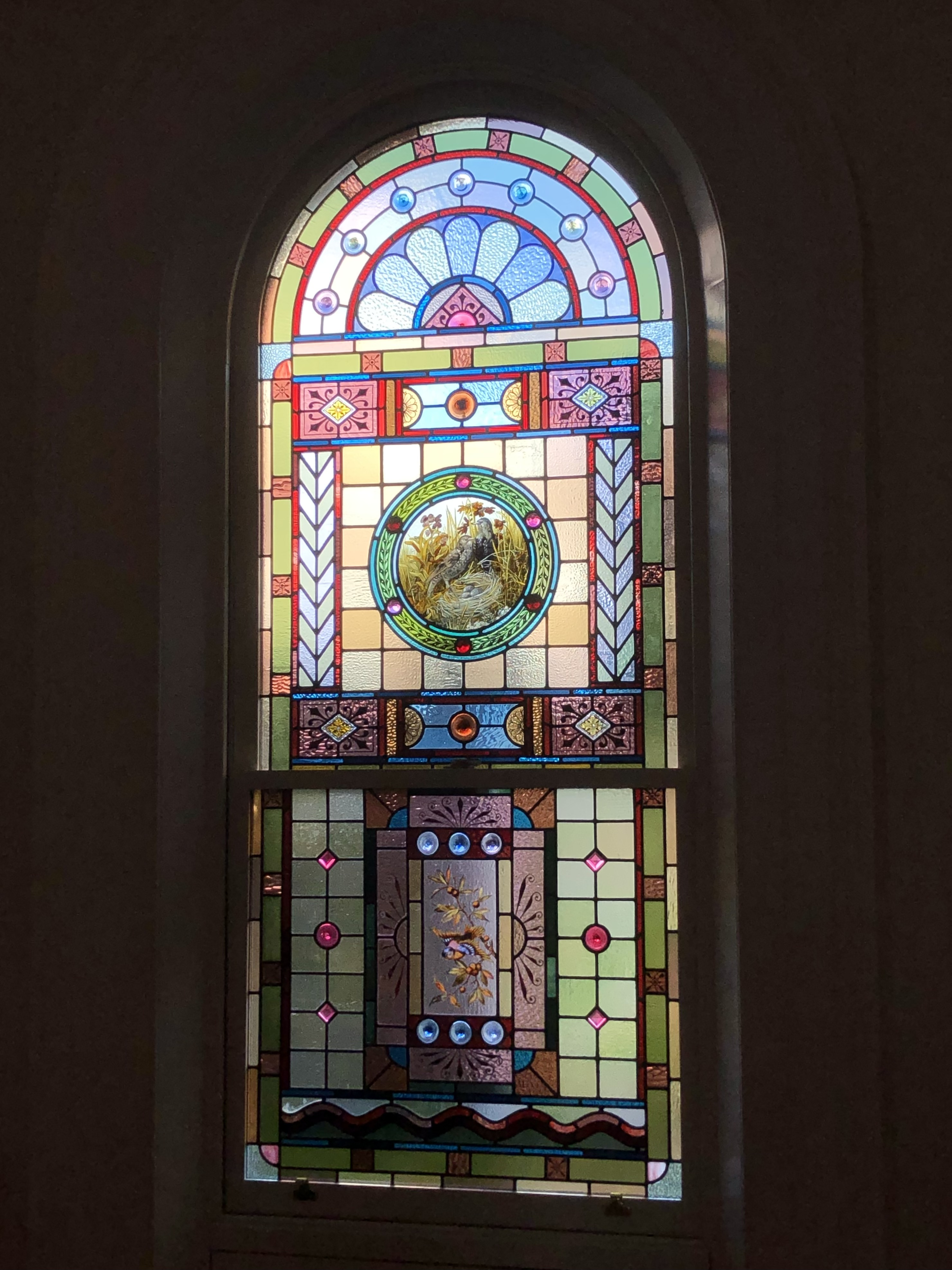
The stained glass telescopic window

== See also ==
- Brie Brie
- Chatsworth House
- Narrapumelap
- Werribee Park Mansion
