= Chatsworth House (Victoria) =

Historic homestead in Victoria, Australia

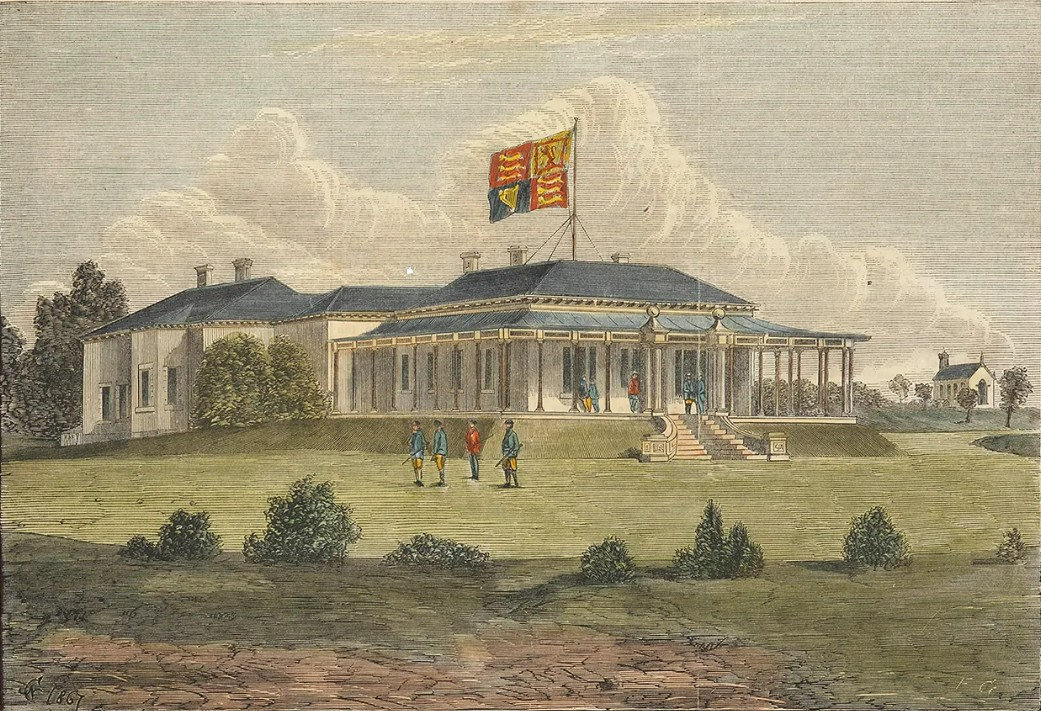
- Chatsworth House at the time of HRH Prince Alfred's visit, 1867

- Location in Moyne Shire, Victoria
- 37°50′58″S 142°37′02″E
- Type: Homestead, associated built facilities and grounds
- Location: Chatsworth, Victoria, Australia
- Nearest city: Warrnambool

History
- Built: 1859-1861
- Built for: John Moffatt

Site notes
- Architect: James Henry Fox
- Architectural style: Neoclassical

Victorian Heritage Register
- Official name: Chatsworth House
- Type: State heritage (built and natural)
- Designated: 9 October 1974
- Reference no.: H0325

Chatsworth House is a heritage-listed nineteenth-century homestead located near Chatsworth, Victoria, Australia. Constructed between 1859 and 1861 for pastoralist John Moffatt, the bluestone mansion is regarded as one of the grandest pastoral homesteads in Victoria's Western District. Designed by architect James Henry Fox in a Classical Revival style and surrounded by an extensive landscaped garden attributed to Edward La Trobe Bateman, the house forms part of a substantial pastoral estate established during the expansion of the Victorian grazing industry.

== History ==
The land on which Chatsworth House stands formed part of the extensive "Hopkins' Hill" pastoral run, which was occupied during the early years of European settlement in Victoria's Western District. The run was gradually consolidated by Scottish-born pastoralist John Mofatt, who arrived in the Port Phillip District in 1839 and accumulated considerable pastoral holdings through stock breeding and land acquisition. By the late 1850s Moffatt controlled both the "Grange" and "Hopkins' Hill" estates, making him one of the region's most prominent landowners.

In 1859, Moffatt commenced construction of a substantial homestead on the Hopkins Hill estate. Designed by architect James Henry Fox, the mansion was built from locally quarried bluestone in a restrained Classical Revival style. Construction took approximately two years and cost around £20,000, making it one of the most expensive rural residences erected in colonial Victoria at the time. Moffatt named the house after "Chatsworth House", the ancestral seat of the Dukes of Devonshire, in Derbyshire, England.

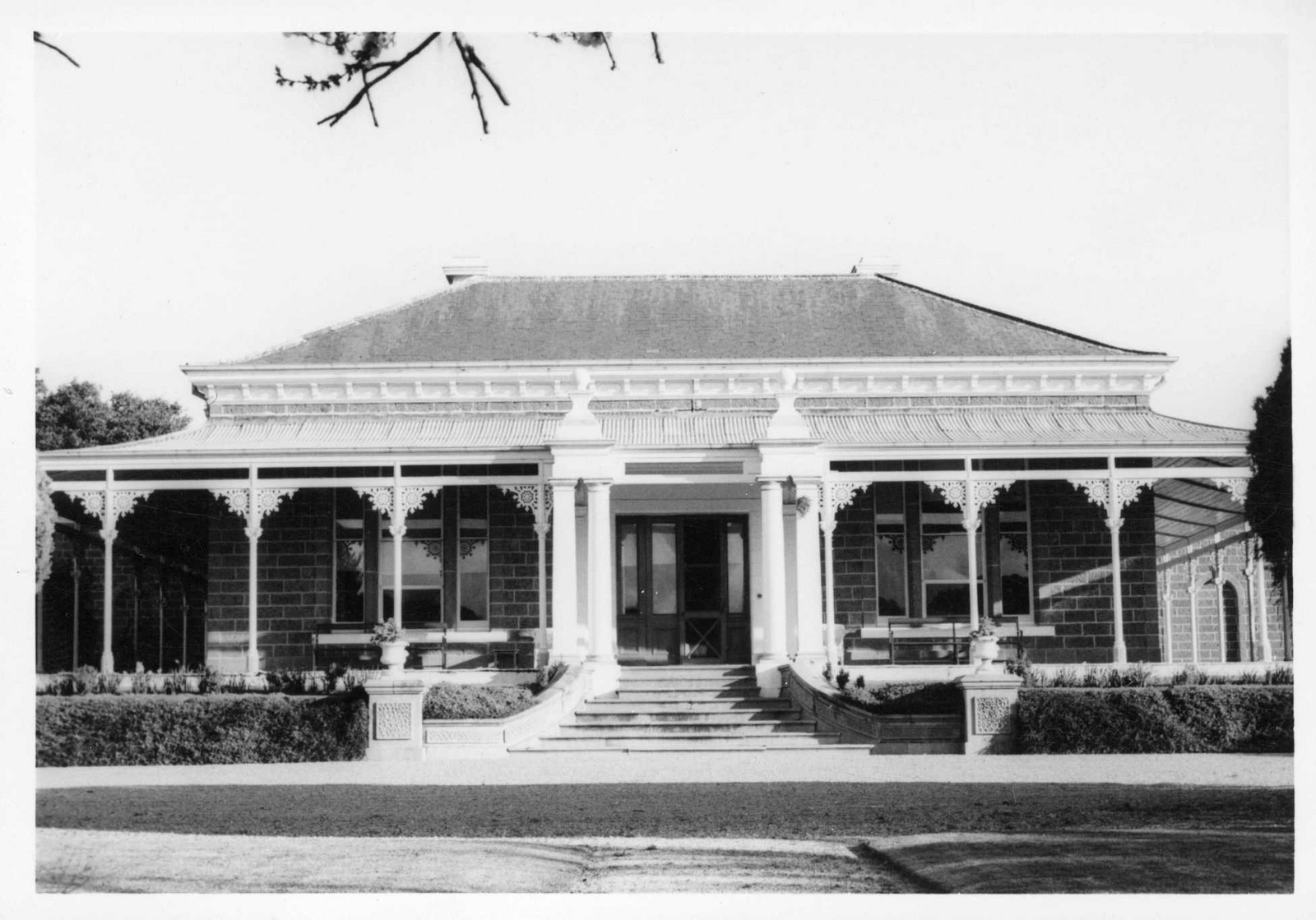
The front view of the house (1967)

The homestead was conceived as the centrepiece of a large pastoral estate. In addition to the main residence, extensive bluestone stables, men's quarters and service buildings were erected. The surrounding grounds were laid out in an ornamental landscape, with Edward La Trobe Bateman engaged to design pleasure gardens around the house. Thousands of trees, shrubs and ornamental plants were introduced to the property. Trees in the garden include Monterey cypress, pine, cedar, carob, Bentham's cypress, weeping Mexican cypress, cork oak, soap dogwood, soap bursaria, willow bottlebrush, prickly juniper, oaks, figs, river red gums and blue gums.

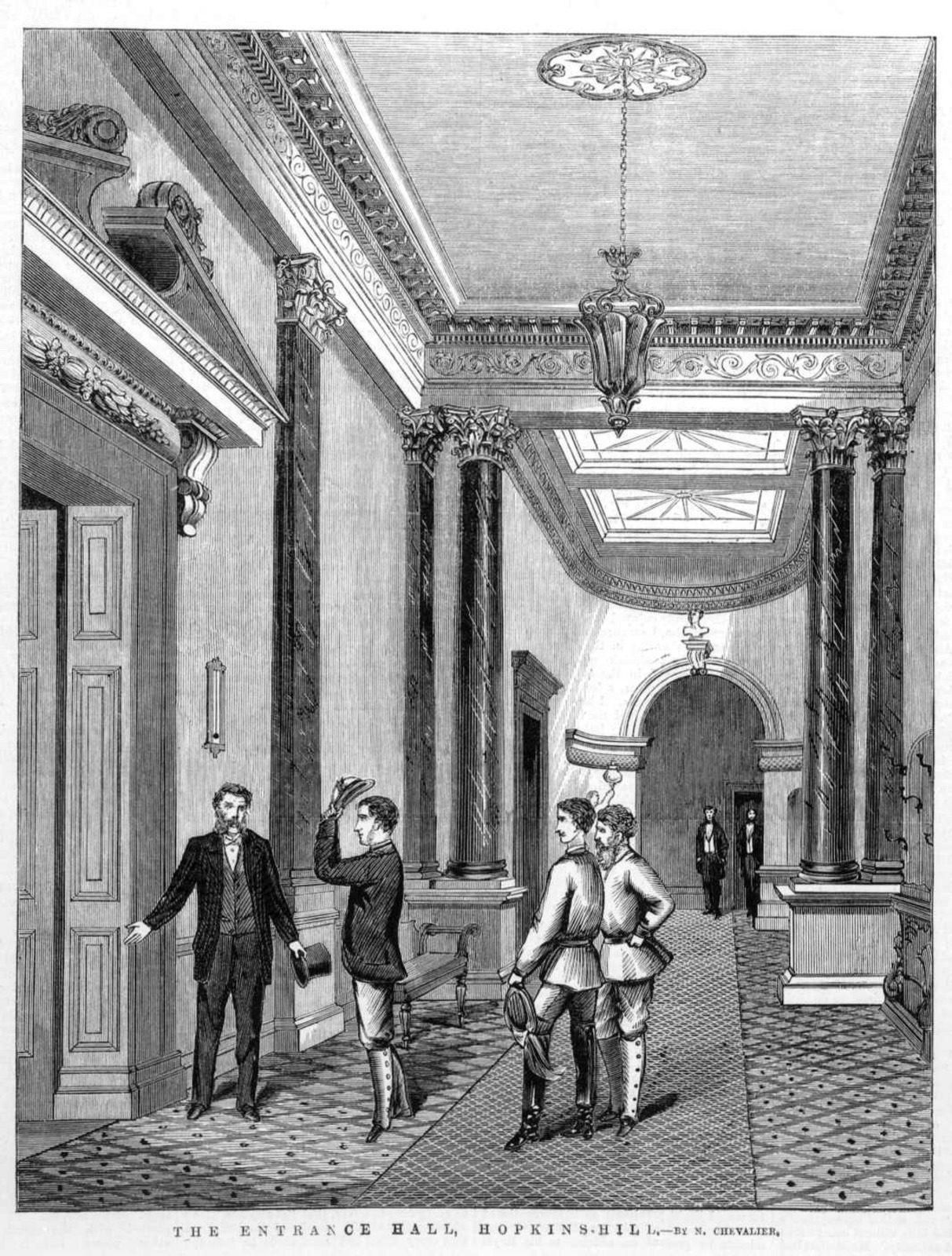
Entrance Hall of Chatsworth House (engraving)

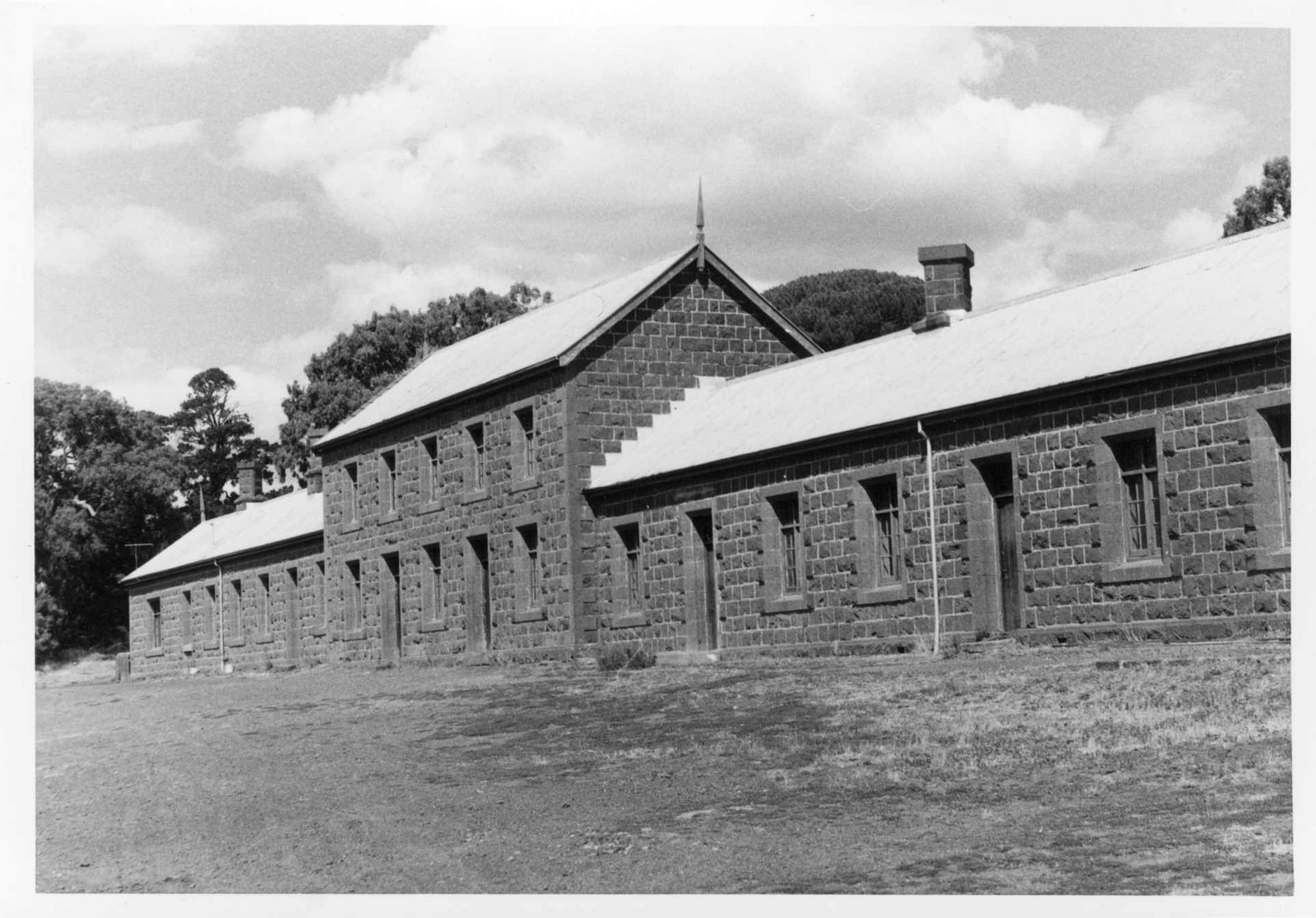
The staff quarters

Chatsworth House became an important social centre within the district during the nineteenth century. In 1867, the property hosted Prince Alfred, Duke of Edinburgh, during his tour of Victoria. Preparations for the visit included the acquisition of a substantial library and accommodation for numerous guests. Melbourne-based bookseller George Robertson received an order via telegram for a ton of leather-bound books, chosen at George's discretion, for the impending visit. During the prince's stay, kangaroo hunting expeditions and celebratory events were held on the estate, including three giant bonfires which burned through 200 tonnes of firewood, and the prince planted a commemorative tree within the grounds.

John Moffatt died in 1871 in Galle, British Ceylon (present-day Sri Lanka), while returning to Australia from Britain. His pastoral holdings, valued at approximately £350,000, were subsequently administered by trustees. Although ownership of the wider estate changed over time, Chatsworth House remained associated with the Moffatt family into the twentieth century. In 1903 the Moffatt estate was subdivided and sold in several large allotments, with Chatsworth House and adjoining 'Berrambool' purchased by William and John Moffatt. The last Moffatt descendants, Mary and Edith Moffatt (William's granddaughters) continued to occupy the house until the 1950s.

During the twentieth century portions of the estate were progressively sold, particularly post-World War II and the size of the original holding was reduced as a result of the Soldier Settlement Scheme. Ownership passed through a succession of pastoral companies and private owners, including the Chatsworth House Pastoral Company. Over several decades the mansion experienced periods of decline, during which decorative finishes were altered and parts of the building deteriorated.

A program of restoration commenced after the property's acquisition by French-born, Melbourne-based businessman Jean Claude Desmet in 1993. Significant conservation works addressed structural issues, water damage, and the reinstatement of original interior colour schemes with the assistance of Jackie Robertson-Federowicz. Further restoration and pastoral improvements were undertaken following the purchase of the property by Russell and Lesley Jones in 2001.

The original Chatsworth schoolhouse was relocated to the property in 2008.

The property has been under ownership by Tom and Sarah Whinney since 2020.

The property has a small airfield, with the airfield given the ICAO-registered code "YCWO".

== See also ==
- Berrambool
- Salt Creek
- Narrapumelap
- Werribee Park Mansion
