= Salt Creek (Victoria) =

Historic homestead in Victoria, Australia

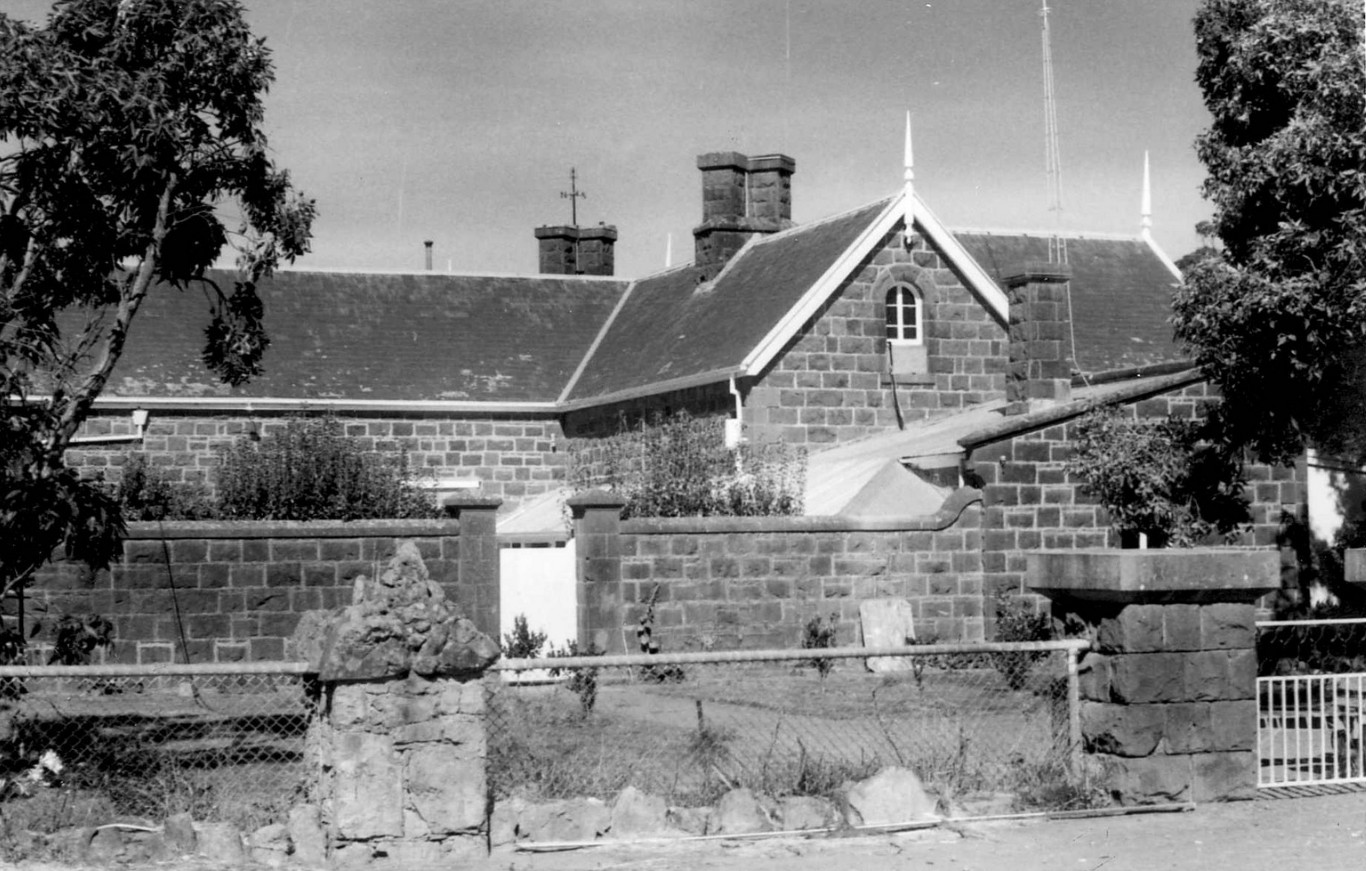
- Rear of the Salt Creek Homestead, 1981

- Location in Moyne Shire, Victoria
- 37°53′53″S 142°47′34″E
- Type: Homestead, associated built facilities and grounds
- Location: Woorndoo, Victoria, Australia
- Nearest city: Warrnambool

History
- Built: 1872
- Built for: Robert Grieve Armstrong

Salt Creek is a historic pastoral property and homestead near Woorndoo, Victoria, Australia. Established during the nineteenth century as part of the extensive pastoral holdings of pastoralist John Moffatt, the property later became one of the principal sheep stations owned by the Coy family. The estate, with its 1872 homestead, has been closely associated with wool production in Victoria's Western District for more than a century and has undergone substantial subdivision, soldier settlement and agricultural development while remaining an important pastoral property.

== History ==
The land that became Salt Creek formed part of the extensive pastoral empire assembled by John Moffatt, a shepherd, overseer and pastoralist associated with the Clyde Company. During his lifetime Moffatt accumulated several of the Western District's largest grazing properties, including Hopkins Hill (Chatsworth House), Berrambool and Salt Creek. When he died near Ceylon in 1871, his estate was valued at approximately £350,000, making it one of the largest fortunes in colonial Victoria. Under the terms of his will, however, the estate could not be wound up until the deaths of several beneficiaries who were entitled to receive income from it, delaying its eventual disposal for more than three decades.

The original Salt Creek homestead was completed in 1872, and was the home of Robert Grieve Armstrong and his wife, who leased the property from Moffatt's estate. Robert died on 1 June 1886, and the property was then leased by Peter McIntyre and his sons during the 1890s.

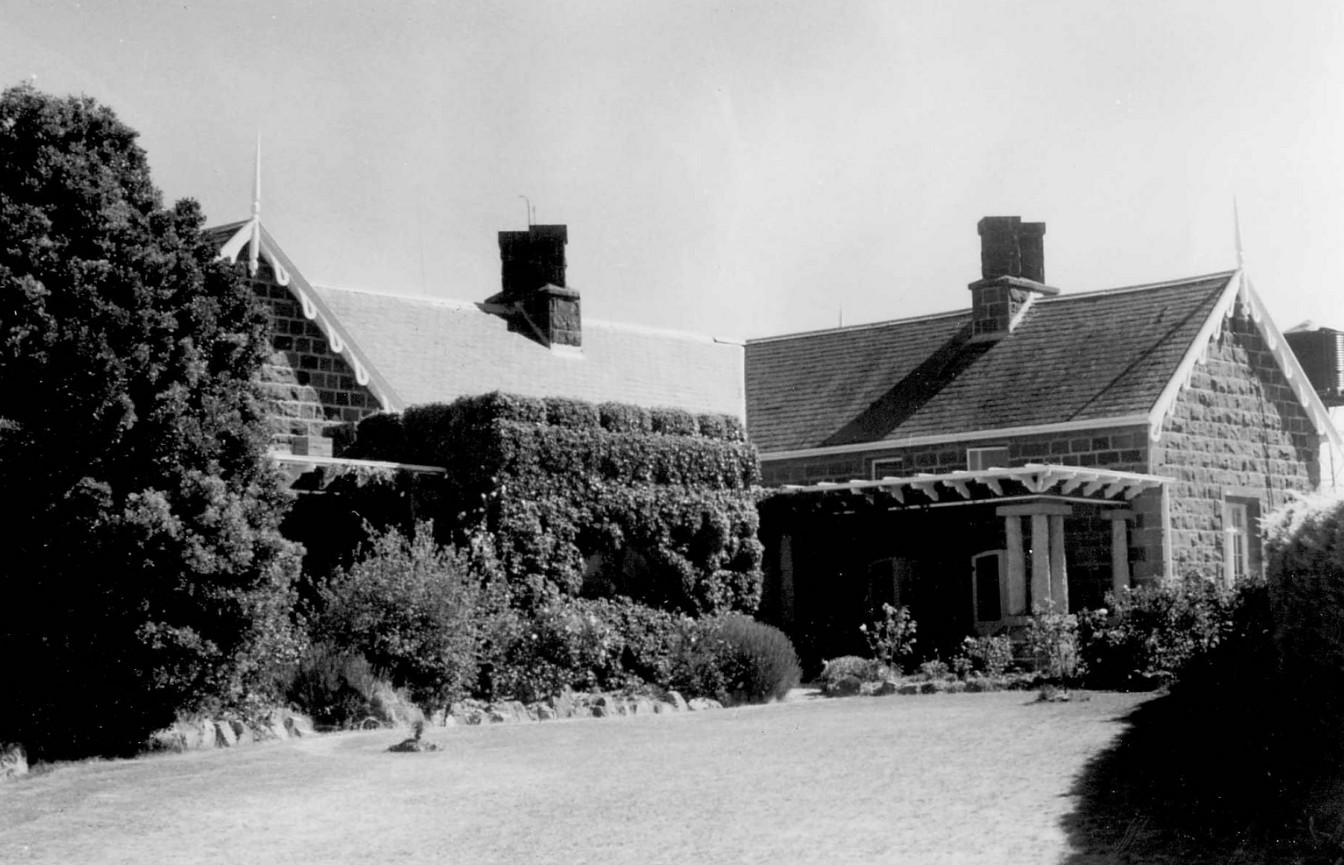
The front of the homestead

When the Moffatt estate was finally dissolved in 1903, its major pastoral properties were offered for sale and subdivision. Salt Creek was initially offered at auction at the Wool Exchange in Melbourne but was passed in after bidding reached £2 17s 6d per acre. Over the following years portions of the estate were progressively sold in smaller allotments. By February 1906, eleven families had purchased small farming blocks from part of the estate with the intention of establishing permanent settlements.

In April 1905, the trustees of the Moffatt estate sold the remaining 7,100-acre balance of Salt Creek, together with the homestead, woolshed and other improvements, to Messrs. Coy Brothers of Terang.

The purchase marked the beginning of the property's long association with the Coy family. Frederick Charles ("F. C.") Coy had arrived in Terang in 1885 as a 14-year-old to work for the general merchants Matthew Lang. In 1890 he and his brother Henry Coy acquired Lang's business and rapidly expanded it into one of the district's largest commercial enterprises. Trading as Coy Brothers, the business operated several stores in Terang, selling groceries, ironmongery, furniture, timber, grain, wines and spirits. In 1905 the citizens of Terang formed a cooperative to purchase the business from the Coy brothers, enabling them to concentrate on pastoral pursuits.

Frederick and Henry Coy purchased the property for approximately £3 per acre. Frederick subsequently bought out his brother's interest before acquiring an additional 4,500 acres (1,820 ha) adjoining the western boundary, managing both properties as a single enterprise. He later expanded his pastoral holdings further through the purchase of the neighbouring 5,000-acre Woorndoo Park property from the Geddes family near Lake Bolac.

Frederick Coy married Helen Pimlet of Camperdown, who inherited a share of the Kurweeton estate comprising approximately 8,000 acres (3,237 ha). By the 1930s the family controlled approximately 25,000 acres (10,117 ha) across three Western District properties. Salt Creek became renowned for its Merino sheep, with stud ewes sourced from Carngham and rams purchased from Barunah Plains. Frederick and Helen raised 8 children while continuing to expand and improve the property.

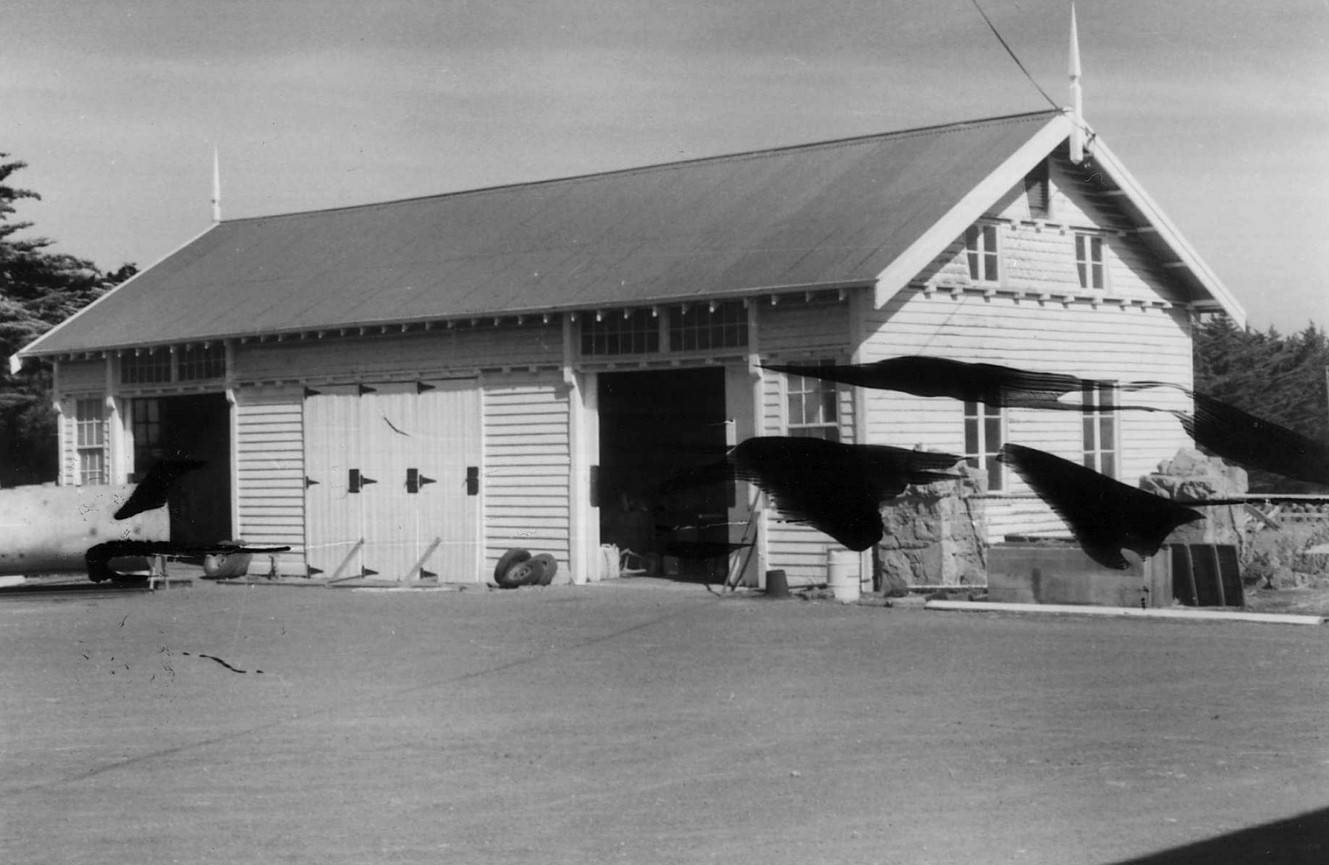
The coach house

During the Coy family's ownership, the original 1872 homestead was substantially enlarged at a cost of approximately £6,000.

Salt Creek was severely affected by the devastating Western Victorian bushfires of January 1944, one of the worst fire disasters in the state's history. Most of the property was burnt, approximately 7,000 sheep were killed and almost all fencing across the station was destroyed. Around 1,000 acres of grassland were burnt, together with the men's huts, although volunteer firefighters succeeded in saving the valuable woolshed despite its walls being scorched by the flames. A groom employed on the estate lost £230 when his hut was destroyed.

Following the fires, Frederick Coy introduced a comprehensive rebuilding program designed to reduce future fire damage. A concrete-post factory was established on the property, heavy wire droppers were adopted and extensive fire-resistant fencing was erected. Many of these fences remained in use decades later.

In 1953, the Soldier Settlement Commission compulsorily acquired 7,500 acres (3,035 ha) of Salt Creek for subdivision among returned servicemen. Frederick Coy opposed the acquisition, arguing that his property should be exempt because he had 8 children, including two sons who had served in both world wars. Despite his objections, the acquisition proceeded as part of the final stages of Victoria's soldier settlement program.

Frederick Coy continued to work actively on the property into old age. Around 1950, while supervising sheep dipping, he rested on a drum containing arsenic used in the dipping process. Arsenic remaining on the lid caused severe chemical burns, which entered his system and ultimately led to his death about a year later, on 3 May 1951.

Management of Salt Creek had already begun passing to the next generation before Frederick's death. Frank Coy assumed responsibility for the property in 1940, remaining in charge until 1966, when management passed to Peter Coy, then aged 24. Frank Coy died in 1976.

In the twenty-first century the property has continued as a working pastoral enterprise under the management of Tom Wilson, Peter Coy's godson, who operates the station with a small permanent workforce supplemented by casual employees, including international backpackers via the online platform Workaway.

== Gallery ==
Interior of the Salt Creek Homestead (1981)
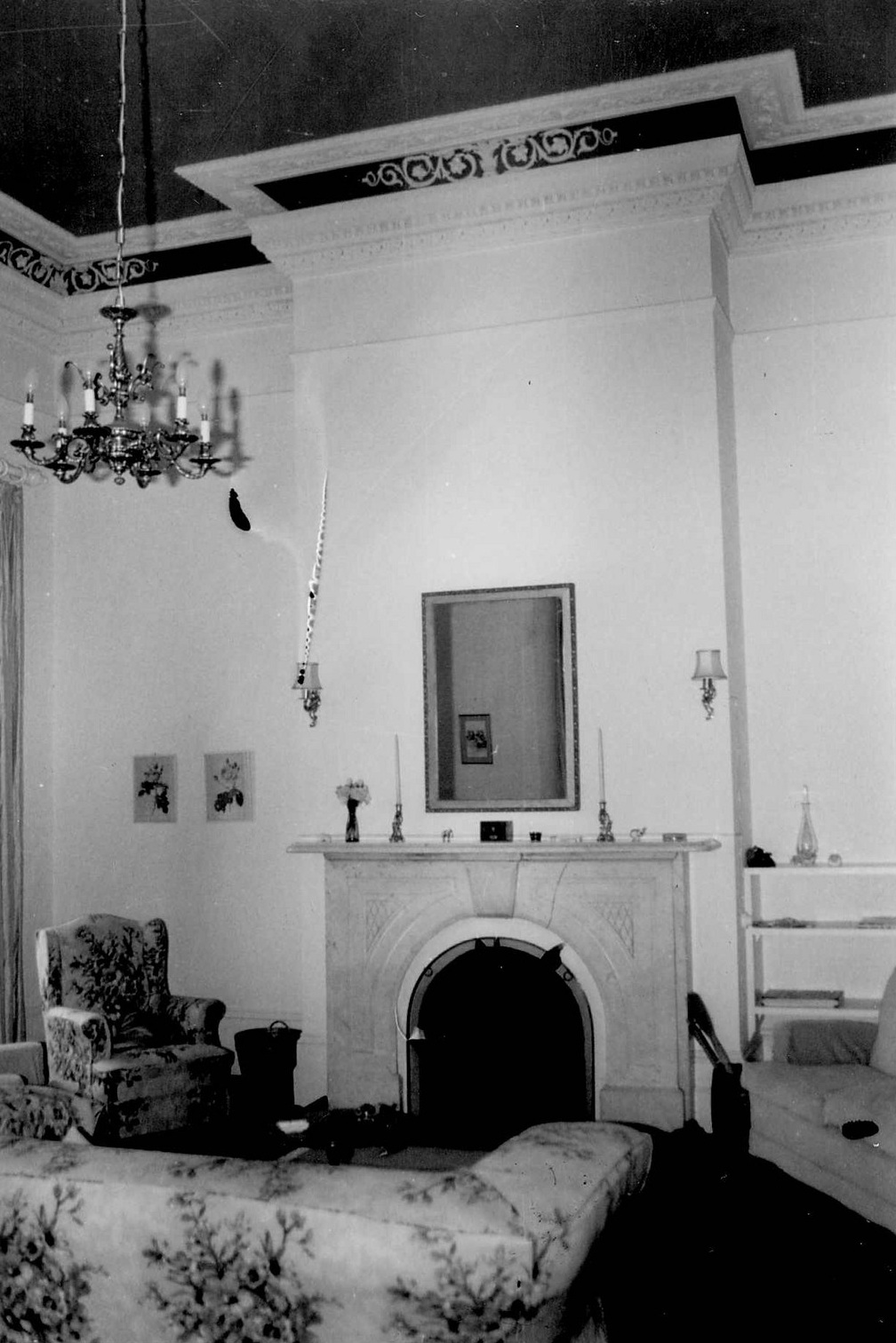
Living room, including bay window

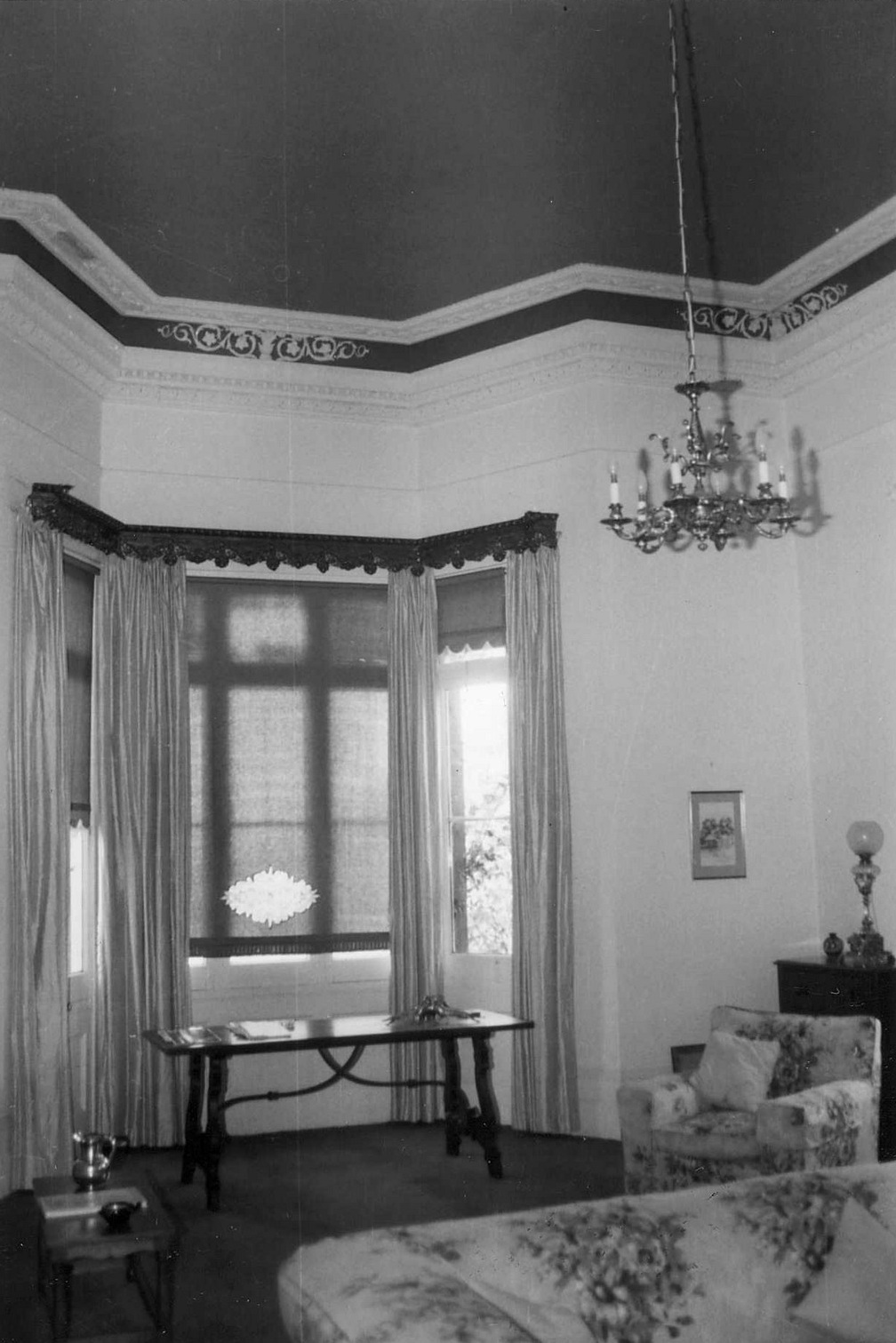
Living room, including fireplace

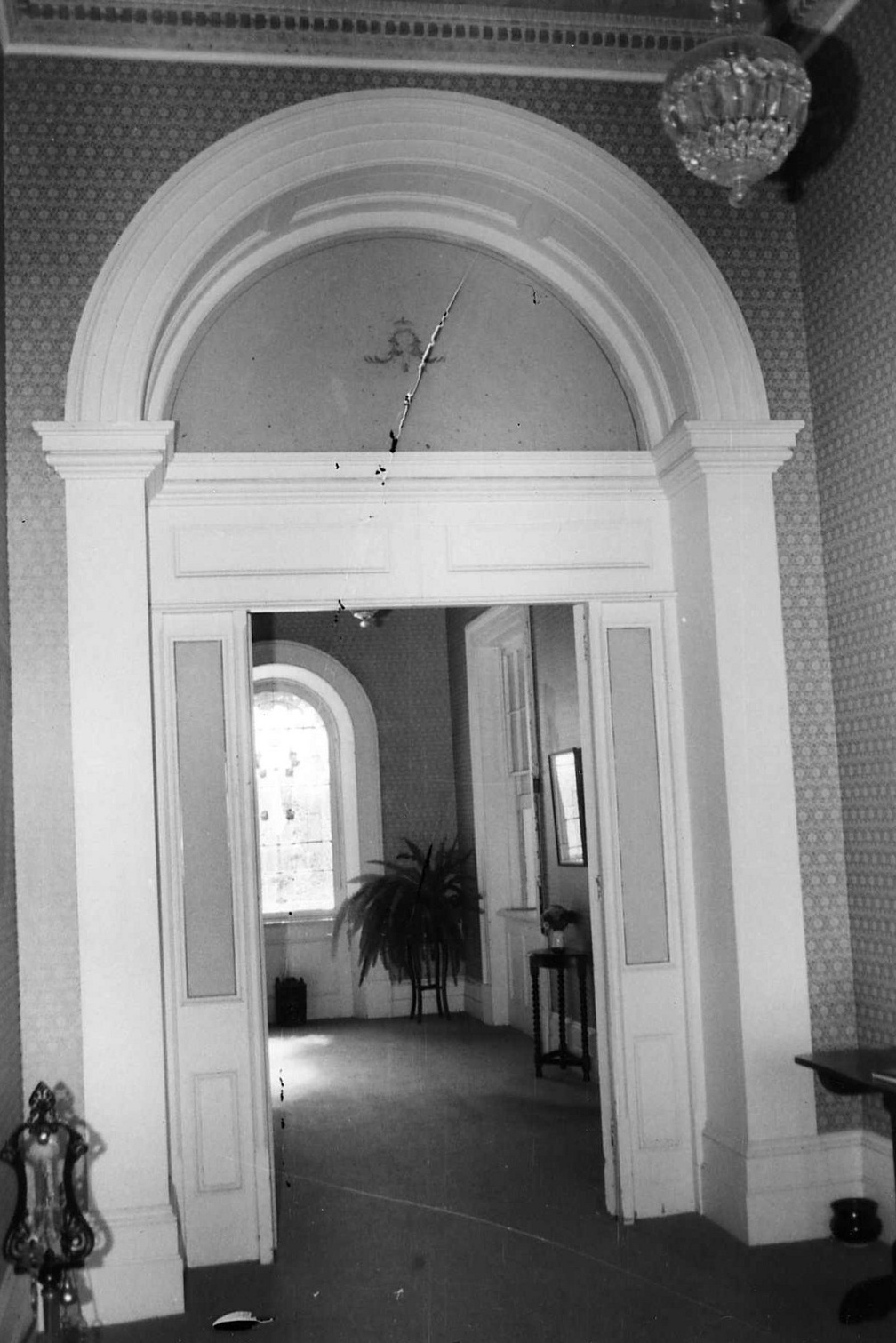
archway

== See also ==
- Berrambool
- Chatsworth House
- Merrang
