= Woorndoo =

- Town
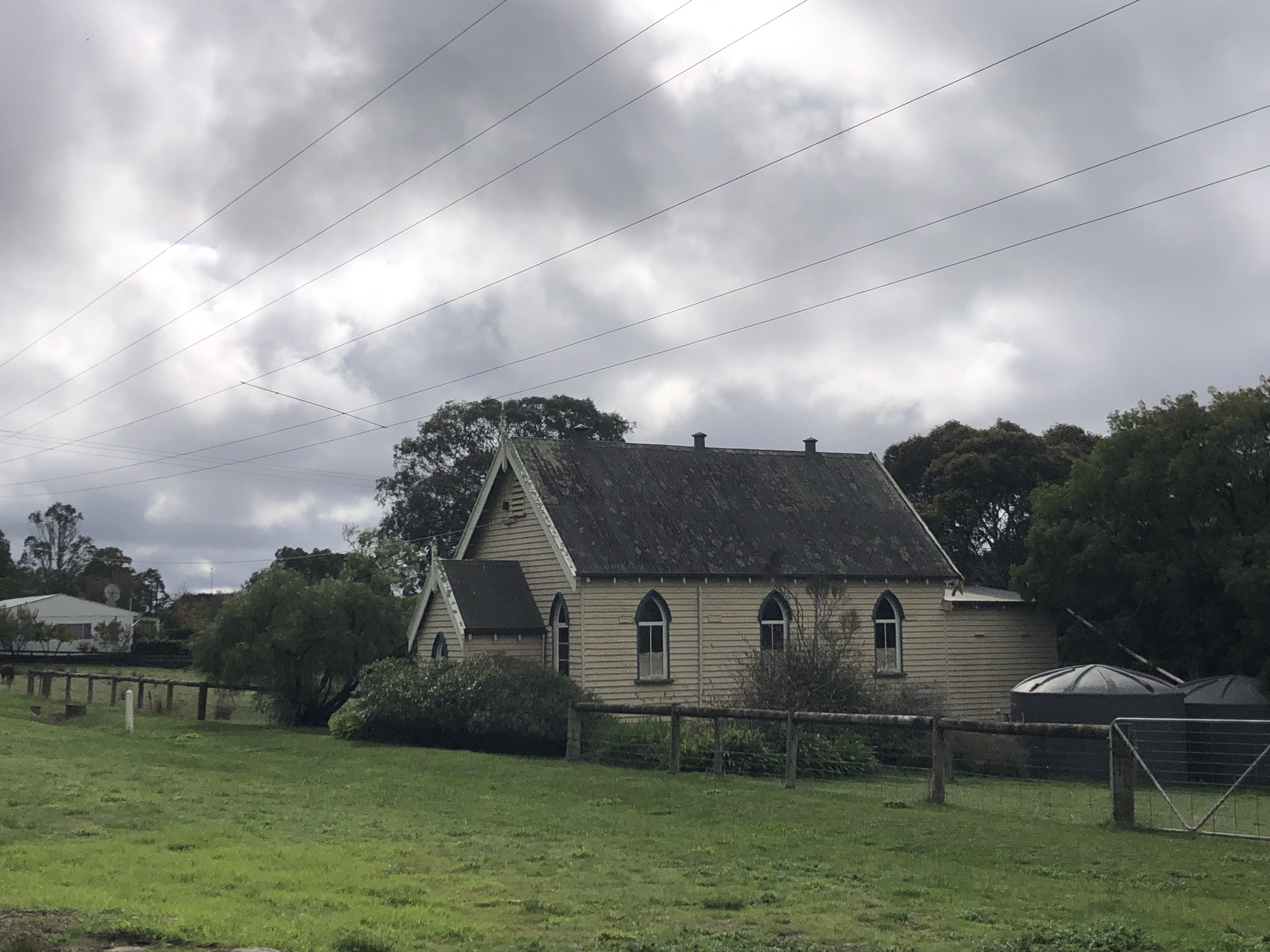
- The former Woorndoo Uniting Church

- Coordinates: 37°52′0″S 142°47′0″E
- Country: Australia
- State: Victoria
- LGA: Shire of Moyne
- Location: 259 km (161 mi) W of Melbourne; 74 km (46 mi) N of Warrnambool; 24 km (15 mi) N of Mortlake

Government
  - State electorate: Lowan
  - Federal division: Wannon

Population
  - Total: 169 (2016 census)
- Postcode: 3272

Woorndoo (/ˈwɔːrnduː/) is a town in the Western District of Victoria, Australia. The town is in the Shire of Moyne local government area, 259 kilometres (161 mi) west of the state capital, Melbourne. At the 2016 census, Woorndoo and the surrounding area had a population of 169. The population of the town proper is around 50.

Woorndoo Post Office opened on 15 June 1866 and closed in 1996. A Post Office at Woorndoo Upper opened around 1902 and closed in 1946.

The town in conjunction with neighbouring township Mortlake has an Australian Rules football team Woorndoo-Mortlake competing in the Mininera & District Football League.

== Traditional ownership ==
The formally recognised traditional owners for the area in which Woorndoo sits are the Eastern Maar people, who are represented by the Eastern Maar Aboriginal Corporation.

== See also ==
- Salt Creek
