= John Dickson Wyselaskie =

Australian benefactor and grazier

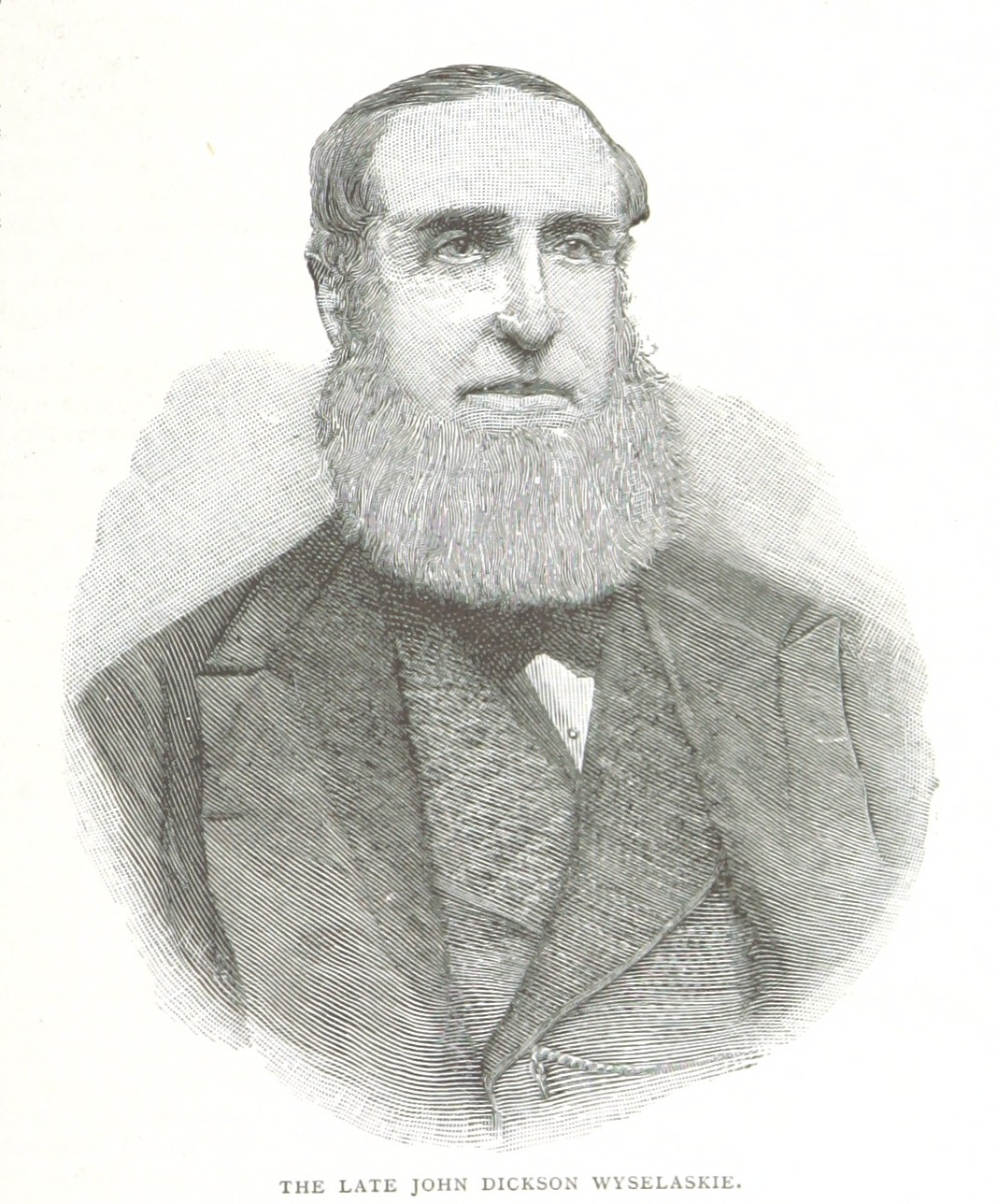
An 1888 drawing of Wyselaskie

John Dickson Wyselaskie (25 June 1818 – 4 May 1883) was an Australian benefactor and grazier. Wyselaskie was born in Sanquhar, Dumfriesshire, Scotland, and died in St Kilda, Victoria. He is buried at the Boroondara Cemetery, where an outstanding memorial was erected in his honour.

== See also ==
- James Alexander Gibson
- Mars Buckley
