= Talindert =

Historic homestead in Victoria, Australia

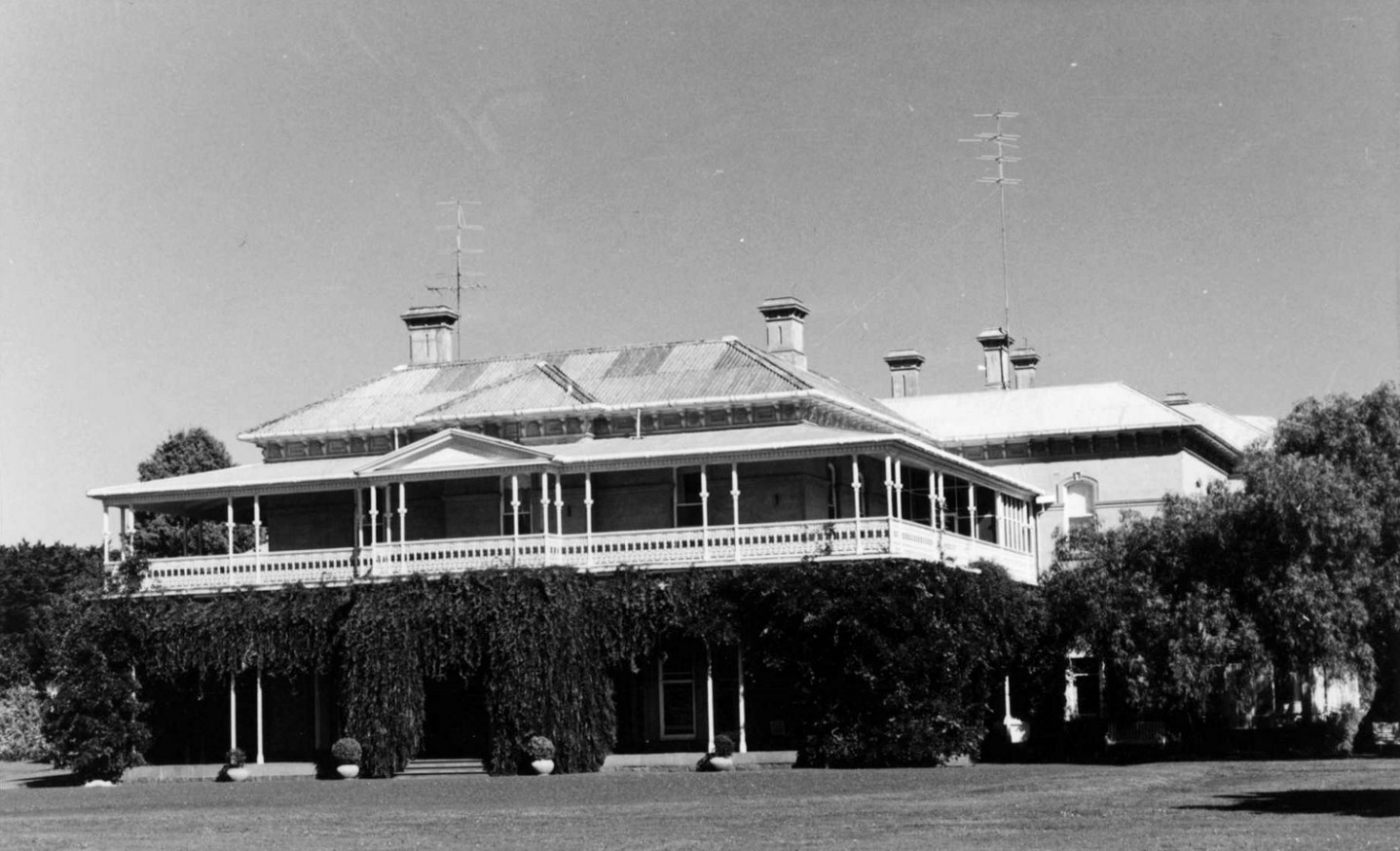
- Talindert Homestead

- Location in Corangamite Shire, Victoria
- 38°15′52″S 143°10′44″E
- Type: Homestead, associated built facilities and grounds
- Location: Camperdown, Victoria, Australia
- Nearest city: Colac

History
- Built: 1890
- Built for: James Chester Manifold

Site notes
- Architect: Alexander Hamilton
- Architectural style: Italianate

Talindert is a historic pastoral homestead near Camperdown, Victoria, Australia. Established in 1890 following the subdivision of the pioneering Purrumbete pastoral run, the estate was built for politician and pastoralist James Chester Manifold and has remained closely associated with the prominent Manifold family. Designed by Colac architect Alexander Hamilton and later enlarged by Guyon Purchas, the 33-room mansion is regarded as one of western Victoria's most significant late nineteenth-century homesteads. The property has also been associated with several prominent figures in Victorian public life, including Sir Chester Manifold, and is recognised for both its architectural significance and its contribution to the pastoral and political history of the Camperdown district.

== History ==
Talindert originated as part of the extensive Purrumbete pastoral run established by brothers John, Peter and Thomas Manifold, who became the first European settlers in the Camperdown district after taking up land around Lake Purrumbete at the end of 1838. During the late 1880s the Purrumbete estate was divided into four major holdings among members of the Manifold family. One of these became Talindert, which was allocated to James Chester Manifold, a son of pioneer pastoralist John Manifold.

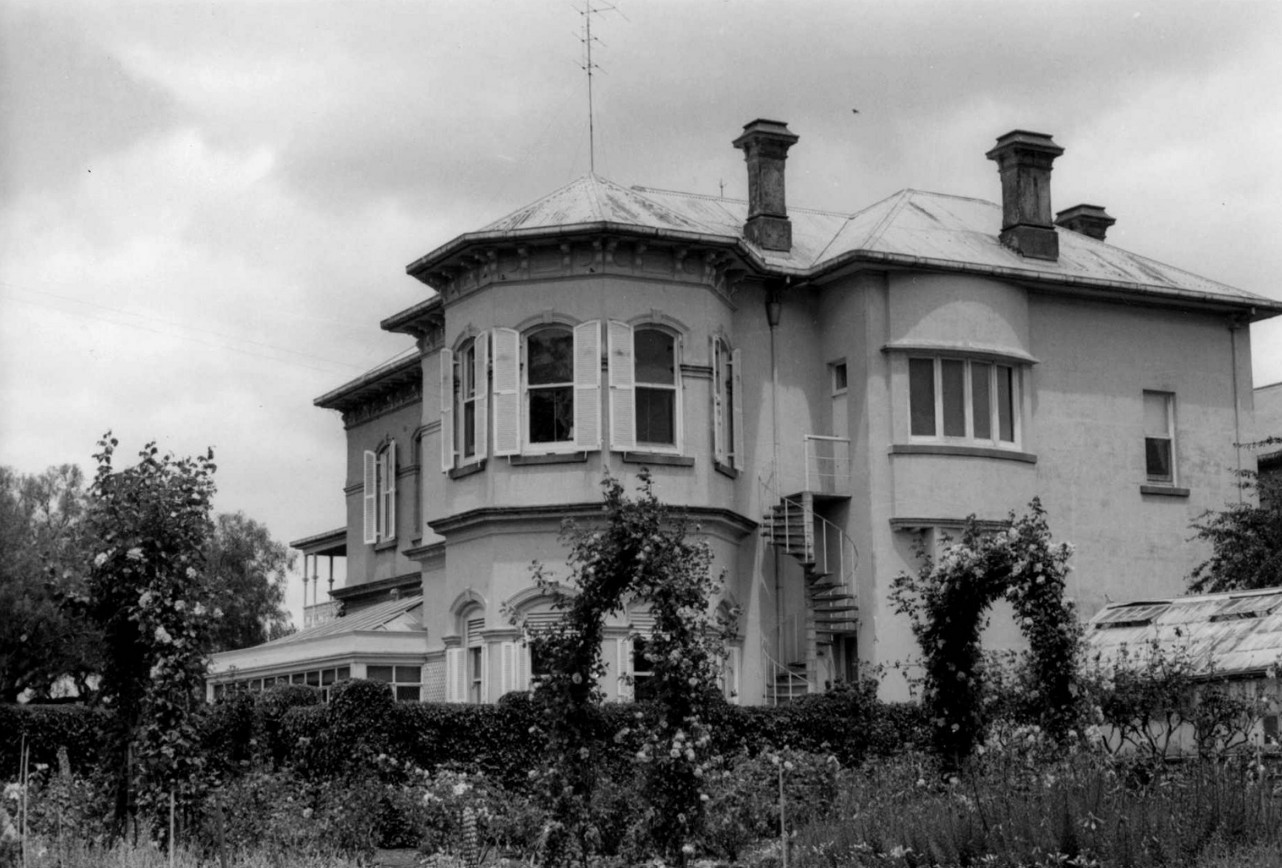
The rear of the homestead

James Chester Manifold (1867−1918) was a pastoralist, public benefactor and politician who played an influential role in the development of Victoria's dairy industry and later served in federal politics. In 1890 he commissioned the construction of Talindert Homestead, a substantial 33-room, two-storey mansion designed by Colac architect Alexander Hamilton. Built of stucco and brick in the Italianate style, the residence became one of Hamilton's largest and most important commissions, rivalled only by nearby homesteads such as Wooriwyrite and Wiridgil. One of its most distinctive architectural features is the wide encircling cast-iron verandah, manufactured by Cochrane and Scott, a feature more commonly associated with Melbourne's grand suburban mansions than rural homesteads.

Talindert remained James Chester Manifold's residence for the remainder of his life. In 1907 the house was substantially enlarged through additions designed by architect Guyon Purchas, further enhancing the scale of the homestead while retaining its original Italianate character.

Following James Chester Manifold's death in 1918, ownership passed to his only son, Thomas Chester Manifold, later Sir Chester Manifold KBE (1897−1979). Sir Chester became one of Victoria's best-known racing identities, serving for six years in the Victorian Parliament while also establishing a reputation as a successful racehorse owner and breeder. In 1961 he was appointed the inaugural chairman of the Victorian Totalisator Agency Board (TAB), and later became internationally known as the owner of the champion steeplechaser Crisp, which famously finished second in the 1973 English Grand National.

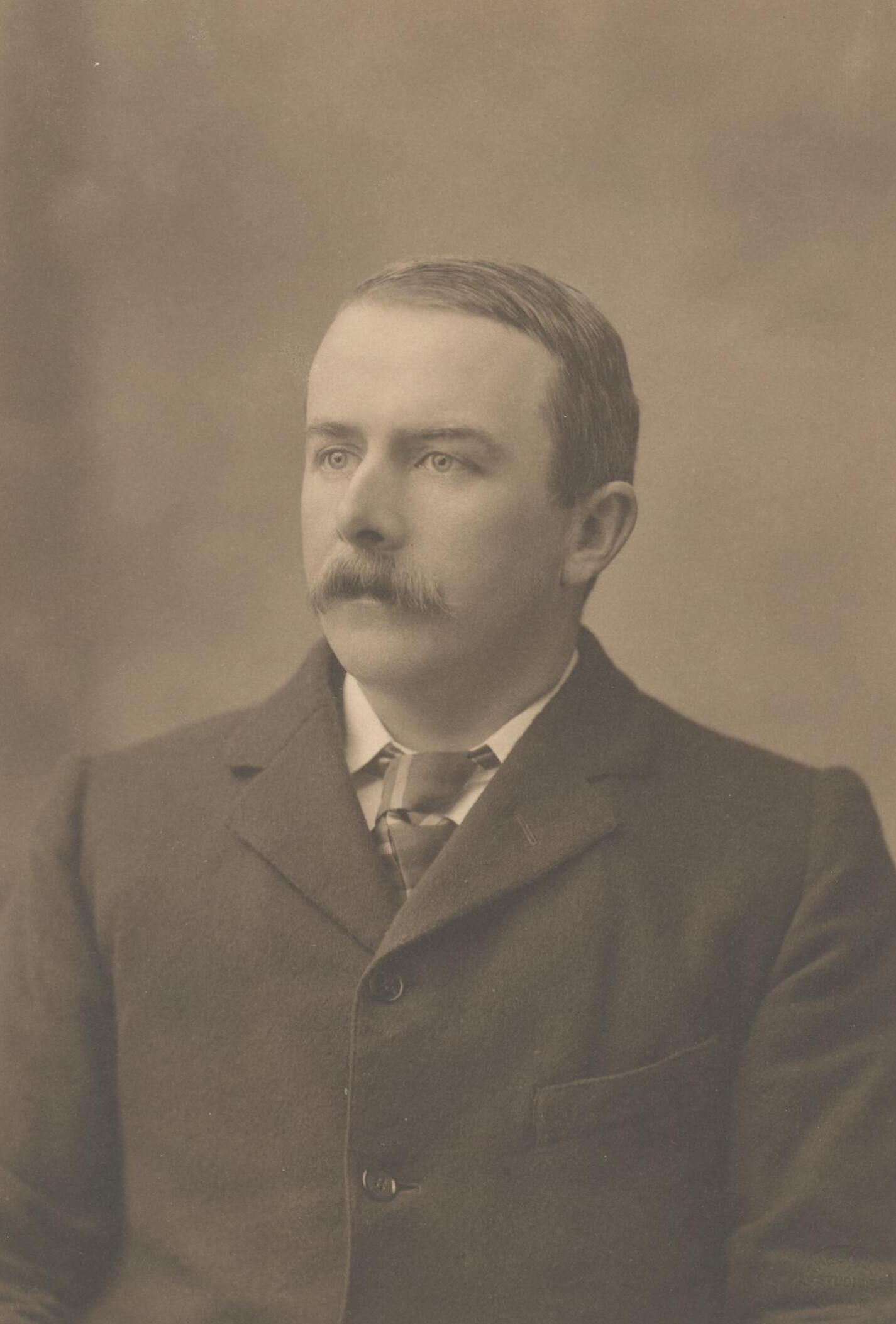
James Chester Manifold

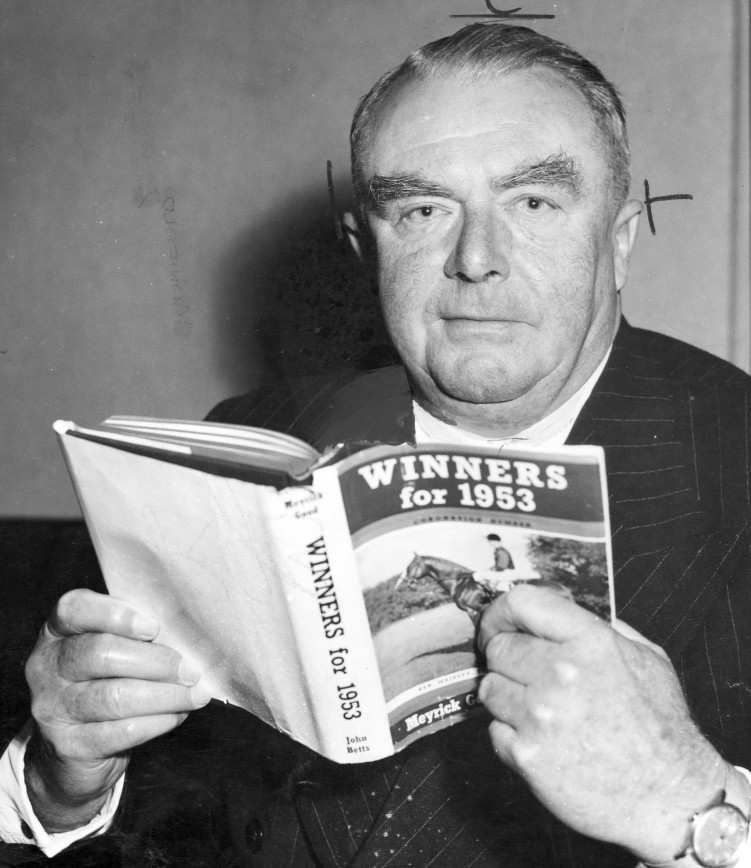
Sir (Thomas) Chester Manifold

Despite its prominence, the homestead experienced several notable incidents during the twentieth century. In April 1940, a fire caused considerable damage to the large residence. Members of the Camperdown Fire Brigade succeeded in bringing the blaze under control after about two hours, while valuable heirlooms, paintings and furniture were removed from the house before they could be damaged.

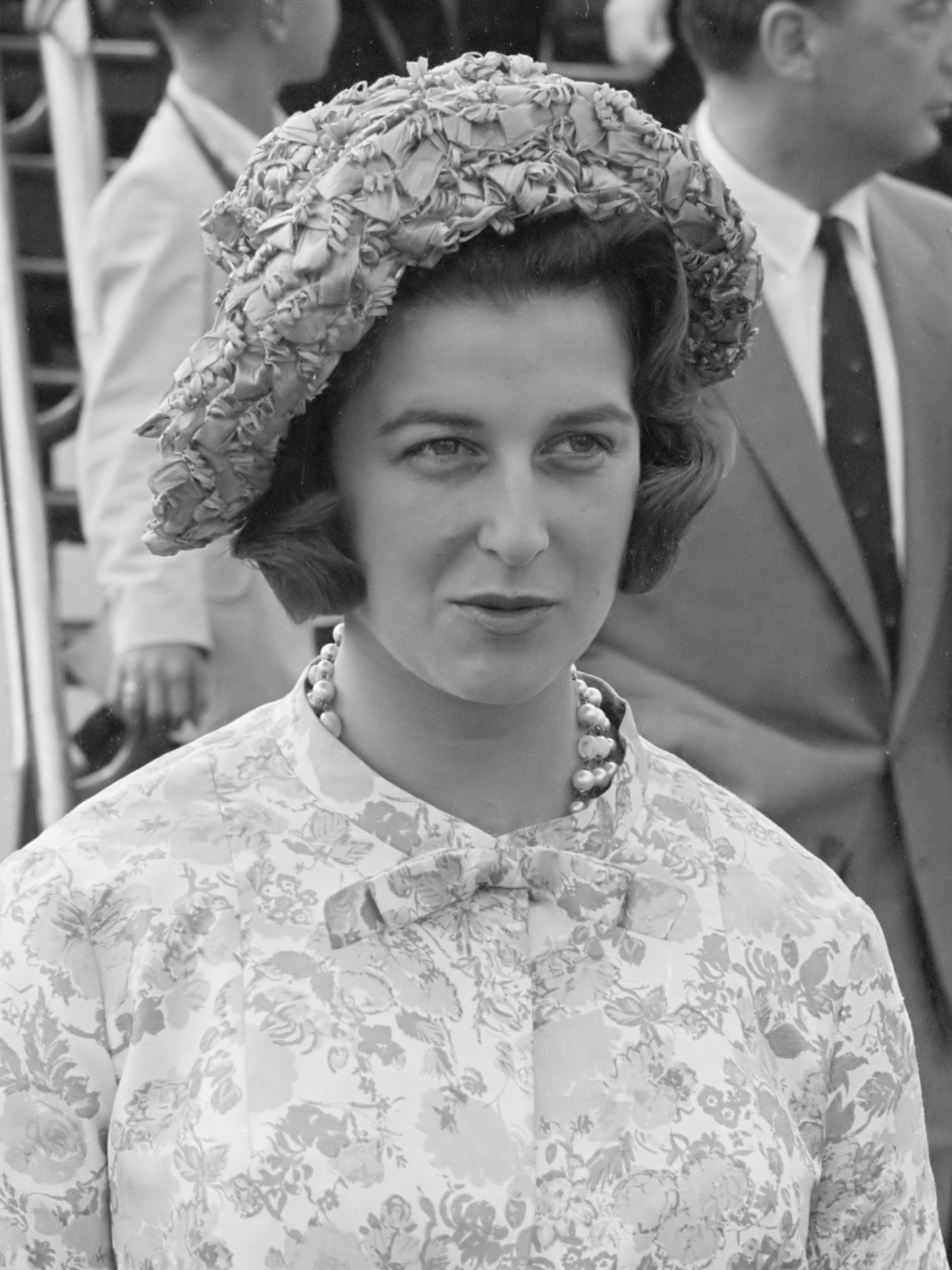
Princess Alexandra stayed at the property in 1959

During the 1946−1947 holiday period the estate's pumping station was vandalised after local boys broke into the building, damaging machinery that supplied the property with water. Police investigations resulted in two boys, aged 10 and 11, appearing before the Camperdown Children's Court in January 1947.

In September 1959, Princess Alexandra of Kent spent a private day at the property as the guest of Sir Chester and Lady Manifold during her official visit to Victoria.

Sir Chester Manifold's daughter, Sally Chester Emanuel, put Talindert up for sale in September 2019, and was purchased by a Melbourne family in November that year.

The homestead has remained notable for its high degree of integrity. Both the residence and its associated stables survive substantially intact and retain much of their original nineteenth-century character. Artefacts and memorabilia associated with the estate, ranging from saddlery to domestic furnishings, have since been preserved by local historical collections.

== Gallery ==
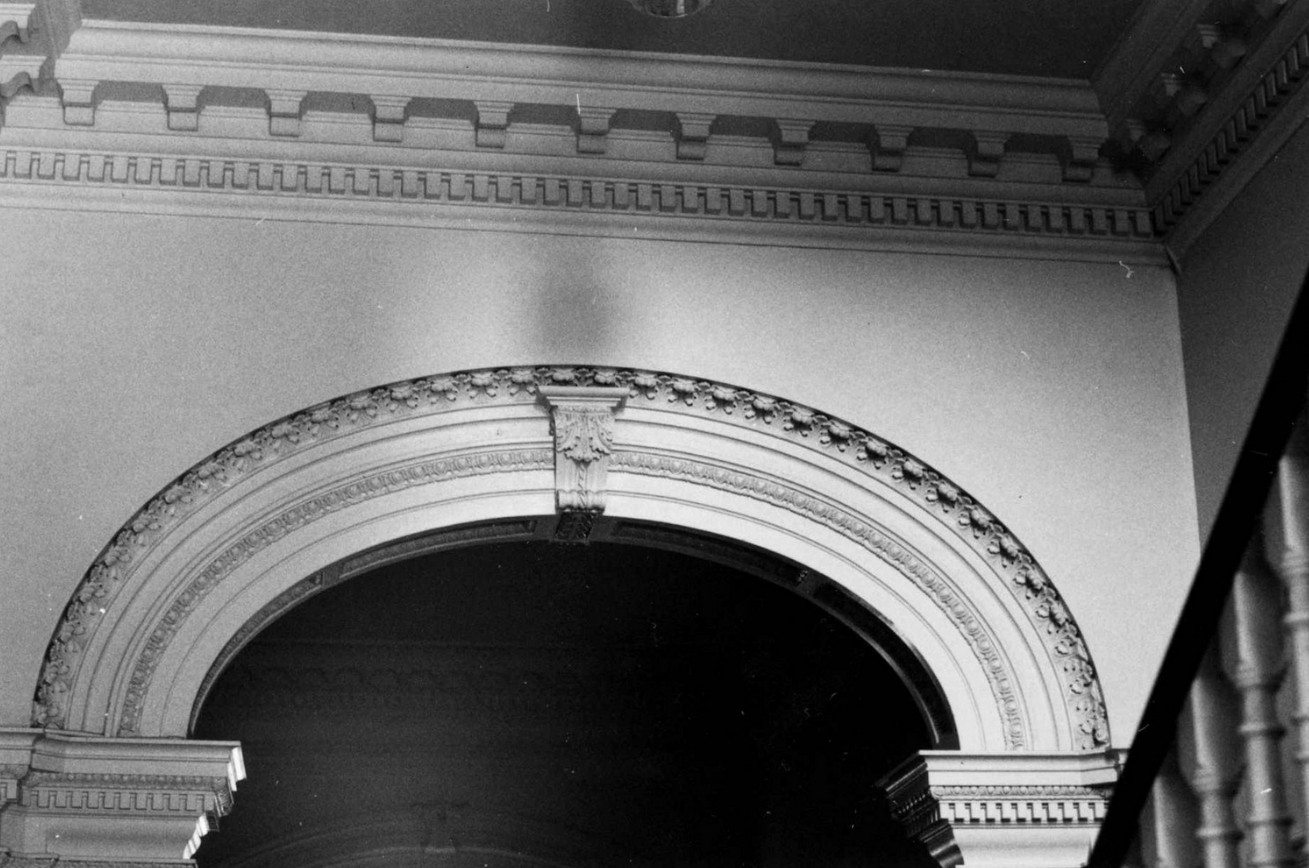
Interior archway

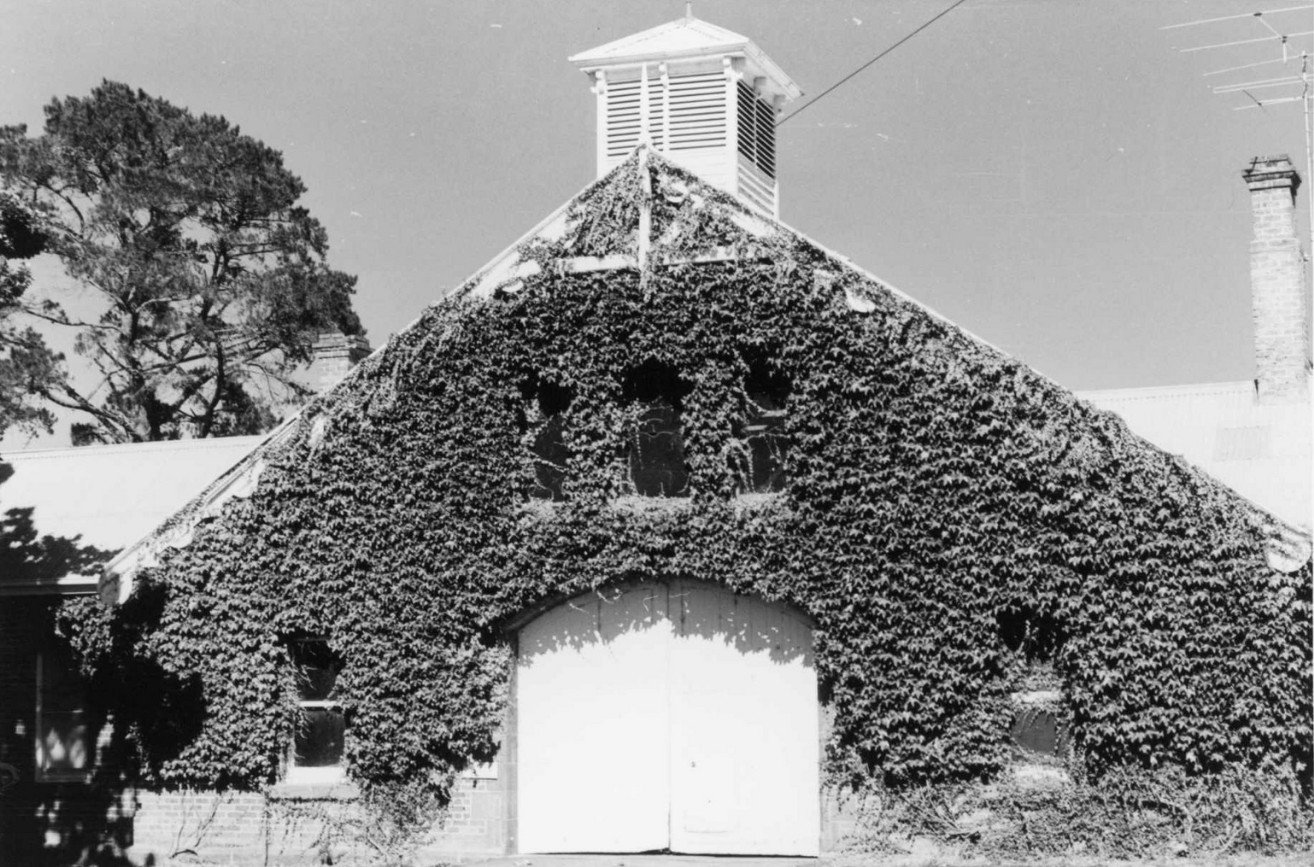
The stables

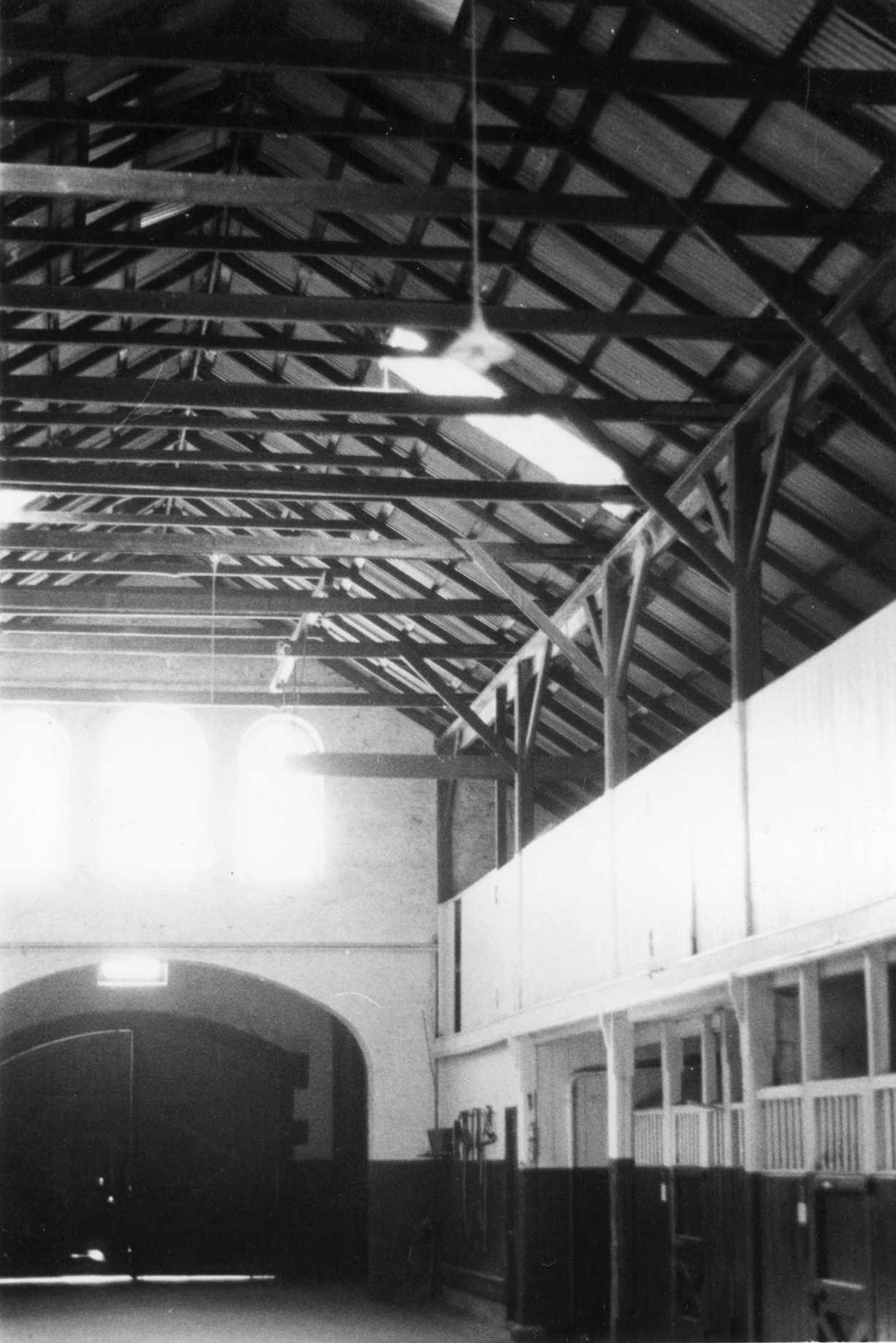
Interior of the stables

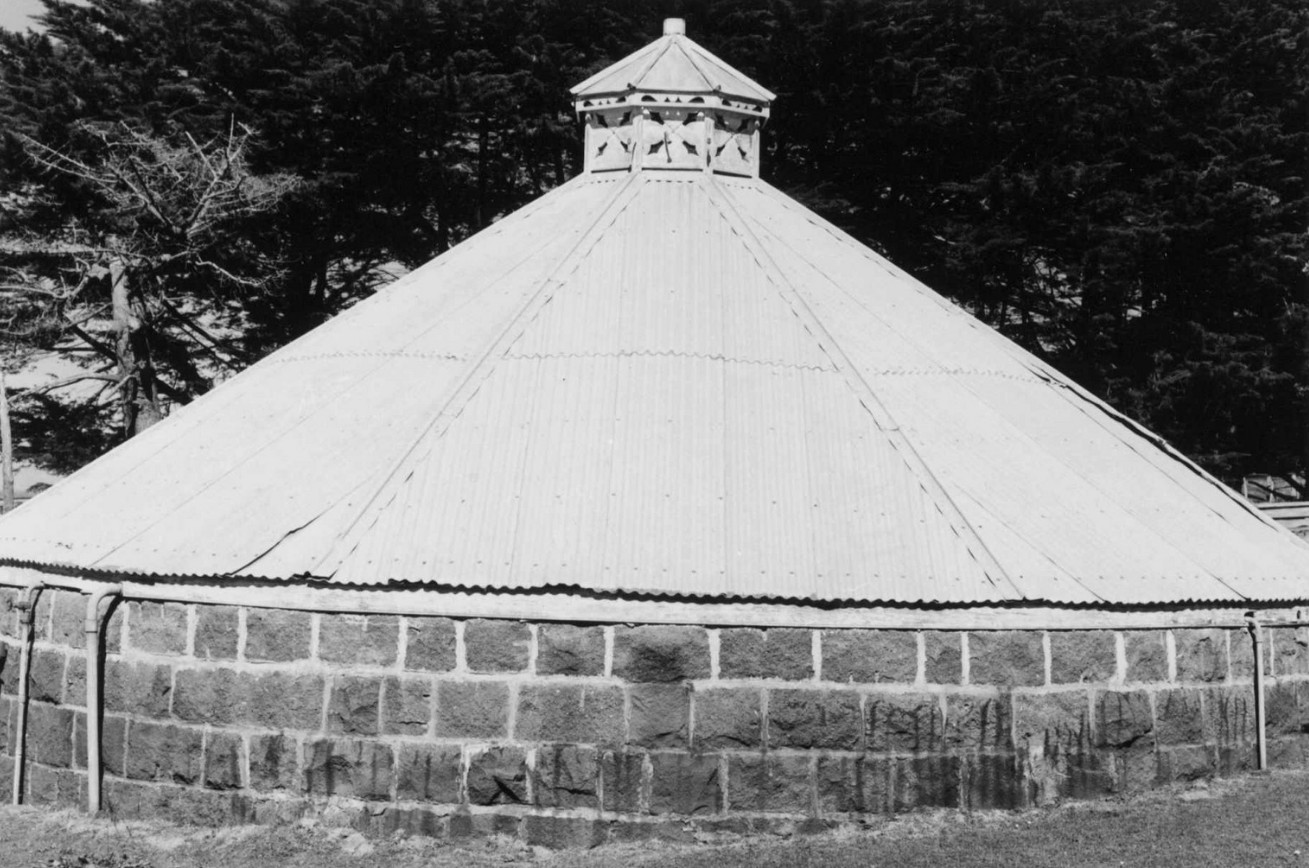
A bluestone water tank

== See also ==
- Purrumbete
- Meningoort
