= Strathcona Baptist Girls Grammar School =

Baptist girl school in Melbourne, Australia

Strathcona Girls Grammar School

Location
- Canterbury, Victoria; Australia; 37°49′47″S 145°4′48″E

Information
- Type: Independent, single-sex, Christian, day school
- Motto: Latin: Fortiter Fideliter Feliciter (Bravely, Faithfully, Happily)
- Denomination: Baptist
- Established: 1924; 102 years ago
- Founder: Mrs Florence Livingstone & Miss Henrietta Hughes
- Chairperson: Adam Stolz
- Principal: Lorna Beegan
- Chaplain: Janine de Paiva
- Gender: Female
- Enrolment: ~800 (P–12)
- Colours: Navy blue, yellow and pink
- Slogan: Girls Unstoppable
- Affiliation: Girls Sport Victoria
- Website: strathcona.vic.edu.au

Strathcona Girls Grammar School is an independent, Baptist, day school for girls, located in Canterbury, an inner-eastern suburb of Melbourne, Victoria, Australia.

Established in 1924 by Florence Livingstone and Henrietta Hughes, the school currently caters for approximately 800 students from Preparatory to Year 12 over three campuses. Year nine girls attend Tay Creggan, an historic building on the Yarra River in Hawthorn. Years 7 to 8 and 10 to 12 are located in Canterbury, and the primary school is located in a purpose-built premises near the Main Campus in Canterbury.

The school is affiliated with the Junior School Heads Association of Australia (JSHAA), the Association of Heads of Independent Schools of Australia (AHISA), the Association of Independent Schools of Victoria (AISV), the Alliance of Girls' Schools Australasia (AGSA), and is a founding member of Girls Sport Victoria (GSV).

== History ==
Strathcona was established in 1924 by its founding principals, Florence Livingstone and Henrietta Hughes, with a small number of pupils, both boys and girls.

In 1942 the school was purchased by the Baptist Union for the purpose of establishing a Baptist school for girls, and the school was renamed Strathcona Baptist Girls Grammar School.

Miss Featherstone commenced as headmistress in 1943, serving the school for 10 years. Enrolments increased rapidly and despite strict building restrictions after the Second World War, facilities were expanded providing for up to 200 girls.

=== Tay Creggan ===
In November 1969 Strathcona purchased the heritage-listed former house, Tay Creggan, that was repurposed as the school's Year 9 campus, located in Hawthorn on the banks of the Yarra River. Built in 1893 in the Queen Anne Revival style as a family home, it became an important and fashionable part of Hawthorn social life. It was designed by architect Guyon Purchas for his own use; however, he was forced to declare bankruptcy and sell the house only a few years after he commenced building it.

== Principals ==
There have been a total of nine principals (formerly headmistresses) of Strathcona since the school was established in 1924. Note, between 1924 and 1941 there were two headmistresses at the same time who were the co-founders of the school.

Years served	Name
1924–1941	Henrietta Hughes & Florence Livingstone
1941–1942	Bessie Sweetland
1943–1953	Dora Featherstone
1954–1956	Helen Smith
1957–1972	John Morley
1973–1989	Ken Lyall
1990–2000	Ruth Bunyan
2001–2014	Helen Hughes
2015–2023	Marise McConaghy
2024–Present	Lorna Beegan

== Curriculum ==
Strathcona Baptist Girls’ Grammar School offers the Victorian Certificate of Education (VCE) for their Year 11 and 12 students.

Year	Rank	Median study score	Scores of 40+ (%)	Cohort size
2012	9	37	32.9	148
2013	12	36	30.3	142
2014	20	36	23.5	168
2015	23	36	21.5	174
2016	18	36	25.8	165
2017	19	36	25.8	163
2018	22	35	24.6	159
2019	15	36	27.9	154
2020	9	36	28.2	154
2021	25	35	20.5	166
2022	15	36	25.1	171

== Sport ==
Strathcona is a member of Girls Sport Victoria (GSV) and won the GSV premiership in tennis in 2004.

== Notable alumnae ==
Alumnae of Strathcona are known as Old Strathconians and are part of the school's alumni association, the Old Strathconians' Association (OSA). Some notable Old Strathconians include:

- Jill Baker – Publisher and former newspaper editor
- Pamela Gutman – Burmese art historian, member of the Refugee Review Tribunal; deputy director of the Research Institute for Asia and the Pacific at the University of Sydney; Senior Advisor for the Foreign Affairs Department
- Margaret Anne Jackson – professor and Director, Law Discipline, School of Accounting and Law, RMIT Business, RMIT University
- Regan Lamble – Australian representative to the 2012 Olympics in Athletics and selected for the 2016 Rio Olympic Team for the 20 km Race Walk.
- Norma Redpath OBE – Sculptor
- Prudence Anne Sibree – Parliamentarian and Solicitor; Member for Kew in the Legislative Assembly in the Victorian Parliament from 1981 to 1988.
- Jo Stanley – TV and Radio personality
- Jess Wilson – Current state MP for the Kew District and opposition leader of Victoria

== See also ==
- List of schools in Victoria
- Victorian Certificate of Education
