= Tay Creggan =

Listed house in Melbourne, Australia

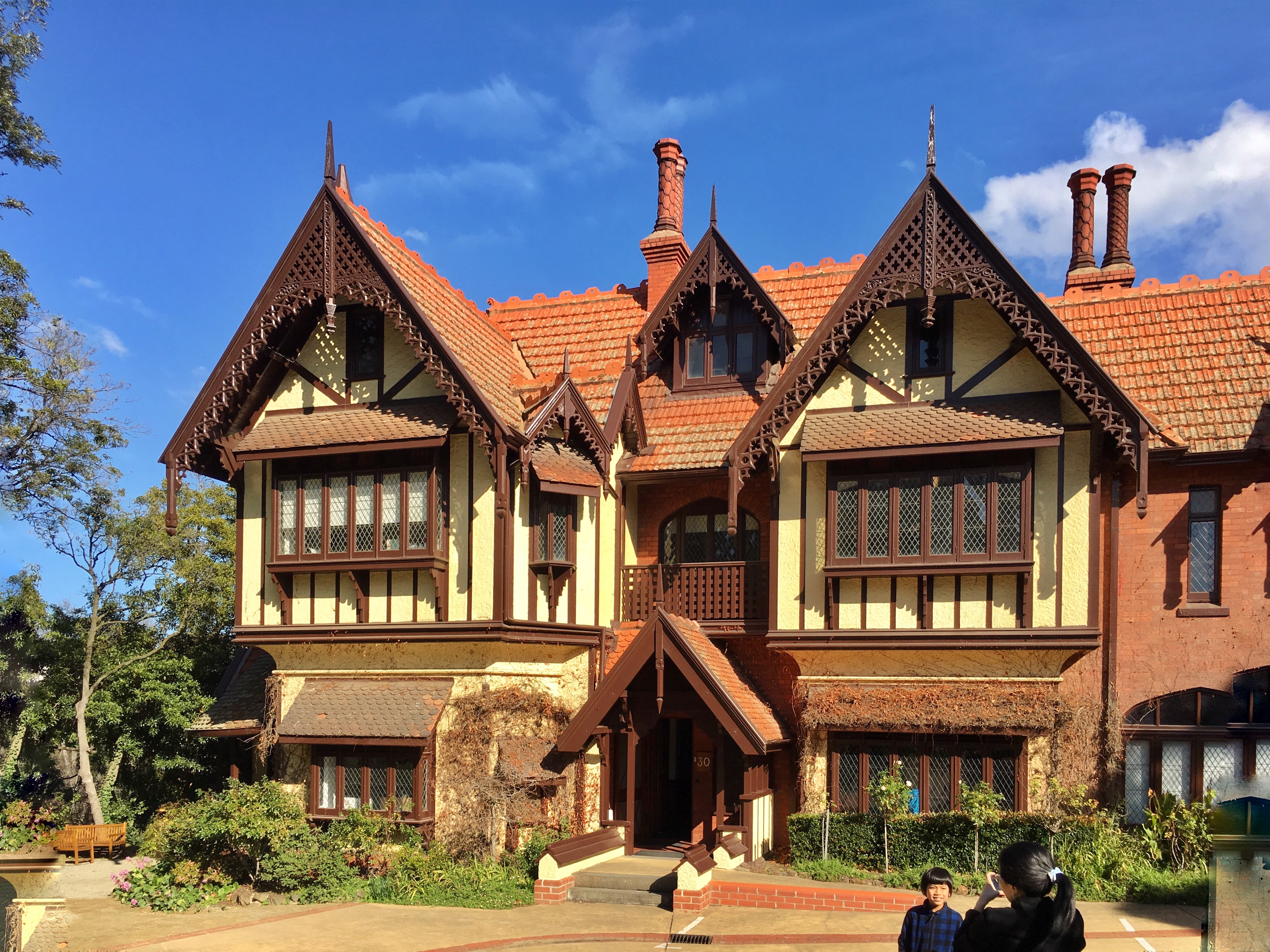
- The former house, now school campus, in 2019

- Location of the building in Greater Metropolitan Melbourne
- Etymology: Gaelic: "house built on a rock"

General information
- Status: Completed
- Type: House (1893–1969); School campus (since 1969– )
- Architectural style: Federation Queen Anne Revival
- Location: 30 Yarra Street, Hawthorn, City of Boroondara, Melbourne, Victoria, Australia
- Coordinates: 37°49′29″S 145°01′09″E
- Year built: 1891–1893
- Completed: 1893; 133 years ago
- Client: Guyon Purchas (self)
- Owner: Guyon Purchas (1889–1892); Mr and Mrs Michael Spencer (1892–1900); Mr and Mrs A. H. McKean (1901–1931); Mr William and Mrs Lydia Mortell (Note: Sometimes spelled as Mortill.) (1931–1937); Archdiocese of Melbourne (1937–1969); Strathcona Baptist Girls Grammar School (since 1969– )

Technical details
- Material: Red bricks; Marseilles tiles; timber; stained glass

Design and construction
- Architect: Guyon Purchas

Victorian Heritage Register
- Official name: Tay Creggan
- Type: Registered place
- Delisted: 11 June 2009
- Reference no.: VHR H2210
- Heritage overlay no.: HO39
- Categories: Education; Residential buildings (private)

Register of the National Estate
- Official name: Tay Creggan House and Garden
- Type: Defunct register
- Designated: 21 October 1980
- Reference no.: 5671

Tay Creggan is a former house and now independent school campus for the Strathcona Baptist Girls Grammar School, located at 30 Yarra Street in Hawthorn, in the City of Boroondara, in the inner eastern suburbs of Melbourne, in Victoria, Australia. Used as a house from 1893 until 1937, the building was used as a school boarding house until 1969, when it was repurposed as a campus for Year 9 students at Strathcona.

Built from 1891 on the traditional lands of the Wurundjeri people, the former house, now school campus, was added to the Victorian Heritage Register on 11 June 2009 in recognition of its historical and architectural significance; and was also added to non-statutory lists by the Victorian branch of the National Trust on 20 June 1961 and the now defunct Register of the National Estate on 21 October 1980.

== History ==
In 1889, Robert Guyon Whittlessey Purchas, known as Guyon Purchas, an architect, purchased 1.5 hectares (3.7 acres) on a sloping site between the railway line and the Yarra River in Hawthorn. Purchas was a prominent architect in Melbourne around the turn of the century, one of the first to be influenced by the English Arts and Crafts movement, and helped to establish the journal Arts and Crafts in 1895. Between 1891 and 1892, Purchas built Tay Creggan as his own residence; however, he ran into financial difficulties at the beginning of the 1890s depression and sold the house in 1892.

The house was bought by Michael Spencer, whose family crest appears above the fireplace in the hall. Purchas designed a number of changes to the house for Spencer, including the conversion of the ballroom to a grand billiard room. Following Spencer's death in 1900, his widow married A. H. McKean, and the house was further altered, with the enlargement of the entrance hall and new stairs constructed. During either Spencer or McKean's ownership, the house was named as Tay Creggan, meaning in Gaelic as "house built on a rock".

In 1937 the house was purchased by the Roman Catholic Church for the Ladies of the Holy Grail, who added the Tudor Hall and dormitories, now used as classrooms. It was sold to the Baptist Union of Victoria in 1969 for use by Strathcona Girls School, and was repurposed their Year 9 campus since 1970. Since then extensions and renovation works have been carried out, including the replacement of the roof tiles and the addition of a large new kitchen in place of the original.

== Description ==
Tay Creggan is a two-storey Federation Queen Anne Revival style (Note: The reported architectural style of the house varies, according to sources. Both the Victorian Heritage Register and the Register of the National Estate describe the style as "Queen Anne"; sometime as "Victorian Queen Anne" and at other time "Federation Queen Anne". The Victorian branch of the National Trust described the style of the house as "Elizabethan Revival" and "... as a mansion in the Elizabethan style beyond the wildest dreams of Richard Brown, a... pattern book architect of the 19th century.") house set amidst spacious grounds overlooking the Yarra River. Built from red brick, a characteristic picturesque effect is achieved with the asymmetry of the design and quality of the eclectic detailing. The roof of varied forms has Marseilles pattern terracotta tiles with ridging, prominent gables, turrets, decorated octagonal chimney pots and dormer windows. The turrets are clad with scallop cut tiles. The dormers and gables have finely-worked barge boards and finials. The red brick walls have rough-cast with brown woodwork on the front facade, and the windows are casements with small diamond-paned leadlights.

On the south side of the roof one of the candle-snuffer turrets has a weather vane and one gargoyle in griffin form remains. In addition the gables are heavily decorated with three dimensional open fretwork and carved finials and pendants to the bargeboards. The fenestration is in banks of narrow casements with diagonal leadlighting. There is a small timber porch with steeply pitched roof over the front entrance. The gable walls exhibit strapwork half timbering with cream painted roughcast finish. The picturesque effect is enhanced by extensive creeper cover.

The interior originally had sixteen rooms. There is a fine carved kauri staircase, perhaps dating from alterations in 1901, leading to an upper landing with a stained glass window by William Montgomery depicting a hunting scene, with contrasting art nouveau decoration above. Many rooms have interesting timbered ceilings, fireplaces, and bay windows. The most outstanding room is the former ballroom – or billiard room – which has three stained glass ceiling domes which provide diffuse illumination and an enormous Scottish Oak fireplace with an Art Nouveau-style decorative dragon motif. There are several former servants' rooms in the attic.

The rear, south side, of the house has been extended as additional accommodation, resulting in the demolition of the original brick paved stable yard, coach house and stables. Some verandahs have been filled in. However additions have been sympathetic to the original design of the house and are well defined. The oldest addition is in a lighter brick and has leadlight windows. A modern hall running north–south at the rear of the house is also sympathetically designed.

=== Gardens ===
Tay Creggan is set in an established and complementary landscaped garden, set back from Yarra Street, near the railway line and overlooking the Yarra River. The house is set up on an embankment forming a podium for the house. The grounds are entered from Yarra Street by a wide gravel carriage drive flanked by established garden beds leading to the front porch and a turning area. Narrow garden beds surround the house. In front of the house on the south side of the path is an extensive embankment with landings and stairs leading down to the land at a lower level along the Yarra. The line of the 1891 flood runs along the base of this embankment and it is presumed that any detailed garden areas were limited to above this line with the area below consisting of open grassland flanked by trees. A row of Bhutan Cypress trees identifies the eastern boundary and mature elms line the Yarra River.

Although the garden has been diminished in size and the western portion with the glasshouse and stables is now covered with buildings of a more recent era, sufficient garden survives to appreciate its nineteenth century characteristics. The garden is significant in its own right as a well preserved example of a typical nineteenth century picturesque garden; extant attributes include the carriage drive, the entrance gates and gate posts, the extensive embankment separating the garden from the river flats, steps and landings, tennis court (although now re-oriented on an east–west axis), mature trees, terraced garden beds and shrubberies.

== See also ==
- Architecture of Melbourne
- List of places on the Victorian Heritage Register in the City of Boroondara
