= Albert Purchas =

- Born: 1825; Chepstow, Monmouthshire, Wales
- Died: 26 September 1909 (aged 83–84); Kew, Victoria
- Occupation: Architect
- Buildings: Glenara Homestead, Bulla; St George's Presbyterian Church, East St Kilda

Albert Purchas (1825 – 1909) was a prominent 19th century architect and surveyor in Melbourne, Australia.

== Early life ==
Albert Purchas was born in Chepstow, Monmouthshire, Wales in 1825, the son of Robert Whittlesey Purchas and Marianne Guyon. He was the brother of Arthur Guyon Purchas.

He emigrated to Melbourne in 1851, and soon established a private practice as a surveyor and architect.

On 1 Nov 1854 in St Kilda, he married Eliza Anne Swyer (c1825–1869), the eldest daughter of Robert Swyer, of Kersal, Lancashire.

Albert and Eliza had a large family, with 10 children, although several died young. Their children included Marian Eliza Purchas (c1855-c1875), Claude Albert Guyon Purchas (c1857), Robert Guyon Whittlesey (6 September 1862 – 4 June 1940), Edith Matilda (c1859-1885), Violet (c1860-c1875), Beatrice Purchas (c1864), Lillian Purchas (c1864), Ethel Annie (c1865-c1938); Adeline (c1867), Elaine Alberta (c1868-c1891).

== Architectural practice ==
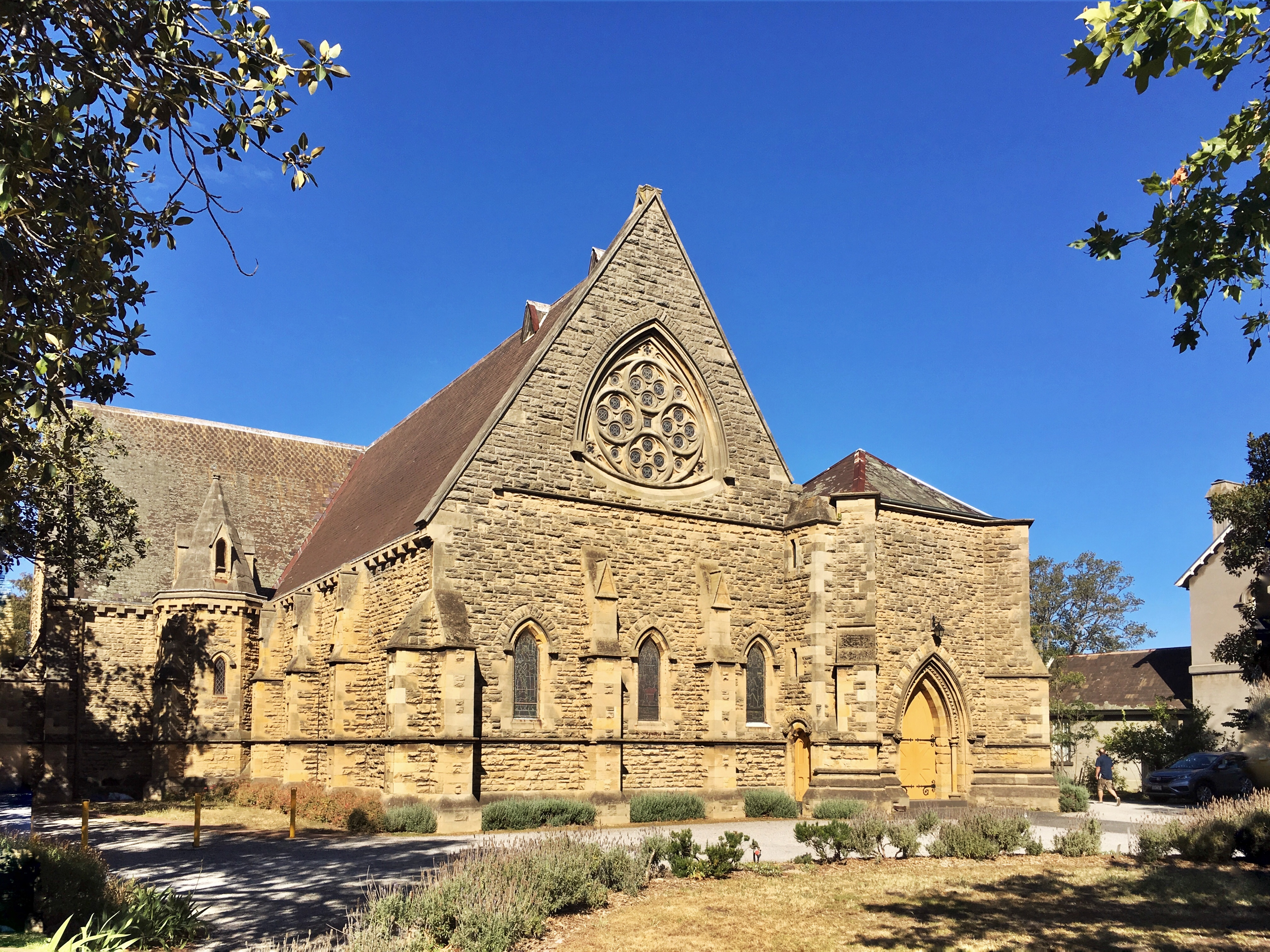
Christ Church St Kilda 1853-7

Purchas was soon joined his brother-in law Charles R Swyer in the partnership of Purchas & Swyer, which lasted from 1856 to 1862, after which he again practiced alone up to about 1891. Purchas had his offices at 81 Little Collins; and later 30 Queens Street, 81 Chancery Lane and finally 462 Little Collins Street.

Alone or with Swyer, Purchas is said to have designed over 140 houses, offices, churches, banks and cemetery buildings in Victoria in his long career. Berkely Hall St Kilda dating from 1854 is one of his first buildings, and still exists, though the original house is obscured by an early 20thC verandah. Another notable early design was the head office of the Melbourne Savings Bank, built on the corner Flinders Lane and Market Street in 1857–58, in an elaborately detailed Renaissance Revival style.

His churches were mostly Gothic Revival, built for the Anglican Church, along with some parsonages, while most of the bank buildings were Renaissance Revival designs for the Bank of Australasia. He also designed city buildings in the 1860s and 70s, such as the Mutual Insurance Co, Northern Insurance Co, and the first premises for George & George, destroyed by fire in 1889.

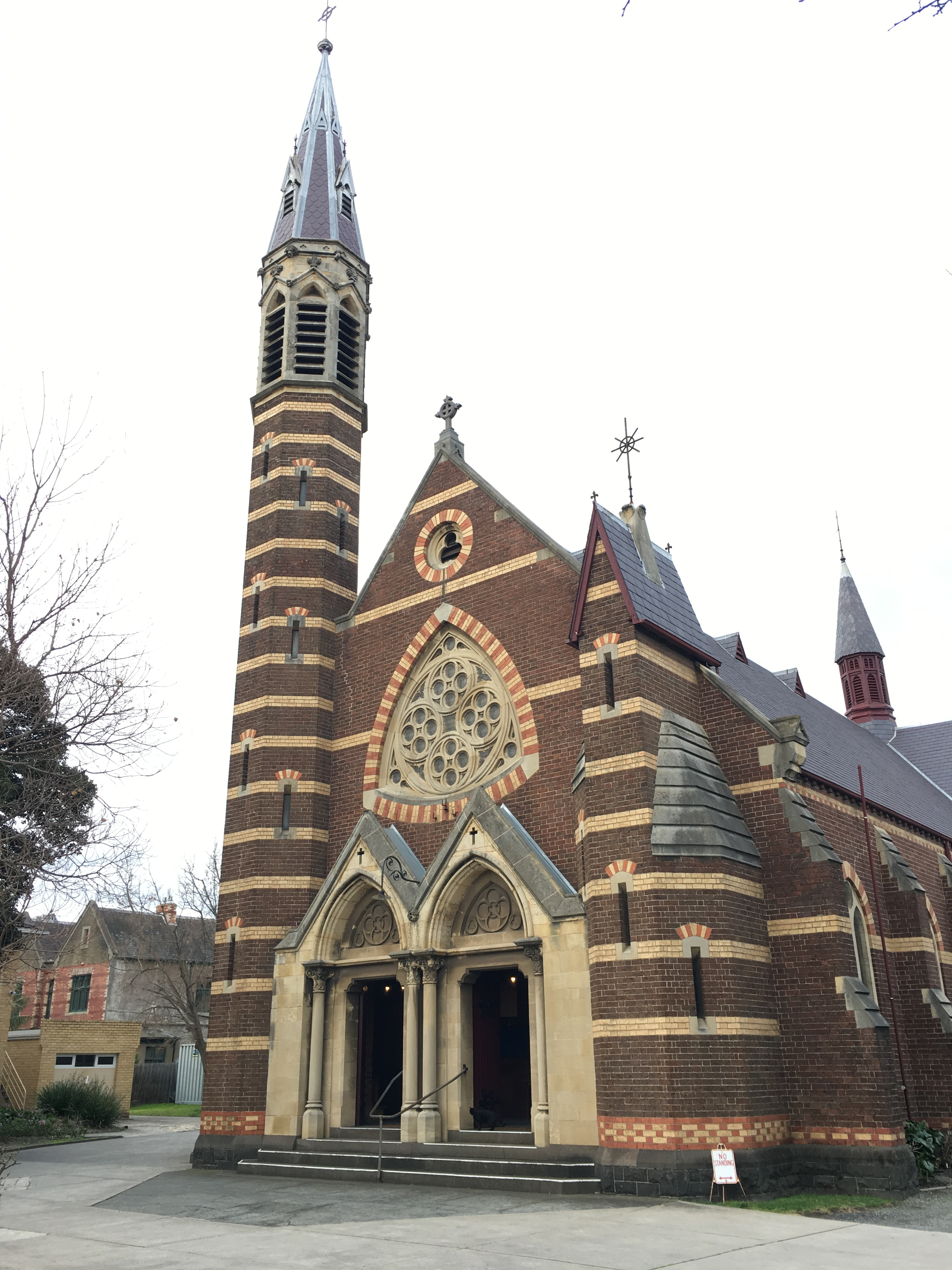
St Georges, East St Kilda, 1877-80

One of his most outstanding designs is St George's Presbyterian Church in Chapel Street, St Kilda (1877–80), in a striking polychrome brick Gothic Revival style, unusually carried on through to the interior.

Several Australian architects obtained experience working in Purchas's office, including South Australian architect Edward Davies (1852–1927), while another pupil, William Black, became a senior partner in the well-known Cape Town, South Africa partnership of Black & Fagg. During his pupilage to Purchas, Black won several prizes offered by the RVIA, among them the Royal Victoria Institute of Architects' award in December 1885.

== Other activities ==
Purchas produced one of the few published maps and compilations of the early pastoral settlers runs in Victoria in 1853

In the same year he designed the layout of the Melbourne General Cemetery, the first 'garden' cemetery in Victoria, a curvilinear layout with extensive plantings, as well as the gate lodge and gates (the gates lodge were demolished and the gates relocated to their present position in the 1930s). He was a long time member of the Cemetery Trust, serving as secretary from 1876 to 1886. He was also Chairman of the Boroondara General Cemetery Board of Trustees 1867 to 1909, and designed many aspects of the cemetery, including the landscape, the cast iron entrance gates (1889), the rotunda (1890) and the surrounding brick wall (1895–6). He was also involved with the philanthropic Old Colonists Homes in North Fitzroy, arranging the fencing in 1870.

He was vice president of the Royal Victorian Institute of Architects for many years, and President in 1887–8.

He also was a subscriber to the Philosophical Society of Victoria in 1855, and a member of the Philosophical Institute of Victoria 1857–8.

Purchas was a keen inventor having applied for a patent for an invention for lighting a railway carriage with gas in 1861, and won a competition for a model farm complex, in 1862. This unusual design had the dairy either underground or half underground, to keep it cool, with a 'dry lining' around the outside of the sunken portions. In 1883, with fellow architect Alfred Smith, he took out a patent for fire-proof floors, arches, staircases and other parts of buildings.

== Selected works ==
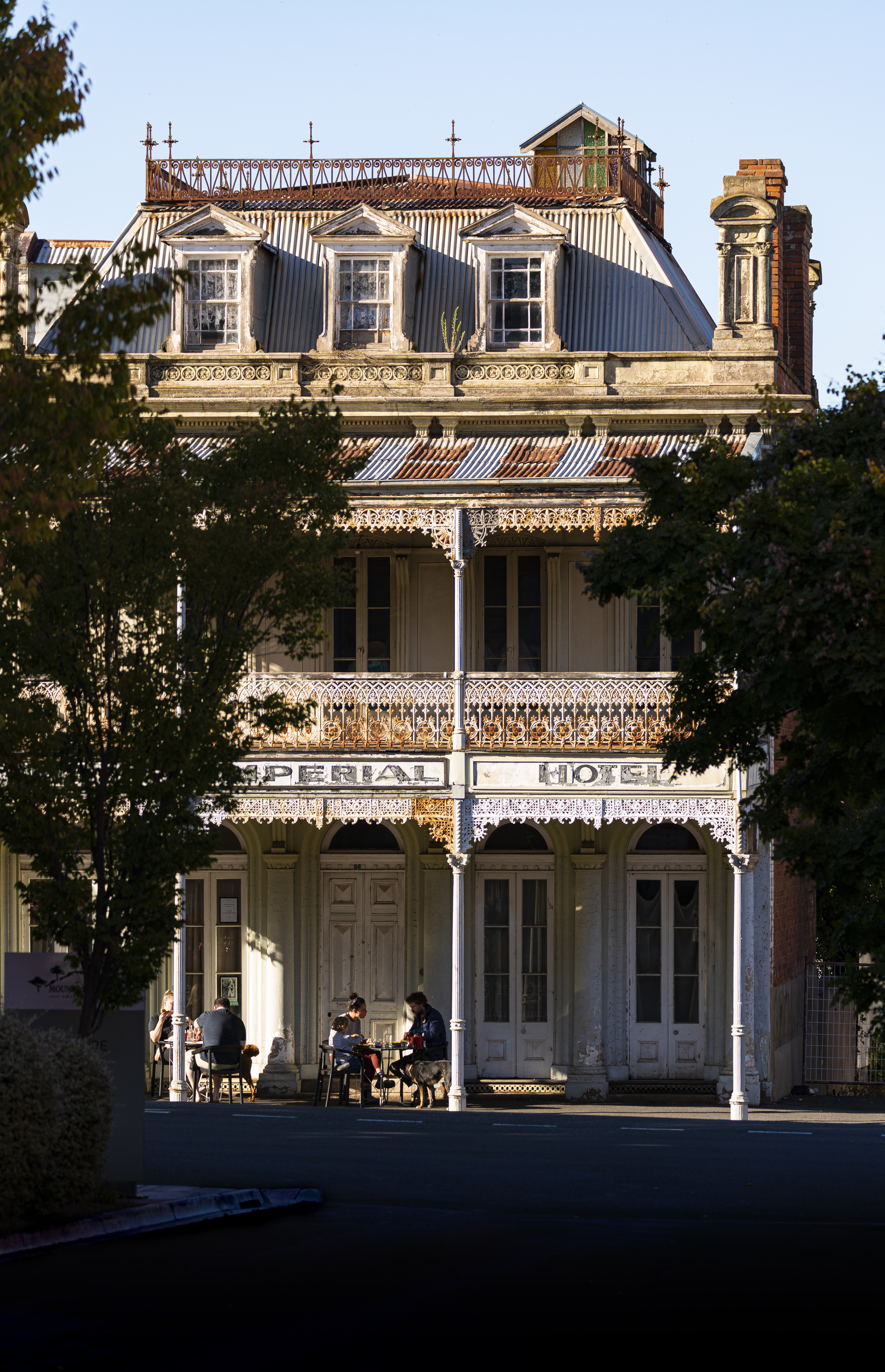
The 1861 Beck's Imperial Hotel, Castlemaine

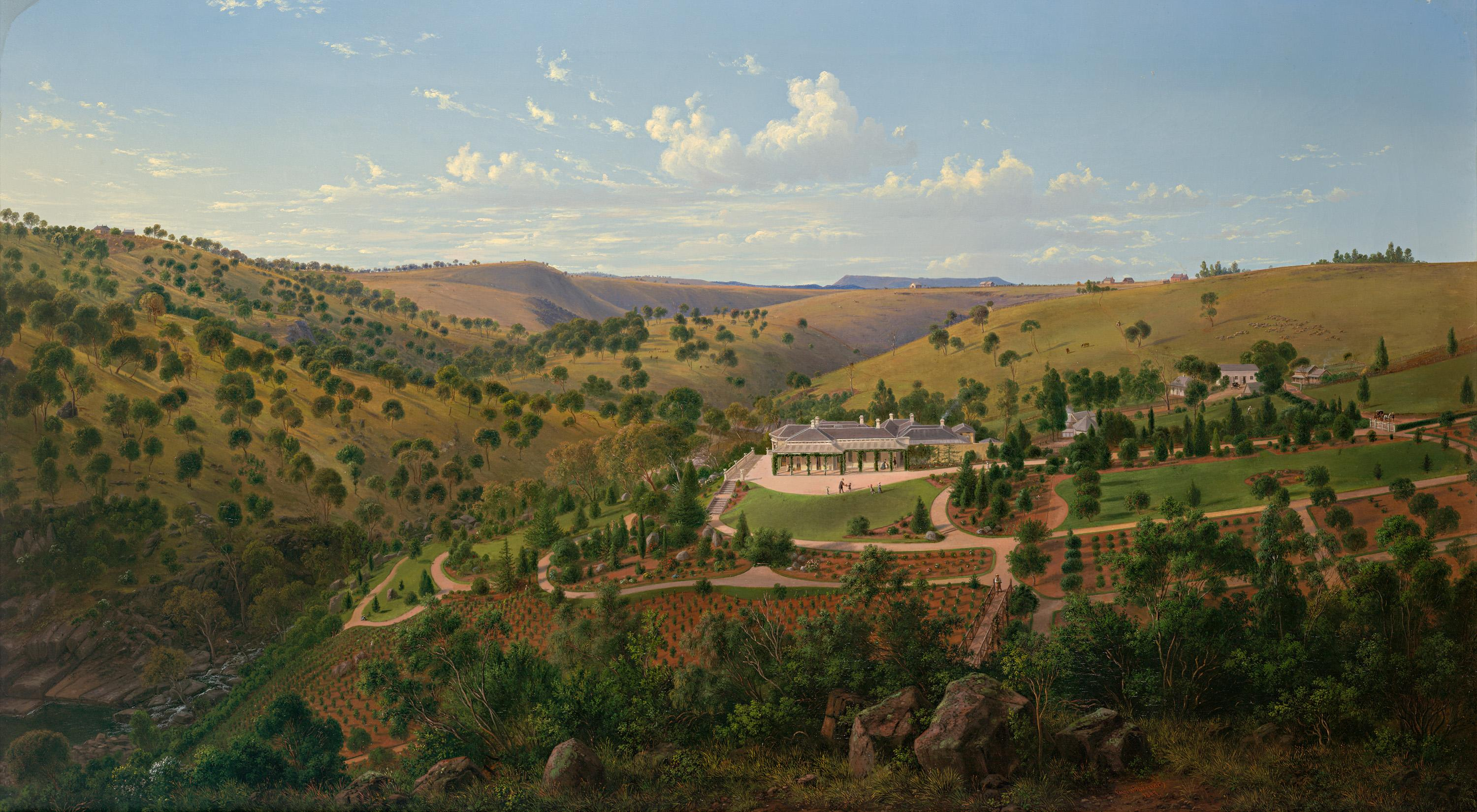
Eugene von Guérard, Mr Clark's Station ('Glenara'), Deep Creek, near Keilor, 1867, National Gallery of Victoria, Melbourne.

The Miles Lewis Architectural Index has 218 entries for Albert Purchas, and more for Purchas & Swyer. Notable works amongst this prolific output include:

- Hawthorn Village Plan, 1851
- Melbourne General Cemetery layout, gate lodge and gates, Carlton, 1853.
- Berkeley Hall, 11 Princes Street, St Kilda, 1854 (original house hidden by early 20thC verandah)
- Christ Church Anglican Church (nave only), Brunswick, 1857
- Christ Church (nave and transepts), St Kilda, 1854-7
- Temple Court, Collins Street frontage, 1857
- Glenara Homestead, Bulla, 1857
- Melbourne Savings Bank, corner Flinders Lane and Market Street, Melbourne, 1857-58 (demolished c1928)
- Bank of Australasia, 2 Malop Street Geelong, 1859-60 (interiors intact but exterior refaced)
- Beck's Imperial Hotel, Lyttleton St, Castlemaine, 1861 (verandah is later)
- St John's, Malmsbury, Victoria, 1861-66
- Melbourne Meat Preserving Company Buildings, Van Ness Avenue, Maribyrnong, c1868
- Corsewall, Hawthorn, before 1875 (demolished)
- St George's Presbyterian Church, East St Kilda, 1877-1880
- Barristers' Chambers, Bourke Street through to Little Collins Street near William Street, 1882 (demolished c1969)
- National Bank of Australasia, 261 Victoria Street Abbotsford, 1887
- St Hilary's Church of England, John and Rowland Streets Kew, 1888(demolished)
- The United Service Home (Crimea Veterans Home), 1 Crimea Street, Drysdale, 1891

== Later life ==
In 1878, Purchas was one of several architects who protested the choice of an overseas architect for the design of the Melbourne Anglican Cathedral, pointing out the expertise in the profession in Victoria and the need for someone aware of local conditions. He also sat on the examining committees of the Victorian Architects Institute and selected annual student prizewinners.

In 1883 he purchased the Isle of Wight Hotel on Philip Island from John Richardson, possibly as a retirement interest or investment.

In the early 1880s his son, Robert Guyon Whittlesey Purchas was articled in his office, who went on to become a prominent architect himself, championing the Arts & Crafts in the 1890s-1900s.

In 1896, when he was in his early 70s, he made the news, having been summonsed for taking offense when a railway employee asking to see his ticket, and attacking him with his cane.

Purchas died in his home in Kew in 1909 and was buried at Boroondara Cemetery. He left an estate of the value of £5,878.
