= Pamela Gutman =

Australian art historian and researcher (1944–2015)

- Born: Pamela Christine Munson; 19 September 1944; Adelaide, Australia
- Died: 31 March 2015 (aged 70)
- Occupations: Art historian; researcher
- Spouse: Gerry Gutman

Academic background
- Education: University of Vienna; Australian National University
- Thesis: Ancient Arakan: with special reference to its cultural history between the fifth and 11th centuries (1977)
- Influences: Gordon Luce

Academic work
- Discipline: Burmese art and Burmese history
- Notable works: Burma’s Lost Kingdoms- Splendours of Arakan

Pamela Gutman (1944 – 31 March 2015) was an Australian researcher, art historian, and civil servant. Specialised in ancient Burmese art, she was considered an authority in the domain.

== Early life and education ==
Gutman was born Pamela Christine Munson in Adelaide, Australia on 19 September 1944, the eldest of three daughters to Helmut Mundstein (later Munson), an architect and quantity surveyor, and Olga Mundstein (née Watmuff), a bookkeeper. In 1955, the family moved to Melbourne, where she studied at the Strathcona Baptist Girls Grammar School.

She completed her tertiary education at the University of Vienna, focusing on German, philosophy, and art history. She married Gerry Gutman, a public servant and economist, in 1968.

She pursued a doctorate at the Australian National University, becoming the first Australian scholar to complete a doctorate in Asian art. In 1972, she began field research in Burma (now Myanmar) for her PhD thesis, Ancient Arakan, with Special Reference to Its Cultural History, 5th to 12th Centuries, completed in 1977.

== Career ==
Gutman entered public and university service after completing her education, working for the Australian Department of Immigration and the Department of the Prime Minister and Cabinet. From 1997 to 2004, she served as a member of the Refugee Review Tribunal.

In 2001, she published Burma’s Lost Kingdoms: Splendours of Arakan, which is now a key reference for scholars of Rakhine State.

Throughout her career, she advised many galleries, including the National Gallery of Australia, Art Gallery of New South Wales, Hermitage Museum in Saint Petersburg, and Asia Society in New York.

== Death ==
Gutman died on 31 March 2015 from cancer. She was survived by her daughter, three grandchildren, and two sisters. At the time of her death, she had not yet completed a planned second edition of Burma’s Lost Kingdoms: Splendours of Arakan, and a biography of Gordon Luce, a British scholar of Burmese history.

== Publications ==
- Burma's Lost Kingdoms: Splendours of Arakan (2001)
