= Wiridgil =

Historic homestead in Victoria, Australia

- Wiridgil Homestead

- Location in Corangamite Shire, Victoria
- 38°13′53″S 143°13′13″E
- Type: Homestead, associated built facilities and grounds
- Location: Weerite, Victoria, Australia
- Nearest city: Colac

History
- Built: ~1895 (present homestead)
- Built for: Edward Manifold

Site notes
- Architect: Alexander Hamilton
- Architectural style: Victorian

Wiridgil is a historic pastoral property and homestead complex at Weerite, immediately outside of Camperdown, in the Western District of Victoria, Australia. Originally an outstation of the Purrumbete estate during the nineteenth century, the property was of one several properties in the region owned by the Manifold family. The homestead was designed by architect Alexander Hamilton and later enlarged by Guyon Purchas in 1907. Wiridgil was historically used for sheep and cattle grazing and dairying, and has remained in the Manifold family to the present day.

== History ==
Wiridgil was originally an outstation of the extensive Purrumbete pastoral estate, which had been established by the Manifold family outside of Camperdown during the 1840s. Following the division of Purrumbete among the sons of pastoralist John Manifold, Wiridgil became the holding of Thomas Peter Manifold, while his younger brother Edward received another portion of the estate known as Danedite. Thomas Peter Manifold was educated at Geelong Grammar School and Trinity Hall, Cambridge, and alongside managing Wiridgil, was a prominent participant in equestrian sports.

In 1894, Lord Hopetoun, then Governor of Victoria, and Lady Hopetoun stayed at Wiridgil during a visit to the Western District.

On 19 July 1895, Thomas Peter Manifold was fatally injured while participating in a hunt near Melton. During the event, his horse, a steeplechaser named Postscript, fell while negotiating an obstacle, throwing him to the ground and landing on him. Manifold sustained severe internal injuries and died later that evening. He was unmarried and around 30 years old. His death resulted in Wiridgil passing to his younger brother Edward Manifold, who then made the property his principal residence.

Thomas Peter Manifold

Edward Manifold

Soon after Edward Manifold's acquisition of the property, a substantial bluestone residence and associated stables were constructed, designed by architect Alexander Hamilton. The main building was constructed from rough-faced bluestone, with dressed stonework at the corners, and featured projecting wings, bay windows and surrounding verandahs. The complex also included weatherboard stables designed to accommodate the horses used for the estate's pastoral operations and the family's equestrian activities. In 1907, architect Guyon Purchas designed an extension to the western side of the residence.

On 10 March 1900, a grass fire broke out at Wiridgil and spread rapidly across the property. Initially advancing towards the homestead under the influence of the prevailing wind, the fire threatened to cause extensive damage to the surrounding buildings and agricultural land, but a change in wind direction diverted the flames eastwards, reducing the immediate danger to the residence.

The coach house and stables

Edward Manifold married Beatrice Mary Synnot Anderson in July 1900, and the couple raised three sons. Under Edward's management, Wiridgil developed as a mixed pastoral and agricultural estate. By 1909, the property encompassed around 6,000 acres (2,400 ha), divided equally between land leased for dairying and land retained for grazing. The dairy portion consisted of farms averaging 300 acres (120 ha), occupied by tenant farmers. The remaining land supported crossbred sheep and cattle, taking advantage of the fertile volcanic soils of the district.

Edward Manifold maintained merino and Lincoln sheep, together with Shorthorn cattle, across his pastoral holdings. In addition to his agricultural interests, Manifold was active in local government, serving on the Shire of Hampden council from 1909 until 1931 and holding the position of shire president on three occasions. He was also involved in horse racing and held membership of the Victoria Racing Club committee.

In December 1908, Wiridgil hosted Lord Dudley, then Governor-General of Australia, during a visit to the Camperdown district. Lord Dudley arrived from Colac by government motor car on the evening of 9 December and stayed as a guest of Edward and Beatrice Manifold. The following day, he visited Camperdown to inspect local units of the Australian Light Horse, together with mounted and school cadets.

In March 1925, Wiridgil received another vice-regal visitor when Lord Forster, the Governor-General of Australia, and Lady Forster stayed as guests of Edward Manifold. During their visit, Lord and Lady Forster attended an official welcome organised by the Hampden Shire Council on 27 March.

The dog cemetery on the property

Edward Manifold remained at Wiridgil until his death on 14 February 1931, following an operation. His estate was valued for probate at nearly £500,000.

In January 1939, a fire caused considerable damage at Wiridgil, destroying three cottages and two motor cars. The flames also threatened the main homestead and neighbouring properties before being brought under control.

On 5 March 1949, a large garden party was held at Wiridgil, then the residence of Robert Manifold and his wife. The event was organised to raise funds for the Victoria Missions to Seamen and collected £67.

In 1957, a tower and spire were erected at St Paul's Anglican Church, Camperdown in memory of Edward and Beatrice Manifold, with the work funded by their sons Peter, Andrew and Robert.

Wiridgil presently remains in the Manifold family, Marion Manifold being the latest resident.

== See also ==
- Talindert
- Purrumbete
- Camperdown
