= Purrumbete =

Historic homestead in Victoria, Australia

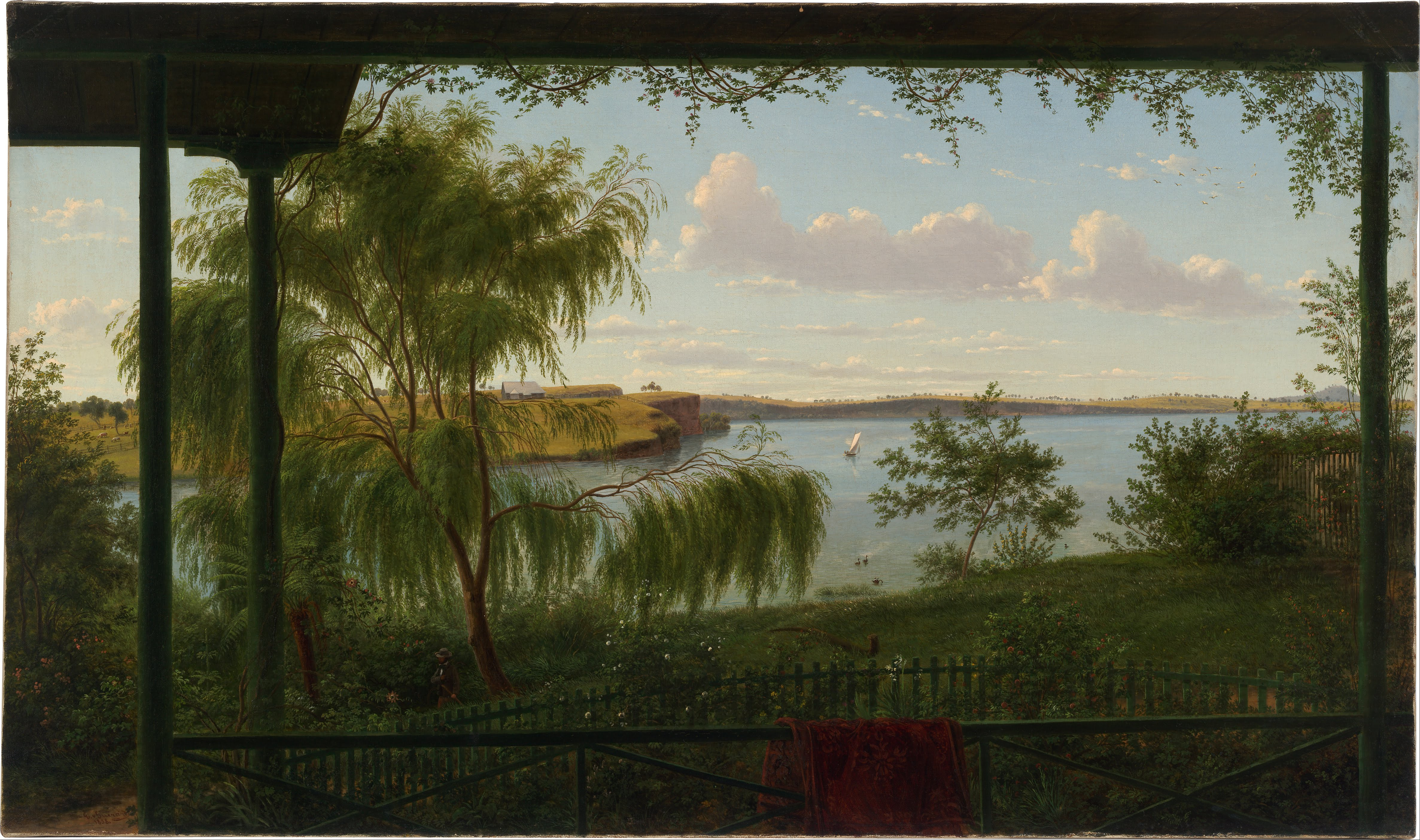
- From the verandah of Purrumbete, by Eugene von Guerard (1858)

- Location in Corangamite Shire, Victoria
- 38°16′11″S 143°13′29″E
- Type: Homestead, associated built facilities and grounds
- Location: Weerite, Victoria, Australia
- Nearest city: Colac

History
- Built: 1901
- Built for: William Thomas Manifold

Site notes
- Architect: Guyon Purchas
- Architectural style: Federation

Purrumbete is a heritage-listed pastoral homestead and estate on the northern shore of Lake Purrumbete near Camperdown, Victoria, Australia. Established in 1838 by the Manifold brothers, it is one of Victoria's oldest continuously occupied pastoral properties and the earliest established pastoral run in the Shire of Corangamite. Occupied by successive generations of the Manifold family for almost 150 years, the estate played an important role in the pastoral and agricultural development of Victoria's Western District. The present homestead is the result of several phases of construction and enlargement, culminating in extensive Federation Arts and Crafts alterations designed by architect Guyon Purchas in 1901. The property is also noted for its intact pastoral complex, extensive gardens, and a series of murals by Walter Withers depicting the early history of the Manifold family.

== History ==
The origins of Purrumbete are closely associated with the Manifold family, who emigrated from Chester, England, to Van Diemen's Land in 1831. Brothers Peter and John Manifold travelled with their parents, William and Mary, and three sisters to join their elder brother Thomas Manifold, who had settled on the Tamar River two years earlier. In 1836 the three brothers crossed Bass Strait to explore the Port Phillip District, landing sheep at Point Henry near Geelong before establishing themselves at Batesford on the Moorabool River.

In 1838 John and Peter Manifold, accompanied by their brother-in-law Marcus Symons, travelled west in search of new grazing country. After climbing Mount Porndon, they discovered the large freshwater lake now known as Lake Purrumbete. Peter late wrote that the surrounding country possessed "the richest description" of soil, comparing it favourably with agricultural land in England. Encouraged by its potential, the brothers returned to Batesford, gathered their stock and permanently occupied the district, establishing the pastoral run of Purrumbete in December 1838. The run ultimately extended across approximately 100,000 acres (40,470 ha) surrounding the lake.

The brothers first erected a slab hut on the northern shore of the lake before replacing it in 1842 with a more substantial bluestone and weatherboard residence. The second house occupied the site of the present homestead, chosen because it was protected on three sides by the waters of Lake Purrumbete. Over subsequent decades this early building was enlarged and incorporated into later additions.

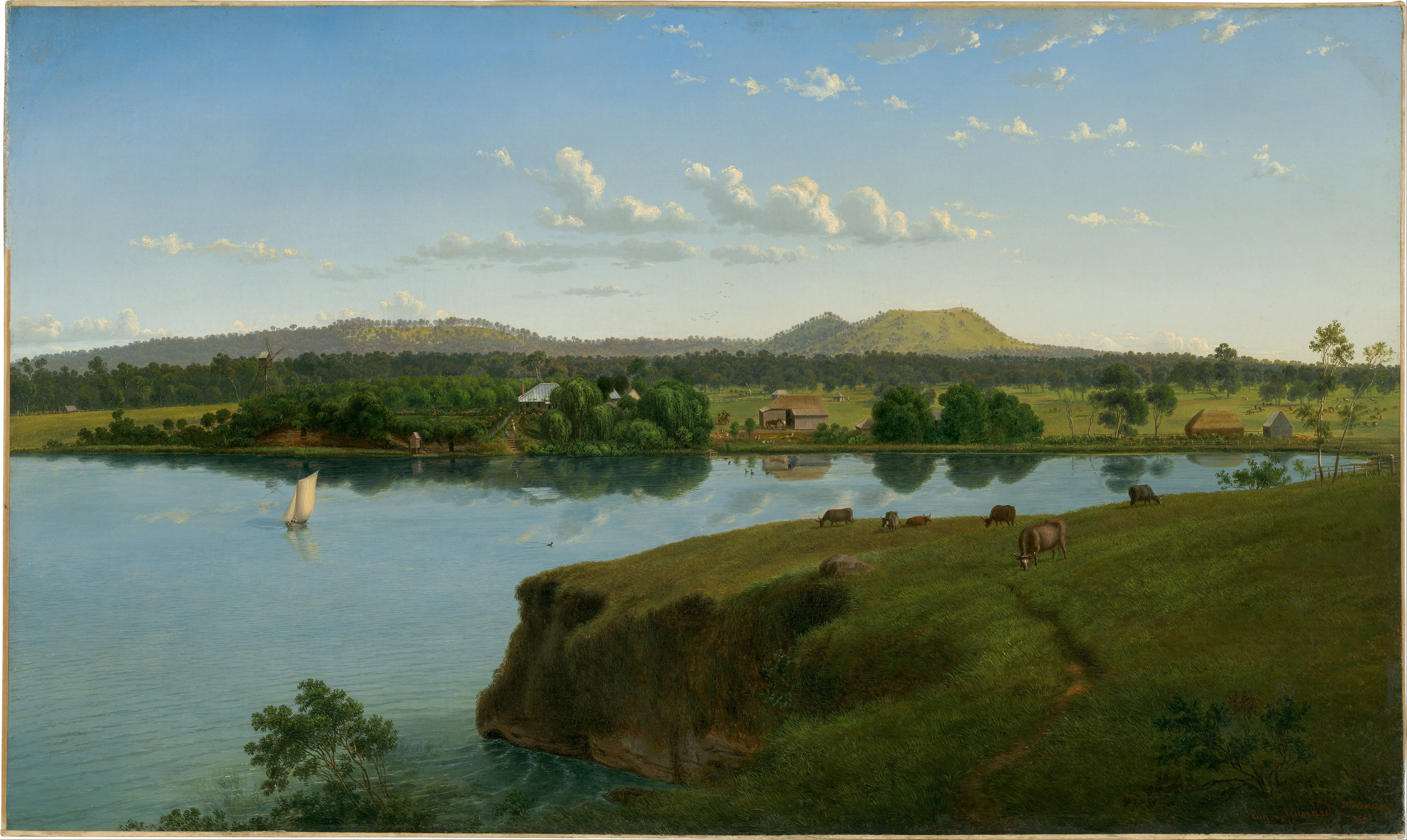
Purrumbete from across the lake, by Eugene von Guerard (1858)

Thomas Manifold joined his brothers at Purrumbete with his wife Jane in the early 1840s before establishing his own pastoral property at Grassmere near Warrnambool in 1844. During the station's formative years the Manifolds applied pastoral knowledge gained in Van Diemen's Land to the management of the run. Early visitor William Adeney described station life at Purrumbete in his 1841 diary, providing one of the earliest accounts of life on a Western District pastoral run.

Although Purrumbete was initially stocked with sheep, the fertile volcanic soils proved especially well suited to cattle. The Manifolds gradually developed a Shorthorn herd, purchasing foundation stock from the Bolden brothers near Warrnambool and retaining the distinctive "3M" brand. Their transition to cattle coincided with the Victorian gold rush, creating a substantial market for beef. By 1851 the brothers were breeding more than 1,000 cattle annually in addition to fattening store stock, and by the late 1850s they were running between 8,000 and 10,000 head of cattle. Throughout this period the station also employed local Aboriginal people.

Like many early pastoralists, the Manifolds contended with significant challenges including sheep scab, liver fluke, footrot, rabbits, bushfires and pleuro-pneumonia. Despite these setbacks the station prospered, and during the 1850s the family's pastoral licenses were progressively converted into freehold land. John Manifold married Marion Thomson in Van Diemen's Land in 1856, and together they had 10 children. John died in 1877, followed by his brother Peter in 1885, bringing to an end the founding generation of the Purrumbete estate.

Following Peter's death, the Manifold holdings were divided among members of the next generation. William Thomson Manifold inherited Purrumebte, comprising approximately 10,809 acres (4,374 ha), while his brothers received the neighbouring estates of Talindert, Wiridgil and Danedite. Members of the family became well known not only as pastoralists but also for their philanthropy and support of tenant farmers, many of whom were eventually able to purchase their own holdings. The family's prominence is commemorated in Camperdown through Manifold Street and a public statue of James Chester Manifold.

The homestead continued to evolve during the late nineteenth and early twentieth centuries. The original house was expanded during the 1850s and again the late 1870s before a substantial extension designed by architect Alexander Hamilton was undertaken in 1882. In 1901 William Thomson Manifold commissioned architect Guyon Purchas to comprehensively remodel and enlarge the residence. Purchas transformed the building into an outstanding example of Federation Arts and Crafts domestic architecture incorporating extensive Art Nouveau detailing, including carved timberwork executed by Robert Prensel. The enlarged house contained ten bedrooms, ten bathrooms, numerous reception rooms and a large entrance hall featuring a minstrels' gallery, with interiors distinguished by elaborate timber pannelling, carved overmantels and inglenook seating.

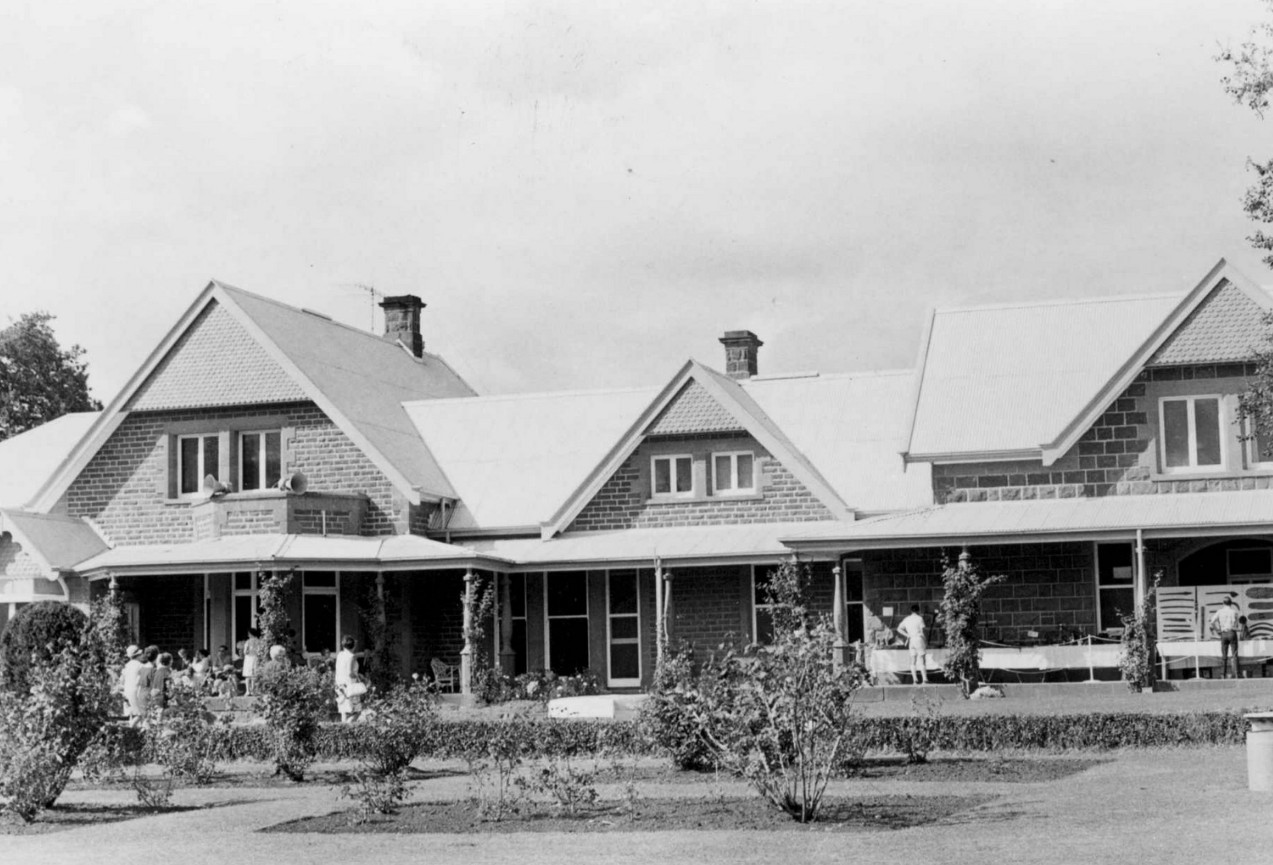
Purrumbete Homestead

In 1902, Heidelberg School painter Walter Withers was commissioned to produce six murals for the principal hall of the hoemstead. The paintings depict episodes from the early settlement and development of the Manifold family at Purrumbete and remain among the most significant decorative features of the house. Together with Purchas' architectural work, the murals have contributed substantially to the property's heritage significance.

By the early 1890s the station supported an extensive complex of more than 20 outbuildings. While most were timber, the men's quarters were constructed of bluestone. Surviving buildings include the coach house, stables, dairy, carpenter's and blacksmith's workshop, manager's residence and cool store. The estate also retains an elaborate nineteenth-century water reticulation system supplied from Lake Purrumbete, comprising underground cast-iron pipes, tunnels and three bluestone water tanks. A rare turntable from the station's internal tramway, formerly used to move firewood carts behind the homestead, also survives.

Five generations of the Manifold family occupied Purrumbete between 1838 and 1983. Following the death of William Thomson Manifold in 1922, ownership passed to his son John Manifold, and after John's death in 1957 the property was purchased by his youngest son, William Grey Manifold, to ensure it remained within the family. In the years following the First World War much of the estate was resumed for Soldier Settlement, reducing the property from its original pastoral scale. By 1963 approximately 991 acres (401 ha) remained attached to the homestead.

After leaving Manifold ownership in 1983, Purrumbete passed through a succession of private owners including stockbroker Rene Rivkin, theatre entrepreneur David Marriner, artist and cheesemaker Roger Haldane, and later Max and Ann Magilton, who operated the property as a boutique bed-and-breakfast after purchasing it in 2001. In 2013 the estate was acquired by Lawrie Voutier, who has continued to maintain the homestead while leasing surrounding grazing land for cattle production. During changes of ownership there were unsuccessful attempts to remove Walter Withers' murals form the house, but the artworks remained in situ.

Purrumbete retains approximately two kilometres of frontage to Lake Purrumbete together with an important nineteenth-century garden containing mature specimens of Spanish fir, West Himalayan spruce, Bunya pine, Norfolk Island pine, cabbage tree, Himalayan cypress, cockspur coral tree and Monterey cypress.

== See also ==
- Geelong Grammar School
- Meningoort
- Talindert
