= Lake Purrumbete =

Volcanic lake in Victoria, Australia

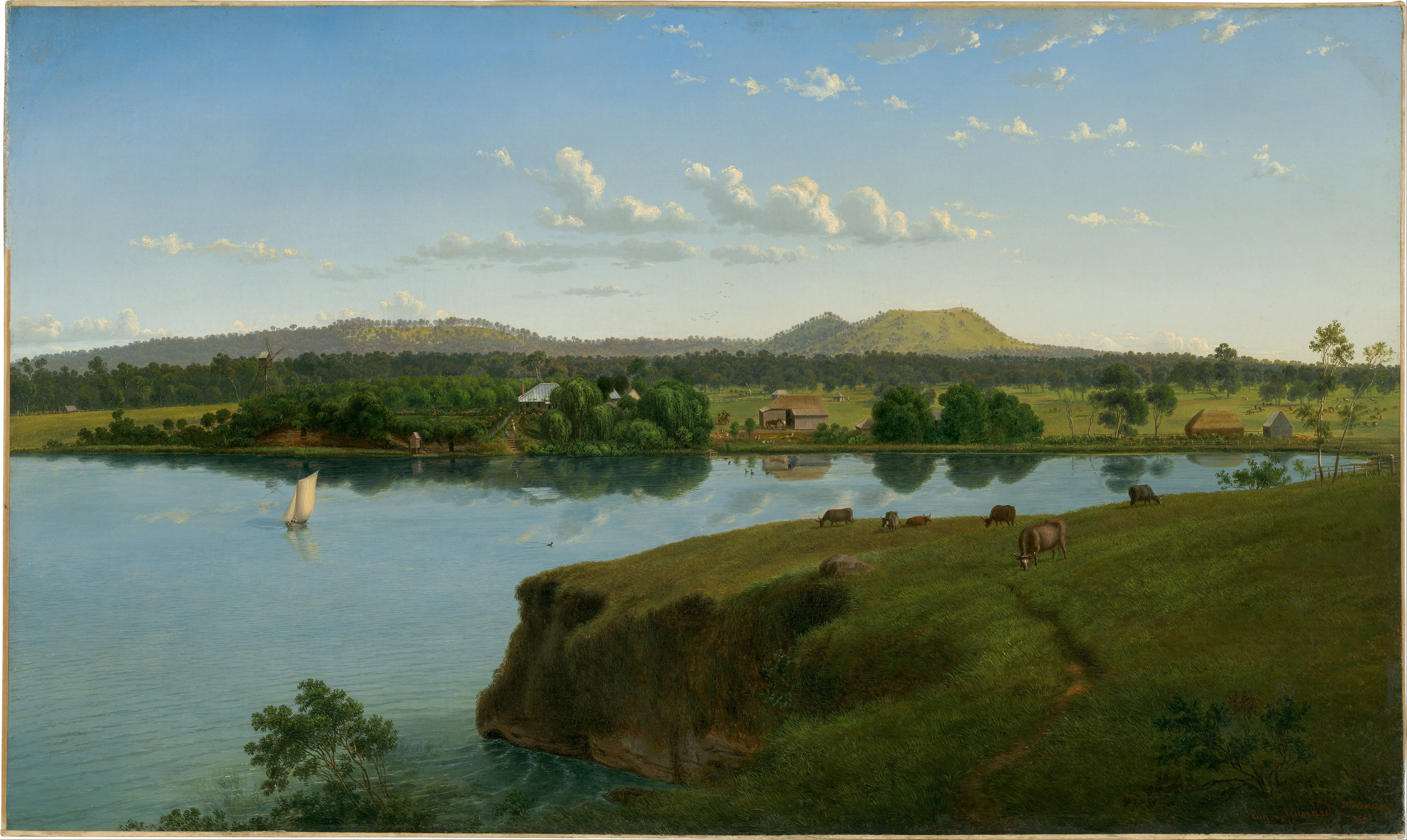
- Purrumbete from across the lake, by Eugene von Guerard (1858)

- Location in Victoria
- Location: Western District, Victoria
- Coordinates: 38°16′50″S 143°13′50″E
- Type: Volcanic lake
- Basin countries: Australia
- Max. length: 2.82 km (1.75 mi)
- Max. width: 2.66 km (1.65 mi)
- Surface area: 552 ha (1,360 acres)
- Average depth: 45 m (148 ft)
- Max. depth: 60 m (200 ft)
- Surface elevation: 149 m (489 ft)

Lake Purrumbete is a volcanic lake in the Western District of Victoria, Australia. Lake Purrumbete is approximately 15 km (9.3 mi) east of the town of Camperdown. The lake is in a shallow maar. The water is crystal clear most times of the year as the lake relies totally on its own catchment.

== Recreational activities ==
Lake Purrumbete is a prime destination for anglers chasing chinook salmon and rainbow and brown trout. The banks are heavily weeded at places, but the depth drops sharply; once away from the bank, it can get more than 60 m (200 ft) deep. There are heavy-duty boat ramps and jetties at the caravan park.

The Lake Purrumbete Caravan Park has cabins, ice, public toilets, mooring facilities, jetties, fish cleaning facilities, day parking and a dual lane concrete boat ramp. The park is on the foreshore at the lake's southern end.

== Formation ==
Lake Purrumbete is a maar located east of Camperdown in the state of Victoria in Australia. The maar is located in a volcanic landscape, which geologists call Newer Volcanics Province. The lake is a 45 m (148 ft) deep maar with a diameter of 2.5 km (1.6 mi). It was caused by a volcanic eruption when hot magma came in contact with groundwater. Though a date of 20,000 years has been attributed to the eruption, there is no scientific data to back that up.

In Australia, most of the maars are in the southern part of Victoria's Western District, of which more than 30 are between Colac and Warrnambool. Lake Purrumbete and the maar Tower Hill are well-known examples. Lake Purrumbete, Lake Bullen Merri and Lake Gnotuk are small maars that are fed by groundwater. The larger lakes, such as Lake Colongulac and Lake Corangamite, Victoria's largest lake, were formed in large lowlands as streams were shut off by lava flows and filled with water.

== See also ==
- Purrumbete, an adjacent homestead
- List of lakes of Australia § Victoria
- List of volcanoes in Australia § Victoria
