= Jill Baker (publisher) =

Australian journalist and newspaper editor

Jill Baker is an Australian journalist and current editor of the weekend edition of the Melbourne tabloid the Herald Sun.

== Career ==
Baker has worked as a journalist at The Australian, Melbourne daily The Age, and The Herald. She has also been deputy editor of The Age and the Herald Sun, and editor of The Sunday Age. Baker also spent time at ACP Magazines as a group publisher. She is currently editor of the weekend edition of the Herald Sun.

== Awards ==
Baker won a 2011 Walkley Award in the Newspaper Feature Writing category for her article The Big C and Me. The story chronicled a year in Baker's life in which she received a cancer diagnosis and treatment following her husband's unexpected death, and also won her a Quill Awards Gold Quill and a Sir Keith Murdoch Award for Excellence in Journalism.
