= Guyon Purchas =

Australian architect

- Born: Robert Guyon Whittlesey Purchas; 6 September 1862; Kew, Melbourne, Victoria
- Died: 4 June 1940 (aged 77); Olinda, Victoria
- Education: University of Melbourne (did not graduate)
- Occupation: Architect
- Spouse: Mary Teague
- Parent: Albert Purchas
- Practice: Purchas & Shields; Purchas & Teague

Robert Guyon Whittlesey Purchas (6 September 1862 – 4 June 1940) was an Australian architect, especially noted as a pioneer of the Arts & Crafts style seen in a number of large residential projects in the late 1890s and early 1900s. He was the son of prominent architect, civil engineer, and surveyor, Albert Purchas.

== Biography ==
Guyon Purchas was born on 6 September 1862 in his father's mansion in Fitzwilliam Street, Kew, Melbourne, and he spent his childhood in suburbs of Kew and Hawthorn. After private secondary schooling, he sat for the matriculation examination of the University of Melbourne in February 1882, where he studied civil engineering and concurrent with this he commenced articles in his father's office. He reportedly failed a number of subjects during the second year, the reason said to be receiving his first big commission. His father however deemed one year of architectural experience to be worth three years of study.

Guyon established his own practice in 1884, and also travelled overseas. In the 1880s he designed a number of houses and extensions in typical styles of the day, with the plain red brick picturesque Gothic and fretwork gables of Endion (now Kingsgate) at 252 Domain Road, South Yarra built in 1890 hinting at his developing interests. A major project and the first of a number of hospital commissions was a substantial addition to the Women's Hospital on the corner of Grattan and Cardigan Streets in Carlton completed in 1888. The ward blocks were in a similar plain red brick style to Endion, while the entry block was in an unusual interpretation of Queen Anne style. In 1889 he married Mary Teague, a widow whose son Eric Teague would later become his partner in his firm Purchas & Teague. In 1891-2 he built a mansion for himself and his family called Tay Creggan on a steep riverside site in Hawthorn.

Notices at the time stated his wife was then departing overseas, perhaps to join her husband, or he may also have tried his luck in gold boom Western Australia like many other architects, but by late 1894 he is noted as the architect of extensions for the Women's Hospital in Carlton.

At the end of 1896 Guyon went into partnership with William Shields. Their first project was a new hotel (Note: Presumably this was the Commercial Hotel, now the Holgate Brewhouse) In the late 1890s he contributed many articles to the local journal Arts & Crafts, and ran a course in Applied Art at the National Gallery School, which was focussed on wood carving. The class of 1896 was entirely female students, and the results were favourably reviewed, the products described as in various historic styles but also representing the growing desire for 'art in the household'.

He was then engaged for his first project adding to and extending a large homestead in Victoria's rural Western District, then undergoing a period of growth. Many homesteads were rebuilt or greatly altered and extended at this time, with many notable examples in the new Arts & Crafts style. Purchas' design for Coragulac near Colac in 1897 involved a large addition to the earlier formal bluestone house, in matching bluestone, but as a picturesque compositions including a semi-circular bay with conical roof. The interiors included extensive use of plasterwork in the new Art Nouveau style, and a large timber fireplace with carved dragons on the corners, as seen at Tay Greggan. Coragulac was for the Robertson family, and this was followed by the work for which Purchas is best known, the extensive alterations to Purrumbete, with its multiple gables and lofty great hall, compete with minstrel's gallery with an elaborate Art Nouveau carved screen and integral artworks. This was for W T Manifold, a member of one of the most prominent Western District families, and was followed a few years later by work at the adjacent Wiridgil, for his brother Edward Manifold.

Another large project continued in many stages was the rebuilding of the Children's Hospital in Carlton, beginning with a simply designed outpatients wing opened in 1899. The next stage was the far more prominent Princess May Pavilion on the corner of Drummond and Pelham Streets, completed in 1902. A tall design in red brick with lofty elaborate Dutch gables sporting oriel windows on three sides, and much plainer brick arched western elevation with inset verandahs. A nurses home was added in 1907, in a similar though less elaborate style facing Nicholson Street, though this, and the even plainer Edward Wilson wing facing Pelham Street built in 1913, are recorded as by William Shields alone.

By 1906 William Shields then left to establish his own practice, and Purchas took his stepson on as a partner forming Purchas & Teague, who designed a range of warehouses and office buildings in the Melbourne's CBD in the next 10 years. In 1913 they designed a new Wool Exchange in King Street in a very early example of the revival of the Neoclassical, complete with engaged columns and pediment, but still in Edwardian red brick. It is also noted for its early use of reinforced concrete.

In 1923 he retired from practice, and moved to the Blue Mountains in 1927. He returned to Victoria to Olinda in 1940, dying there the same year.

== Notable projects ==
=== Tay Creggan ===
In 1891-2 Guyon designed and built a large house for himself on a steep site on the Yarra River in Hawthorn, which he named Tay Creggan. Its extraordinary style led to suggestions that it was a copy of a house in England but there is no evidence for this. The house is more inventive than most Melbourne houses of the time, an imposing fantasy of shingled bays and window hoods, balconies and gables, a vibrant mix of English vernacular elements put together in an utterly romantic and picturesque way. After the sale of the house to the Spencer family, Purchas was invented back to redesign major rooms, creating the most important interiors in c1898. He rebuilt the central hall with a stair of finely worked kauri timber, with a notable stained glass window by William Montgomery depicting a hunting scene above, and tiled fireplace with beaten copper panel depicting the Spencer family crest. The most outstanding room is the billiard room, created out of the former ballroom, which is remarkable for the three stained glass domes above, the enormous Scottish Oak fireplace with Art Nouveau style copper repousse work, and the carved decoration of the roof timbers, which have carved dragons on the beam ends.

=== Purrumbete ===
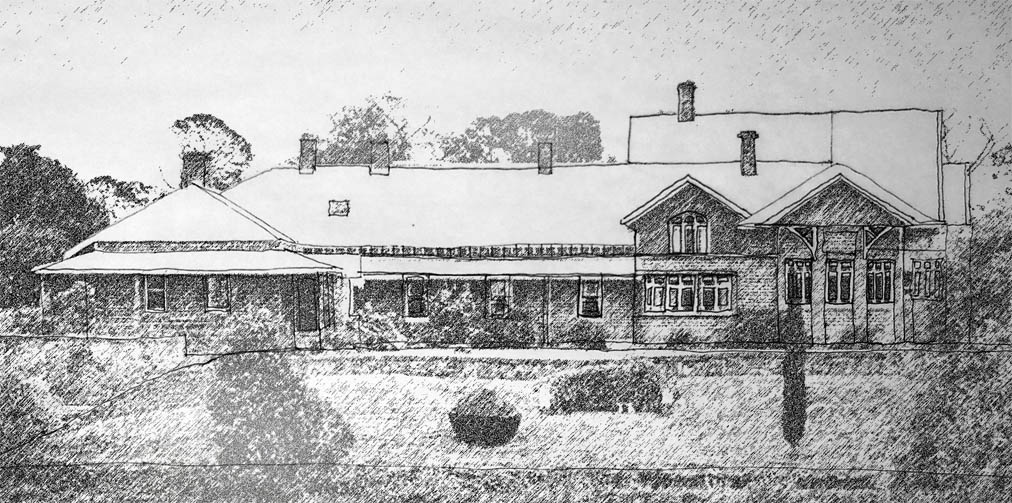
Purrumbete Sketch

The extensions and alterations to Purrumbete of 1902 can be considered a monument of Guyon's design sensibility and shows that his creativity was not lost during the depression. Designed for the Manifold family in the Western District, Purrumbete was in great contrast to Woodend Hotel. The homestead consisted of bluestone portions from 1860 and 1882, the latter part altered by Purchas, with new interiors and a second floor, along with an entirely new wing. All the elements of spatial design reflect the approach of the Arts & Crafts movement, creating an unusual Federation Arts and Crafts style. Guyon shows an understanding of a nascent Modernism, such as a logical progression of functional spaces and the use of solid and void as expression. Guyon's sensitivity allowed him to ensure each part of the alterations contributed to the unity of the whole building. The Arts & Crafts interiors include Art Nouveau details, and a spectacular great hall, with a minstrels gallery, and a series of integral painting by Walter Withers.

== List of projects ==
Guyon Purchas

- 1886 – Wilton, Cotham Road, Kew (now Kew RSL)
- 1888 – Genevieve Wing, Women's Hospital, Carlton (dem)
- 1890 – Endion (now Kingsgate), 252 Domain Road, South Yarra
- 1892 – Tay Creggan, Hawthorn
- 1898 – Tay Creggan, Hawthorn, new stairhall and billiard room

Purchas & Shields

- 1896 – Commercial Hotel, Woodend
- 1897 – Coragulac, near Colac, alterations and additions
- 1902 – Purrumbete, Camperdown, alterations and additions.
- 1901-2 – Princess May Pavilion, Children's Hospital, Carlton

Purchas & Teague

- 1906 – Fairlie, South Yarra, alterations (dem)
- 1907 – Wiridgil extension, Camperdown, additions
- 1908 – Bernard, Acland Street, South Yarra (dem)
- 1913 – St Helens, Flinders (dem)
- 1913 – Wool Exchange, King street, Melbourne

== Gallery ==
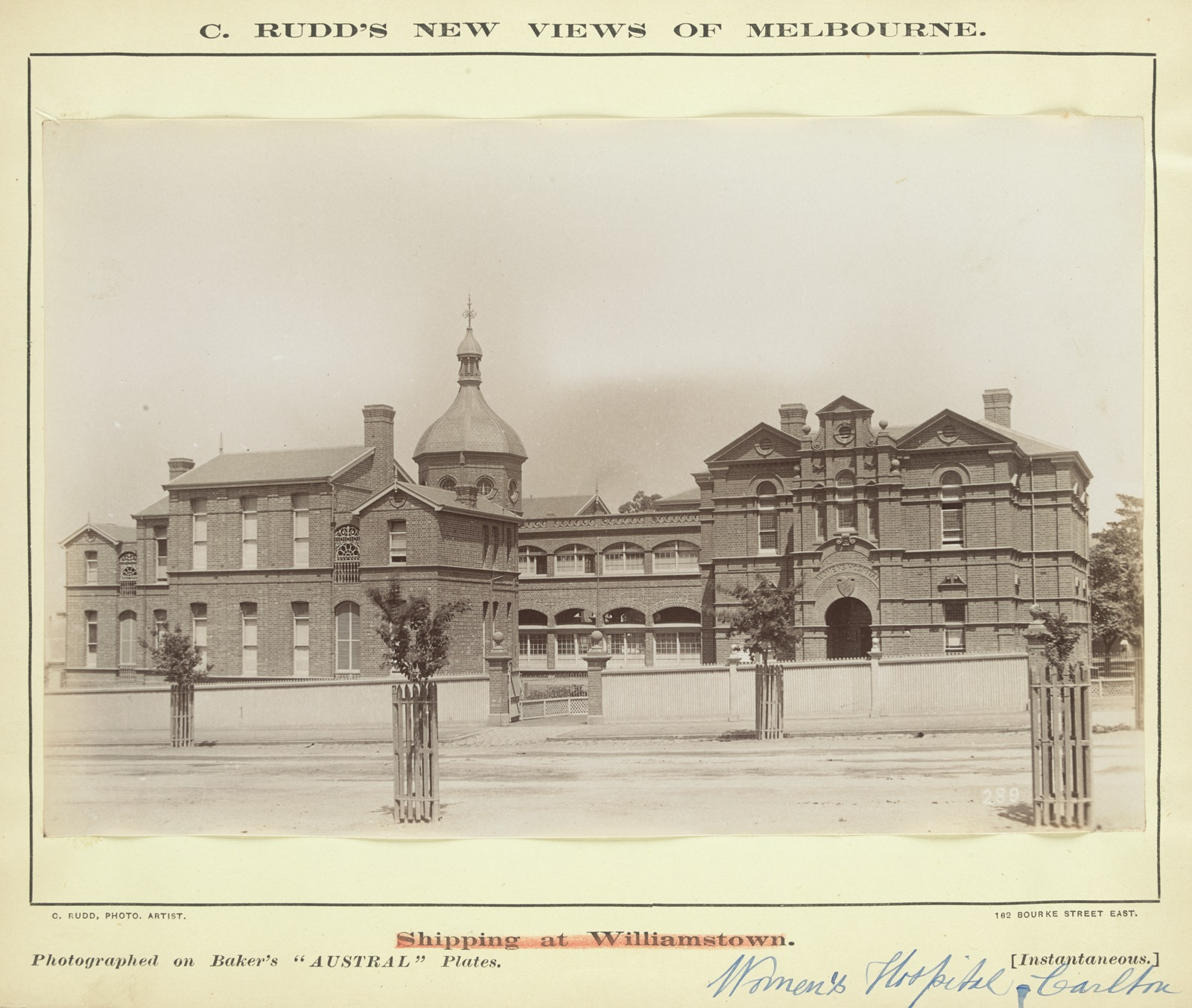
Genevieve Wing, Women's Hospital, 1888

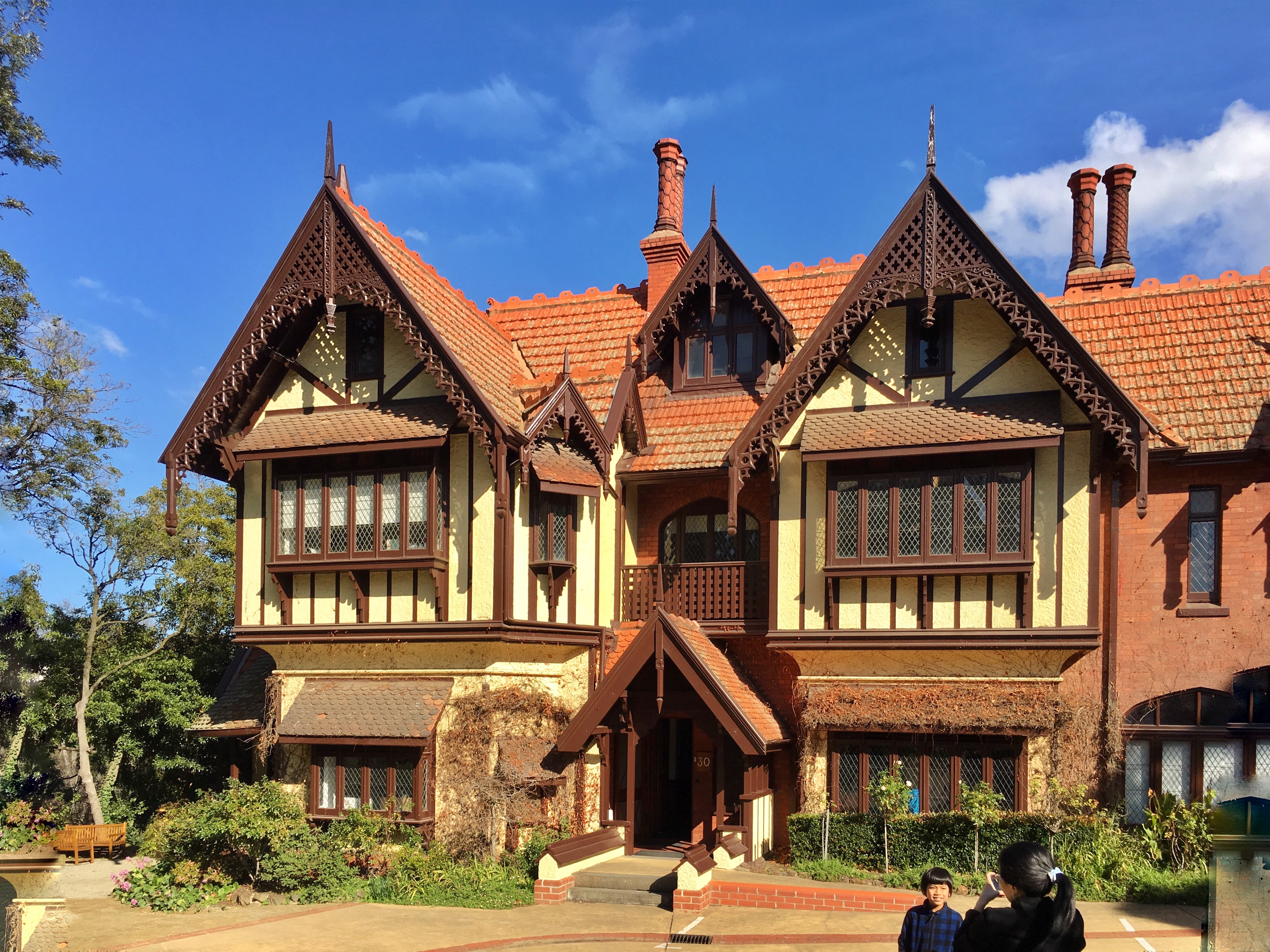
Tay Creggan, Hawthorn, 1892

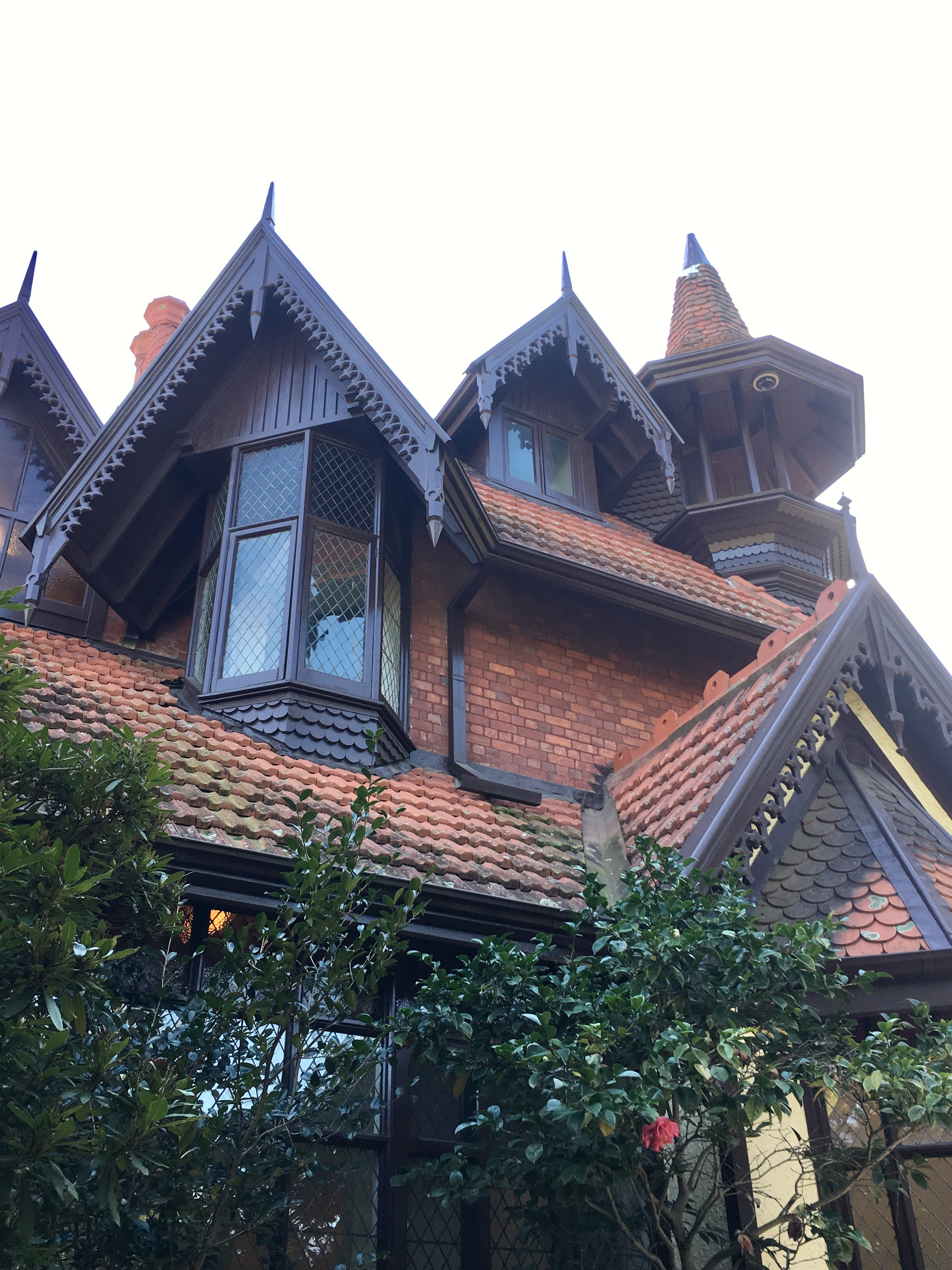
Tay Creggan, corner detail, 1892

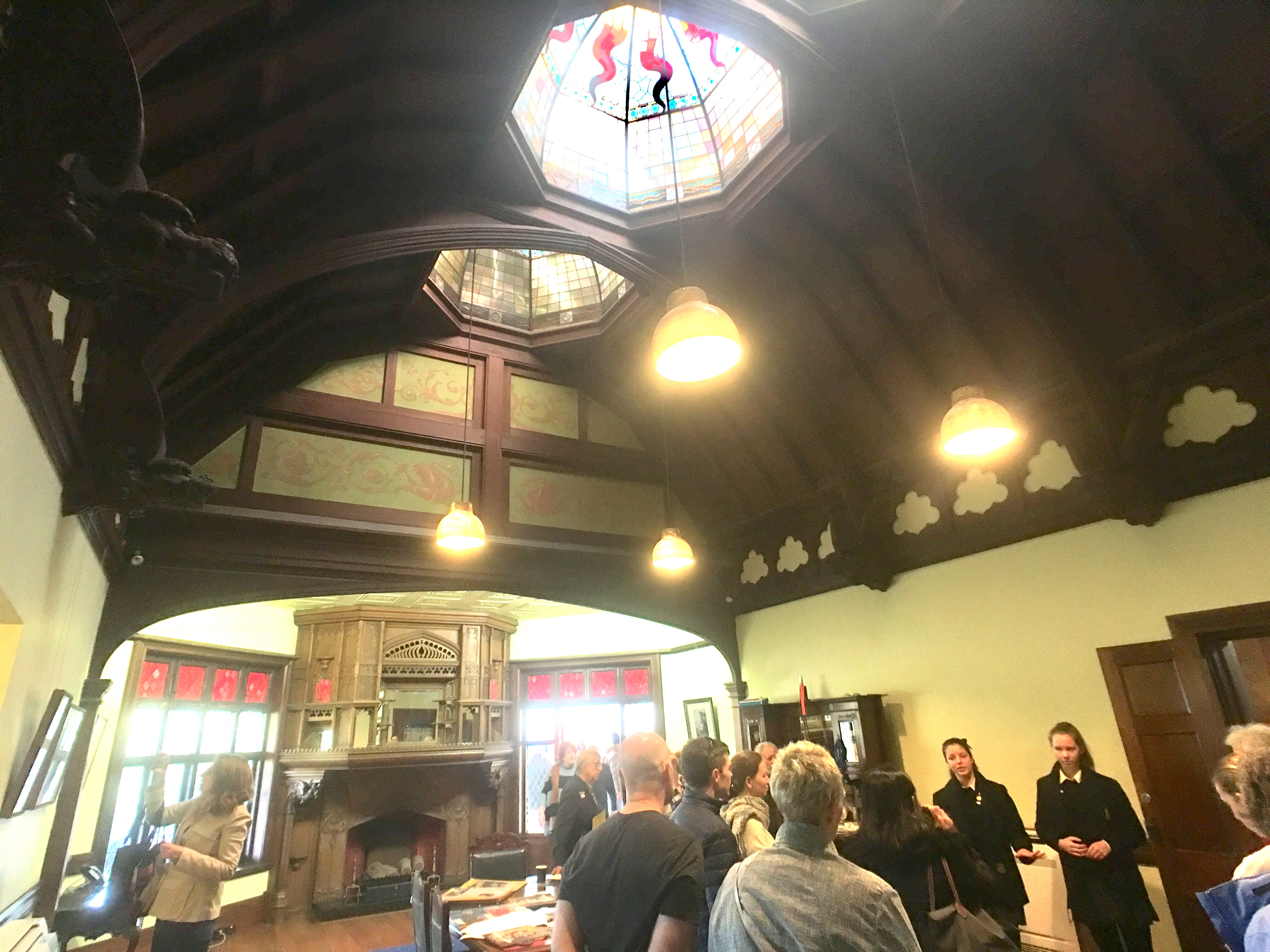
Tay Creggan billiard room, 1898

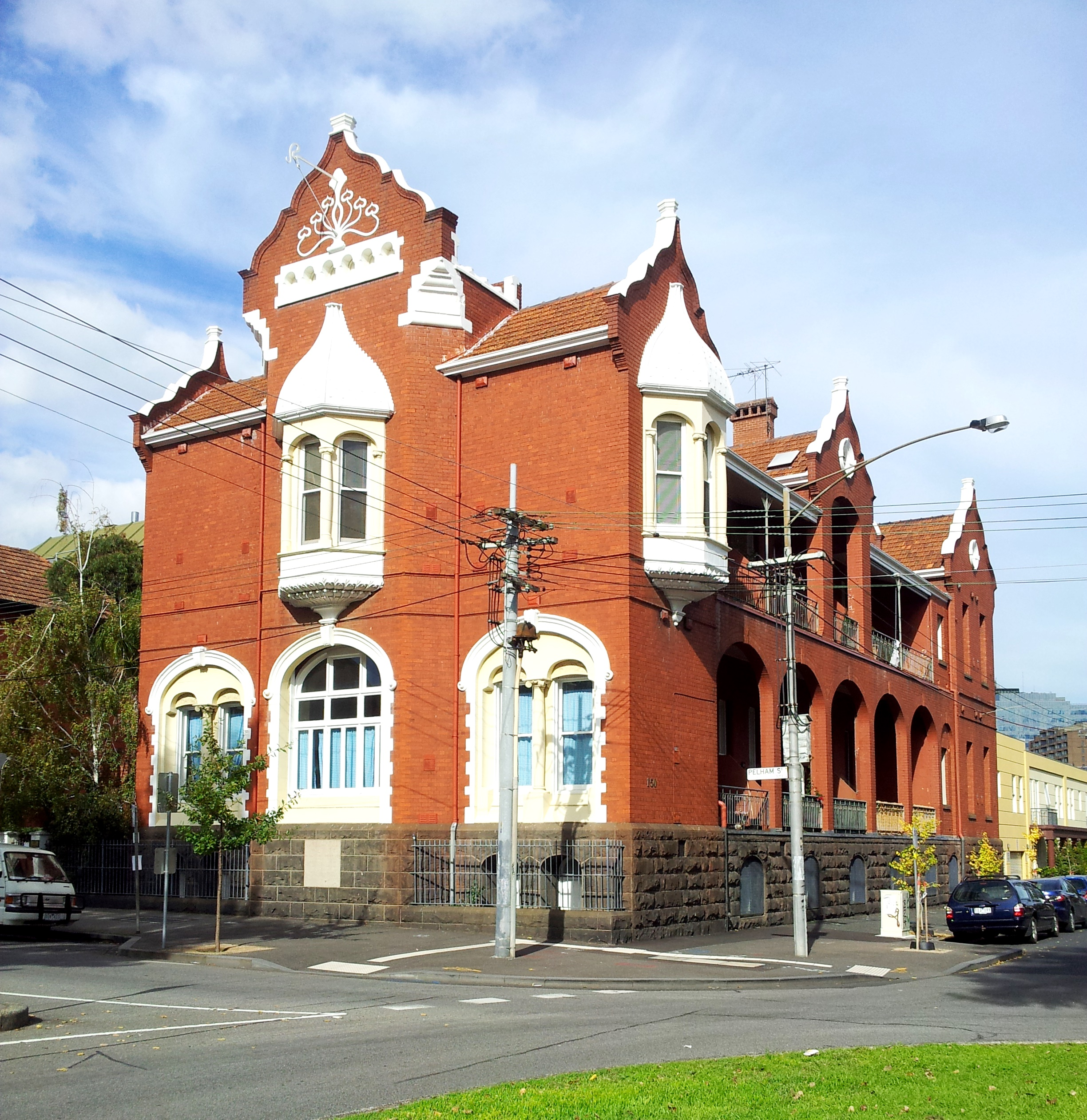
Princess May Pavilion, former Children's Hospital, 1902
