= Minjah =

Historic homestead in Victoria, Australia

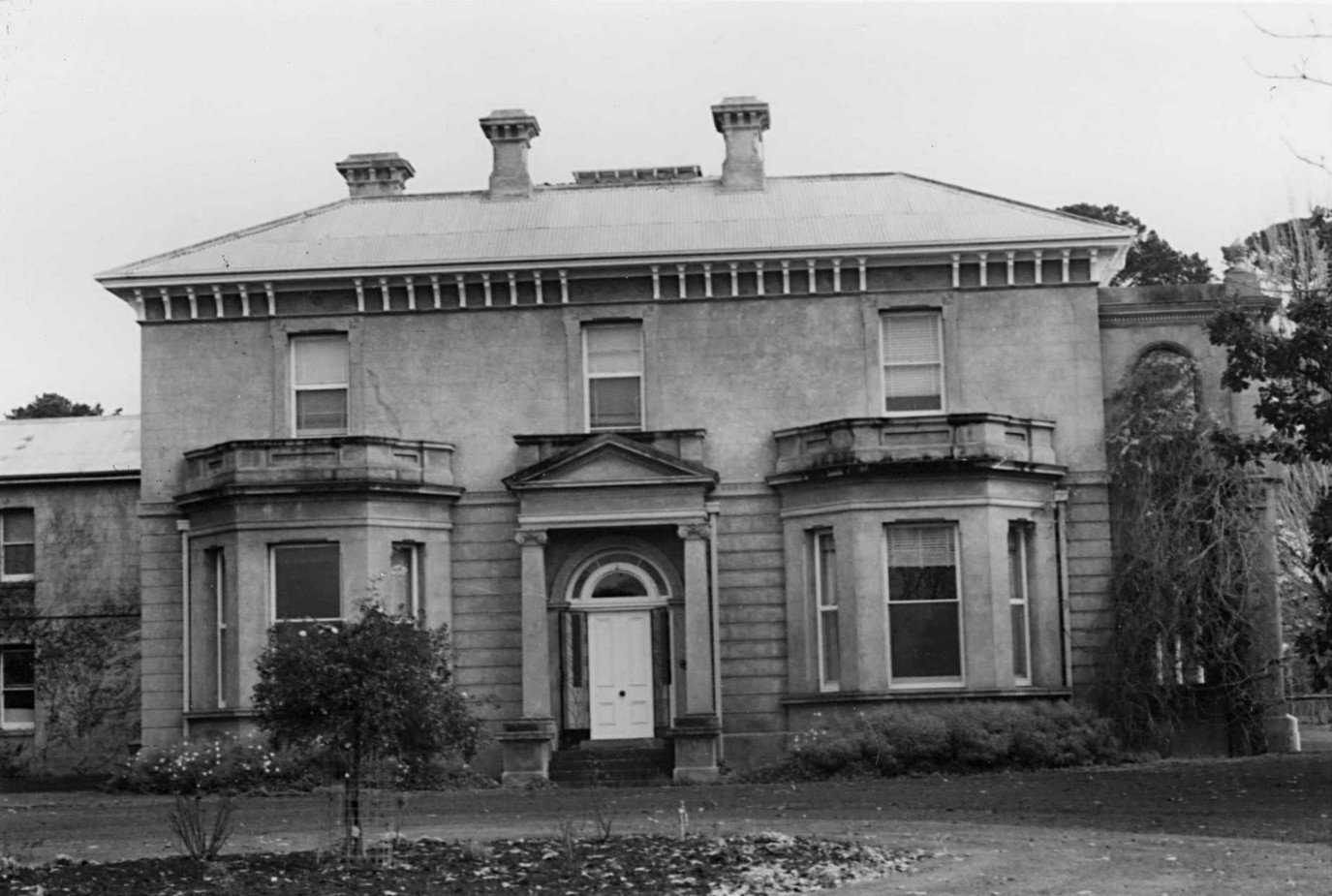
- Minjah Homestead, 1984

- Location in the Shire of Moyne, Victoria
- 38°04′39″S 142°27′23″E
- Type: Homestead, associated built facilities and grounds
- Location: Minjah, Victoria, Australia
- Nearest city: Warrnambool

History
- Built: 1870
- Built for: Joseph Ware

Site notes
- Architect: Andrew Kerr
- Architectural styles: Neoclassical, Georgian

Victorian Heritage Register
- Official name: Minjah
- Type: State heritage (built and natural)
- Designated: 5 December 1963
- Reference no.: 69286

Minjah is a historic pastoral property and homestead near Caramut, Victoria, Australia. Situated in Victoria's Western District, the estate originated as part of one of the region's earliest pastoral runs and developed into a major grazing property during the nineteenth century. The homestead, a substantial two-storey mansion constructed in 1870, is notable for its association with the Ware family, one of the most prominent pastoral dynasties in western Victoria, and for its landscaped grounds and collation of mature nineteenth-century trees. The property remains a working agricultural enterprise and is listed on the Victorian Heritage Register.

== History ==
The land that would become Minjah formed part of one of the earliest pastoral occupations of Victoria's Western District. During the early 1840s it lay within a vast pastoral empire established by Armyne, George and Lemuel Bolden, brothers from Lancashire, England, who brought experience in Shorthorn cattle breeding to the Port Phillip District. Their holdings eventually extended across approximately 300,000 acres between present-day Caramut, Mortlake, Warrnambool and Hawkesdale. The brothers imported livestock from England and established an acclaimed Shorthorn stud, with large portions of their grazing land devoted to cattle production.

Despite the scale of their enterprise, the Boldens' fortunes collapsed rapidly. George Bolden died in 1843 following a riding accident, and within months his brother Armyne also died. The resulting financial difficulties led to the breakup of the family's holdings. Contemporary writer Thomas Alexander Browne, later famous under the pen name Rolf Boldrewood, witnessed both the prosperity and subsequent dispersal of the Bolden properties. Following the collapse of the enterprise, stock and grazing rights were sold and the land passed into new ownership.

In October 1845 the grazing rights to the run were acquired by Jeremiah George Ware, Joseph Ware and John Ware. The Ware brothers were among the most successful pastoralists in colonial Victoria and would ultimately control a network of properties extending across much of the Western District. Minjah, then known as "Hamilton's Run", and comprising approximately 22,500 acres, formed on component of a pastoral empire that included Native Creek, Wooriwyrite, Koort Koort Nong, Yalla-Y-Poora and Muston's Creek, later known as Barwidgee.

Under the Wares, Minjah developed into an important grazing property. Following the death of Jeremiah Ware in 1859, Joseph Ware assumed control of Minjah and the neighbouring Barwidgee estate, operating the two stations in conjunction. The property prospered through sheep grazing and cattle breeding. Like the Boldens before them, the Ware family imported Shorthorn cattle from England.

A major transformation occurred in 1870 when Joseph Ware commissioned Warrnambool-based architect Andrew Kerr to design a grand new homestead. Constructed from bluestone quarried on the property and subsequently rendered, the two-storey mansion contained approximately thirty rooms and ranked among the largest pastoral residences in western Victoria. The house was designed in a restrained Georgian Revival and Neoclassical style and occupied a commanding position within the estate.

The grounds surrounding the mansion were developed as an ornamental landscape. Charles Scoborio, curator of the Warrnambool Botanic Gardens, was engaged to design the gardens, which incorporated both exotic and native plantings. Many nineteenth-century specimens survive, including oak, elm, hawthorn, cedar, kurrajong and linden trees.

In 1897 Joseph Ware sold Minjah, then comprising approximately 9,000 acres, to Rutherford Albert "Alby" Affleck. The Affleck family would retain ownership for more than a century, making their tenure the longest in the property's history. During this period Minjah continued to operate as a substantial pastoral enterprise, with grazing remaining the principal land use. Additional infrastructure was constructed, including a woolshed on the Caramut Road, while the homestead the administrative centre of the estate.

The property was passed to James Albert de Little Affleck following the death of Alby Affleck in 1931. A significant reduction in the size of the estate occurred during the early 1950s when approximately 4,000 acres were resumed under Victoria's Soldier Settlement Scheme. The subdivision removed the Minjah North section of the property and several farms fronting the Caramut-Warrnambool Road.

James Ramsey Rutherford "Bim" Affleck assumed responsibility for the property in 1974 and oversaw a period of modernisation. After the death of James Albert de Little Affleck, portions of the estate were sold to meet probate obligations, reducing the property to approximately 3,500 acres. Despite these reductions, significant investments was made in the conservation of the homestead. Works included the installation of a new roof, reconstruction of the servants' wing and alterations to the verandahs.

The property entered a new phase in 2005 when it was acquired by Tim and Jenny Clarke. Extensive restorations works were undertaken, including replacement of the roof using imported Welsh slate. Additional land acquisitions expanded the holding to approximately 7,500 acres, supplemented by leased land. The estate has continued to operate as a mixed grazing enterprise while maintaining the historic homestead, gardens and associated landscape.

== See also ==
- Yalla-Y-Poora
- Green Hills Homestead
