= Green Hills Homestead =

Historic homestead in Victoria, Australia

Green Hills
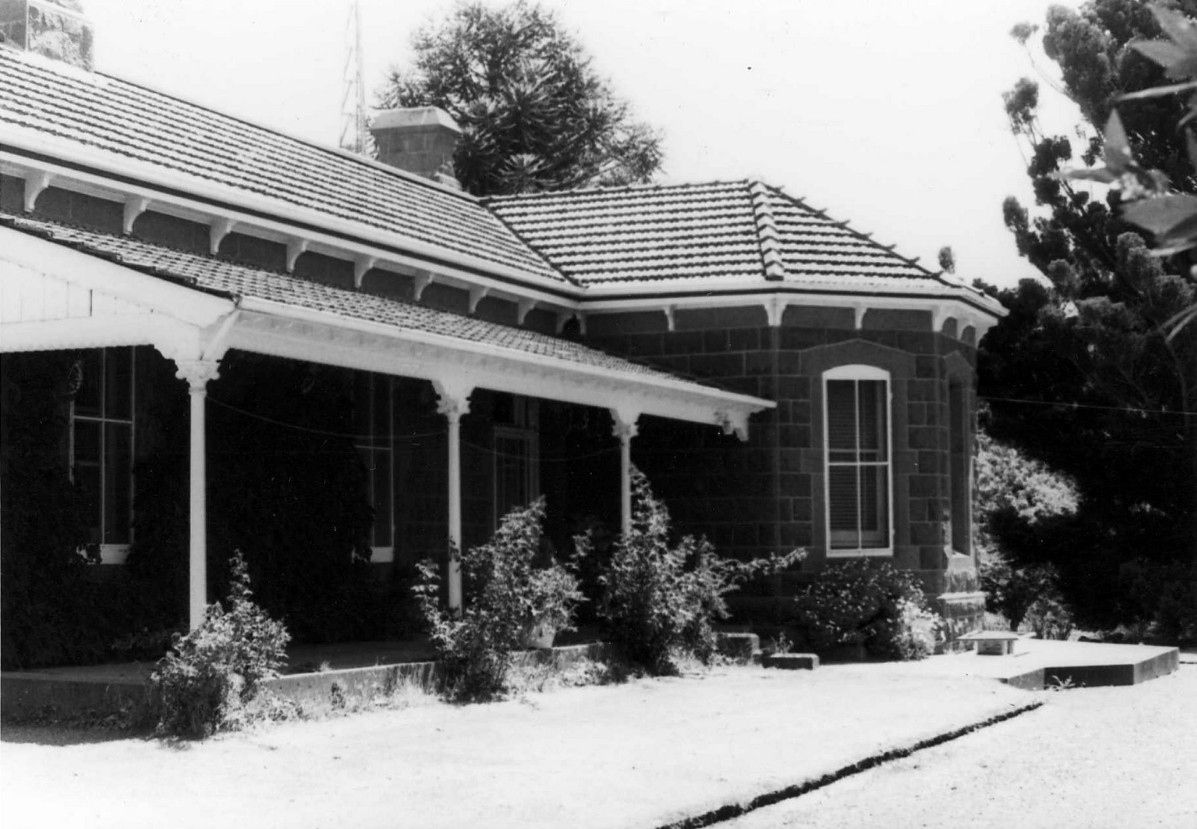
- Green Hills Homestead

- Location in the Shire of Moyne, Victoria
- 37°59′16″S 142°22′25″E
- Type: Homestead, associated built facilities and grounds
- Location: Minhamite, Victoria, Australia
- Nearest city: Warrnambool

History
- Built: 1872
- Built for: John Ware

Site notes
- Architect: Smith & Johnson
- Architectural style: Victorian

Green Hills is a historic pastoral property located in Minhamite in the Western District of Victoria, Australia. Established during the early years of European pastoral settlement, the property developed into a substantial grazing enterprise and remains associated with sheep and cattle production. The estate is particularly noted for its bluestone homestead, designed in 1872 by Melbourne architect Alfred Louis Smith of the architectural firm Smith & Johnson, as well as its long association with the Ware and Boyd families.

== History ==
The land the became Green Hills was first occupied during the early pastoral expansion of the Port Phillip District. The run was originally taken up in 1840 by Matthew Gibb on behalf of Captain Swanston. The property subsequently passed through several hands, including Joseph Clarke in 1841, Robert Clarke, Edward Bell, who served as private secretary and acting aide-de-camp to Governor Charles La Trobe, and J. H. Webster. By 1843 the station had become known as Green Hils, the name it has retained ever since.

A significant turning point in the property's history came in 1861, when it was acquired by pastoralist John Ware. Under Ware's ownership, Green Hills became one of the established grazing properties of the district. Ware invested in substantial improvements to the estate, including the construction of stables and a coach house in 1868. Beneath these buildings, a large bluestone water tank was constructed, comparable in size to a squash court.

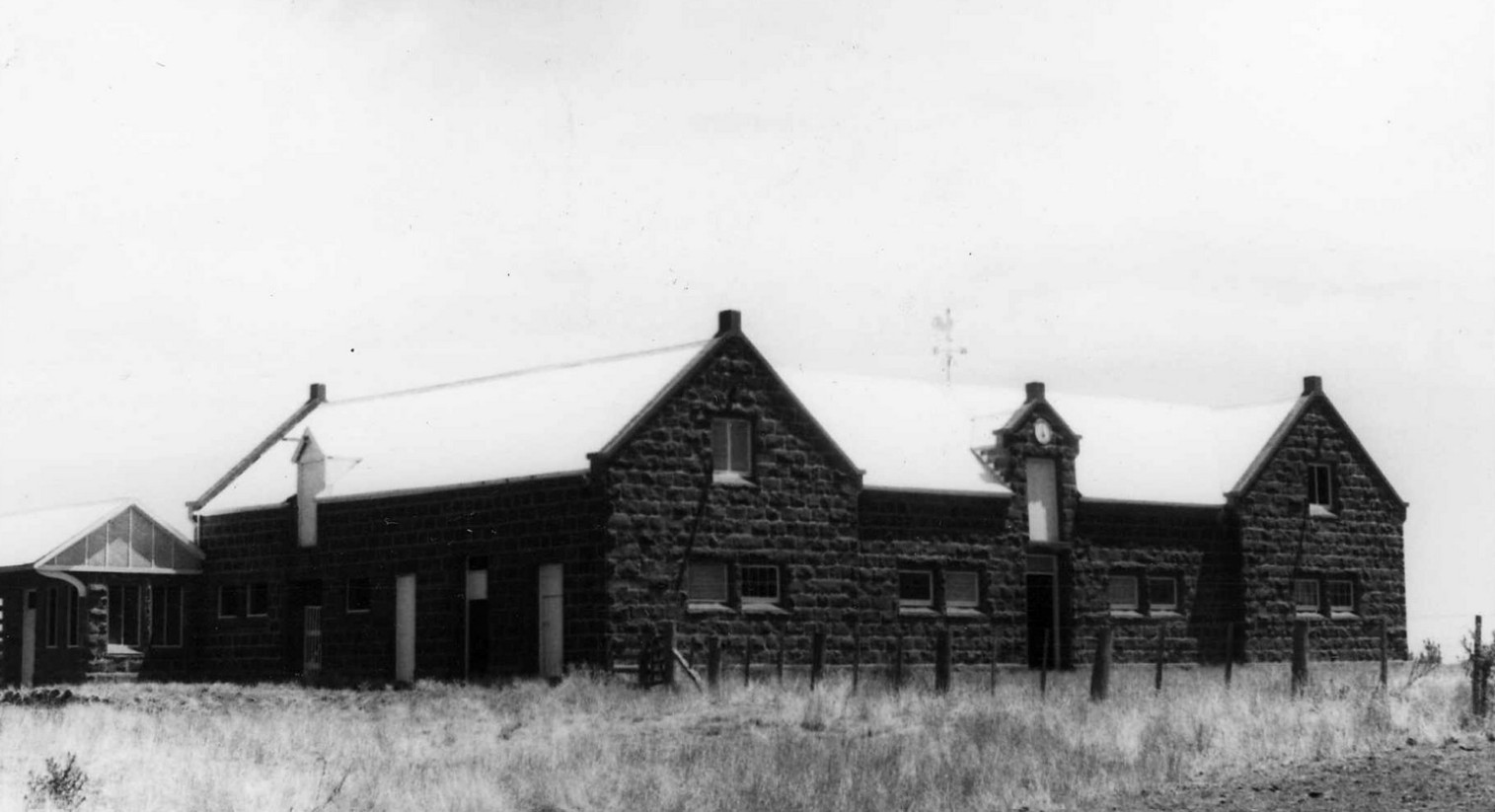
Outbuildings at Green Hills

In 1872 Ware commissioned a new homestead for the property. Tenders for the building were advertised in The Argus, and the residence was designed by Alfred Louis Smith of the Melbourne architectural firm Smith & Johnson. Smith was prominent Victorian whose work included the Melbourne Law Courts. The resulting homestead was constructed from bluestone and remains one of the property's defining features.

Although Ware retained ownership of Green Hills, he frequently leased the estate to family members and other pastoralists. Among those who occupied the property were his sister Amelia Ware and her husband John Howells. During the 1890s, the station was leased by Rutherford Albert "Alby" Affleck before he relocated to the nearby property Minjah. In 1898, Green Hills entered a new phased when the lease was acquired by James, Alexander and William Boyd, brothers from the nearby Tarrone station near Koroit. The Boyd family was of Scottish origin and already had a strong reputation within the Western District pastoral industry.

The property was offered for sale in December 1913. At auction, James Boyd successfully purchased the home block, comprising approximately 4,900 acres (2,000 ha), securing permanent Boyd family ownership. James Boyd remained unmarried and, upon his death in 1930, bequeathed the property to his nephew Cecil Boyd, the son of his brother Alexander. Ownership later passed to Cecil's son, Alec Boyd.

Throughout much of the twentieth century, Green Hills was managed by a succession of overseers and station managers. Among the most significant was Alec Henderson, Cecil Boyd's brother-in-law, who managed the property until his retirement in the mid-1970s. During this period, Green Hills continued to operate as a major sheep and cattle enterprise. Alec Boyd and his wife Isobel Kathrine "Kit" Boyd (nee Cave) moved to Green Hills in 1960 and became partners in the property during the 1970s. Following Alec Henderson's retirement, they took up residence in the homestead in 1980 and assumed direct management of the estate.

The homestead precinct includes a number of nineteenth-century structures associated with the operation of a large pastoral station, including the bluestone homestead, stables, coach house, woolshed, kitchen and men's quarters. The surrounding gardens contains a variety of mature plantings, including Mexican cypress, silver poplars, fruit trees, irises and ornamental species introduced by successive generations of owners. Among the most distinctive features are climbing roses along the western verandah, propagated from a variety developed by noted Australian rose breeder Alister Clark and named after Kit Boyd's mother, Catherine Noel Kininmonth.

A paddock below the homestead is known as the Graveyard Paddock because it contains the graves of two Chinese gardeners who are believed to have worked on the property cultivating vegetables along nearby Spring Creek.

In the early twenty-first century, the Boyd family diversified aspects of the property's operations, including the planting of Merlot and Cabernet France grapevines near the homestead in 2007. The estate continued to support a substantial grazing enterprise based on Murray Grey cattle and Cereal and Oil Seed Cropping program GreenHills Miniature Donkeys was established in 2013 by Kit Boyd and her daughter Sarah Hines, Producing registered Miniature Mediterranean Donkeys from Australian and Imported International bloodlines.

== See also ==
- Minjah
- Yalla-Y-Poora
