= Eeyeuk =

Historic homestead in Victoria, Australia

- Eeyeuk Homestead

- Location in Moyne Shire, Victoria
- 38°06′58″S 142°56′18″E
- Type: Homestead, associated built facilities and grounds
- Location: Kolora, Victoria, Australia
- Nearest city: Warrnambool

History
- Built: 1874
- Built for: Alexander Dennis (junior)

Site notes
- Architect: Alexander Hamilton
- Architectural style: Italianate

Eeyeuk is a historic pastoral property and homestead near Noorat in western Victoria, Australia. The property was acquired in 1867 by prominent Cornish-born pastoralist Alexander Dennis of Tarndwarncoort and has remained associated with the Dennis family for successive generations. Its two-storey bluestone homestead was built in 1874 for Alexander Dennis Jr to a design by Colac architect Alexander Hamilton, representing Hamilton's first substantial architectural commission. The largely intact residence is an early example of his conservative Italianate work and forms part of a group of Western District homesteads associated with his career.

== History ==
The land that became Eeyeuk originally formed part of the larger Keilambete pastoral run, first occupied by John Thomson and subsequently owned by Dr MacFarlane. Eeyeuk developed as a separate pastoral holding under MacFarlane before being sold in 1867 to Alexander Dennis, an early settler of the Colac district whose principal property was Tarndwarncoort near Birregurra. At the time of the transaction, Eeyeuk comprised approximately 5,800 acres.

Dennis placed the property in the hands of his sons Alexander Dennis Jr and Richard Dennis, who initially leased Eeyeuk from their father. Alexander later assumed sole control of the station. Additional purchases expanded the estate over time, and by the early twentieth century it comprised approximately 6,400 acres.

In 1874, Alexander Dennis Jr commissioned Alexander Hamilton to design a substantial new homestead at Eeyeuk. Hamilton was then at the beginning of his architectural career and was largely self-trained; Eeyeuk became his first major commission. Construction was undertaken by the Geelong contracting firm Martin & Heard, using basalt quarried locally on the property.

The resulting residence is a restrained two-storey Italianate house constructed from half-coursed basalt, originally beneath a hipped slate roof. A single-storey verandah extends around the building, giving the otherwise substantial and formally composed residence a relatively conservative appearance. Hamilton subsequently developed aspects of this architectural approach in other Western District commissions, notably Wooriwyrite near Noorat and Tarndwarncoort, the longstanding Dennis family property near Birregurra.

Rear of the homestead

In June 1905, the Dennis family experienced a tragedy at Eeyeuk when Annie Dennis, the 22-year-old second daughter of Alexander Dennis, died from a self-inflicted gunshot wound in the homestead. She had spent the preceding day participating in activities on the property and had played golf and cards on the day of her death. A subsequent inquiry determined that the fatal wound was self-inflicted. Contemporary reports noted the family's prominence within the district and the widespread sympathy expressed following her death.

The Dennis family's association with Eeyeuk continued through subsequent generations. Among its later residents was David John Alexander Dennis, who developed an interest in daffodil cultivation. A cultivar bred by Dennis and named 'Eeyeuk Sunset' after the property was registered in 1982.

Eeyeuk remains in the Dennis family and is owned by Sandy and Susan Dennis, maintaining a connection with the family that began with Alexander Dennis's purchase of the property in 1867. The 1874 homestead has also survived with comparatively little alteration. Its principal later changes include a single-storey concrete masonry addition adjoining the southern verandah wing and the replacement of the original slate roof with concrete tiles.

== See also ==
- Wooriwyrite
- Meningoort
- Dalvui
