= West Cloven Hills =

Historic homestead in Victoria, Australia

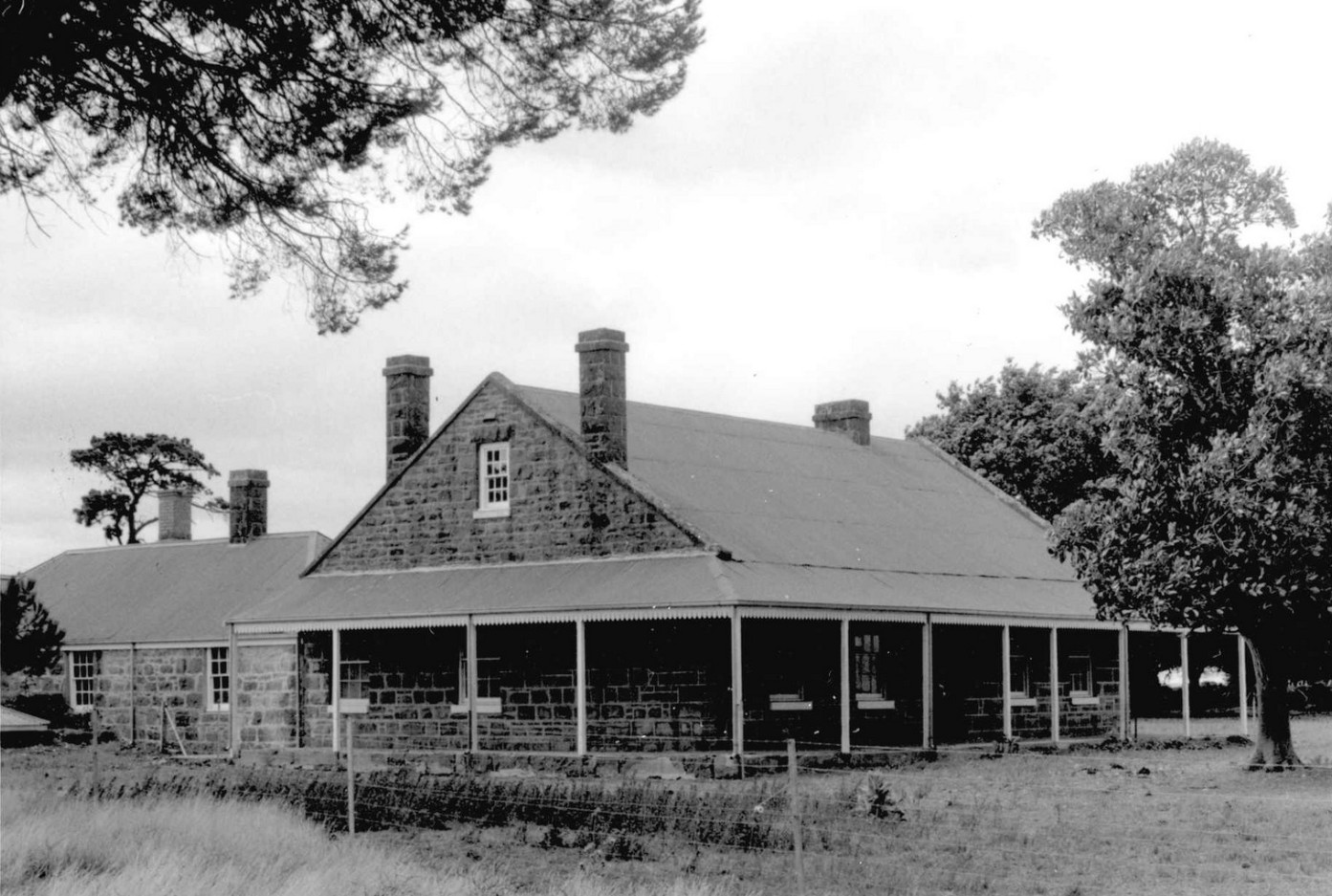
- West Cloven Hills Homestead

- Location in Corangamite Shire, Victoria
- 38°05′03″S 143°05′02″E
- Type: Homestead, associated built facilities and grounds
- Location: Bookaar, Victoria, Australia
- Nearest city: Colac

History
- Built: ~1850
- Built for: Nicholas Cole

Site notes
- Architectural style: Colonial Georgian

West Cloven Hills is a pastoral property located between Camperdown and Darlington in the Western District of Victoria, Australia. Established in 1842 following the division of an earlier pastoral run, the property has remained in the ownership of descendants of pioneer pastoralist Nicholas Cole for more than 180 years, making it one of the few pastoral stations in Victoria with continuous family ownership since European settlement. The estate is centred on a bluestone Colonial Georgian homestead, built around 1850, and includes one of the oldest surviving shearing sheds in the region.

== History ==
Nicholas Cole left Plymouth, Cornwall, in 1838 aboard the John Mellish after selling inherited estates at Rame Head. Arriving in Sydney in June 1839, he travelled to the Port Phillip District later that year aboard the Mary Hay, where he met fellow pastoralist Peter McArthur. After arriving in Melbourne and travelling to the fledgling settlement of Geelong, the pair purchased sheep from Peter Manifold at Purrumbete and formed a partnership to establish pastoral runs in the Western District. They took up the land that later became the West Cloven Hills and Meningoort runs, with West Cloven Hills initially operating as an outstation because of its limited water supply. A local Aboriginal man reputedly showed Cole the location of a native well on the property, providing a reliable water source.

The partnership between Cole and McArthur was dissolved in 1842, when the run was divided. Cole drew the boundary line through the property while McArthur was given the first choice of which portion to retain, resulting in the establishment of West Cloven Hills as a separate pastoral lease. The property occupied land beneath Mount Koang, a prominent volcanic landmark in the area.

Life on the frontier was marked by isolation and hardship. While McArthur was constructing a more substantial hut and Cole tended the sheep, the nearly completed building was accidentally destroyed by fire after its unfinished chimney caught alight while a leg of mutton was roasting inside. West Cloven Hills also suffered severe losses before the Black Thursday bushfires of February 1851. Having already experienced an earlier fire that destroyed stock, the woolshed and outbuildings, Cole escaped the devastation of Black Thursday itself, with only the dwelling surviving the earlier blaze.

Before 1851 Nicholas Cole erected the present Colonial Georgian homestead from locally quarried bluestone beneath the slopes of Mount Koang. The house features attic dormers, prominent stone gables and an encircling timber verandah. Around the same period Cole commissioned local contractor Mr Swan of Swan Marsh to construct a substantial bluestone shearing shed using stone quarried on the property. During construction, however, many of the stonemasons abandoned the project following the discovery of gold, leaving the walls only partly completed before a roof was added so the building could be used. The shearing shed, dating from 1851, survives on the property.

Nicholas Cole initially stocked West Cloven Hills with Merino sheep, developing a flock that combined fine wool production with larger body size. Foundation stock was obtained from Tasmania, while later rams were introduced from Ercildoune and Chalicum. His son, also named Nicholas Cole, established a recognised Merino stud and continued improving the flock with rams from Ercildoune, Carngham, and neighbouring Wooriwyrite. Around 1890 the family concluded that the district's rich volcanic soils were better suited to crossbred sheep, and Lincoln-Merino first crosses increasingly replaced pure Merinos on the more fertile country.

Nicholas Cole, born at West Cloven Hills in 1856, represented the second generation of the family to manage the property. Educated at Geelong Grammar School, he later inherited the station. He died there in November 1932.

During the twentieth century the property continued to evolve as a leading sheep-breeding enterprise. A Corriedale stud was established in 1935 before being dispersed in 1944 as attention returned to superfine Merinos. In 1951 another Corriedale stud, known as Warra Yadin, was founded and supplied rams for the station's commercial flock. The Merino flock was dispersed in 1964. In 1992 Nicholas Cole and Geoffrey Risbey purchased the Stanbury Corriedale Stud at Ceres, transferring it to West Cloven Hills.

In 1948 approximately 7,500 acres of the estate were acquired by the Soldier Settlement Commission for subdivision under the Soldier Settlement Scheme, although the homestead block remained in family ownership.

As of the early 21st century, West Cloven Hills comprises approximately 1,200 hectares (3,000 acres). The property supports a commercial flock of around 3,000 ewes alongside the Stanbury Corriedale stud, with stud rams tested under commercial grazing conditions.

The former married men's quarters have been restored as visitor accommodation.

== See also ==
- Koort Koort Nong
- Purrumbete
- Talindert
- Meningoort
- Geelong Grammar School
