= Blythvale =

Historic homestead in Victoria, Australia

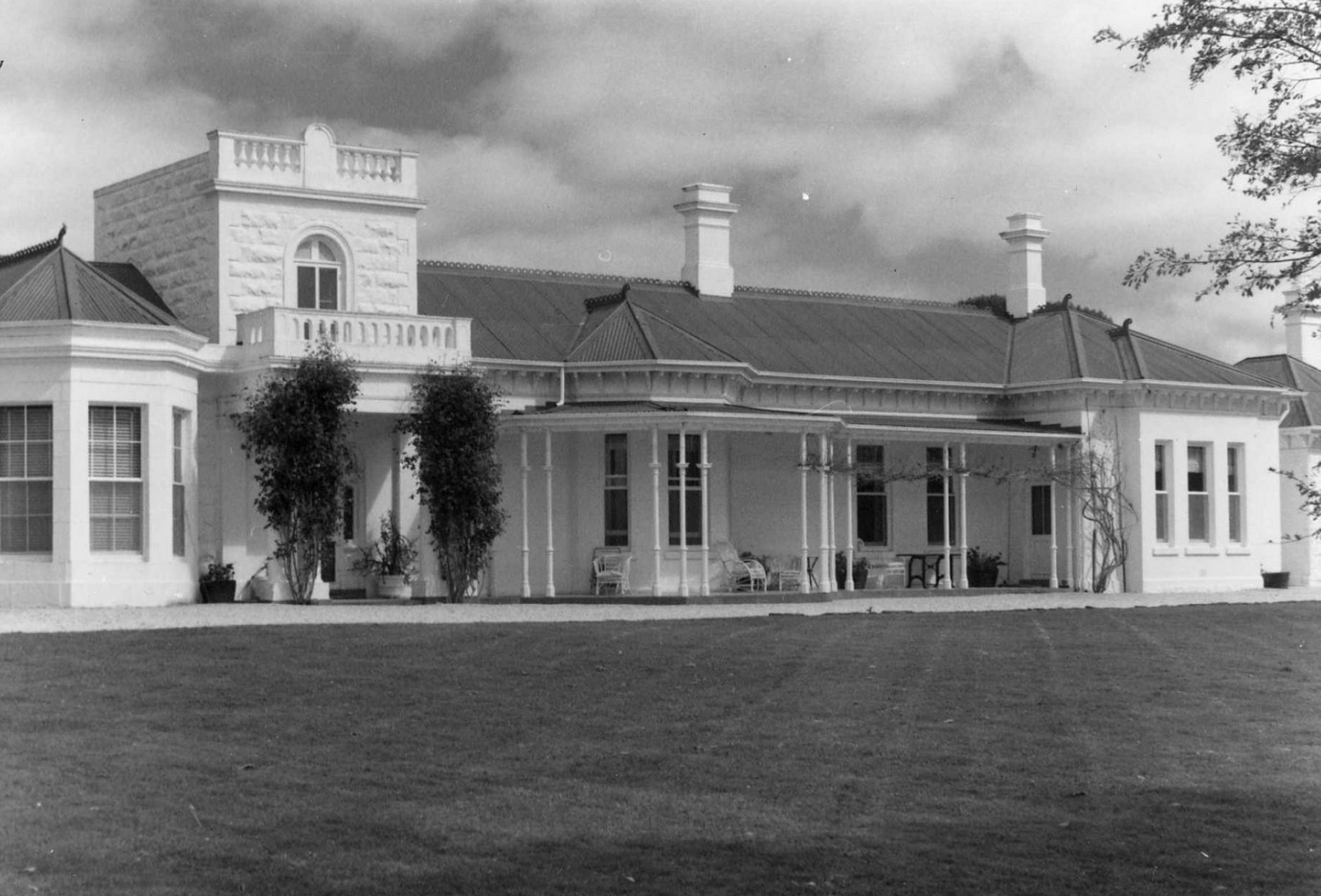
- Blythvale Homestead

- Location in Southern Grampians Shire, Victoria
- 37°38′42″S 143°04′13″E
- Type: Homestead, associated built facilities and grounds
- Location: Streatham, Victoria, Australia
- Nearest city: Ararat

History
- Built: ~1860s
- Built for: John Ritchie

Blythvale Homestead is a historic pastoral homestead near Streatham, Victoria, Australia. Dating principally from the 1860s, although parts of the building may originate from the 1840s, it was built for pastoralist John Ritchie and formed the centre of the extensive estate. The homestead is notable for its uncommon architectural composition, particularly its two-storey section with a balconied portico and balustrated parapet, and for its association with the early pastoral development of Victoria's Western District.

== History ==
The Blythvale pastoral estate was established during the early European settlement of Victoria's Western District. The present homestead was constructed principally during the 1860s for pastoralist John Ritchie, although parts of the building are believed to pre-date this period and may survive from the 1840s. Over time the residence was enlarged and altered, producing the rambling single-storey form seen today. The house is built largely of stuccoed masonry with sections of rusticated stone, while its most distinctive feature is the two-storey portion incorporating a balconied portico, a balustraded parapet of rounded arches, projecting wings, bay windows and a cast-iron verandah. The National Trust considers the building architecturally significant for both its composition and its unusual domestic design, while also recognising its historical associations with the settlement of the surrounding district.

John Ritchie died on 5 February 1882, after which the estate eventually passed into the hands of trustees.

In 1900 the trustees sold the Blythvale estate, comprising approximately 27,211 acres of freehold land together with 18,927 sheep, 67 cattle and 18 horses, to William Weatherly of nearby Woolongoon.

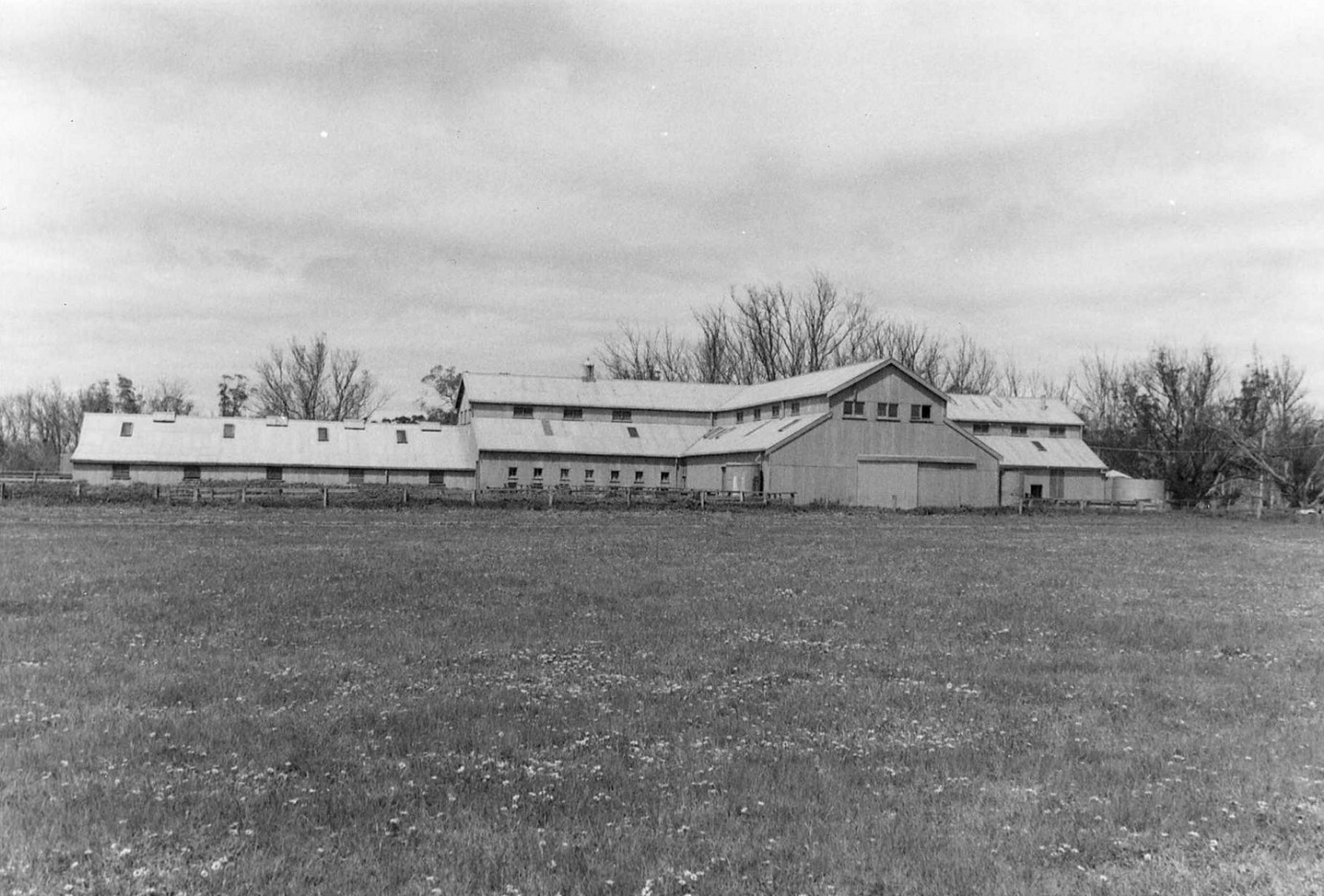
The woolshed

During Weatherly's ownership, portions of the estate were progressively subdivided. In 1910 he announced that approximately 9,000 acres on the northern and western portions of Blythvale would be offered for sale. Further subdivision followed in 1915, when several allotments were sold at public auction by Dalgety & Co. Ltd. and James W. Wilson on behalf of Weatherly's executors. Purchasers included F. E. Doery, M. H. Mellor, David McKay and E. J. Byrne.

Blythvale continued to operate as a large grazing property during the early twentieth century. In November 1903, a station employee, Andrew Callander, suffered a dislocated shoulder after being thrown from a horse while working on the property.

In February 1922, lightning ignited a grass fire on the property, destroying 150 and 200 acres before station workers brought it under control. Around this time, J. B. Pearson had leased Blythvale for a five-year term before subsequently taking up the lease of Muntham.

Another grass fire occurred in January 1933, although it was extinguished before significant damage was caused.

During a severe cyclonic storm in February 1946, electric light poles at Blythvale and nearby Streatham were blown down.

== See also ==
- Carranballac Homestead
- Larra
- Yarram Park
- Yalla-Y-Poora
- Mount William Homestead
