= Hawkesdale, Victoria =

Hawkesdale
- Town
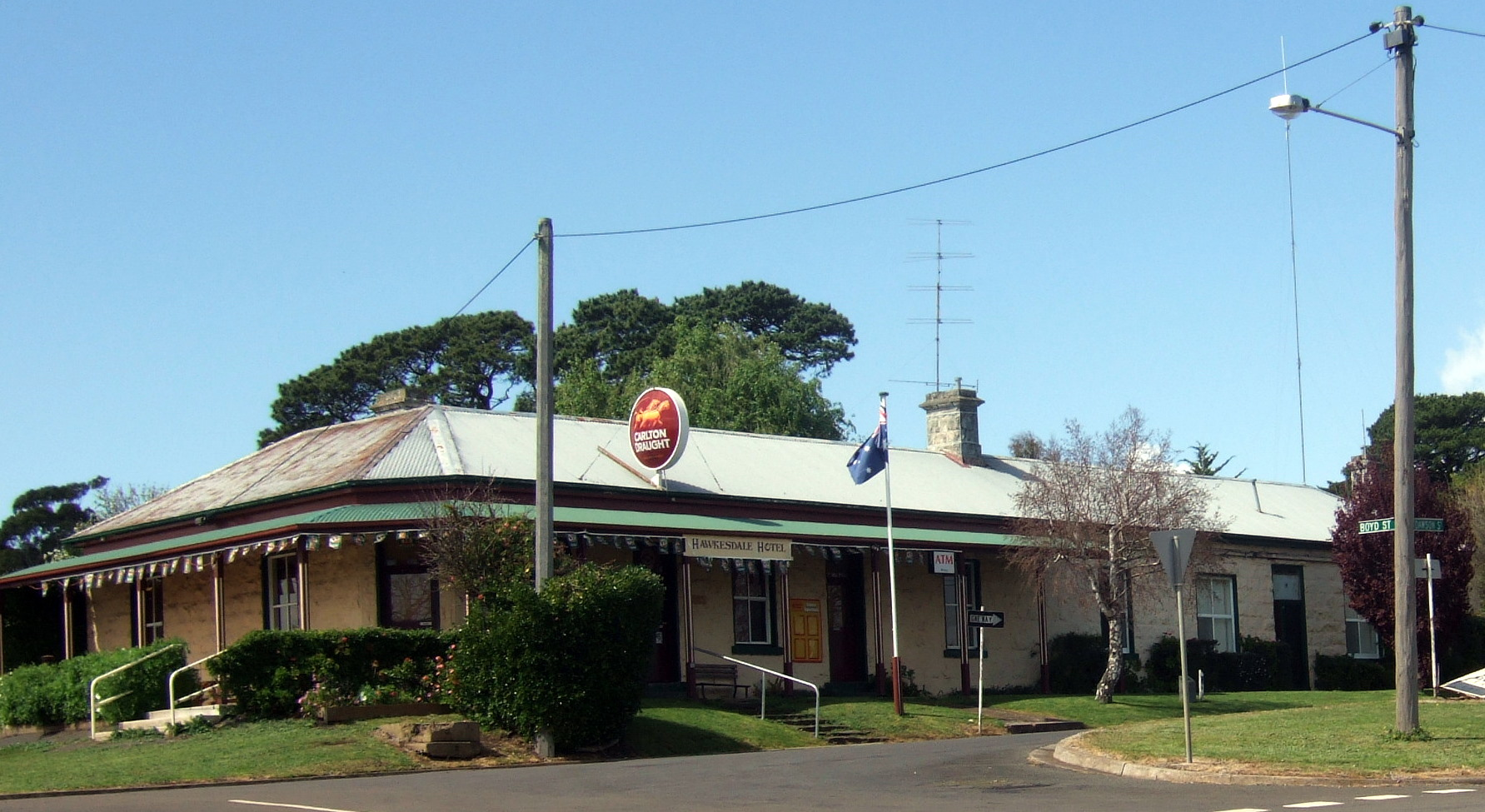
- The Hawkesdale Hotel

- Coordinates: 38°06′S 142°19′E
- Country: Australia
- State: Victoria
- LGA: Shire of Moyne
- Location: 27 km (17 mi) South of Penshurst

Government
  - State electorate: Polwarth
  - Federal division: Wannon

Population
  - Total: 322 (2016 census)
- Postcode: 3287

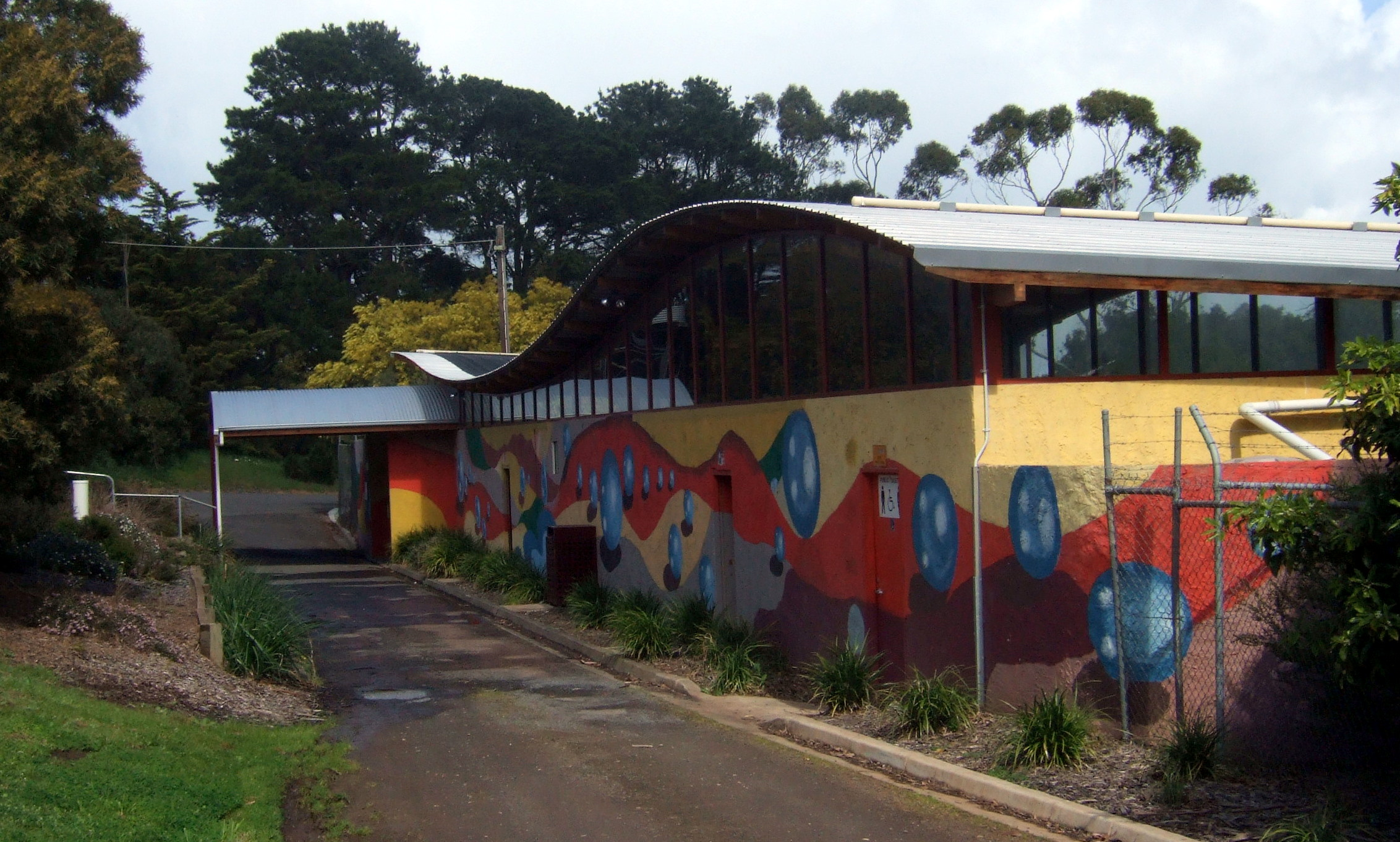
The Hawkesdale Pool.

Hawkesdale /ˈhɔːksdeɪl/ is a town in the Western District of Victoria, Australia on the Penshurst-Warrnambool Road. It is in the Shire of Moyne local government area and the federal Division of Wannon. At the 2016 census, Hawkesdale and the surrounding area had a population of 322.

== History ==
British colonisation of the vicinity began in May 1841 when Robert Whitehead, an English squatter, established a sheep station which he named Spring Creek. Whitehead's overseer reported that there were a large number of Aboriginal huts on the banks of the creek when they first arrived and that they had driven the Aborigines away with gunfire. Conflict over the occupation of the land continued for the next couple of years with flocks of sheep being taken, shepherds speared and Aboriginal people shot. In 1842, Whitehead with two of his employees and several other settlers, shot dead four Aboriginal woman and a child in a gully in what became known as the Lubra Creek massacre. Whitehead temporarily fled the colony to escape punishment but he soon returned and continued to hold the Spring Creek property (which he renamed Goodwood) until his death in 1879.

The Goodwood property of 24,000 acres was subdivided to allow for closer settlement, which included the creation of the towns of Woolsthorpe and Hawkesdale. The first town allotments in Hawkesdale were offered for sale in 1861. Hawkesdale Post Office opened 11 April 1866. The Hawkesdale Hotel was established in 1860.

== Community ==
The town in conjunction with neighbouring township Macarthur has an Australian Rules football team competing in the Mininera & District Football League.

There is an outdoor swimming pool open in the summer months.

Golfers play at the Hawkesdale Golf course.

== See also ==
- Minjah
