= Willaura =

- Town
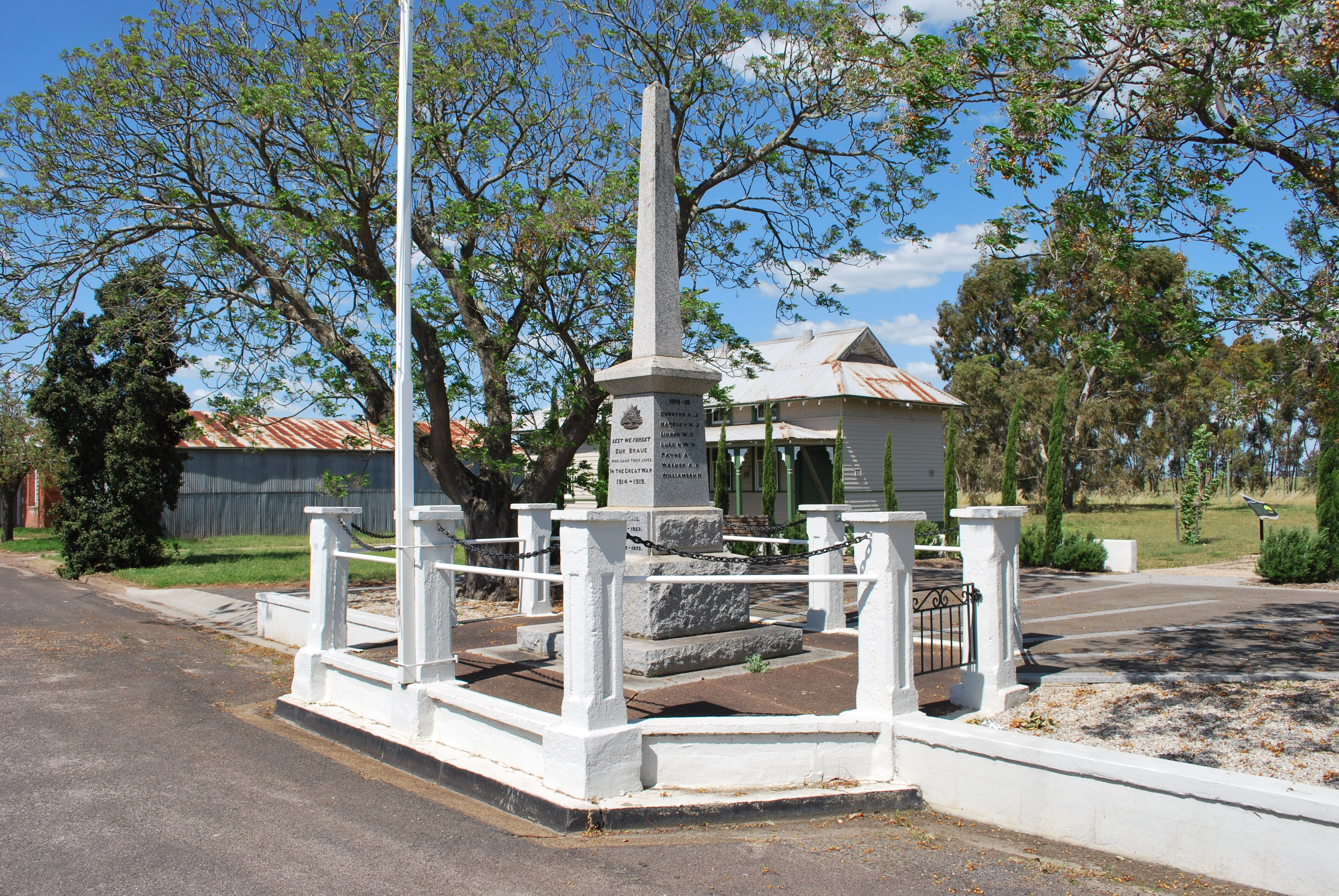
- War memorial on the main street of town

- Coordinates: 37°32′S 142°44′E
- Country: Australia
- State: Victoria
- LGA: Rural City of Ararat
- Location: 231 km (144 mi) W of Melbourne; 116 km (72 mi) W of Ballarat; 36 km (22 mi) S of Ararat

Government
  - State electorate: Lowan
  - Federal division: Wannon

Population
  - Total: 439 (2021 census)
- Postcode: 3379

Willaura is a town in western Victoria, Australia in the Rural City of Ararat local government area, 231 kilometres (144 mi) west of the state capital, Melbourne. At the 2021 census, Willaura and surrounding area had a population of 439.

According to tradition, the town's name is derived from a question, specifically "Will Laura?"

== History ==
In September 1836 Major Thomas Mitchell travelled through the area on his return to Sydney from Portland. He crossed the Hopkins near the Edgarley Bridge, camped at Mount Stavely, journeyed through the salt lakes area, and then camped at Cockajemmy Lakes. He wrote in his journal that "...a land more favorable for Colonization could not be found..." and his trip effectively opened the district for European settlement. A cairn on the Wickliffe road commemorates his journey. The 1862 the Duffy Land Act made blocks available for free selection, and this was taken up enthusiastically around what was then known as Wickliffe Road. The railway came through in 1877, and gold discoveries at Mafeking in June 1900 brought many people to the area. In 1902 sixty tenant farmers were settled on 18,000 acres of Mount William Estate and in 1906 a further 37,000 acres was sold off to small farmers.

In 1902 part of Greenvale was sold as smaller town blocks, and the little settlement of Wickliffe Road, now called Willaura, became a focal point for farming activities in the shire. Crops, particularly wheat, did well in the area. Willaura became an important receival centre for grain, and in 1910 was the second biggest in the western half of Victoria. There were a couple of disastrous fires in the town, one in 1912 and another in 1916, which wiped out many business houses. The town steadily progressed however, and in the 1940s gained momentum with the advent of Soldier Settlement. Parts of Edgarley, Narrapumelap and Burrumbeep were divided for Closer Settlement, and again farming activity boosted the district.

Wickliffe Road Railway Station Post Office opened around January 1878 and was renamed Willaura in 1905.

== Climate ==
Willaura has a temperate climate with warm (sometimes very hot) summers and cool winters with frequent frosts. Rainfall totals around 550 millimetres or 22 inches annually, most of which falls in winter and spring. Average temperatures in summer are a maximum of 28 °C or 82.4 °F and a minimum of 11 °C or 51.8 °F, whilst in winter they are a maximum of 11 °C or 51.8 °F and a minimum of 3 °C or 37.4 °F.

== Sports ==
The town shares an Australian rules football team with nearby Moyston, the Moyston-Willaura Pumas, competing in the Mininera & District Football League. Golfers play at the course of the Willaura Golf Club.

== Notable people ==
- Rose Bygrave (born 1955), singer-songwriter
- Louise Staley (born 1965), politician (Victorian Legislative Assembly)
- Peter Tait (born 1949), sport shooter (2000 Summer Paralympics)

== See also ==
- Mount William Homestead
- Yarram Park
