= Mafeking, Victoria =

Mafeking Victoria
- Coordinates: 37.374027252°S 142.575424194°E
- Population: 20 (2021 census)
- Postcode(s): 3379
- Location: 238 km (148 mi) W of Melbourne; 127 km (79 mi) W of Ballarat; 34 km (21 mi) SW of Ararat
- LGA(s): Rural City of Ararat
- State electorate(s): Lowan
- Federal division(s): Wannon

Mafeking is a locality in the Australian state of Victoria, located south-east of Grampians National Park and 20 km (12 mi) from the nearest town of Willaura.

"In 1900 there was a large rush to the Grampians area south of Mt William, to what became known as the Mafeking rush. In 1897 two splitters named Arthur and David Schache found gold in a gully in the granite area, and told the brothers Philip and Frank Emmett, who were on a shooting trip. The Emmetts returned from the Rocky Point Diggings at Ararat, and stayed with their friends, the Masons. They prospected the area and got the first gold at Masons Falls. On 24th June 1900 they registered a claim, and within a fortnight at the consequent rush, gold had been found in ten gullies. The surveyed town at the rush was called Naram Naram."

"At Mt William (Mafeking) gold derived from granitic rocks intrusive into the Grampians sandstones has been concentrated in gravels of Tertiary age over an area of about a square mile, which have yielded over £100,000 worth of gold. The gold was very fine, and much waterworn. Some of the gravel has been re-concentrated by later streams in shallow deposits. The original gravels vary from 30 to 70 feet (9.1 to 21.3 m) in thickness, and values are confined to the lower layers. Small auriferous quartz veins have been found in the granitic rock, but are too small to pay for mining."

The small goldfield yielded 1t of gold from alluvial deposits and from quartz veinlets in a weathered I-type granite pluton of Devonian age.

Many tektites were found in the alluvial gravels at Mafeking.

There is a winery in the area called Grampians Estate.
