= Thomas Shaw (farmer) =

- Born: 27 August 1827; Birstall, West Yorkshire, England
- Died: 30 July 1907 (aged 79); Hawthorn, Victoria
- Occupations: Pastoralist, sheep breeder, local government leader, community benefactor
- Known for: Fine-wool sheep breeding; agricultural shows; local government leadership
- Spouse: Catherine McLaurin (m. March 1854)
- Relatives: W. H. Fitchett (brother-in-law); Mary Turner Shaw (granddaughter)

Thomas Shaw, junior (27 August 1827 – 30 July 1907) was an English-born Australian pastoralist, noted sheep breeder, local government leader, and community benefactor in colonial Victoria.

== Early life ==
Shaw was born on 27 August 1827 in Birstall, near Leeds in Yorkshire, England, to Thomas Shaw, a wool specialist, and his wife Ann (née Turner). He migrated with his father to Sydney in 1843 and gained early pastoral experience on Robert Campbell’s property, Duntroon. At the age of 20, he droved a herd of 700 cattle overland to Adelaide.

== Pastoral career ==
During the early 1850s, Shaw worked on the Victorian goldfields and as a mounted mail carrier between Cressy and Mortlake. In February 1854, he and his brother-in-law Thomas Anderson—who was married to a sister of Shaw’s wife, Catherine McLaurin—acquired the Wooriwyrite pastoral station. Following Anderson’s death later that year, Shaw became sole manager with financial backing from another brother-in-law, Ebenezer Oliphant, who was also married to a McLaurin sister. Shaw restocked the property with ewes from the Learmonth family and rams from the Macarthur flock of Camden, and by the 1860s and 1870s his wool was highly prized in London markets. He regularly wrote to newspapers advocating careful breeding and fine-wool production, and opposing the Vermont sheep strain for what he considered a degradation of quality. In January 1866, he was described by a correspondent as “pugnacious as a cock-sparrow,” though also praised for his upright character and vitality.

== Public and community service ==
Shaw launched the Skipton agricultural show in 1859, serving as its honorary secretary for over a decade. He was elected the inaugural president of the Shire of Mortlake in 1863 and subsequently served multiple terms on the Shire of Hampden council, including as president. In 1890, he became a founding councillor of what evolved into the Graziers’ Association of Victoria. His other public duties included serving as a justice of the peace, judging sheep at shows, and standing—though unsuccessfully—for parliamentary office on several occasions.

== Personal life and philanthropy ==
In March 1854, Shaw married Catherine McLaurin, whose sisters were connected to other notable local families. He built a home near Mortlake for his mother and sisters; one, Jemima, married Rev. Dr W. H. Fitchett. A lifelong teetotaller, Shaw funded the construction of a Methodist parsonage and donated both a museum and a temperance hall to Mortlake. In 1885 he completed a bluestone homestead for his family, and two years earlier published a travel memoir titled A Victorian in Europe. Known for his modest lifestyle and cheerful character, he sometimes unsettled his household by taking sudden, unexplained trips.

== Death ==
Shaw died on 30 July 1907 in Hawthorn while returning from attending to a friend's affairs in Queensland. The West Gippsland Gazette reported that he remained active until shortly before his death, which followed a brief illness from influenza and heart complications. His funeral in Camperdown was attended by a large number of mourners, including more than eighty horse-drawn vehicles, with the service conducted by Rev. C. S. Ross and his brother-in-law, Rev. Dr W. H. Fitchett. Several prominent figures from the pastoral industry and local government were also present.
