= Mexican cypress =

Mexican cypress is a common name for several plants and may refer to:

- Hesperocyparis lusitanica
- Taxodium mucronatum
