= Yarram Park =

Historic homestead in Victoria, Australia

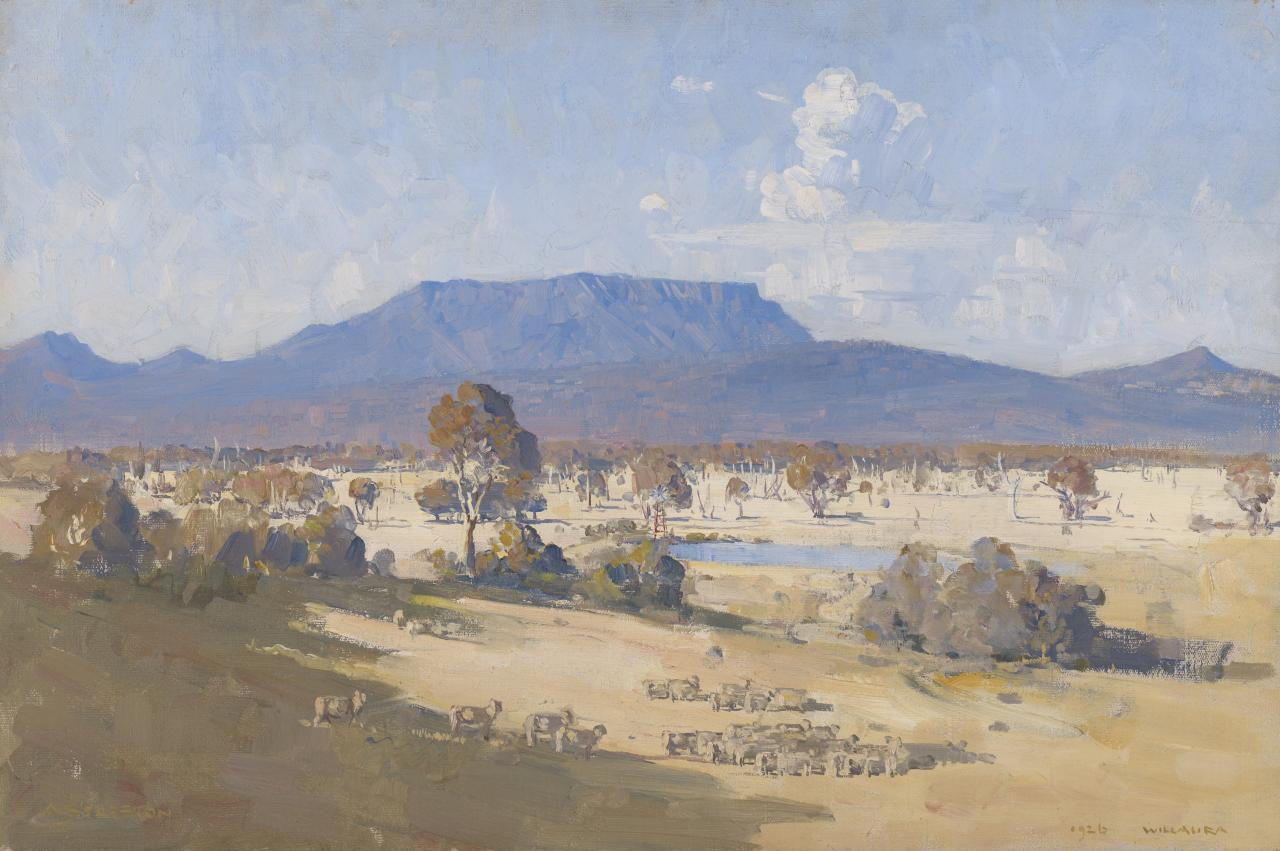
- Land of the Golden Fleece, by Sir Arthur Streeton (1926)

- Location in the Rural City of Ararat, Victoria
- 37°28′38″S 142°32′07″E
- Type: Homestead, associated built facilities and grounds
- Location: Willaura, Victoria, Australia
- Nearest city: Ararat

History
- Built: 1893

Yarram Park is a large pastoral property near Willaura in western Victoria, Australia. Established during the squatting era of the 1840s, it has developed into one of the region's most significant sheep and cattle enterprises. The property is closely associated with the Baillieu family, who have owned it since 1948, and is also notable as the location for Sir Arthur Streeton's celebrated painting The Land of the Golden Fleece. The estate retains its historic homestead, tree-lined entrance avenue and long association with Merino sheep and Hereford cattle breeding.

== History ==
The land that became Yarram Park was first part of the Yarram Yarram run by Robert Muirhead and Edward Parker between 1844 and 1864. Their pastoral lease comprised approximately 32,000 acres (12,900 ha) and carried thousands of sheep during the early decades of European settlement in Victoria's Western District.

In 1864, the property passed to Thomas Robertson, whose family held the station for several decades. Robertson's grazing lands were affected by major bushfires in the 1870s, a recurring challenge for pastoralists throughout the district. Ownership later transferred to Edward Simmons, a successful Stawell businessman whose wealth from the gold-rush era enabled him to acquire several grazing properties. During Simmons' ownership the station became known as Yarram Park, and substantial improvements were undertaken, including construction of the present homestead in 1893 and a new woolshed. Simmons also developed a reputation as a breeder of quality sheep, winning prizes for his livestock at agricultural exhibitions.

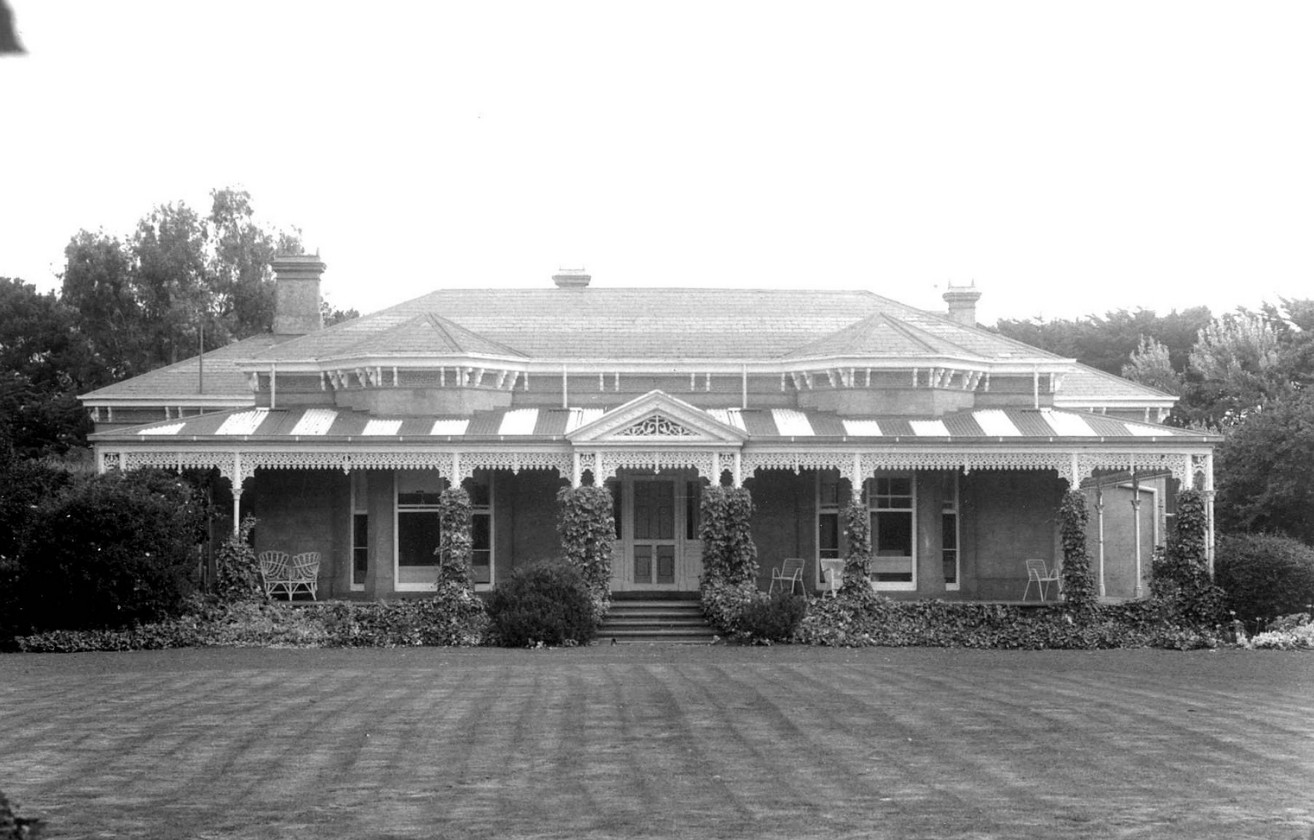
The homestead

In the early twentieth century ownership changed several times. George Hobbs held the property from 1905 until 1907, followed by Sir John Duncan from 1907 to 1914 and Francis Edward Cobbold from 1914 to 1915. In 1915, the estate was acquired by the Cain family, who would retain it for more than three decades. During their tenure, the property became widely recognised for the quality of its Merino wool. Wool merchants Dennys Lascelles reported in 1928 that some of the highest prices of the season were achieved by Yarram Park wool. The Cains also planted the long avenue of English elms and sugar gums that continues to form a prominent approach to the homestead.

The Cain years coincided with several devastating bushfires. The property was affected by the 1926 "Black Sunday" fires and again by the 1939 "Black Friday" fires, which destroyed the station's woolshed. During this period Yarram Park also became associated with the artist Sir Arthur Streeton. In 1926, Streeton visited the property as a guest of Walter Cain and painted views of the surrounding landscape and the Grampians, the resulting work named "Land of the Golden Fleece".

In 1948 the station was purhcased by pastoralist and stockbroker John Baillieu through the Western District Pastoral Company. At the time the property covered approximately 23,000 acres (9,300 ha) and was described as being in poor condition, with declining infrastructure, inadequate water supplies and a severe rabbit infestation. Baillieu embarked upon a major programme of redevelopment, constructing new houses, sheep and cattle yards, fences and dams, while introducing fertiliser and improved pasture species. These initiatives dramatically increased carrying capacity and transformed the productivity of the estate. Sheep numbers reportedly increased sixfold during the following decades, while Hereford and Merino studs were established using carefully selected bloodlines.

The expansion of the enterprise required a substantial workforce. Additional staff housing was constructed and Yarram Park became a significant local employer. Several employees spent decades working on the station, including sheep overseer and manager Jack Frost, who worked for the Baillieu family for more than 60 years, and manager Bob Potter, who played a major role in the property's post-war development.

The property remains in Baillieu family ownership as John Baillieu's son, Antony Baillieu, assumed management during the 1990s and has continued to operate Yarram Park as a large-scale sheep, cattle and cropping enterprise.

== See also ==
- Mount William Homestead
