= Meningoort =

Historic homestead in Victoria, Australia

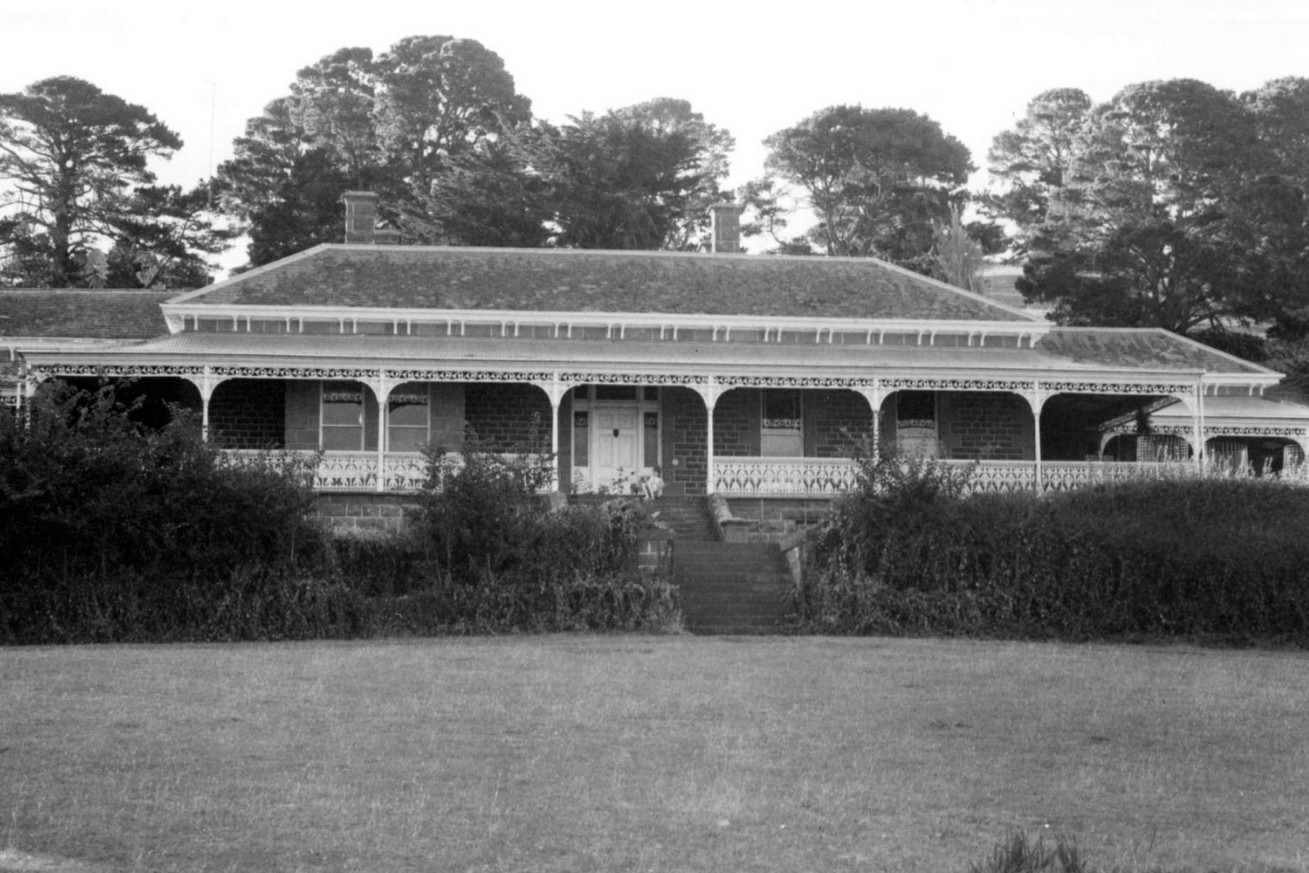
- Meningoort Homestead

- Location in Corangamite Shire, Victoria
- 38°08′05″S 143°04′07″E
- Type: Homestead, associated built facilities and grounds
- Location: Bookaar, Victoria, Australia
- Nearest city: Colac

History
- Built: 1851, 1887 (later additions)
- Built for: Peter McArthur

Site notes
- Architect: Charles D'Ebro
- Architectural style: Italianate

Meningoort is a historic pastoral homestead near Camperdown in the locality of Bookaar, Victoria, Australia. Established as a pastoral run in 1839 by Scottish immigrant Peter McArthur following the subdivision of an earlier partnership with Nicholas Cole, it has remained in continuous ownership by the McArthur family ever since. The bluestone homestead, begun in 1851 and substantially enlarged in 1887, occupies a prominent terrace on the slopes of Mount Meningoort overlooking the surrounding volcanic plains. The property is closely associated with the development of pastoralism in Victoria's Western District and with successive generations of the McArthur family, whose members have played prominent roles in law, politics, agriculture and public life.

== History ==
Peter McArthur was born on the island of Islay, Scotland, in 1819. After joining the clerical staff of Greenock merchants Hoyle Brothers, he emigrated to Australia aboard the Christina, sailing in December 1838. Following an unsuccessful search for suitable grazing country near Maitland, New South Wales, he travelled to Port Phillip in 1839. During the voyage he became acquainted with Nicholas Cole and French immigrant Jean Duverney, and together the three travelled to Geelong, where they purchased sheep from the pioneering Manifold family of Purrumbete before moving west in search of grazing land.

The partners initially occupied country along Mount Emu Creek before settling permanently in November 1839 on land that became known as Meningoort. Duverney soon left the partnership, while McArthur and Cole continued together until 1842, when they amicably divided their holdings. Cole retained the larger portion, later known as West Cloven Hills, comprising approximately 21,000 acres (8,500 ha), while McArthur selected the 13,196-acre (5,340 ha) Meningoort run, believing it to possess better soils and more reliable rainfall. The neighbouring Cole and McArthur families continued to occupy their adjoining properties for generations, up to the present day.

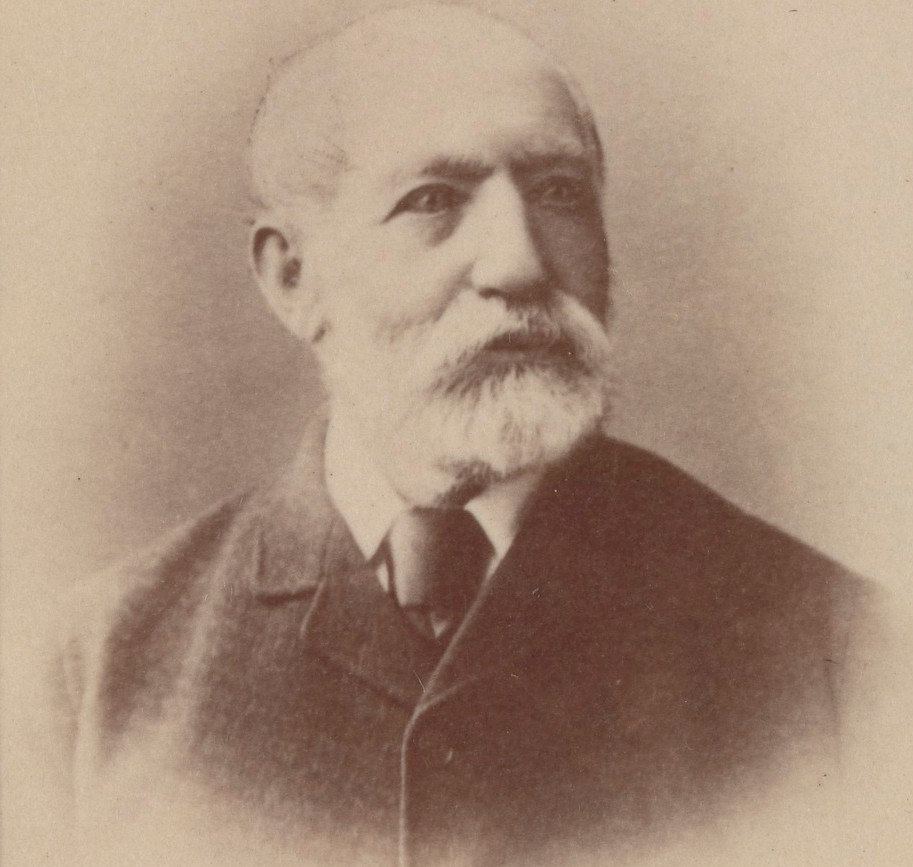
Peter McArthur

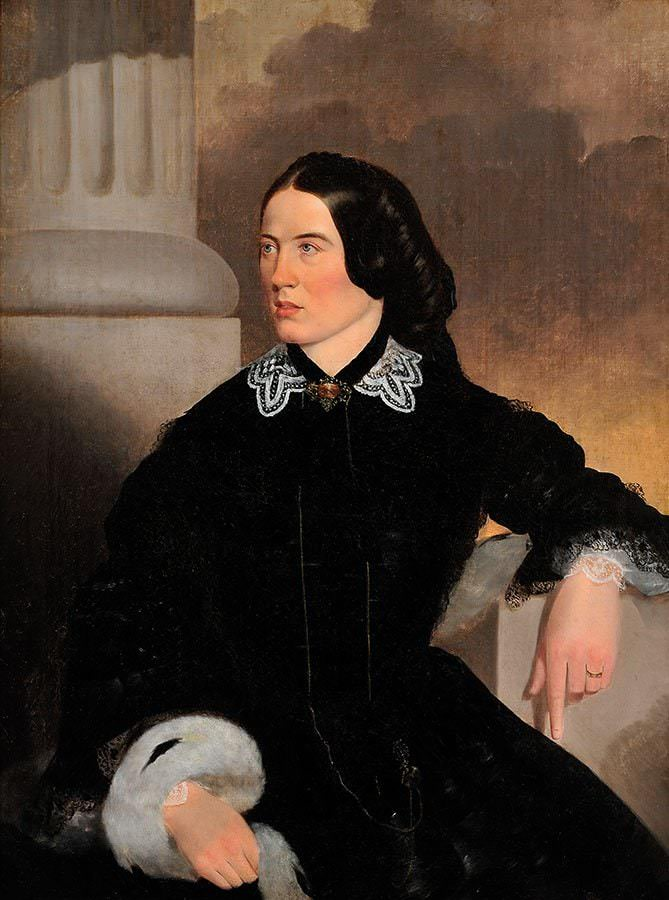
Margaret McArthur

Like many early pastoralists, McArthur faced considerable hardships during the station's formative years. They accrued losses from Aboriginal raids, wild dogs, sheep scab, footrot and the dramatic collapse in sheep values during the early 1840s. The first dwelling at Meningoort was a simple slab hut, while a subsequent house was destroyed by fire soon after its completion.

In 1851 McArthur selected a permanent site for the homestead on a terrace cut into the lower slopes of Mount Meningoort, commanding extensive views across the surrounding volcanic plains towards Mount Leura. A rectangular bluestone residence was constructed that year, and in 1861 the house and its landscaped grounds were depicted by artist Eugene von Guerard. Over subsequent decades McArthur expanded both the property and his pastoral interests, inheriting the neighbouring Lawrenny estate after the death of his brother Gilbert and becoming a partner in the purchase of Glenample near Port Campbell. Following the wreck of the Loch Ard in 1878, survivor Eva Carmichael spent part of her recovery at both Glenample and Meningoort.

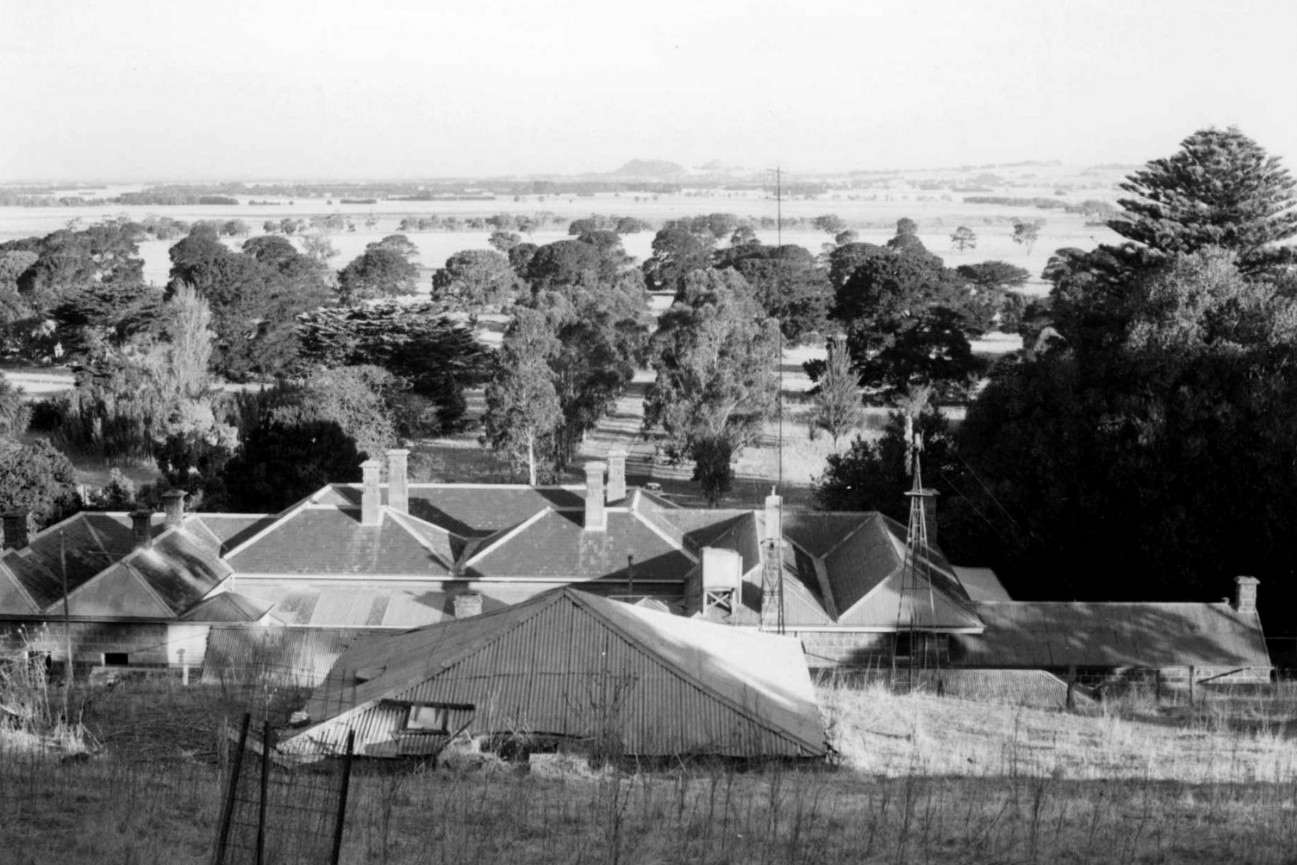
Meningoort Homestead viewed from Mount Meningoort

The present form of the homestead dates largely from an extensive rebuilding completed in 1887. Designed by Melbourne architect Charles D'Ebro, the works retained the original 1851 house but incorporated it within a substantially enlarged Italianate residence. New side wings enclosed a central courtyard, while extensive accommodation was provided for family members and domestic staff. Associated bluestone service buildings, including a billiard room, dairy, schoolroom, servants' quarters, stables and woolshed, formed part of a substantial pastoral complex. In 1903 D'Ebro later used Meningoort as an example in a lecture on the design of Australian country houses, particularly praising its practical domestic planning.

In 1894 Christina Macpherson, sister-in-law of the McArthur family, stayed at Meningoort after attending the Warrnambool races. There she played on the homestead piano a Scottish melody she had heard during the meeting. After returning to Queensland she collaborated with Banjo Paterson in setting that tune to words, producing the song that became known as Waltzing Matilda.

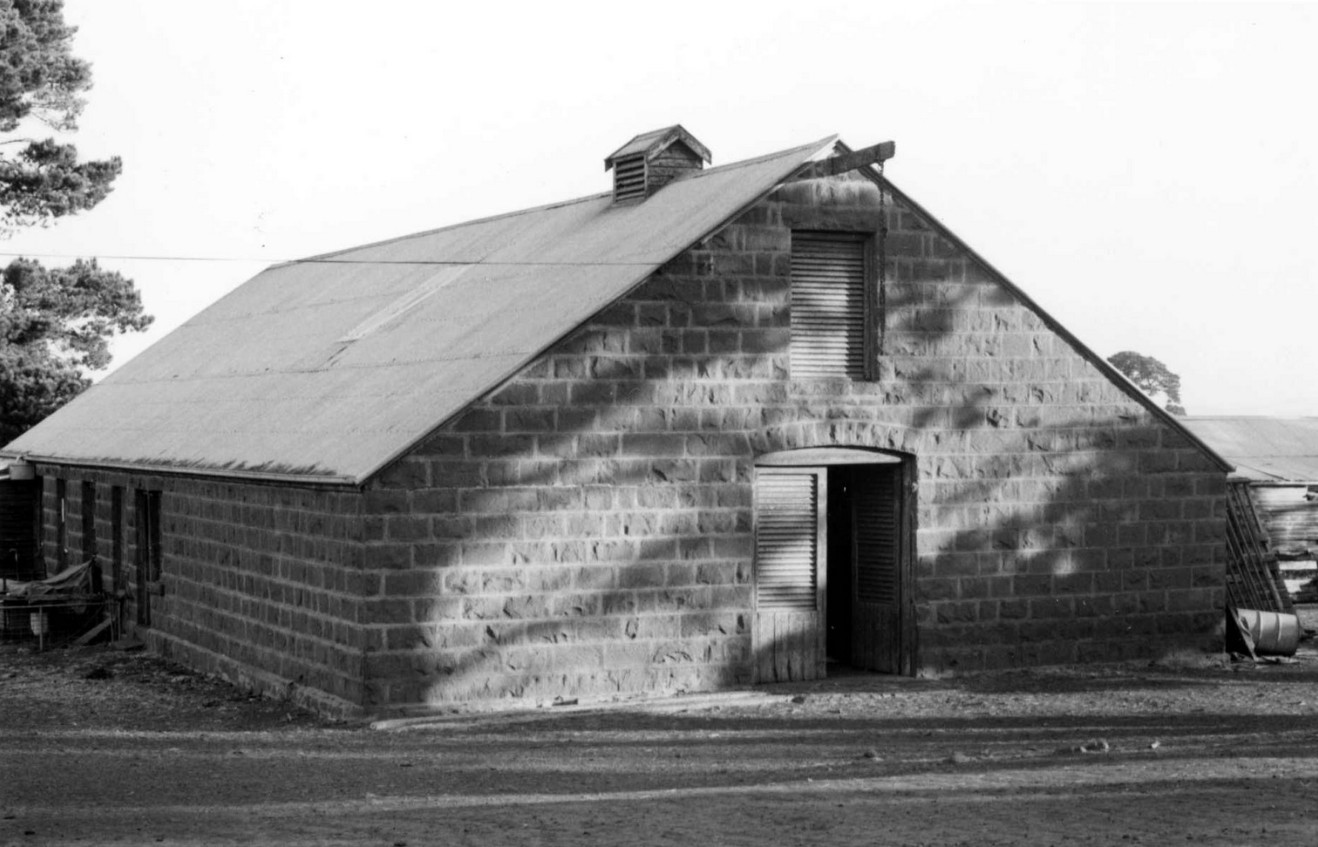
The woolshed

Peter McArthur married twice and had 11 children. By the time of his death in 1897 Meningoort had expanded to approximately 12,000 acres (4,860 ha). His estate was divided, with the northern 6,000-acre (2,430 ha) section, including the homestead, passing to his eldest son John Neil McArthur, while the southern half was divided among his remaining children.

John Neil McArthur developed Meningoort into one of western Victoria's leading pastoral and racing establishments. A noted horseman, athlete and politician, he represented the Villiers and Heytesbury electorate in the Victorian Legislative Assembly between 1896 and 1900 and constructed the Meningoort racing stables in 1903. He died in 1917 without children and with considerable debts, after which the homestead passed to his younger brother Sir William Gilbert Stewart McArthur, a barrister who had been appointed to the Supreme Court of Victoria in 1920 and was knighted in 1935.

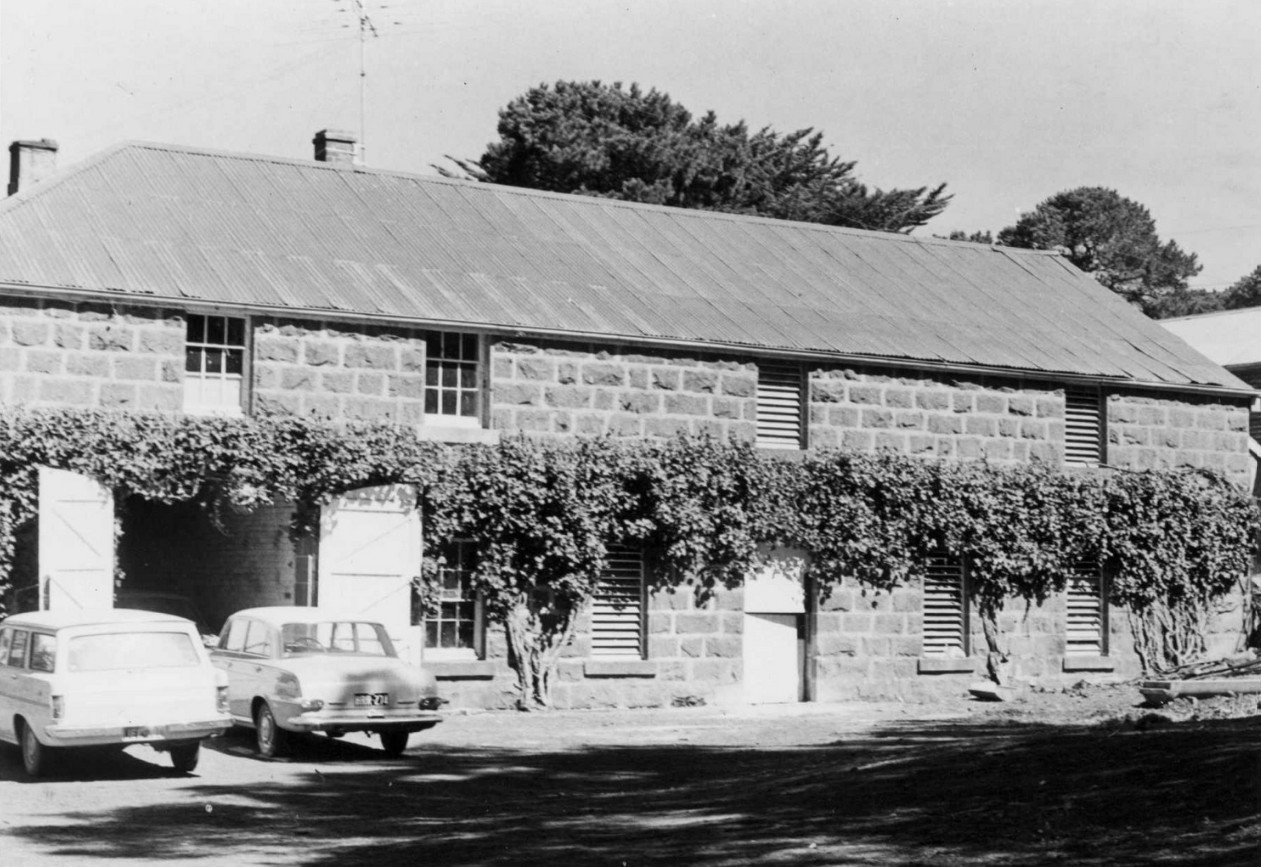
Part of the homestead

Following Sir Stewart McArthur's death in 1935, Meningoort was inherited by his son Sir Gordon Stewart McArthur. A veteran of the First World War, Gordon had lost a leg during the Battle of Menin Road near Ypres in 1917 before returning to complete his studies at Jesus College, Cambridge, where he rowed for the colleged crew. Admitted to the Victorian Bar in 1929, he also embarked on a lengthy political career, serving in the Victorian Legislative Council for more than three decades and later becoming a minister in the Bolte Government. He was knighted in 1958. Alongside his public career he continued to manage Meningoort as a major wool-growing property, breeding Corriedale sheep and racehorses, including Chiquita, runner-up in the 1950 Melbourne Cup.

John Neil McArthur

Sir William Gilbert Stewart McArthur

Gordon Stewart McArthur

By the early 1940s the estate comprised approximately 5,700 acres (2,300 ha), carrying around 12,000 Corriedale sheep together with fattening cattle. Improvements to pasture, fencing and stock management maintained Meningoort as a productive Western District grazing property.

Following Sir Gordon McArthur's death in 1965, Meningoort was operated by his sons Stewart, Jock and Alistair McArthur as a family enterprise. Electricity was connected to the homestead that year, while the property itself remained largely unchanged in size at approximately 5,700 acres (2,300 ha). Between 1996 and 2010 the grazing country was leased to neighbouring farmers while Stewart McArthur served as the federal member for Corangamite. In 2008 Alistair McArthur sold his share of the property to his brothers, continuing the family's long association with the estate.

Andrew McArthur, son of Stewart McArthur, was killed in 2018 after being struck by a car whilst cycling in Paddington, a suburb of Sydney.

== See also ==
- Eeyeuk
- Koort Koort Nong
- Purrumbete
- Talindert
- West Cloven Hills
- The Geelong College
