= Yalla-Y-Poora =

Historic homestead in Victoria, Australia

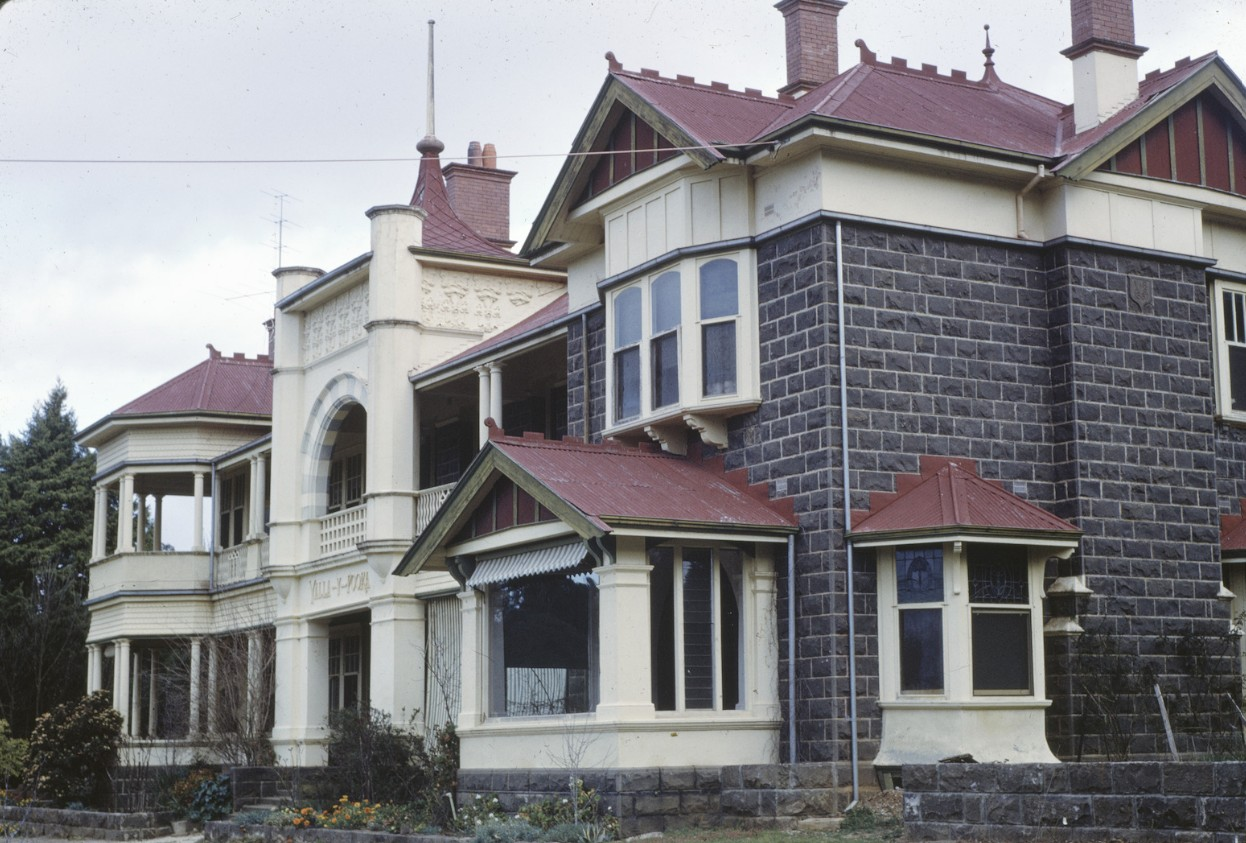
- Yalla-Y-Poora, 1967

- Location in the Rural City of Ararat, Victoria
- 37°29′27″S 143°03′54″E
- Type: Homestead, associated built facilities and grounds
- Location: Tatyoon, Victoria, Australia
- Nearest city: Ararat

History
- Built: 1905

Site notes
- Architectural style: Federation

Victorian Heritage Register
- Official name: Yalla-Y-Poora
- Type: State heritage (built and natural)
- Designated: 29 October 1969
- Reference no.: B1110

Yalla-Y-Poora is a historic pastoral property and homestead near Tatyoon, Victoria, Australia. Established as a sheep station in the early 1840s, it became one of the principal pastoral estates of Victoria's Western District under the ownership of the Ware family. The property is notable for its surviving complex of bluestone station buildings and its association with the pastoral development of the region. The property is listed by the National Trust of Australia (Victoria).

== History ==
The Yalla=Y-Poora run was established in 1841 when squatters Stevens and Thomson took up approximately 66,000 acres (27,000 ha) of grazing land on Fiery Creek in Victoria's Western District. The name is believed to derive from a local Aboriginal term meaning "trees by water". During the early years of settlement, the property developed into a substantial sheep station serving the rapidly expanding wool industry of colonial Victoria.

In 1854, the run was acquired by James Austin, who sold it two years later to Jeremiah Ware and his brothers John and Joseph Ware. Under the Ware family's ownership, Yalla-Y-Poora expanded into one of the district's most successful pastoral enterprises. At its peak the estate carried approximately 60,000 sheep and became renowned for wool production and merino breeding. The family's holdings extended beyond Yalla-Y-Poora to other Western District properties, including Minjah.

A substantial bluestone homestead and associated station buildings were erected during the 1850s and 1860s. These included a manager's residence, coach house, stables, blacksmith, and shearing facilities, many of which survive.

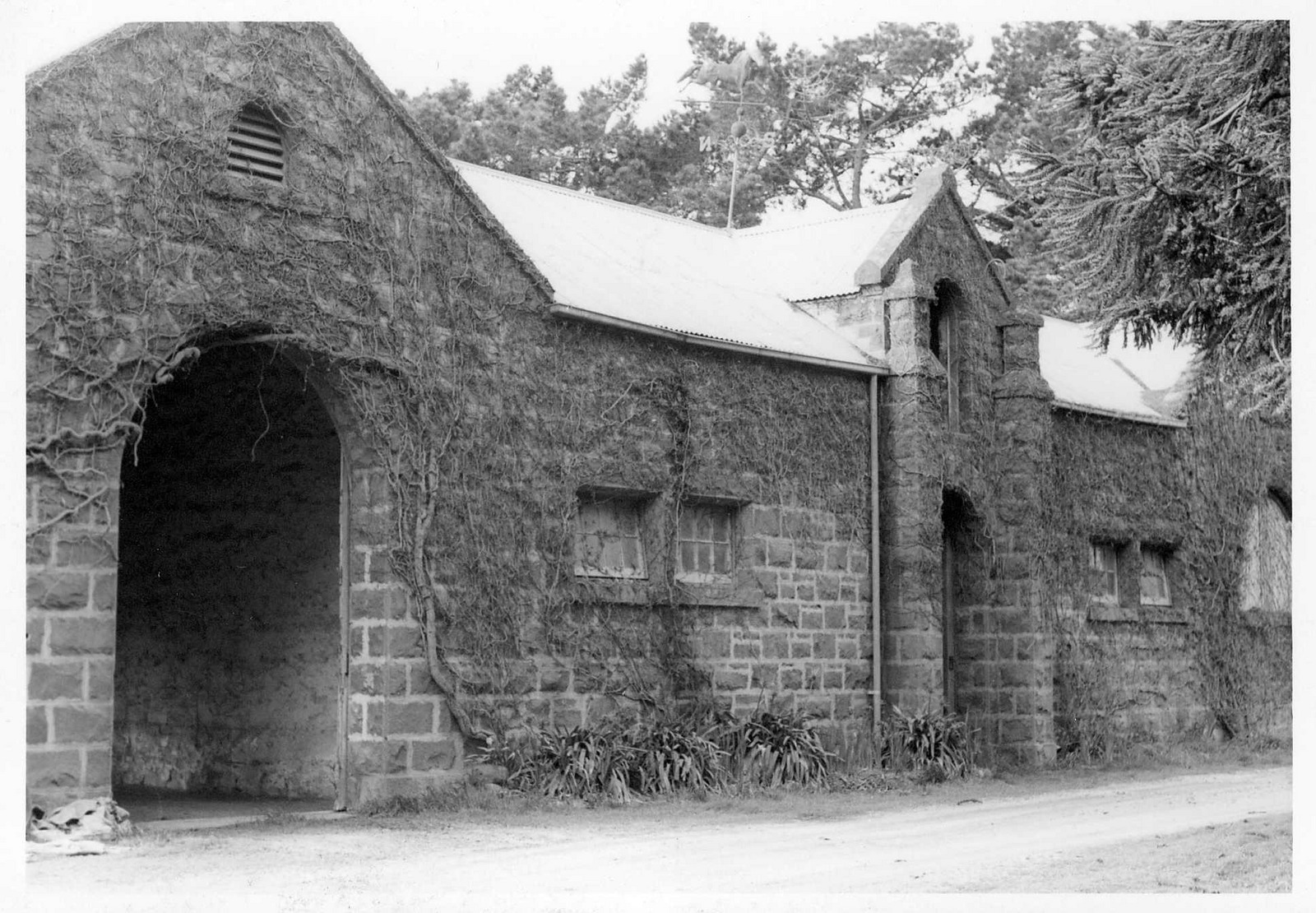
Yalla-Y-Poora coach house and stables

In 1864, the Austrian-born artist Eugene von Guérard visited the property and painted "Yalla-y-Poora". The work is held by the National Gallery of Victoria.

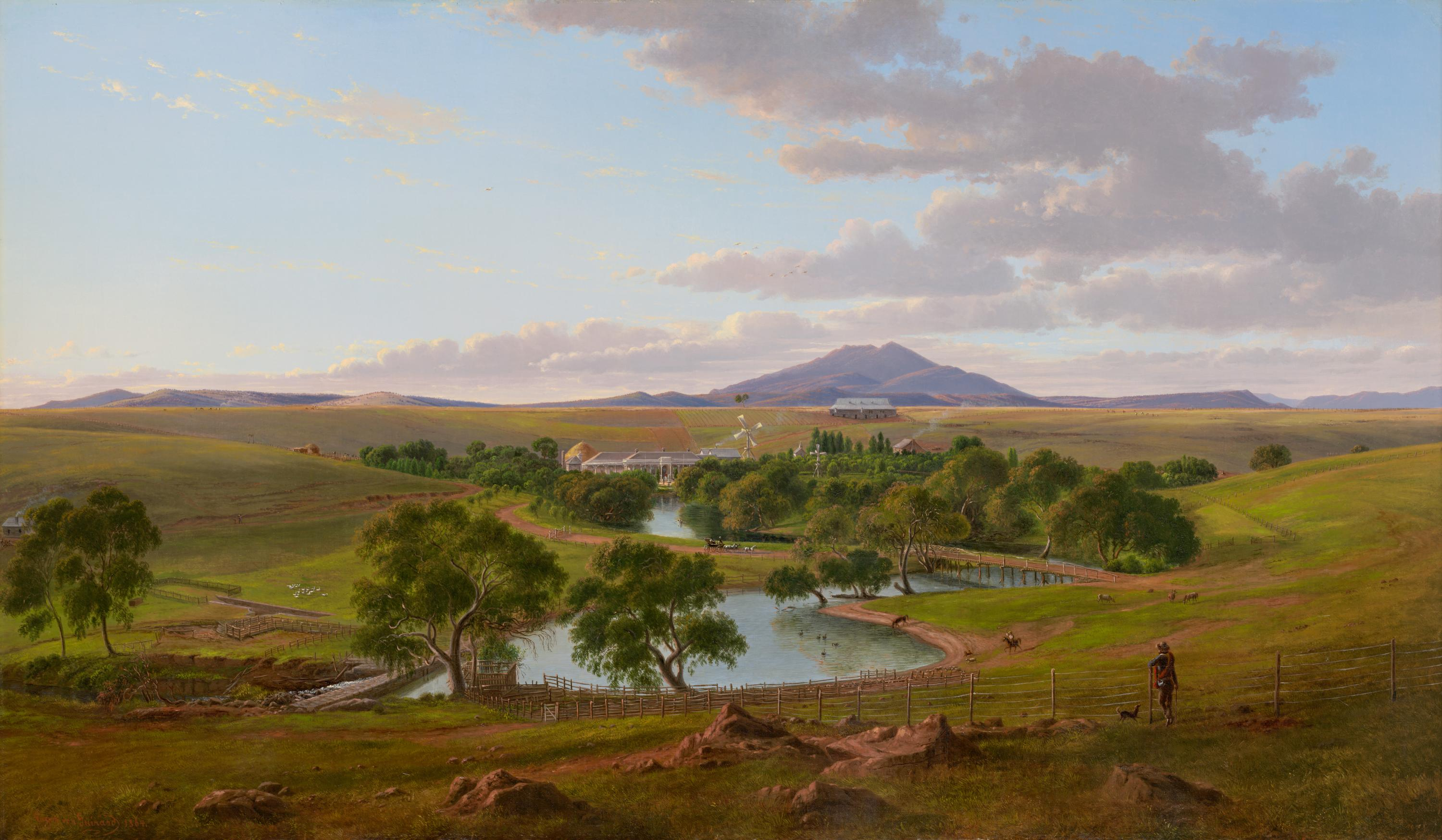
Yalla-y-Poora (1864)

The original homestead depicted by von Guérard was later demolished after suffering from persistent rising damp and possible flooding associated with Fiery Creek. In 1905, a new bluestone mansion was constructed nearby. Designed in a Federation Free Style with Victorian and Gothic influences, the replacement residence incorporated materials recovered from the earlier house and became the principal homestead of the estate.

Throughout the late nineteenth and early twentieth centuries, the Yalla-Y-Poora estate was gradually reduced in size through land selection, taxation measures and the subdivision of land for soldier settlement following both world wars. Despite these reductions, the property maintained a reputation as a leading grazing enterprise and achieved distinction in wool production, with wool from the station setting an Australian auction record in 1924.

The Ware family retained ownership of Yalla-Y-Poora for more than a century before financial difficulties led to the sale of the property in the 1960s. Subsequent owners continued pastoral operations while undertaking conservation work on the historic buildings. The house has since been under the ownership of the Fraser family, and since 2019, Tim and Jane Fraser.

== See also ==
- Blythvale
- Minjah
- Carranballac Homestead
