= Wooriwyrite =

Historic homestead in Victoria, Australia

- Wooriwyrite Homestead

- Location in Moyne Shire, Victoria
- 38°05′00″S 142°59′31″E
- Type: Homestead, associated built facilities and grounds
- Location: Kolora, Victoria, Australia
- Nearest city: Warrnambool

History
- Built: 1883
- Built for: Thomas Shaw

Site notes
- Architect: Alexander Hamilton
- Architectural style: Italianate

Wooriwyrite is a historic pastoral property and homestead on Mount Emu Creek near Noorat in western Victoria, Australia. Established as a pastoral run during the 1840s, it became particularly associated with the Shaw family, under whom Wooriwyrite developed into a prominent fine-wool Merino stud. The present homestead, a large two-storey bluestone mansion of approximately 30 rooms, was built for pastoralist Thomas Shaw in 1883 to a design by Colac architect Alexander Hamilton. Constructed during the Western District's nineteenth-century pastoral prosperity, the Victorian Italianate residence is among the largest historic homesteads in the region and retains much of its original interior. Its grounds also incorporate a garden originally laid out by William Guilfoyle.

== History ==
Wooriwyrite was first occupied as a pastoral run around 1843 by John G. Ware, one of the early pastoralists of the Western District. Ware subsequently exchanged the property with neighbouring pastoralist Ebenezer Oliphant of Koort Koort Nong, after which Wooriwyrite became associated with the partnership of Oliphant and McLaurin. The initials "E. O.", derived from Ebenezer Oliphant, were retained as the identifying brand of the Wooriwyrite sheep stud long after his ownership had ended.

The figure most closely associated with the development of Wooriwyrite was English-born pastoralist Thomas Shaw. Shaw arrived in the district around the time of the Black Thursday bushfires of 1851 and was initially engaged in horse breaking. He was appointed manager of Wooriwyrite for its owners and married a daughter of McLaurin, one of the partners in the property. Shaw acquired an ownership interest in Wooriwyrite in 1854 and later became its sole proprietor, with the title being transferred to him by Oliphant during the 1860s.

Under Shaw, Wooriwyrite became an important centre of fine-wool production. In 1854 he introduced Camden Merinos from New South Wales and established a breeding program based upon this bloodline. The flock was maintained and refined over subsequent decades, eventually giving Wooriwyrite a prominent position within the Western District's Merino industry. By the 1880s it was regarded as one of the leading Merino breeding establishments in western Victoria.

The pastoral enterprise experienced periodic setbacks from the region's severe fire conditions. In February 1879 a fire broke out on Shaw's Wooriwyrite property. A much more destructive event occurred in January 1905, when a major bushfire travelled rapidly through pastoral country between Chatsworth and Camperdown. Wooriwyrite was among the worst-affected stations, with more than 100 miles of fencing being destroyed, approximately 25,000 acres of pasture burnt and an estimated 8,000 to 10,000 sheep lost. The fire, at one stage, moved 8 miles (12.9 km) in only 22 minutes, leaving extensive stretches of neighbouring pastoral country without surviving fences.

The earlier Wooriwyrite residence dated from the late 1840s. At the height of the nineteenth-century wool economy, Thomas Shaw replaced it with the present homestead in 1883. The new residence was designed by Alexander Hamilton, a self-trained architect based at Colac, and was conceived on a scale reflecting both the success of Wooriwyrite and Shaw's standing as a pastoralist.

Constructed from squared and regularly-coursed local basalt, the building incorporates carefully worked stone quoins and window surrounds and an elaborate single-storey iron verandah. Its restrained but imposing exterior contrasts with richly finished internal spaces, many of which retain their nineteenth-century decorative treatment. The surrounding garden was laid out by prominent landscape designer William Guilfoyle.

Wooriwyrite remained with the Shaw family for several generations. In 1911, Turner Shaw and Oliphant Shaw assumed control of the estate, while G. McKay was appointed studmaster and general manager. Turner Shaw later withdrew from the partnership, leaving Oliphant Shaw to continue the property and its Merino stud. The family's association with Wooriwyrite lasted for approximately 69 years.

The homestead was also the childhood home of Mary Turner Shaw, born in 1906, who later became an architect and architectural historian. Shaw grew up in the homestead surrounded by artworks and objects collected by her family, including sketches of the district and its homesteads by artist Eugene von Guerard. Her upbringing on the working station and exposure to its architecture and collections formed part of the environment in which her later interest in architectural history developed.

In 1923, the Shaw family sold the approximately 20,000-acre Wooriwyrite Estate to Thomas McKellar and C. B. Palmer. The property subsequently came into the Morrison family, whose association with Wooriwyrite dates from 1928. Merino breeding continued under their ownership. In 1953, for example, the Wooriwyrite Stud, then belonging to the estate of J. R. Morrison of Terang, entered five rams and three ewes for exhibition at the Royal Melbourne Show. The Morrison family continue to live at the property to the present.

== See also ==
- Meningoort
- Stony Point
