= Koort Koort Nong =

Historic homestead in Victoria, Australia

- Koort Koort Nong Homestead

- Location in Corangamite Shire, Victoria
- 38°06′37″S 143°07′26″E
- Type: Homestead, associated built facilities and grounds
- Location: Bookaar, Victoria, Australia
- Nearest city: Colac

History
- Built: 1850s
- Built for: John G. Ware

Site notes
- Architectural style: Colonial

Koort Koort Nong (also spelt Kort Kort Nong, Koort Koortnong, and Koort Koort-Nong) is a historic pastoral property and homestead near Camperdown in western Victoria, Australia. Established during the first decades of European pastoral settlement in the district, the property was initially associated with pastoralist John G. Ware and later passed through the Chirnside and Manifold families before undergoing substantial subdivision during the early twentieth century. The homestead was in existence by the late 1850s, when the property was depicted by colonial landscape artist Eugene von Guerard, and formed the centre of what became a large sheep-grazing estate extending over thousands of hectares of country north of Camperdown.

== History ==
The Koort Koort Nong pastoral run was taken up by John G. Ware during the 1840s, making it one of the earlier pastoral properties established around Camperdown. Ware remained associated with Koort Koort Nong for several decades, during which it developed into a substantial sheep station. The property adjoined the lakes and volcanic country of the area and ultimately extended almost to the township itself.

A homestead had been established at Koort Koort Nong by the late 1850s, when Eugene von Guerard depicted the property during his travels through the Western District. The existence of the developed homestead by this period suggest that its principal early buildings dated from the first decades of Ware's occupation.

Koort Koort-nong homestead, near Camperdown, Victoria (1860)

Koort Koort-nong homestead, near Camperdown, Victoria, with Mount Elephant in the distance (1860)

Koort Koort Nong operated as a sizeable pastoral enterprise under Ware. By the 1870s it employed a residence manager and other station workers. In 1877, manager B. Dowling gave evidence in a trespassing case involving a man who had repeatedly entered the estate to shoot around the lake and later crossed the property with a horse, cart and firearm. The case resulted in a fine.

Ware retained Koort Koort Nong until the later nineteenth century. In 1887 the estate was acquired by Andrew Spence Chirnside, a member of the prominent Western District pastoral family. Under Chirnside, Koort Koort Nong was managed in conjunction with his nearby Mount Elephant Estate. By 1895 the property comprised approximately 24,000 acres, with its southern boundary extending close to Camperdown.

Like many large Western District stations, Koort Koort Nong was periodically affected by bushfire. In February 1891 a fire broke out in one of its paddocks but was brought under control after burning approximately 50 to 60 acres of grass and about three-quarters of a mile of fencing.

The station supported a considerable resident workforce during the Chirnside period. In 1896, Koort Koort Nong became the setting of a widely reported death when the station cook, Henry Thomas Batty, aged 37, died by suicide near the men's hut. Evidence at the subsequent magisterial inquiry indicated that Batty had worked as a cook on the estate for around 5 or 6 years and prepared meals for a group of station employees. His body was discovered by Andrew S. Chirnside after Batty failed to appear during the working day. The inquiry determined that his death resulted from a self-inflicted wound.

Chirnside sold Koort Koort Nong in 1899 through Camperdown agents John Thornton & Co. to Manifold Bros., another of the major pastoral families of the Western District. At the time of this sale, the estate comprised approximately 17,300 acres, most of which was described as sheep-grazing country. The reduction from the 24,000 acres four years earlier suggests that parts of the larger holding had already been separated or otherwise disposed of before the Manifold purchase.

An outbuilding at Koort Koort Nong

An unusual archaeological discovery occurred on the estate in 1913. While ploughing at Koort Koort Nong, a worker uncovered the remains of an Aboriginal person, with the arrangement of the bones indicating a seated burial. The skull was accidentally damaged by the plough during the discovery.

The breakup of the large pastoral estate accelerated after the First World War as land was made available for closer settlement. In June 1921, approximately 950 acres of Koort Koort Nong were sold for soldier settlement, and later that year 16 blocks from the estate were allotted as part of a broader closer-settlement scheme.

The surviving Koort Koort Nong property was acquired by John Tapp in October 1928, shortly after his reutrn from a visit to England. Tapp remained there until his sudden death in 1930, aged 56. He collapsed while helping load hay onto a motor lorry at another of his properties at Bostocks Creek and died before medical assistance arrived.

Koort Koort Nong continued to be associated with the Tapp family after his death. Norman Tapp subsequently managed the estate, and references to members of the family at Koort Koort Nong continued through the 1940s and 1950s. By 1952 Norman Tapp was still working the property and allowed part of it to be used by the nearby Bookaar Tennis Club for a community bonfire. The homestead presently remains intact.

== See also ==
- Meningoort
- West Cloven Hills
