= Wimmera Football League =

Australian rules football league

- Sport: Australian rules football / Netball
- Founded: 1937; 89 years ago
- CEO: Jennie French
- COO: Chloe Haughton
- President: Bart Turgoose
- No. of teams: 9
- Country: Australia
- Most recent champion: Nhill (2026)
- Most titles: Horsham Demons (26)
- Sponsor: Priceline Pharmacy
- Website: "Gameday" Wimmera FL

The Wimmera Football League is a major Australian rules country league based in Western Victoria, with clubs located in towns in the Wimmera region: the regional centres along the Western Highway from Ararat to Nhill as well as Minyip-Murtoa and Warracknabeal.

== History ==
Australian Rules Football appears to of commenced in the Wimmera region in the early 1870s and a combined Wimmera team played a match against Carlton on the East Melbourne Cricket Ground in front of a couple of thousand people in June 1879.

A Wimmera Football Association was first formed in 1902, with teams from Ararat, Horsham and Stawell as the founding clubs.

When Ararat won the 1912 premiership, the winning team was presented with 20 combination sets of a jam spoon, bread fork and a butter knife.

Collingwood (11.10 - 76) defeated Wimmera DFA (8.13 - 61) at Stawell in August 1913.

The 1915 season commenced, but was abandoned in July due to player shortages from enlistments into the Australian Armed Forces.

In 1920 the Wimmera District Football League was reformed and played for the May Cup. The four clubs involved in 1920 were Ararat, Horsham, Murtoa, Stawell. Dimboola joined in 1923 and Nhill in 1925; Ararat spent six years in the Ballarat Football League from 1924 to 1929.

Many Wimmera FL club's actively sought the services of VFL players in the 1920s, who were offered more money in country football than what they were earning from their VFL clubs, such as Roy Cazaly who was captain-coach of Minyip in 1925.

In 1926, the Victorian Football League played the Wimmera Football League at Horsham, with the VFL side defeating Wimmera by three points in heavy conditions.

The Wimmera FL defeated the Gippsland FL in 1928 at the Melbourne Cricket Ground, led by captain-coach, Artie Wood.

In August 1929, Perth defeated the Wimmera FL in a match at Stawell.

In 1930, the Wimmera FL defeated Essendon in heavy conditions at Ararat with many former VFL players representing the Wimmera FL in the 1930s.

In June 1930, the Wimmera FL (19.17 - 131) defeated the Western District FA (19.10 - 124) at Hamilton, with Dimboola's Jimmy Lawson kicking ten goals.

In 1932, during the height of the Great Depression, the small town clubs were suffering from financial pressures, and tried to get the league to change the way the gate taking were distributed to the clubs. The larger town clubs, knowing that they would be disadvantaged, blocked the motion. Subsequently, Nhill and Dimboola both went into recess while Minyip and Murtoa replaced their junior sides in the Dunmunkle FL.

In 1931, Stawell's Horrie Hunt kicked 105 goals for the season.

The WDFL approached the Ballarat Football League to merge hoping that greater interest and better football would cause larger gate takings, so in January 1934 the Wimmera FL and the Ballarat FL merged to form the Ballarat Wimmera FL. After three years, in which the Wimmera clubs faced with greater costs and were constantly losing on the field, feelers were put out to the smaller clubs, now playing in the Mid Wimmera FL. A peace deal was settled in September 1936 and the Wimmera Football League was reformed in February 1937 at the Annual General Meeting with Mr. P J Toohey elected as president and a nine team competition was formed.

The Wimmera FL went into recess between 1941 and 1943 due to World War Two, but football in the Wimmera was revived in 1944 with a competition that involved six teams.

In 1945, Dimboola and Warracknabeal joined the Wimmera Football Association, which formed a six team competition.

In 1946 Rupanyup Football Club joined the Wimmera FL and that made it a ten team competition.

John Ledwidge was captain-coach of the Bendigo Football League representative team that won the 1962 VCFL Caltex Country Football Championships by defeating the Wimmera Football League at Horsham.

As a ten team competition the league remain stable until Rupanyip decided the level of football was too hard for them and they opted to drop to the local district competition in 1981. The numbers returned to ten when local district club Imperials-Wonwondah joined in 1983. After fifty fruitless years Jeparit Football Club decided to try their luck in the South Mallee FL from 1990.

St Michaels from the district competition joined in 1993. Founding clubs Minyip and Murtoa decided to merge in 1995.

2000 saw local Horsham clubs change their names, St Michaels became Horsham Saints and Imperials-Wonwondah became the Horsham Diggers.

Horsham Diggers later merged with Natimuk FNC under the banner Natimuk United at the start of 2014; following an exodus of players in the 2008 pre-season, the Diggers had struggled on and off-field, and had won three matches in the previous four seasons. The merged club plays home games at Natimuk and City Oval.

Southern Mallee transferred from the Horsham District Football League in 2018 after dominating the competition.

Following the 2023 season Southern Mallee merged with Jeparit Rainbow from the Horsham District Football League to form the Southern Mallee Thunder.

== Club Locations ==
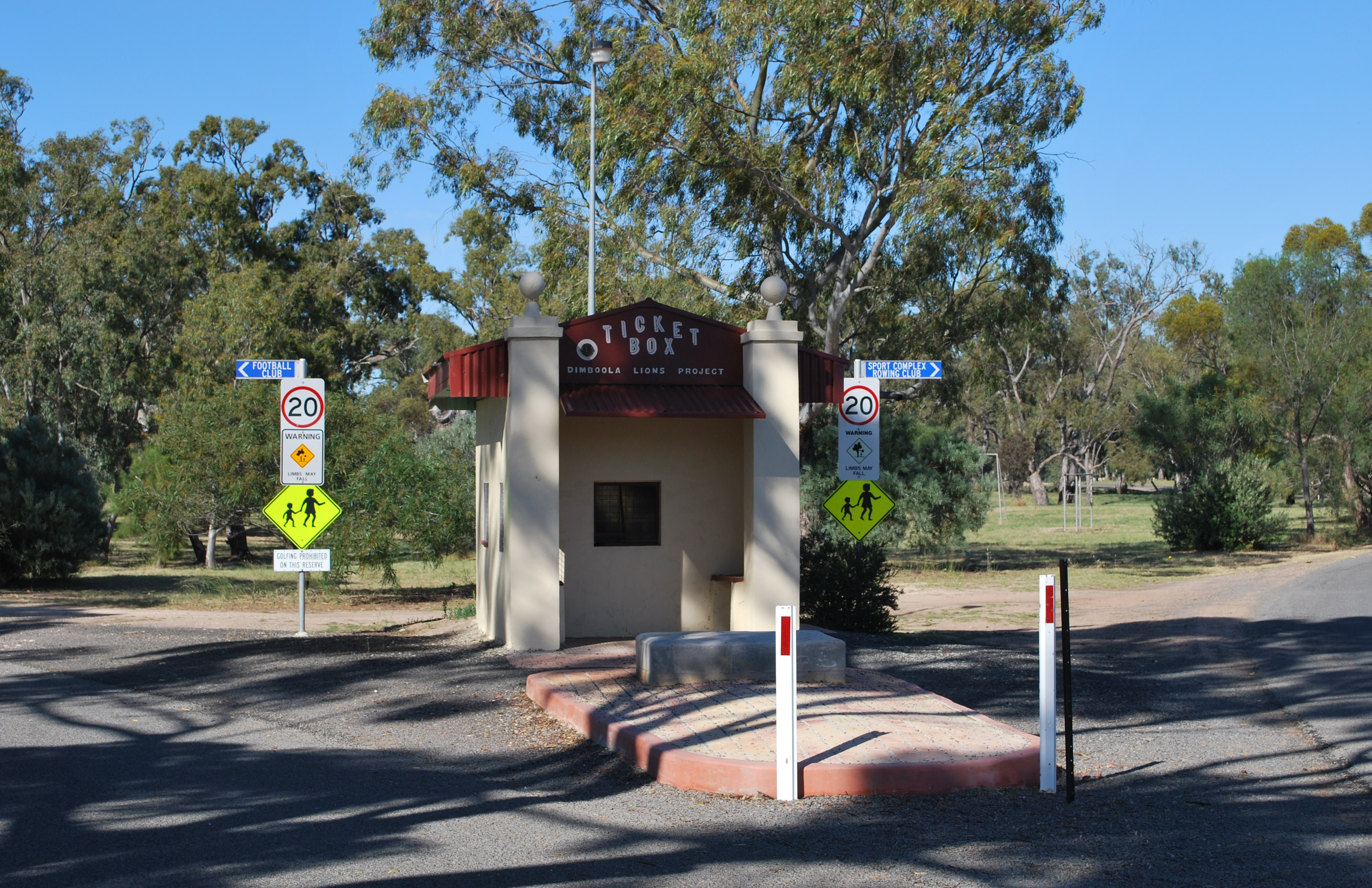
Dimboola Recreation Reserve Entrance

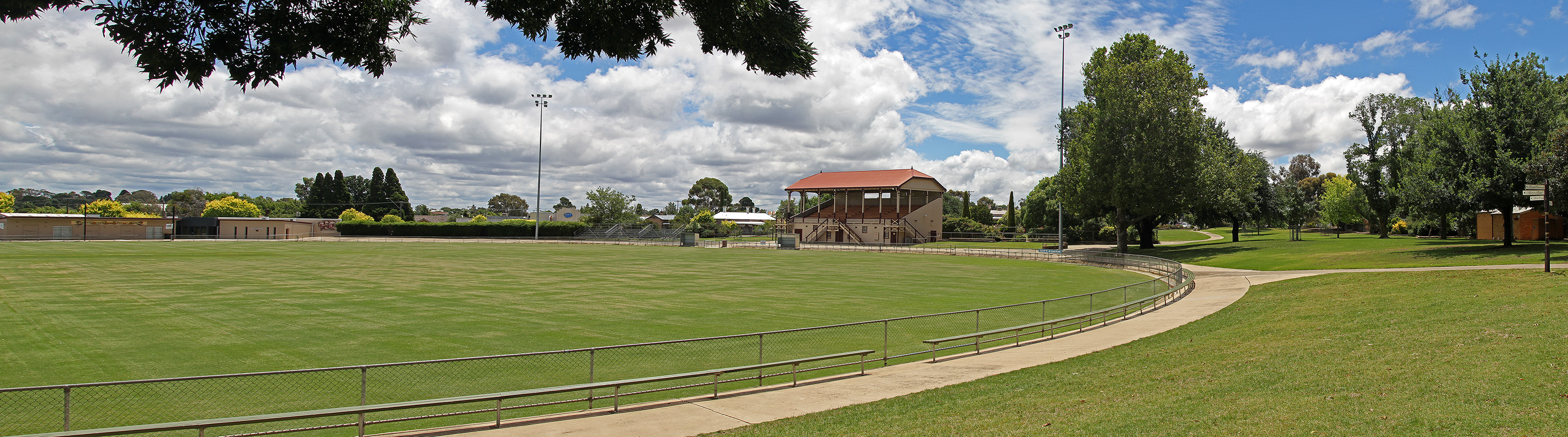
Central Park, Stawell, Victoria

Locations of the 2025 Wimmera FL clubs. Coloured pogs represent teams with multiple home grounds: orange for Minyip-Murtoa, yellow for Warrack Eagles, cyan for Southern Mallee

== Current Clubs ==
Club	Colours	Nickname	Home ground	Former League	Est.	Years in WFNL	WFNL Senior Premierships	
Club	Colours	Nickname	Home ground	Former League	Est.	Years in WFNL	Total	Years
Ararat		Rats	Alexandra Oval, Ararat	BFL	1871	1937–	14	1949, 1951, 1955, 1956, 1957, 1958, 1971, 1975, 1986, 1999, 2001, 2023, 2024, 2025
Dimboola		Roos	Dimboola Recreation Reserve, Dimboola	MWFL	1880s	1937–	5	1937, 1946, 1959, 1985, 2013
Horsham		Demons	Horsham City Oval, Horsham	BFL	1876	1937–	26	1938, 1960, 1962, 1967, 1968, 1970, 1972, 1974, 1976, 1979, 1982, 1983, 1989, 1990, 2003, 2004, 2005, 2006, 2007, 2008, 2009, 2010, 2011, 2012, 2014, 2017, 2018
Horsham Saints (St Michaels 1993-99)		Saints	Coughlin Park, Horsham	HDFNL	1945	1993–	2	2015, 2016
Minyip-Murtoa		Burras	Minyip Recreation Reserve, Minyip and Murtoa Recreation Reserve, Murtoa	–	1994	1995–	5	1996, 1997, 1998, 2019, 2022
Nhill		Tigers	Davis Park, Nhill	MWFL	1880s	1937–	5	1964, 1965, 1969, 1981, 2026
Southern Mallee		Thunder	Beulah Memorial Park, Beulah; Hopetoun Recreation Reserve, Hopetoun; Sir Robert Menzies Park; Jeparit, Rainbow Recreation Reserve, Rainbow	–	2023	2024–	0	-
Stawell		Warriors	Central Reserve, Stawell	BFL	1874	1937–	8	1939, 1940, 1948, 1950, 1978, 1987, 1995, 2000
Warrack Eagles		Eagles	Anzac Park, Warracknabeal and Brim Recreation Reserve, Brim	–	2000	2001–	1	2002

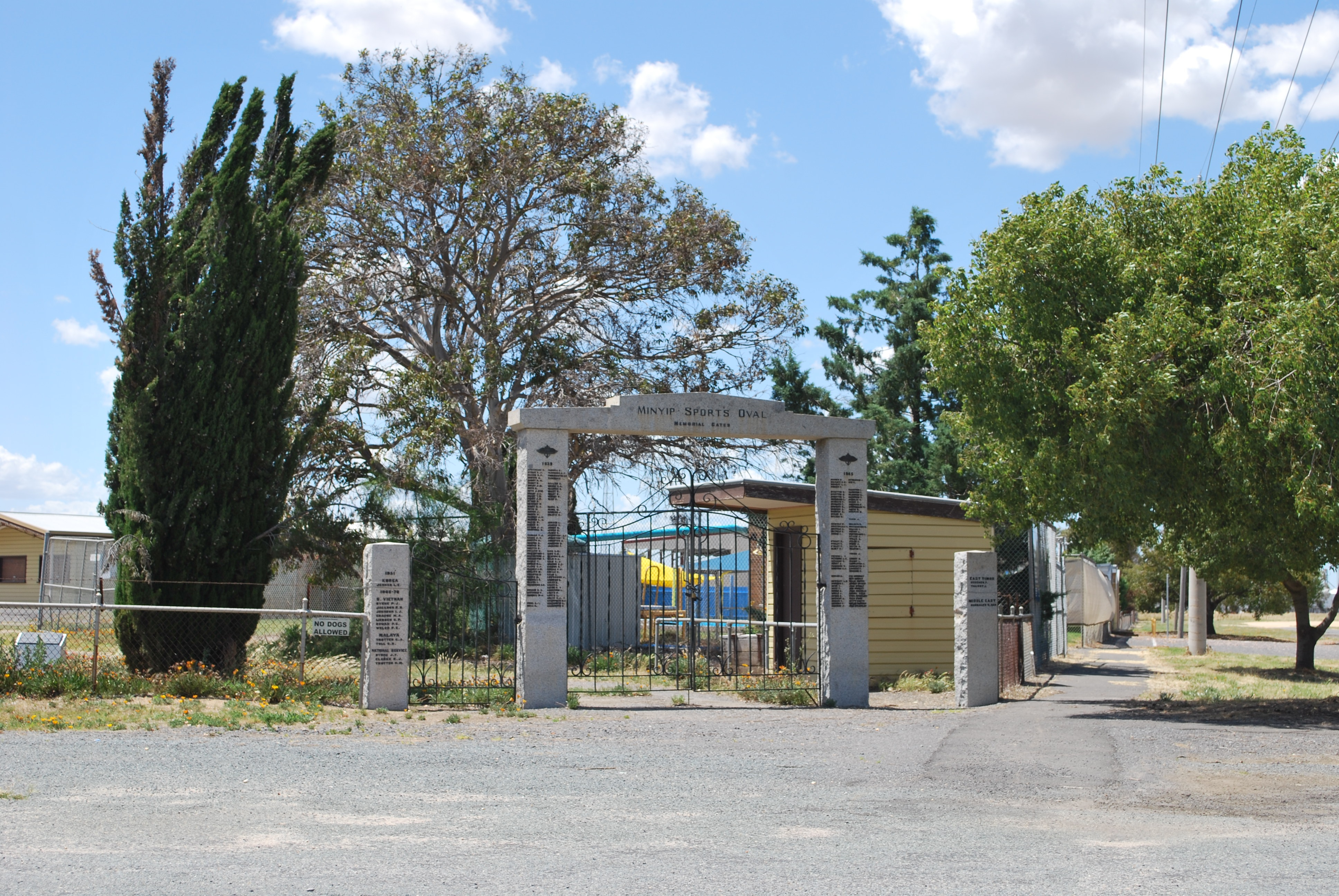
Minyip Sports Oval: Memorial Gates

== Former clubs ==
Club	Colours	Nickname	Home ground	Former League	Est.	Years in WFNL	WFNL Senior Premierships		Fate
Club	Colours	Nickname	Home ground	Former League	Est.	Years in WFNL	Total	Years	Fate
Horsham Diggers (Imperials-Wonwondah 1983-85, Horsham United 1986-2002)		Diggers	Horsham City Oval, Horsham	HDFNL	1976	1983–2013	1	1988	Merged with Natimuk to form Natimuk United in Horsham & District FL in 2014
Jeparit		Redbacks	Sir Robert Menzies Park, Jeparit	MWFL	1899	1937–1989	0	-	Moved to Southern Mallee FL in 1990
Minyip		Blues	Minyip Recreation Reserve, Minyip	MWFL	1875	1937-1994	6	1952, 1954, 1984, 1991, 1992, 1993	Merged with Murtoa to form Minyip-Murtoa in 1995
Murtoa		Magpies	Murtoa Recreation Reserve, Murtoa	MWFL	1880s	1937-1994	1	1980	Merged with Minyip to form Minyip-Murtoa in 1995
Rupanyup		Panthers	Rupanyup Recreation Reserve, Rupanyup	CWFL	1880s	1946–1980	3	1961, 1963, 1973	Moved to Horsham & District FL in 1981
Southern Mallee Giants		Giants	Beulah Memorial Park, Beulah and Hopetoun Recreation Reserve, Hopetoun	HDFNL	2015	2018-2023	0	-	Merged with Jeparit-Rainbow to form Southern Mallee Thunder after 2023 season
Warracknabeal		Lions	Anzac Park, Warracknabeal	BFL	1870's	1937-2000	5	1947, 1953, 1966, 1977, 1994	Merged with Brim to form Warrack Eagles following 2000 season

== Senior Football Grand Finals ==
The best on ground award in the Wimmera FNL senior football grand final receives the Greg Binns Memorial Award, which was first awarded in 1990. Greg passed away in 1987 from a rare blood disease, aged 27 years old. Greg and the Binns family have had a very long association with football in the Wimmera and the Binns family were associated with the Jeparit FNC.

Year	Premiers	Score	Runners up	Score	Best on Ground	Coach	Venue	Gate	Comments
Wimmera District FA
1902	Stawell								
1903	Ararat								Sparks Trophy
1904	Ararat								Dierger Trophy
1905	Ararat								
1906	Horsham		2nd: Ararat			Jim Anderson			H H Barrett Trophy
1907	Horsham	3.10 - 28	Ararat	0.6 - 6		Jim Anderson	Horsham	£18	
1908	Ararat					Austin "Whelan" Carroll			
1909	Stawell								
1910	Stawell								
1911	Ararat	7.17 - 59	Horsham	2.14 - 26		Austin "Whelan" Carroll			Oliver Trophy
1912	Ararat	7.13 - 55	Murtoa	6.9 - 45		Austin "Whelan" Carroll			
1913	Horsham	6.11 - 47	Ararat	5.7 - 37		Jim Anderson	Stawell		
1914	Ararat	12.12 - 84	Horsham	8.8 - 56		Austin "Whelan" Carroll			
1915	Rd.1: 29/5/15								Season abandoned > WW1
1916-18									In recess > WW1
1920	Ararat	6.13 - 49	Stawell	4.8 - 40		Austin "Whelan" Carroll	Horsham		May Trophy
1921	Warracknabeal	14.9 - 93	Horsham	6.15 - 51		Billy Schmidt	Murtoa	£171	
1922	Minyip	8.6 - 54	Warracknabeal	7.11 - 53		Ted Power	Stawell		
1923	Warracknabeal	4.14 - 38	Stawell	2.6 - 18		Pat Kenealy	Minyip		
1924	Horsham	12.9 - 81	Warracknabeal	10.15 - 75		Len Gale	Murtoa	£537	
1925	Stawell	13.10 - 88	Horsham	10.13 - 73		Bill Walton	Murtoa		
1926	Stawell	10.19 - 79	Warracknabeal	7.15 - 57		Jack Bisset	Murtoa	£485	
1927	Warracknabeal	10.7 - 67	Dimboola	8.15 - 63		Arne Caust	Murtoa		
1928	Dimboola	9.16 - 70	Horsham	8.11 - 59		Leo Wescott	Murtoa	£602	
1929	Dimboola	9.9 - 63	Nhill	5.13 - 43		Bert Rankin	Warracknabeal		
1930	Stawell	13.10 - 88	Dimboola	11.18 - 84		Arthur "Steve" Hart	Murtoa	£490	
1931	Stawell	18.15 - 123	Ararat	10.16 - 76		Arthur "Steve" Hart	Horsham	£276	
1932	Horsham	15.15 - 105	Ararat	13.9 - 87		Artie Wood	Stawell	£333	
1933	Stawell	12.11 - 83	Ararat	11.12 - 78		Arthur "Steve" Hart	Stawell	£150	
Ballarat Wimmera FL
1934	South Ballarat	15.21 - 111	Horsham	8.5 - 53		Clem Morden	Stawell	£190	
1935	Ballarat Imperial	14.8 - 92	Golden Point	9.19 - 73		Jack Wunhym	Ballarat	£316	
1936	Ballarat Imperial	15.9 - 99	Ballarat	9.9 - 63		Jack Wunhym	Nhill		
Wimmera FL
1937	Dimboola	15.14 - 104	Stawell	13.15 - 93		Alan Arthur	Horsham	£530	
1938	Horsham	8.27 - 75	Stawell	5.7 - 37		Jack Beveridge	Dimboola	£524	
1939	Stawell	13.21 - 99	Nhill	8.20 - 68		Les Hughson	Horsham	£420	
1940	Stawell	7.12 - 54	Dimboola	5.15 - 45		Les Hughson	Horsham	£93	
1941-43									In recess > WW2
Wimmera FA
1944	Nhill - RAAF	7.11 - 53	Horsham	7.10 - 52	Wally Wollermann (H)		Jeparit	£26	
1945	Warracknabeal	7.18 - 60	Dimboola	4.10 - 34			Dimboola	£125	
Wimmera FL
1946	Dimboola	17.16 - 118	Warracknabeal	10.13 - 73		Keith Smith	Horsham	£675	
1947	Warracknabeal	18.20 - 128	Dimboola	10.9 - 69		Tom Arklay	Horsham	£920	
1948	Stawell	16.14 - 110	Minyip	11.14 - 80		Neil Jeffrey	Horsham	£1073	
1949	Ararat	12.12 - 84	Stawell	6.12 - 48		Clen Denning	Horsham		
1950	Stawell	14.15 - 99	Ararat	11.14 - 80		Percy Bushby	Horsham		
1951	Ararat	7.9 - 51	Minyip	5.9 - 39		Ron Jory	Horsham		
1952	Minyip	11.12 - 78	Warracknabeal	9.14 - 68		Ken Roberts	Horsham		
1953	Warracknabeal	16.12 - 108	Minyip	11.15 - 81		Max Currie	Horsham		
1954	Minyip	?.? - 72	Jeparit	7.12 - 54		Ken Roberts	Horsham		
1955	Ararat	14.16 - 100	Horsham	11.19 - 75		Percy Bushby	Horsham		
1956	Ararat	12.9 - 81	Minyip	10.8 - 68		Percy Bushby	Horsham		
1957	Ararat	12.14 - 86	Horsham	3.17 - 35		Percy Bushby	Stawell		
1958	Ararat	12.20 - 92	Dimboola	7.11 - 53		Percy Bushby	Horsham		
1959	Dimboola	7.12 - 54	Warracknabeal	7.11 - 53		Doug Thomas	Horsham		
1960	Horsham	8.15 - 63	Stawell	5.7 - 37		Colin Wilson	Dimboola		
1961	Rupanyup	18.5 - 113	Stawell	7.13 - 55		Mick Sibun	Horsham		
1962	Horsham	11.21 - 87	Warracknabeal	7.8 - 50		Colin Wilson	Dimboola		
1963	Rupanyup	10.13 - 73	Nhill	8.6 - 54		Mick Sibun	Horsham		
1964	Nhill	7.8 - 50	Ararat	6.14 - 50			Horsham		Drawn Grand Final
	Nhill	10.10 - 70	Ararat	9.14 - 68		Wes Richardson	Horsham		Grand Final Replay
1965	Nhill	10.13 - 73	Warracknabeal	8.11 - 59		Wes Richardson	Horsham		
1966	Warracknabeal	14.15 - 99	Stawell	11.6 - 72		Russell Crow	Horsham		
1967	Horsham	13.11 - 89	Stawell	9.5 - 59		Gary Hamer	Dimboola		
1968	Horsham	8.9 - 57	Stawell	6.17 - 53		Gary Hamer	Warracknabeal		
1969	Nhill	15.10 - 100	Stawell	12.15 - 87		Kevin McNamee	Horsham		
1970	Horsham	17.18 - 120	Warracknabeal	14.13 - 97		Wes Richardson	Stawell		
1971	Ararat	16.12 - 108	Warracknabeal	6.11 - 47		Kevin Tassell	Horsham		
1972	Horsham	24.22 - 166	Ararat	13.14 - 92		Kevin Dellar	Warracknabeal		
1973	Rupanyup	16.16 - 112	Murtoa	11.14 - 80			Horsham		
1974	Horsham	15.10 - 100	Ararat	8.6 - 54		Glen Pope	Horsham		
1975	Ararat	19.19 - 121	Stawell	13.13 - 91		Wilf Dickeson	Horsham		
1976	Horsham	15.18 - 108	Warracknabeal	15.7 - 97		Daryl Griffiths	Dimboola		
1977	Warracknabeal	19.24 - 138	Murtoa	13.8 - 86		Max Carman	Dimboola		
1978	Stawell	14.17 - 101	Horsham	12.13 - 85		Barry Capuano	Warracknabeal		
1979	Horsham	24.14 - 158	Murtoa	18.16 - 124		Peter Morrison	Dimboola		
1980	Murtoa	17.22 - 124	Stawell	9.15 - 69		Hugh Delahunty	Dimboola		
1981	Nhill	15.12 - 102	Horsham	15.8 - 98		Phil Dennis	Warracknabeal		
1982	Horsham	22.15 - 147	Dimboola	16.13 - 109		Peter Morrison	Warracknabeal		
1983	Horsham	24.14 - 158	Dimboola	11.8 - 74		Peter Light	Warracknabeal		
1984	Minyip	15.10 - 100	Horsham	6.16 - 52		G Dax/G Kerr	Warracknabeal		
1985	Dimboola	11.14 - 80	Horsham	9.12 - 66			Warracknabeal		
1986	Ararat	23.12 - 150	Horsham	20.17 - 137		Gary Todd	Warracknabeal		
1987	Stawell	15/15 - 105	Horsham	14.11 - 95		Tony Beck	Dimboola		
1988	Horsham United	18.5 - 113	Warracknabeal	15.10 - 100		Phil Bunn	Dimboola		
1989	Horsham	23.18 - 156	Ararat	16.9 - 105	Greg Binns Medal	Peter Hickmott	Dimboola		
1990	Horsham	23.22 - 160	Warracknabeal	7.12 - 54	Scott Batchelor (H)	Peter Hickmott	Dimboola		
1991	Minyip	10.14 - 74	Stawell	2.8 - 20	Paul Byrne (M)	Ronnie Wearmouth	Horsham		
1992	Minyip	20.14 - 134	Warracknabeal	8.5 - 53	Shane Drum (M)	Ronnie Wearmouth	Horsham		
1993	Minyip	20.15 - 135	Ararat	11.18 - 84	John Hoyker (M)	B Petering	Warracknabeal		
1994	Warracknabeal		Horsham United		Gerard Bibby (W)	Gerard Bibby	Horsham		
1995	Stawell	17.8 - 110	Horsham United	16.11 - 107	Andrew Bach (S)	Noel Jacobs	Horsham		
1996	Minyip-Murtoa	17.13 - 115	Stawell	11.9 - 75	Leigh Funke (MM)	John Harvey	Dimboola		
1997	Minyip-Murtoa	25.17 - 167	St. Michaels	17.9 - 111	Paul Byrne (MM)	John Harvey	Horsham		
1998	Minyip-Murtoa	10.10 - 70	St. Michaels	6.10 - 46	Matthew Hopkin (MM)	Paul Baker	Horsham		
1999	Ararat	16.19 - 115	Minyip-Mortoa	10.5 - 65	Brad Keilar (A)	David Jennings/Shane Hitchcock	Horsham		
2000	Stawell	19.11 - 125	Ararat	16.19 - 115	Simon Dunn (S)	Murray Emerson	Horsham		
2001	Ararat	16.18 - 114	Horsham Saints	17.10 - 112	Bernard Ward (HS)	David Jennings	Dimboola		
2002	Warrack Eagles	12.31 - 103	Ararat	13.10 - 88	Fraser Quick (WE)	Matt Walder	Horsham		
2003	Horsham	14.16 - 100	Stawell	11.9 - 75	Trent Leslie	Guy Smith	Warracknabeal		
2004	Horsham	12.10 - 82	Horsham Saints	11.10 - 76	Aaron Barnett	Guy Smith	Horsham		
2005	Horsham	18.10 - 118	Dimboola	12.15 - 87	Cameron Penny (H)	Guy Smith	Warracknabeal		
2006	Horsham	27.9 - 171	Dimboola	20.6 - 126	Scott Batchelor (H)	Stuart Farr	Stawell		
2007	Horsham	20.13 - 133	Stawell	13.12 - 90	David Johns (H)	Stuart Farr	Warracknabeal		
2008	Horsham	19.14 - 128	Horsham Saints	?.? - 62	Aaron Barnett (H)	Stuart Farr	Ararat		
2009	Horsham	16.14 - 110	Warrack Eagles	13.8 - 86	Terry Arnel (H)	Stuart Farr	Dimboola		
2010	Horsham	17.16 - 118	Nhill	8.12 - 60	Brad Hartigan (H)	Stuart Farr	Stawell		
2011	Horsham	15.7 - 97	Warrack Eagles	12.13 - 85	Damien Skurrie (H)	Stuart Farr	Dimboola		
2012	Horsham	21.11 - 137	Warrack Eagles	13.12 - 90	Nick Pekin (H)	Stuart Farr	Stawell		
2013	Dimboola	16.15 - 111	Horsham Saints	7.13 - 55	Lachie Exell (D)	Stuart Farr	Nhill		
2014	Horsham	12.10 - 82	Horsham Saints	11.10 - 76	Gavin Kelm (HS)	Jordyn Burke/Brad Hartigan	Stawell		
2015	Horsham Saints	16.6 - 102	Horsham	9.8 - 62	Sam Jasper (HS)	Shayne Breuer	Warracknabeal		
2016	Horsham Saints	6.9 - 45	Minyip-Murtoa	6.7 - 43	Jacob Cooke-Harrison (HS)	Shayne Breuer	Horsham City Oval		
2017	Horsham	7.19 - 57	Minyip-Murtoa	5.7 - 37	Billy Lloyd (H)	Louie Daziel	Dimboola		
2018	Horsham	11.10 - 76	Southern Mallee	9.3 - 57	Ben Larkin (H)	Derek Roberts	Warracknabeal		
2019	Minyip-Murtoa	9.14 - 68	Southern Mallee	6.7 - 43	Kade Petering (MM)	John Delahunty	Horsham		
2020									In recess > COVID 19
2021	1st: Minyip-Murtoa	11 wins, 1 loss	2nd:Southern Mallee	8 wins, 3 losses		John Delahunty			No finals > COVID-19
2022	Minyip-Murtoa	8.11 - 59	Ararat	7.10 - 52	Will Holmes (MM)	Tim McKenzie	Horsham City Oval		
2023	Ararat	10.13 - 73	Southern Mallee	6.16 - 52	Daniel Mendes (A)	Matt Walder	Dimboola		
2024	Ararat	11.11 - 77	Southern Mallee	9.14 - 68	Matthew Spalding (A)	Tom Mills / Tom Williamson	Dimboola		
2025	Ararat	13.13 - 91	Southern Mallee	5.8 - 38	Tom Williamson (A)	Tom Mills / Tom Williamson	Warracknabeal		
2026	Nhill	19.9 - 123	Ararat	12.9 - 81	Jake McQueen (N)	Jake McQueen / Trevor Ryan	Horsham City Oval		
Year	Premiers	Score	Runners up	Score	Best on Ground	Coach	Venue	Gate	Comments

Wimmera District FL - Seniors

- 1920 Ararat d Stawell
- 1921 Warracknabeal d Horsham
- 1922 Minyip d Warracknabeal
- 1923 Warracknabeal d Stawell
- 1924 Horsham d Warracknabeal
- 1925 Stawell d Horsham
- 1926 Stawell d Warracknabeal
- 1927 Warracknabeal d Dimboola
- 1928 Dimboola d Horsham
- 1929 Dimboola d Nhill
- 1930 Stawell d Dimboola
- 1931 Stawell d Ararat
- 1932 Horsham d Ararat
- 1933 Stawell d Ararat

Ballarat / Wimmera Football League

- 1934 South Ballarat d Horsham
- 1935 Ballarat Imperial d Golden Point
- 1936 Ballarat Imperial d Ballarat

Wimmera Football League

- 1937 Dimboola d Stawell
- 1938 Horsham d Stawell
- 1939 Stawell d Nhill
- 1940 Stawell d Dimboola
- 1941-1943 In recess > World War 2

Wimmera Football Association

- 1944 Nhill RAAF d Horsham
- 1945 Warracknabeal d Dimboola

Wimmera Football League

- 1946 Dimboola d Warracknabeal
- 1947 Warracknabeal d Dimboola
- 1948 Stawell d Minyip
- 1949 Ararat d Stawell
- 1950 Stawell d Ararat
- 1951 Ararat d Minyip
- 1952 Minyip d Warracknabeal
- 1953 Warracknabeal d Minyip
- 1954 Minyip d Jeparit
- 1955 Ararat d Horsham
- 1956 Ararat d Minyip
- 1957 Ararat d Horsham
- 1958 Ararat d Dimboola
- 1959 Dimboola d Warracknabeal
- 1960 Horsham d Stawell
- 1961 Rupanyup d Stawell
- 1962 Horsham d Warracknabeal
- 1963 Rupanyup d Nhill
- 1964 Nhill drew Ararat
- 1964 Nhill d Ararat (reply)
- 1965 Nhill d Warracknabeal
- 1966 Warracknabeal d Stawell
- 1967 Horsham d Stawell
- 1968 Horsham d Stawell
- 1969 Nhill d Stawell
- 1970 Horsham d Warracknabeal
- 1971 Ararat d Warracknabeal
- 1972 Horsham d Ararat
- 1973 Rupanyup d Murtoa
- 1974 Horsham d Ararat
- 1975 Ararat d Stawell
- 1976 Horsham d Warracknabeal
- 1977 Warracknabeal d Murtoa
- 1978 Stawell d Horsham
- 1979 Horsham d Murtoa
- 1980 Murtoa d Stawell
- 1981 Nhill d Horsham
- 1982 Horsham d Dimboola
- 1983 Horsham d Dimboola
- 1984 Minyip d Horsham
- 1985 Dimboola d Horsham
- 1986 Ararat d Horsham
- 1987 Stawell d Horsham
- 1988 Horsham United d Warracknabeal
- 1989 Horsham d Ararat
- 1990 Horsham d Warracknabeal
- 1991 Minyip d Stawell
- 1992 Minyip d Warracknabeal
- 1993 Minyip d Ararat
- 1994 Warracknabeal d Horsham United
- 1995 Stawell d Horsham United
- 1996 Minyip-Murtoa d Stawell
- 1997 Minyip-Murtoa d St Michaels
- 1998 Minyip-Murtoa d St Michaels
- 1999 Ararat d Minyip-Murtoa
- 2000 Stawell d Ararat
- 2001 Ararat d Horsham Saints
- 2002 Warrack Eagles d Ararat
- 2003 Horsham d Stawell
- 2004 Horsham d Horsham Saints
- 2005 Horsham d Dimboola
- 2006 Horsham d Dimboola
- 2007 Horsham d Stawell
- 2008 Horsham d Horsham Saints
- 2009 Horsham d Warrack Eagles
- 2010 Horsham d Nhill
- 2011 Horsham d Warrack Eagles
- 2012 Horsham d Warrack Eagles
- 2013 Dimboola d Horsham Saints
- 2014 Horsham d Horsham Saints
- 2015 Horsham Saints d Horsham
- 2016 Horsham Saints d Minyip Murtoa
- 2017 Horsham d Minyip Murtoa
- 2018 Horsham d Southern Mallee
- 2019 Minyip Murtoa d Southern Mallee
- 2020 In recess > COVID-19
- 2021 1st: Minyip Murtoa. No finals > COVID-19
- 2022 Minyip Murtoa d Ararat
- 2023 Ararat d Southern Mallee
- 2024 Ararat d Southern Mallee
- 2025 Ararat d Southern Mallee
- 2026 Nhill d Ararat

== Reserves Premiers / Runners Up ==
Wimmera Football League - RESERVES

- 1951 Nhill d Jeparit
- 1952 Nhill d Stawell
- 1953 Jeparit d Warracknabeal
- 1954 Jeparit d Horsham
- 1955 Jeparit
- 1956 Warracknabeal
- 1957 - 1968: No 2nds competition
- 1969 Warracknabeal d Horsham
- 1970 Murtoa d Warracknabeal
- 1971 Murtoa
- 1972 Warracknabeal d Horsham
- 1973 Ararat d Horsham
- 1974 Murtoa d Warracknabeal
- 1975 Warracknabeal d Nhill
- 1976 Nhill d Murtoa
- 1977 Horsham
- 1978 Ararat d Horsham
- 1979 Horsham d Ararat
- 1980 Horsham d Ararat
- 1981 Ararat d Horsham
- 1982 Horsham d Dimboola
- 1983 Dimboola d Horsham
- 1984 Horsham d Nhill
- 1985 Dimboola d Horsham
- 1986 Murtoa d Dimboola
- 1987 Ararat d Murtoa
- 1988 Horsham
- 1989 Warracknabeal d Ararat
- 1990 Horsham d Ararat
- 1991 Horsham Saints
- 1992 Horsham Saints
- 1993 Ararat d Dimboola
- 1994 Ararat d Dimboola
- 1995 Stawell
- 1996 Minyip-Murtoa
- 1997 Horsham
- 1998 Minyip-Murtoa
- 1999 Ararat d Stawell
- 2000 Horsham
- 2001 Horsham United d Ararat
- 2002 Ararat d Horsham United
- 2003 Horsham United
- 2004 Horsham
- 2005 Horsham United
- 2006 Ararat d Horsham
- 2007 Stawell
- 2008 Stawell
- 2009 Stawell d Horsham Saints
- 2010 Stawell d ? (no scores)
- 2011 Horsham d Warrack Eagles
- 2012 Warrack Eagles d Horsham
- 2013 Horsham d Dimboola
- 2014 Dimboola d Horsham Saints
- 2015 Horsham Saints d Minyip Murtoa
- 2016 Stawell d Minyip Murtoa
- 2017 Horsham Saints d Minyip Murtoa
- 2018 Horsham Saints d Minyip Murtoa
- 2019 Ararat d Horsham
- 2020 in recess > COVID-19
- 2021 1st: Minyip Murtoa. No finals > COVID-19
- 2022 Horsham d Minyip
- 2023 Ararat d Horsham
- 2024 Horsham Saints d Horsham
- 2025 Minyip-Mortoa d Ararat
- 2026 Ararat d Horsham Saints
- In 2010 and 2016, the Wimmera FNL did not enter any Reserves finals scores, teams, goalkickers & best players on the Gameday website.

== Under 16 / Under 17 Premiers & Runners Up ==
Wimmera Football League - UNDER 16's

- 1961 - Ararat d Warracknabeal
- 1962 -
- 1963 -
- 1964 -
- 1965 - Murtoa d Warracknabeal
- 1966 - Dimboola
- 1967 - Dimboola
- 1968 - Dimboola
- 1969 - Nhill
- 1970 - Rupanyup
- 1971 - Dimboola
- 1972 - Dimboola
- 1973 - Warracknabeal
- 1974 - Jeparit
- 1975 - Dimboola d Warracknabeal
- 1976 - Rupanyup d Murtoa
- 1977 - Stawell
- 1978 - Ararat d Stawell
- 1979 - Ararat d Dimboola
- 1980 - Stawell
- 1981 - Dimboola d Ararat
- 1982 - Ararat d Nhill
- 1983 - Nhill d Ararat
- 1984 - Stawell d Jeparit
- 1985 - Nhill
- 1986 - Horsham
- 1987 - Murtoa d Horsham
- 1988 - Horsham
- 1989 - Stawell
- 1990 - Horsham
- 1991 - Nhill
- 1992 - Horsham
- 1993 - Horsham

Wimmera FL - Under 17's (around 1994?)

- 1994 - Stawell d Ararat
- 1995 - Stawell
- 1996 - Ararat d Horsham United
- 1997 - Stawell
- 1998 - Ararat d Horsham United
- 1999 - Horsham United
- 2000 - Ararat d Stawell
- 2001 - Stawell
- 2002 - Stawell
- 2003 - Horsham
- 2004 - Warrack Eagles
- 2005 - Warrack Eagles
- 2006 - Ararat d Horsham
- 2007 - Ararat d Horsham
- 2008 - Horsham d Ararat
- 2009 - Ararat d Horsham
- 2010 - Ararat d Horsham Saints
- 2011 - Ararat d Minyip Murtoa
- 2012 - Ararat d Horsham
- 2013 - Horsham d Minyip Murtoa
- 2014 - Horsham d Stawell
- 2015 - Ararat d Stawell
- 2016 - Horsham d Horsham Saints
- 2017 - Ararat d Horsham Saints
- 2018 - Ararat d Stawell
- 2019 - Horsham Saints d Ararat
- 2020 - In recess > COVID-19
- 2021 - 1st:Horsham Saints.No finals-COVID-19
- 2022 - Ararat d Horsham
- 2023 - Horsham d Horsham Saints
- 2024 - Horsham d Horsham Saints
- 2025 - Horsham Saints d Horsham
- 2026 - Horsham d Ararat

== Under 14 Premiers / Runners Up ==
Wimmera Football League - UNDER 14's

- 1998 - Horsham United
- 1999 - Stawell
- 2000 - Horsham
- 2001 - Horsham
- 2002 - Stawell d Ararat
- 2003 - Stawell
- 2004 - Ararat
- 2005 - Horsham
- 2006 - Horsham d Ararat
- 2007 - Horsham Saints
- 2008 - Stawell
- 2009 - Minyip Murtoa d Horsham Saints
- 2010 - Ararat d Horsham (no scores)
- 2011 - Horsham d Ararat
- 2012 - Ararat d Horsham Saints
- 2013 - Horsham d Horsham Saints
- 2014 - Horsham Saints d Stawell
- 2015 - Ararat d Horsham
- 2016 - Ararat v Horsham Saints
- 2017 - Horsham d Horsham Saints
- 2018 - Ararat d Horsham
- 2019 - Horsham d Ararat
- 2020 - In recess > COVID-19
- 2021 - 1st: Ararat. No finals > COVID-19
- 2022 - Horsham d Ararat
- 2023 - Horsham d Horsham Saints
- 2024 - Horsham d Ararat
- 2025 - Horsham d Nhill
- 2026 - Nhill d Ararat

== Best & Fairest / Leading Goalkicker ==
Wimmera Football League - Best & Fairest Award

The Hugh Cameron Medal was first awarded and donated by Wimmera FL President and Life Member, Hugh Cameron in 1927 for the leading goalkicker, it then became the best and fairest award in 1928.

The Wimmera FNL senior football best and fairest award was initially named the Les Schneider Medal in 1948, after former Dimboola footballer and 1931 John McNeill medallist, Les Schneider donated money for the initial award in 1948.

The Pat J Toohey Trophy was named in 1949 to perpetuate the name of former Wimmera FL President and Warracknabeal barrister and solicitor, Mr. Pat J Toohey, who commenced on the Wimmera FL committee in 1930, was president when the Wimmera FL was reformed in 1937 and was president from 1937 to 1941. Mr Toohey died in 1943, aged 56.

When Ararat's Glen Antonio won the Toohey Medal in 1992, he became part of the first father and son combination to win this prestigious award, as his father, Jack won the award in 1956.

Ararat's Alan Batchelor has won Wimmera FL best and fairest awards in all three grades.

Senior Football - Most best and fairest wins

- 5 - Tony Beck: Stawell
- 4 - Wes Warrick: Nhill
- 3 - Jim Rice: Murtoa
- 3 - Arnie McIntyre: Murtoa
- 3 - Peter Morrison: Murtoa & Horsham
- 3 - Kieran Delahunty: Minyip-Murtoa

Senior Football - Century Goalkickers

- 1931 - Horrie Hunt: Stawell
- 1936 - Max Wheeler: Ballarat
- 1947 - Alex Denham: Warracknabeal
- 1949 - Nimmy Grainger: Stawell
- 1950, 1955 - Bill Smeaton: Ararat
- 1969 - David Denham: Warracknabeal
- 1970 - Graeme Schultz: Warracknabeal
- 1971 - Graeme Sladdin: Ararat
- 1975 - Richard Kalms: Dimboola
- 1976 - Gary Stenhouse: Horsham
- 1977 - Des Trotter: Warracknabeal
- 1978 - John Pollock: Stawell
- 1979 - Gary Todd: Ararat
- 1980 - Brett Thompson: Stawell
- 1983 - Drew Heard: Dimboola
- 1984 - Roger Chilton: Nhill
- 1985, 87, 1991 to 96: John Hotker: Minyip
- 1986, 88, 90 - Tony Winsell: Warracknabeal
- 1997 - Andrew Kemp: Nhill
- 1999 - Josh Burgess: St Michael's
- 2009 - Gavin Kelm: Horsham Saints

Season	SENIORS Best & Fairest	Club	Votes	Leading goal-kicker	Club	Goals
	Hugh Cameron Medal					
1927				Jimmy Lawson	Dimboola	93
1928	Eric Zschech	Minyip	7	Jimmy Lawson	Dimboola	72
1929	Jim Rice	Murtoa	7	Jimmy Lawson &	Dimboola	63
				George Simmonds	Murtoa	63
1930	Jim Rice	Murtoa	8	Jimmy Lawson	Dimboola	82
	John McNeill Medal					
1931	Les Schneider &	Dimboola	7	Horrie Hunt	Stawell	105
Stan P Freeland Medal
	Jim Rice	Murtoa	7			
1932	Horrie Hunt	Stawell	3	1st: Horrie Hunt	Stawell	51 (59)
				2nd: Martin Brown	Horsham	42 (55)
1933	Bill Earle	Stawell	6	Roy Copley	Ararat	67
Ballarat Wimmera FL: George McKenzie Medal
1934	E Ted Bourke	Ararat	20	Greg Anderson	Ballarat	72
1935	W.T. "Webber" Jackson	Ballarat	33	1st: Lou Reiffel	Imperial	81
				2nd: Jimmy Lawson	Horsham	69
1936	Stan Webb	Imperial	26	Max Wheeler	Ballarat	108
Wimmera FL: Best & Fairest / Goal Kicking Awards
1937	No award			Jack Weight	Murtoa	98
1938	No award			Ted McCarthy	Jeparit	93
1939	No award			Bob McKey	Stawell	87
1940	No award			Tom Kilpatrick	Horsham	31 (37)
1941-43	In recess > WW2					
1944	No award					
1945	No award					
1946	No award			Dick Drever	Ararat	68
1947	No award			Alex Denham	Warracknabeal	109
	Les Schneider Trophy					
1948	Arnie McIntyre	Murtoa	22	Nimmy Grainger	Stawell	68 (78)
	P J Toohey Trophy					
1949	Arnie McIntyre	Murtoa	25	Nimmy Grainger	Stawell	97 (108)
1950	Arnie McIntyre	Murtoa	26	Bill Smeaton	Ararat	110 (120)
1951	Geoff Stewart	Stawell	26	Ted Whitfield	Ararat	69 (72)
1952	Wes Warrick	Nhill	23	Ken Smale	Warracknabeal	60 (72)
1953	Jim Gull	Rupanyup	32	Ken Smale	Warracknabeal	63 (65)
1954	Wes Warrick	Nhill	31	Bill Smeaton	Ararat	61 (67)
1955	Wes Warrick	Nhill	24	Bill Smeaton	Ararat	122 (128)
1956	Jack Antonio	Ararat	19	Bill Smeaton	Ararat	74 (94)
1957	Eric "Bluey" Clayton	Jeparit	25	Jim Gull	Rupanyup	88
1958	Robert Dunlop	Rupanyup	19	Bill Gleeson	Ararat	66 (68)
1959	Robert Dunlop	Rupanyup	27	Bill Smeaton	Stawell	72
1960	Wes Warrick	Nhill	28	Ian Morgan	Rupanyup	85 (90)
1961	Dinny Lindsay	Murtoa	27	Trevor Gilmour	Nhill	60 (61)
	Pat J Toohey Medal					
1962	John Rohan	Murtoa	24	Ian Morgan	Rupanyup	76 (89)
1963	Jim Bonner &	Ararat	15	Ian Morgan	Rupanyup	66 (77)
	Dinny Lindsay	Murtoa				
1964	Peter Patterson	Nhill	18	Ian Morgan	Rupanyup	78
1965	Phil Gehrig &	Jeparit	19	Graeme Clyne	Warracknabeal	71 (73)
	Graeme Clyne	Warracknabeal				
1966	Graeme Clyne	Warracknabeal	30	Doug Schumann	Jeparit	58 (59)
1967	Russell Crow	Warracknabeal	22	Keith Smith	Horsham	83 (91)
1968	Vic Ruth	Minyip	32	Keith Bromage	Dimboola	95
1969	Rod Coutts &	Nhill	21	David Denham	Warracknabeal	99 (101)
	Mike Pickering	Stawell	21			
1970	John Billings	Minyip	21	Graeme Schultz	Warracknabeal	105 (122)
1971	Leo Maloney &	Ararat	18	Graeme Sladdin	Ararat	121 (139)
	John Sudholz	Rupanyap	18			
1972	Norm Watson	Dimboola	20	Murray Emerson	Stawell	75 (76)
1973	Laurie Stephens	Ararat	30	Doug Schumann	Jeparit	90
1974	Greg Bell &	Rupanyap	18	Doug Schumann	Jeparit	74
	Peter Wood	Horsham	18			
1975	Peter Morrison	Murtoa	26	Richard Kalms	Dimboola	100 (122)
1976	Peter Morrison	Murtoa	23	Gary Stenhouse	Horsham	104 (118)
1977	Graham Clayton	Murtoa	22	Des Trotter	Warracknabeal	126 (131)
1978	Terry Davis	Rupanyap	25	John Pollock	Stawell	94 (110)
1979	Mike Delahunty	Murtoa	22	Gary Todd	Ararat	109 (111)
1980	Tony Beck	Stawell	32	Brett Thompson	Stawell	88 (101)
1981	Tony Beck	Stawell	16	Alan Hinch	Warracknabeal	58 (60)
1982	Peter Morrison	Horsham	18	Tony Winsall	Warracknabeal	65
1983	Tony Beck	Stawell	25	Drew Heard	Dimboola	111 (119)
	Peter Light	Horsham	25			
1984	Peter Light	Horsham	19	Roger Chilton	Nhill	107 (120)
1985	Gary Jelly	Murtoa	21	John Hotker	Minyip	113 (128)
1986	Tony Beck	Stawell	22	Tony Winsall	Warracknabeal	102
1987	Tony Beck	Stawell	17	John Hotker	Minyip	105
	Andrew Johns	Horsham	17			
	Darren Lloyd	Minyip	17			
1988	Stephen Graham	Nhill	19	Tony Winsall	Warracknabeal	83 (101)
1989	Bruce Gardy	Murtoa	24	John Hotker	Minyip	143 (153)
1990	Peter Simmonds	Nhill	18	Tony Winsall	Warracknabeal	100 (122)
1991	Shane McGrath	Minyip	27	John Hotker	Minyip	133 (152)
1992	Glen Antonio	Ararat	15	John Hotker	Minyip	95 (108)
1993	Harvey Lang	Horsham United	23	John Hotker	Minyip	112 (141)
1994	Simon Sutterby	Stawell	27	John Hotker	Minyip	96 (110)
1995	Stewart Devlin	Warracknabeal		John Hotker	Minyip-Murtoa	111 (128)
1996	Leigh Funcke	Minyip-Murtoa	22	John Hotker	Minyip-Murtoa	102 (116)
1997	Robert Broadhurst	Nhill	19	Andrew Kemp	Nhill	117
1998	Gavin Kelm	St. Michaels	26	Josh Burgess	St. Michael's	84 (90)
1999	Matt Glare	Horsham	20	Josh Burgess	St. Michael's	113 (127)
2000	Matt Ilsley	Stawell	24	Rohan May	Ararat	85 (87)
2001	Brett Monoghan	Horsham Saints		Josh Burgess	Horsham Saints	76 (87)
2002	Matt Jackson	Ararat		Graeme Nuskes	Warracknabeal	62 (78)
2003	Dale Bligh	Ararat		David Johns	Horsham	121 (136)
2004	Scott Batchelor	Horsham		Bradley Miller	Horsham	109
2005	Peter McFarlane	Dimboola		David Johns	Horsham	125 (130)
2006	Cameron Penny	Horsham		David Johns	Horsham	141 (156)
2007	Brent Tuckey &	Stawell		David Johns	Horsham	109 (121)
	Peter McFarlane	Dimboola				
2008	Alan Batchelor	Ararat		Clinton Midgley	Minyip-Murtoa	67
2009	Marcus Anson	Horsham		Gavin Kelm	Horsham Saints	99 (105)
2010	Leonard Clark	Minyip-Murtoa		David Johns	Horsham	77 (86)
2011	Steve Schulz	Warrack Eagles		Daniel Hargreaves	Nhill	60
2012	Phil Butsch	Horsham Saints		Lachlan Exell	Dimboola	78 (86)
2013	Justin Chilver	Dimboola	21	Lachlan Exell	Dimboola	72 (79)
2014	Kieran Delahunty	Minyip-Murtoa	16	Lachlan Exell	Dimboola	68
2015	Billy Lloyd	Horsham	20	Ashley Clugston	Dimboola	53
2016	Sam Clyne	Horsham Saints	21	Jacob Cook-Harrison	Horsham Saints	62 (73)
2017	Billy Hayes	Nhill	18	Joel Geue	Horsham	57 (60)
2018	Ryan Kemp &	Horsham	20	Ryan Kemp	Horsham	71 (79)
	Daniel Mendes &	Ararat	20			
	Nicholas Peters	Warrack Eagles	20			
2019	Ben McIntyre	Minyip-Murtoa	28	Cody Driscoll	Stawell	46 (47)
2020	In recess > COVID-19					
2021	Kieran Delahunty	Minyip-Murtoa	22	Cody Driscoll &	Stawell	37
				Brayden Ison	Minyip-Murtoa	37
2022	Kieran Delahunty	Minyip-Murtoa	25	Mitch Thorp	Stawell	46 (56)
2023	Thomas Eckel &	Stawell	20	Mitch Martin	Horsham Saints	55 (58)
	Jake Robinson	Ararat	20			
	Tom Williamson*	Ararat	(22)			
2024	Tom Williamson	Ararat	26	Tom Williamson	Ararat	57 (66)
2025	Ben Taylor	Ararat	20	Paul Summers	Stawell	76 (78)
2026	Tom Williamson	Ararat	21	Paul Summers	Stawell	63 (67)
2027						
Season	Best & Fairest Medal	Club	Votes	Leading goal-kicker	Club	Goals

- 2023 - Tom Williamson (Ararat) polled the most votes, but was ineligible due to a suspension.

=== Reserves Football: Best & Fairest ===
The Wimmera FNL Reserves football best and fairest award has been called the A.E. "Hank" Neil Medal since? Neil was a former secretary of the Wimmera FNL from 1951 to 1976.

Season	RESERVES Best & Fairest	Club	Votes	Leading goal-kicker	Club	Goals
1951	Max Westland	Minyip				
1952	L Murphy	Jeparit				
1953	P Coleman	Murtoa				
1954	Ken Reichelt	Nhill	13			
1955	Jim Hartigan	Horsham				
1956	Ces Werner	Jeparit				
1957-68	2nds comp in recess					
1969	Dale Petering	Minyip				
1970	Don Ballantine	Rupanyup				
1971	Brian Jaensch	Warracknabeal				
1972	Kevin McKenzie	Murtoa				
1973	Ken Thompson	Murtoa				
1974	Allan Barry	Minyip				
1975	Steven Potter	Stawell				
1976	Peter Shearer	Ararat				
1977	Ken Murphy	Dimboola				
1978	Ian Potter	Stawell				
1979	Shane Todd	Ararat				
1980	Ray Schodde	Murtoa				
1981	Jeff Fritsch	Nhill				
1982	Mark Ruwoldt	Minyip				
1983	Roger Chilton	Nhill				
1984	Peter Miller	Imps Wonwondah				
1985	Gus Keel &	Murtoa				
	Craig Sholl	Horsham				
1986	Terry Davis	Murtoa				
1987	Terry Davis	Murtoa				
1988	Paul Freak	Horsham United				
1989	Peter Morrison	Horsham				
1990	Paul Freak	Horsham United				
1991	Mick Spalding	Ararat				
1992	Matt Irwin	Horsham United				
1993	Alan Mills	Horsham				
1994	Des Beaton	Stawell				
1995	Bill Norton	Stawell				
1996	Glenn Hobbs	Horsham				
1997	Phil Pyke	Minyip Murtoa				
1998	Darren Bahl	Ararat				
1999	Darren Bahl	Ararat				
2000	Darren Bahl	Ararat				
2001	Wayne Schultz	Horsham				
2002	Shaun Brown	Horsham United				
2003	Adam Jolly	Horsham United				
2004	Kevin Jones	Nhill				
2005	Andrew Seers	Horsham				
2006	Simon Hooper	Horsham				
2007	Warren Frost	Horsham				
2008	Matthew Glare	Horsham				
2009	Joseph Manserra	Horsham		Todd Matthews	Stawell	49
2010	Simon Mock	Nhill		Jamie Solyom	Stawell	80 (91)
2011	Tom Robertson	Horsham Saints		Jamie Solyom	Stawell	82 (93)
2012	Carl Osbt &	Horsham		Isaac Eldridge	Dimboola	38 (39)
	Luke Oldaker	Nhill				
2013	Jackson O'Neill	Dimboola	22	Justin Combe	Horsham Saints	51
	Jye Smith	Horsham	22			
2014	Jye Smith	Horsham	21	George Walker	Horsham Saints	51 (52)
2015	Heath Kelm	Horsham Saints	32	Mitchell Olafsen	Stawell	43 (47)
2016	Nathan Sabbo	Stawell	17	Chris Delahunty	Minyip Murtoa	61
2017	Shane Field	Stawell	15	Mitchell King	Stawell	36
2018	Gavin Kelm	Horsham Saints	?	Bradley Leith	Minyip Murtoa	35
2019	Gavin Kelm	Horsham Saints	24	Gavin Kelm	Horsham Saints	36 (40)
2020	In recess >	COVID-19				
2021	Tim Wade	Horsham	16	Jake McIntyre	Horsham Saints	47
2022	Jordan Taylor	Warrick Eagles	26	Cody Frizon	Horsham	47 (54)
2023	Tim Bone	Nhill	17	Zach Louder	Ararat	62
2024	Matthew Combe	Horsham Saints	22	Gavin Kelm	Horsham Saints	77
2025	Alan Batchelor	Ararat		Corey Taylor	Ararat	49
2026	Alan Batchelor	Ararat	22	Jackson Bohner	Ararat	48 (49)
2027						
Season	Best & Fairest Medal	Club	Votes	Leading goal-kicker	Club	Goals

=== Thirds Football: Best and Fairest ===
Season	THIRDS Best & Fairest	Club	Votes	Leading goal-kicker	Club	Goals
1965	?					
1966	Gerald Arnold	Rupanyup				
1967	Ivan Menzel	Nhill				
1968	Peter Rogers	Warracknabeal				
1969	Jeff Fritsch &	Nhill				
	Steven Matthews	Rupanyup				
1970	Steven Matthews	Rupanyup				
1971	Linsey Martin	Warracknabeal				
1972	Peter Reading	Ranpanyup				
1973	David Oram	Rupanyup				
1974	Mark Evans	Warracknabeal				
1975	Peter Harradine	Dimboola				
1976	Wayne Beddison	Dimboola				
1977	Wayne Beddison	Dimboola				
1978	Darren Austin	Stawell				
1979	Paul McDonald	Stawell				
1980	David Williams	Ararat				
1981	Paul Matthews	Stawell				
1982	Murray McKinnis	Ararat				
1983	Graeme Bye	Nhill				
1984	Nick Bush	Dimboola				
1985	Shaun Allen	Stawell				
1986	Glen Hall &	Nhill				
	Nick Haslau	Horsham				
1987	Damien Walsh	Stawell				
1988	Richard Beney	Warracknabeal				
1989	Nathan Young	Stawell				
1990	Craig Ellis	Stawell				
1991	Shaun Collins	Horsham				
1992	Brendan McCartney	Nhill				
1993	Rodney Mackely	Stawell				
1994	Andrew Young	Horsham				
1995	Scott Mackay	Stawell				
1996	Shane Krings	Ararat				
1997	Dion Hair	Horsham United				
1998	Mark Crafter	Horsham				
1999	Matt Sawyer	Stawell				
2000	Ben Walters	Nhill				
2001	Quinton Rethus	Horsham				
2002	Dan McDonald	Warrack Eagles				
2003	Alan Batchelor	Ararat				
2004	Dean Le Blanc	Dimboola				
2005	Jagen Ross	Horsham				
2006	Joel Kelly	Horsham				
2007	Jackson O'Neil	Dimboola				
2008	Ricky Scott	Nhill				
2009	Darcy O'Connor	Horsham Saints		Aaron McKinnis	Ararat	62 (70)
2010	Kieran Delahunty	Minyip Murtoa		Tom Driscoll	Nhill	81 (84)
2011	Mitchell Dahlenburg	Nhill		Mitchell Olafsen	Stawell	64 (70)
2012	Alexander Laidlaw	Ararat		Jack Dawson	Horsham	61 (68)
2013	Alexander Laidlaw	Ararat	24	Ryan Kemp	Horsham	36 (47)
2014	Jackson Taurau	Stawell	19	Aidan Jensz	Stawell	50 (52)
2015	Oliver Timms	Horsham Saints	20	Aidan Jensz	Stawell	50 (59)
2016	Jack Antonio	Ararat		Cooper Heard	Ararat	56 (64)
2017	Cori Corrigan	Ararat	22	Cori Corrigan	Ararat	69 (74)
2018	Jakob Salmi	Stawell	18	Aiden Graveson	Stawell	49 (55)
2019	Dyson Parish	Horsham	27	Hudson Hair	Horsham	40
2020	In recess >	COVID-19				
2021	Oscar Gawith &	Minyip Murtoa	16	Jake McIntyre	Horsham Saints	47
	Sonny Kettle	Ararat	16			
2022	Zac Smith	Horsham	17	Max Bunworth	Horsham	23 (25)
2023	Patrick Toner	Ararat	22	Jesse Taylor	Horsham Saints	34 (38)
2024	Jobe Dickinson	Nhill	24	Jaxon Crooks	Horsham Saints	37 (47)
2025	Bodey Wilde	Horsham Saints	23	Chase Kannar	Horsham Saints	37 (38)
2026	Hayden Polack	Warrack Eagles	38	Mason Notting	Stawell	53 (54)
2027						
Season	THIRDS Best & Fairest	Club	Votes	Leading goal-kicker	Club	Goals

== VFL/AFL and drafted players ==
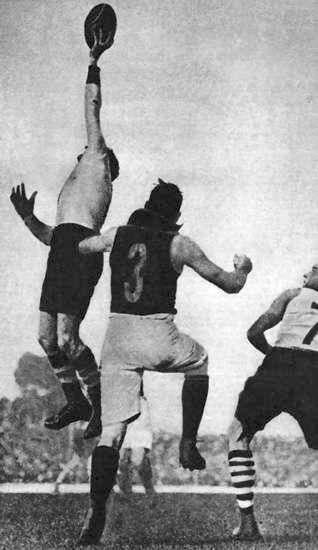
1925 Minyip captain-coach, Roy Cazaly

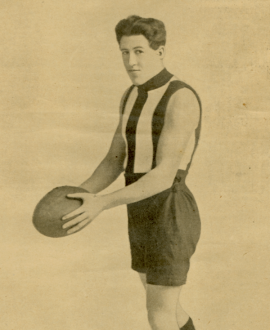
Former Stawell captain-coach & 1924 Stawell Gift winner, Bill Twomey Sr.

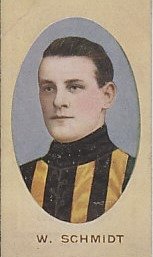
Warracknabeal premiership captain-coach, Billy Schmidt, 1921, 23 & 27

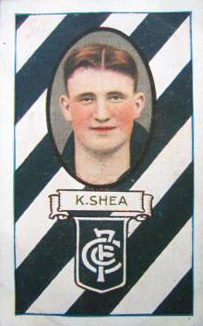
1947 Rupanyup captain-coach, Keith Shea

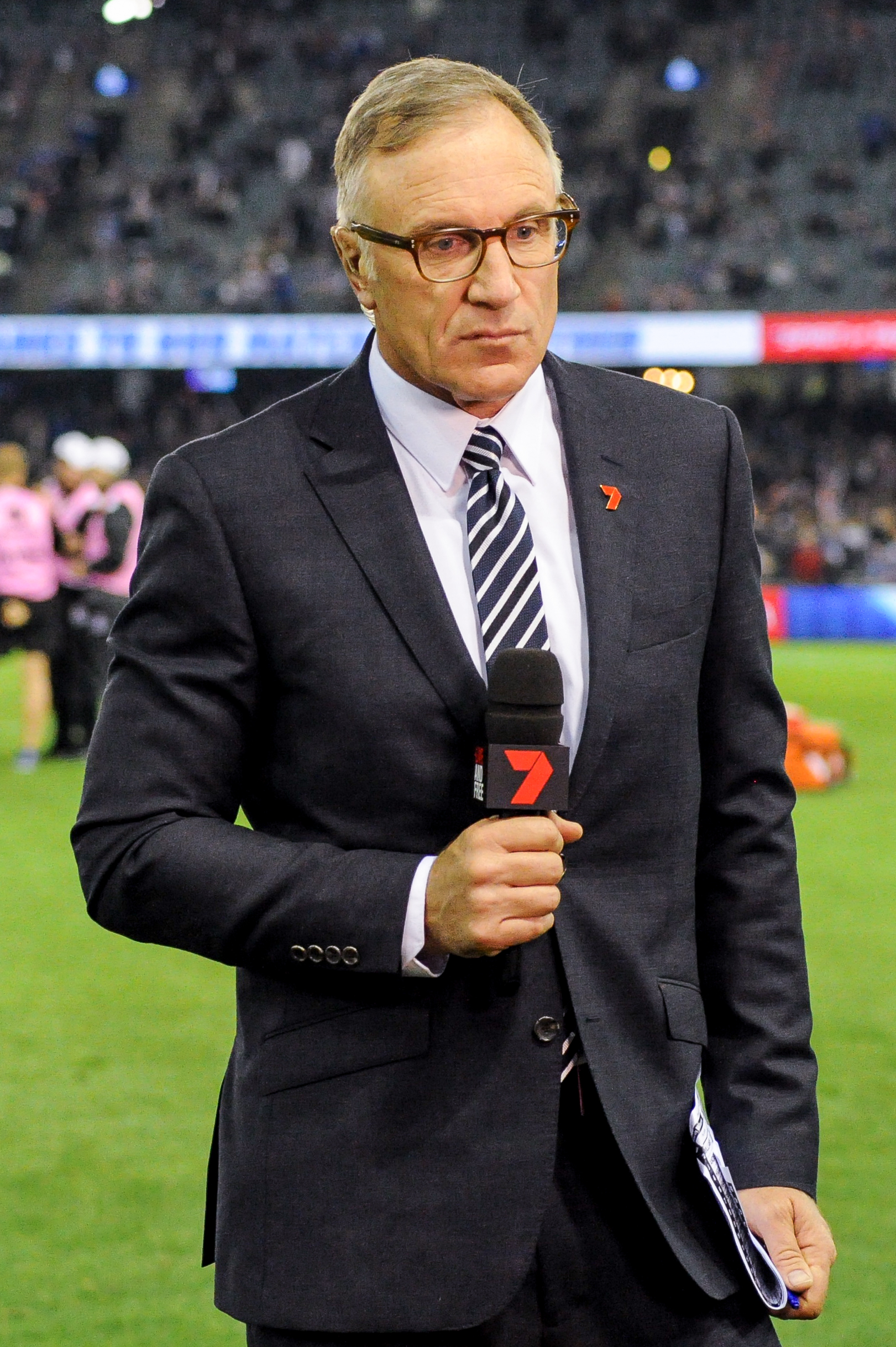
Former Dimboola player, Tim Watson, 2017

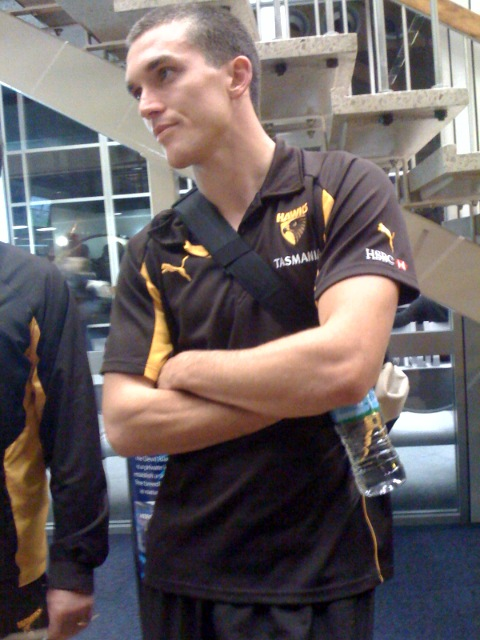
Former Minyip Murtoa player, Clinton Young

Click on the Wikipedia club page links below to view a complete list of VFL / AFL from Wimmera FNL clubs, with the year indicating their VFL or Wimmera FNL debut.

- Ararat FNC
- Dimboola FNC
- Horsham Demons FNC
- Horsham Saints FNC
- Nhill FNC
- Stawell FNC

Horsham United

- 1996 - Brad Cassidy – Fremantle, Fitzroy, Collingwood

From Jeparit

- 1908 - Alby Landt - St Kilda
- 1939 - Les Griggs - Essendon
- 1945 - Dan Beauvais - Carlton
- 1954 - Ian Ridley - Melbourne
- 1956 - Ken Hedt - Collingwood
- 1958 - Errol Hutchesson - Collingwood
- 1967 - Peter Chilton - Hawthorn

Came to Jeparit

- 1939 - Don Hooper - St Kilda
- 1948 - Tom Roulent - South Melbourne
- 1956 - Ted Jarrard - North Melbourne

From Minyip

- 1913 - Cyril Suares - Collingwood
- 1926 - Roy Cazaly – South Melbourne, St Kilda
- 1927 - Jack Evans - Geelong
- 1930 - Eric Zschech - Richmond
- 1950 - Frank Drum - Richmond
- 1959 - Bill McGrath - South Melbourne
- 1959 - Hedley Wills - South Melbourne
- 1962 - Bob Johnstone - Collingwood
- 1986 - Stuart Cameron – Fitzroy, Melbourne
- 1988 - Leigh Funcke - Fitzroy (Pick No. 101)
- 1996 - Ross Funcke – Richmond, Melbourne

Came to Minyip

- 1922 - Gladstone Power - South Melbourne
- 1934 - Billy Schmidt - Richmond
- 1937 - Bill Hearn - Richmond
- 1947 - Des Martin - Richmond
- 1949 - Wally Culpitt - Hawthorn
- 1952 - Ken Roberts - Richmond
- 1956 - Laurie Icke - North Melbourne
- 1958 - Vic Bodsworth - Footscray
- 1991 - Ronnie Wearmouth - Collingwood

From Murtoa

- 1901 - Charlie Mullany - St Kilda
- 1914 - Stan Brady - St Kilda
- 1932 - Don Stewart - St Kilda
- 1933 - Rowley Fischer – Melbourne
- 1938 - Alan Killigrew – St Kilda
- 1942 - Vic Castles - South Melbourne
- 1948 - George Caris - South Melbourne
- 1953 - Bob Constable - Melbourne
- 1955 - Ron McDonald – Richmond
- 1971 - Hugh Delahunty– Essendon
- 1971 - Mike Delahunty – Collingwood

Came to Murtoa

- 1928 - Harry Pollock - Richmond
- 1937 - Leo Opray - Carlton
- 1947 - Bill Wells - St Kilda
- 1949 - Jim Hovey - Geelong
- 1967 - Milne McCooke - St Kilda

Minyip-Murtoa

- 2005 - Clinton Young – Hawthorn

From Rupanyap

- 1926 - Ivan Corry - Hawthorn
- 1929 - John Sampson - Footscray
- 1935 - Alf Sampson - Footscray
- 1944 - Dick Wearmouth - Footscray
- 1960 - Robert Dunlop - Essendon
- 1966 - John Sudholz – South Melbourne
- 1973 - Trevor Tyler – Essendon
- 1975 - Greg Bell – Essendon

Came to Rupanyup

- 1920 - Norm McIntosh - Richmond
- 1947 - Keith Shea - Hawthorn
- 1951 - Jim Gull - South Melbourne
- 1953 - Arthur Fox Jr. - South Melbourne
- 1957 - Mick Sibun - South Melbourne
- 1960 - Kevin Northcote - Hawthorn

From Warracknabeal / Warrack Eagles

- 1929 - Charlie Parsons - Carlton
- 1929 - Alan Scott - St Kilda
- 1951 - Peter West - Geelong
- 1955 - Ken Smale - Collingwood
- 1960 - Russell Crow – Fitzroy
- 1961 - John Hayes - Fitzroy
- 1961 - Basil Moloney - Richmond
- 1962 - Graeme Clyne - Fitzroy
- 1971 - Andy Wilson - Essendon
- 1971 - Graeme Schultz – - Essendon
- 1975 - Graeme Hatcher - Essendon
- 2003 - Jeremy Clayton – North Melbourne
- 2005 - Matt Rosa – West Coast, Gold Coast
- 2008 - Kyle Cheney – Melbourne, Hawthorn, Adelaide

Came to Warracknabeal

- 1919 - Billy Schmidt - St Kilda
- 1938 - Gordon Ogden - Melbourne
- 1947 - Tom Arklay - Geelong
- 1950's - Hugh Morris - Essendon
- 1979 - Geoff Burdett - Essendon

== Netball ==
The Wimmera Basketball (Netball) Association was commenced in 1952 under the auspices of the National Fitness Youth Movement and when the name of women's basketball became netball in 1971 the Netball competition was established as the Wimmera Netball Association with A. Grade and B. Grade competitions.

The Under 16's commenced in 1977, before becoming an Under 17 competition in 1987, then Under 18 in 1990, then 17 and Under in 1993.

The 15 and Under competition commenced in 1995. Between 2011 and 2018 there was a Division A and Division B in the 15 and Under WNA competition.

Unfortunately, there are no complete records on the internet or on the Wimmera FNL website or published in the annual Wimmera FNL grand final Record of past netball premierships in all grades between 1952 and 2022.

- - * Indicates undefeated premiers.

=== Wimmera Netball Association: Premiership Table ===
	Wimmera Netball Association: 1971 – to present day						
Year	A. Grade 1950's > present	B. Grade 1953 > present	C. Grade ? > present	C. Reserve 2021 > present	Under 17 1977 > present	15 & Unders 1995 > present	13 & Unders ? > present
1952	Jeparit						
1953	Rupanyup 24 d Jeparit 11	Rupanyup d Dimboola					
1954	Minyip d Dimboola						
1955	Dimboola d						
1956	Dimboola d						
1957	Dimboola d						
1958	Horsham d						
1959	Warracknabeal d						
1960							
1961							
1962							
1963	Warracknabeal d						
1964							
1965							
1966	Warracknabeal d						
1967	Nhill d						
1968	Nhill d						
1969	Horsham d						
1970	Horsham d						
1971	Horsham d						
1972	Stawell d						
1973	Stawell 34 d Ararat 29	Warracknabeal 25 d Ararat 24					
1974	Stawell 26 d Ararat 20	Warracknabeal 33 d Ararat 20					
1975	Ararat* 40 d Horsham 32						
1976	Horsham 47 d Ararat 46						
1977	Ararat 58 d Horsham 53	Warracknabeal 38 d Ararat 33			U/16: Ararat 25 d Dimboola 14		
1978	Horsham 41 d Ararat 34	Ararat 48 d Warracknabeal 35			U/16: Ararat 28 d Warracknabeal 23		
1979	Ararat 40 d Horsham 31	Ararat 54 d Horsham 23					
1980	Ararat* 43 d Horsham 40						
1981	Ararat 54 d Horsham 41	Horsham 51 d Ararat 34			U/16: Ararat 41 d Warracknabeal 19		
1982	Ararat* 40 d Horsham 35	Warracknabeal 38 d Ararat 30					
1983	Horsham 58 d Ararat 42	Ararat 45 d Horsham 43			U/16: Stawell 49 d Ararat 48		
1984	Horsham 46 d Ararat 39	Ararat 55 d Horsham 33			U/16: Ararat 37 d Dimboola 35		
1985	Ararat 39 d Horsham 37	?					
1986	Horsham 46 d Ararat 28						
1987	Ararat 29 d Horsham 23						
1988	Ararat 50 d Horsham 45				U/17: Ararat 32 d Horsham 19		
1989	Ararat 44 d Horsham 31	Horsham 38 d Ararat 34			17&U: Ararat 37 d Nhill 33		
1990	Horsham 38 d Ararat 35	Warracknabeal 52 d Ararat 47			U/18: Nhill 48 d Ararat 24		
1991	Ararat* 36 d Horsham 23	Ararat* 32 d Horsham 22					
1992	Horsham 36 d Ararat 30	Horsham 44 d Ararat 41			18&U: Horsham United 46 d Ararat 26		
1993	Ararat 43 d Horsham 38	Horsham 52 d Ararat 47			17&U:		
1994	Ararat 53 d Horsham Saints 50	Horsham 48 d Ararat 47					
1995	Horsham United d ?						
1996	Horsham United 52 d Ararat 42						
1997	Ararat 50 d Horsham United 39						
1998	Horsham d Ararat						
1999	Horsham 44 d Ararat 30						
2000	Horsham 48 d Ararat 35	Horsham 45 d Ararat 30				Horsham Saints	
2001	Horsham 58 d Ararat 35						
2002	Horsham 58 d Ararat 28					Horsham Saints d	
2003	Horsham 58 d Ararat 28				Horsham Saints 33 d Ararat 20		
2004	Horsham Saints						
2005	Ararat 33 d Horsham United 32						
2006	Horsham 46 d Ararat 39						
2007	Ararat* 41 d Warrack Eagles 19						Horsham Saints
2008	Ararat* 41 d Warrack Eagles 28				Minyip Murtoa 31 d Ararat 25		
2009	Ararat* 43 d Warrack Eagles 40				Minyip Murtoa 25 d Ararat 21		
2010	Warrack Eagles 51 d Ararat 46					Horsham 34 d Ararat 19	
2011	Warrack Eagles d ?					A: Warrack Eagles 47 d Ararat 30; B: ?	
2012	Horsham 51 d Ararat 37					A: ? B: Warrack Eagles 35 d Ararat 22	
2013	Horsham 42 d Ararat 30	Horsham 56 d Stawell 33	Stawell 33 d Horsham 29		Horsham 36 d Warrack Eagles 35	A: Horsham 38 d Hor Saints 29; B: Horsham 30 d Hor Saints 20	Stawell 24 d Horsham 21
2014	Horsham 62 d Warrack Eagles 39	Horsham 40 d Stawell 35	Horsham 34 d Stawell 32		Warrack 39 d Horsham Saints 35	A: Ararat 31 d Horsham 29; B: ?	Horsham Saints 34 d Horsham 32
2015	Warrack Eagles 33 d Horsham 32	Horsham 43 d Stawell 37	Stawell 29 d Horsham 27		Horsham 35 d Ararat 16	A: Hor Saints 32 d Horsham 28; B: Horsham 30 d Hor Saints 18	Stawell 38 d Ararat 29
2016	Horsham 41 d Minyip Murtoa 35	Minyip Murtoa 47 d Ararat 40	Horsham Saints		Horsham	A: Horsham; B: Stawell	Horsham
2017	Horsham Saints 48 d Minyip Murtoa 47	Ararat* 58 d Warrack Eagles 32	Minyip Murtoa 32 d Horsham Saints 20		Horsham 55 d Horsham Saints 28	Ararat* 34 d Horsham 29	Horsham 48 d Stawell 26
2018	Horsham Saints 60 d Horsham 59	Horsham ? d Horsham Saints ?	Horsham ? d Horsham Saints ?		Horsham ? d Dimboola ?	A: Horsham ? d Ararat ? B: Horsham ? d Stawell ?	Horsham ? d Horsham Saints ?
2019	Minyip Murtoa 39 d Horsham 36	Horsham ? d Minyip Murtoa ?	Horsham ? d Ararat ?		Dimboola ? d Ararat ?	Stawell ? d Horsham ?	Horsham Saints ? d Horsham ?
2020	In recess due to the COVID-19 pandemic in Victoria						
2021	No final series due to the COVID-19 pandemic in Victoria. Minor Premiers listed below.						
	1st: Sth'n Mallee Giants	1st:	1st:	1st:	1st:	1st:	1st:
2022	Horsham Saints 34 d Horsham 29	Nhill 36 d Horsham 33	Stawell 27 d Horsham Saints 16	Horsham Saints 22 d Stawell 16	Horsham Saints 39 d Warrack Eagles 31	Horsham Saints 31 d Horsham 26	Horsham 28 d Horsham Saints 16
2023	Horsham Saints 51 d Horsham 48	Horsham 51 d Horsham Saints 34	Horsham 46 d Stawell 33	Horsham 30 d Horsham Saints 28	Horsham Saints 69 d Horsham 47	Horsham 41 d Warrack Eagles 27	Horsham Saints 73 d Stawell 17
2024	Horsham 63 d Horsham Saints 58	Stawell 45 d Horsham 42	Horsham Saints 35 d Stawell 30	Horsham Saints 41 d Horsham 40	Horsham Saints 67 d Horsham 58	Horsham Saints 38 d Horsham 25	Horsham Saints 32 d Horsham 23
2025	Horsham Saints 80 d Horsham 43	Horsham 39 d Horsham Saints 38	Horsham Saints 35 d Horsham 33	Stawell 34 d Horsham Saints 24	Horsham Saints 48 d Horsham 39	Horsham Saints 39 d Horsham 16	Horsham 45 d Stawell 19
2026	Horsham Saints 57 d Dimboola 39	Horsham 44 d Horsham Saints 33	Horsham 29 d Horsham Saints 27	Horsham 34 d Stawell 32	Horsham 48 d Horsham Saints 37	Horsham 48 d Stawell 27	Horsham Saints 40 d Minyip Murtoa 30
2027							
Year	A. Grade 1971 > present	B. Grade 1953 > present	C. Grade ? > present	C. Reserve 2021 > present	Under 17 1977 > present	15 & Unders 1995 > present	13 & Unders ? > present

== Netball Best & Fairest Awards ==
The A. Grade best and fairest award winner each season receives the Heather Hatcher Medal, in honour of a long serving volunteer and WFNL Life Member.

There are currently minimal WNA netball records available via the internet prior to 2013 when The Weekly Advertiser began to upload their digital newspaper editions.

1975–2027: A, B, C and C. Reserve Grades

Wimmera Football Netball League
Season	A-Grade (votes)	Club	B-Grade	Club	C-Grade	Club	C-Reserve	Club
1975	Gail Dunn (Dempster)	Ararat						
1976								
1977	Gail Dunn (Dempster)	Ararat						
1978								
1979	Gail Dunn (Dempster)	Ararat	Kerryn McAdie	Ararat				
1980			Maryanne McCubbin	Ararat				
1981								
1982			Jacqui McSparron	Ararat				
1983	Gayle Dadswell	Ararat						
1984								
1985								
1986								
1987								
1988								
1989			Megan Shea (Holz)	Ararat				
1990								
1991	Claire Todd	Ararat	Natalie McCulloch	Ararat				
1992			Natalie McCulloch	Ararat				
1993								
1994	Gail Dunn (Dempster)	Ararat	Terri Dalgleish	Ararat				
1995	Megan Shea (Holz)	Ararat						
1996								
1997	Megan Shea	Ararat						
1998								
1999								
2000	Megan Shea	Ararat						
2001								
2002								
2003								
2004								
2005								
2006								
2007								
2008	Jade Fiscalini	Ararat	Bree Fiscalini	Ararat				
2009	Megan Shea	Ararat	Bree Fiscalini	Ararat				
2010								
2011								
2012	Megan Shea	Ararat						
2013	Annie Noonan (19); Sarah Spicer (19)	Horsham RSL; Warrack Eagles	Mel Scott (28)	Horsham Demons	Amy Kemp (25)	Horsham Demons		
2014	Penny Fisher (27)	Warrack Eagles	Sheridan Petering (27)	Horsham	Lily McFarlene (18)	Horsham		
2015	Jemma Clarkson (20)	Stawell Warriors	Mel Scott (21)	Horsham Demons	Courtney McIlvride (28)	Stawell		
2016	Stevie Bibby (23)	Minyip Murtoa	Megan Shea (30)	Ararat	Kelly Laverty (21)	Dimboola		
2017	Emma Koschitzke (25)	Warracknabeal	Holly Ruwoldt (34)	Horsham Saints	Kristin Starick (23)	Minyip Murtoa		
2018	Emma Buwalda (27)	Horsham Demons	Courtney McIlvride (22)	Stawell	Eadie Garth (21)	Minyip Murtoa		
2019	Georgia Hiscock (29)	Horsham Demons	Stacey Arnold (25); Brianna Luciana (25)	Minyip-Murtoa; Horsham Demons	Michelle Beaton (27)	Stawell		
2020 - Wimmera FNL - In recess > COVID-19
2021 - Wimmera FNL - 12 rounds completed. No finals series due to COVID-19.
2021	Jodie Hayes (15)	Sthn Malle Giants	Abbey Greig (22)	Dimboola	Tracy Dark (21)	Stawell	Jessie Cowen (17)	Stawell
2022	Georgie Carberry (23)	Horsham Demons	Brianna Luciani (19)	Horsham Demons	Tess Thompson (28)	Ararat	Sophie Barber (19)	Stawell
2023	Abby Hallam (29)	Horsham Saints	Zeena Klem (22)	Horsham Saints	Courtney McIlvride (22)	Stawell	Georgia Baker Miller (20)	Horsham Saints
2024	Ashlee Grace (30)	Horsham Saints	Zeena Klem (26)	Horsham Saints	Leah Adams (35)	Horsham Saints	Lorinda Stewart (33)	Horsham Demons
2025	Ashlee Grace (33)	Horsham Saints	Jordan Heller (25)	Warrack Eagles	Lottie Sordello (30)	Horsham Saints	Alexandra Cameron (14); Madison Heller (14)	Stawell; Warrack Eagles
2026	Ashlee Grace (33)	Horsham Saints	Tash Noble (29)	Ararat	Chantelle Fisher (20); Aroha McKinnon (20)	Sthn Mallee Giants; Nhill	Cassie Dunlop (18)	Horsham Saints
2027								

== Underage Best & Fairest Awards ==
1977–2027: 13's & Under, 15's & Under & 17's & Under

Wimmera Football Netball League
Season	17 & Under (votes)	Club	15 & Under	Club	13 & Under	Club
1977						
1978						
1979						
1980						
1981						
1982	Donna McSparron	Ararat				
1983						
1984						
1985	Natalie McCulloch	Ararat				
1986						
1987						
1988	Jacinta Wallace	Ararat				
1989	Narissa Clark	Ararat				
1990	Tanya Smart	Ararat				
1991						
1995						
1996						
1997						
1998						
1999	Rebecca Skrabl	Ararat				
2000						
2001						
2002						
2003	Jade Fiscalini	Ararat				
2004			Catherine Dalgleish	Ararat		
2005						
2006						
2007						
2008	Georgie Eastick; Kira Payne	Ararat; Ararat	Alice Laidlaw	Ararat		
2009						
2010			Kira Stapleton	Ararat		
2011			A: ? B: ?	A: ? B: ?		
2012	Tiffany Boatman	Ararat	A: ? B: Emily Borelli	A: ? B: Ararat		
2013	Billie Jo Barber (33); Tiffany Boatman (33)	Dimboola; Ararat	A: Kiani Stewart (26); B: Angie Stoneman (26)	A: Warrack Eagles; B: Ararat	Rhiana Kuhne (29)	Dimboola
2014	Leiah McKenzie (?)	Warrack Eagles	A: Georgie Hiscock (28); B: Tessa Marra (24)	A: Horsham; B: Nhill	Tamika Mentha (28)	Horsham
2015	Kirby Griffiths (25)	Stawell	A: Monique Scott (33); B: Mackenzie Camilleri (17)	A: Ararat; B: Horsham	Tess O'Callaghan (27)	Stawell
2016	Monique Scott (?)	Ararat	A: Tamika Mentha (?); B: Madelyn Barber (?)	A: Horsham; B: Stawell	Madi Taylor (?)	Stawell
2017	Victoria Taylor (31)	Horsham Saints	Racquel Scott (36)	Ararat	Molly Orr (24); Madi Taylor (24)	Stawell; Stawell
2018	Abby Hallam (30)	Horsham Saints	A: Molly Larkin (30) & A: Racquel Scott (30); B: Kate Sleep (15)	A: Horsham; A: Ararat; B: Horsham	Imogen Worthy (25)	Horsham
2019	Racquel Scott (29)	Ararat	Grace Manserra (35)	Horsham	Nicola Clyne (30)	Warrack Eagles
2020 - Wimmera FNL - In recess > COVID-19
2021 - Wimmera FNL - 12 rounds completed. No finals series due to COVID-19
2021	Molly Orr (20)	Stawell	Charlie Inkster (20); Eva Manserra (20)	Warrack Eagles; Horsham	Sophie Hutton (17)	Stawell
2022	Jorja Clode (17); Rori Marshman (17)	Horsham Saints; Horsham Saints	Maddison Bethane (30); Lauren Clyde (30)	Horsham Saints; Warrack Eagles	Lena Marshman (32)	Horsham Saints
2023	Jorja Clode (19)	Horsham Saints	Lena Marshman (36)	Horsham Saints	Olivia Taylor (27)	Horsham Saints
2024	Taya Horman (31)	Sth'n Mallee Thunder	Lena Marshman (44)	Horsham Saints	Ruby Bethune (43)	Horsham Saints
2025	Lena Marshman (27)	Horsham Saints	Olivia Taylor (29)	Horsham Saints	Luella Burke (40)	Horsham
2026	Ruby Bethane (28); Lena Marshman (28)	Horsham Saints; Horsham Saints	Luella Burke (40)	Horsham	Mia Roberts (39)	Sth'n Mallee Thunder
2027						
Season	17 & Under (votes)	Club	15 & Under	Club	13 & Under	Club

== 2022 Ladder ==
Wimmera FL	Wins	Byes	Losses	Draws	For	Against	%	Pts	Final	Team	G	B	Pts	Team	G	B	Pts
Ararat	13	0	3	0	1471	767	191.79%	52	Elimination	Horsham	11	16	82	Dimboola	6	9	45
Minyip Murtoa	13	0	3	0	1163	815	142.70%	52	Qualifying	Minyip Murtoa	13	6	84	Stawell	6	8	44
Stawell	10	0	6	0	1248	926	134.77%	40	1st Semi	Stawell	15	15	105	Horsham	8	7	55
Horsham	8	0	8	0	1296	967	134.02%	32	2nd Semi	Minyip Murtoa	17	4	106	Ararat	11	8	74
Dimboola	11	-3	5	0	1383	1101	125.61%	32	Preliminary	Ararat	12	14	86	Stawell	7	11	53
Southern Mallee Giants	8	0	8	0	1109	1041	106.53%	32	Grand	Minyip Murtoa	8	11	59	Ararat	7	10	52
Horsham Saints	4	0	12	0	1033	1493	69.19%	16									
Warrack Eagles	4	0	12	0	896	1507	59.46%	16									
Nhill	1	0	15	0	741	1723	43.01%	4									

- Dimboola stripped of 12 points for player payment breaches in 2021

== 2023 Ladder ==
Wimmera FL	Wins	Byes	Losses	Draws	For	Against	%	Pts	Final	Team	G	B	Pts	Team	G	B	Pts
Ararat	16	0	0	0	1650	599	275.46%	64	Elimination	Dimboola	13	7	85	Minyip Murtoa	11	9	75
Horsham Saints	12	0	4	0	1273	1027	123.95%	48	Qualifying	Southern Mallee Giants	16	10	106	Horsham Saints	5	4	34
Southern Mallee Giants	11	0	5	0	1410	948	148.73%	44	1st Semi	Horsham Saints	17	13	115	Dimboola	10	15	75
Minyip Murtoa	10	0	6	0	961	961	100.00%	40	2nd Semi	Southern Mallee Giants	14	13	97	Ararat	11	7	73
Dimboola	8	0	8	0	1221	1230	99.27%	32	Preliminary	Ararat	25	21	171	Horsham Saints	9	7	61
Stawell	8	0	8	0	933	1150	81.13%	32	Grand	Ararat	10	13	73	Southern Mallee Giants	6	16	52
Nhill	3	0	12	1	919	1173	78.35%	14									
Horsham	2	0	13	1	844	1453	58.09%	10									
Warrack Eagles	1	0	15	0	735	1405	52.31%	4									

== 2024 Ladder ==
Wimmera FL	Wins	Byes	Losses	Draws	For	Against	%	Pts	Final	Team	G	B	Pts	Team	G	B	Pts
Southern Mallee Thunder	14	0	2	0	1626	782	207.93%	56	Elimination	Nhill	11	14	80	Horsham	11	7	73
Ararat	13	0	2	1	1757	928	189.33%	54	Qualifying	Ararat	14	14	98	Stawell	6	6	42
Stawell	11	0	5	0	1260	965	130.57%	44	1st Semi	Stawell	8	9	57	Nhill	7	7	49
Horsham	9	0	7	0	1311	1156	113.41%	36	2nd Semi	Ararat	17	10	112	Southern Mallee	12	6	78
Nhill	8	0	7	1	1306	1183	110.40%	34	Preliminary	Southern Mallee	13	12	90	Stawell	5	10	40
Minyip Murtoa	6	0	10	0	1168	1306	89.43%	24	Grand	Ararat	11	11	77	Southern Mallee	9	14	68
Horsham Saints	6	0	10	0	1072	1322	81.09%	24									
Dimboola	3	0	13	0	898	1593	56.37%	12									
Warrack Eagles	1	0	15	0	766	1929	39.71%	4									

== 2025 Ladder ==
Wimmera FL	Wins	Byes	Losses	Draws	For	Against	%	Pts	Final	Team	G	B	Pts	Team	G	B	Pts
Ararat	16	0	0	0	2007	665	301.80%	64	Elimination	Dimboola	16	18	114	Stawell	15	10	100
Nhill	11	0	5	0	1212	1195	101.42%	44	Qualifying	Southern Mallee Thunder	16	9	105	Nhill	6	12	48
Southern Mallee Thunder	10	0	6	0	1421	1188	119.61%	40	1st Semi	Nhill	10	7	67	Dimboola	9	9	63
Stawell	10	0	6	0	1319	1298	101.62%	40	2nd Semi	Southern Mallee Thunder	11	14	80	Ararat	11	7	73
Dimboola	8	0	8	0	1262	1262	100.00%	32	Preliminary	Ararat	19	15	129	Nhill	11	6	72
Minyip Murtoa	7	0	9	0	1205	1265	95.26%	28	Grand	Ararat	13	13	91	Southern Mallee Thunder	5	8	38
Horsham Saints	6	0	10	0	1010	1347	74.98%	24									
Warrack Eagles	3	0	13	0	874	1294	67.54%	12									
Horsham	1	0	15	0	1014	1810	56.02%	4									

== Publication ==
Wheatbelt Warriors. A Tribute To Wimmera Football League.
