= Hedt =

Hedt or HEDT may refer to:

- Ken Hedt (1936–2006), Australian rules football player
- High-end desktop computer, a type of desktop computer, such as Core Extreme, Threadripper, and Xeon-W/X.
