= Billy Schmidt =

Australian rules footballer and coach

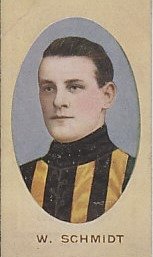
- Cigarette card of Schmidt in 1910

Personal information
- Full name: Louis William Schmidt
- Born: 29 December 1887; Richmond, Victoria
- Died: 23 October 1975 (aged 87); Malvern, Victoria
- Original team: Balmain Juniors
- Debut: Round 1, 1908, Richmond vs. Melbourne
- Height: 170 cm (5 ft 7 in)
- Weight: 70 kg (154 lb)

Playing career^{1}
| Years | Club | Games (Goals) |
| 1907 | Richmond VFA) | 4 (6) |
| 1908–11 | Richmond VFL) | 71 (69) |
| 1912–14; 1918–20 | St Kilda (VFL) | 90 (77) |
| 1921 | Richmond (VFL) | 4 (2) |
| Total | | 165 (148) |

Coaching career
| Years | Club | Games (W–L–D) |
| 1933 | Richmond (VFL) | 21 (16–5–0) |
- ^{1} Playing statistics correct to the end of 1921.

Career highlights
- Richmond captain: 1910; Interstate games: 12

Louis William Schmidt (29 December 1887 – 23 October 1975) was an Australian rules footballer who played for the Richmond Football Club in the Victorian Football Association (VFA) in 1907 then in the Victorian Football League (VFL) from 1908 to 1911, and again in 1921. He played for the St Kilda Football Club between 1912 and 1914, and again from 1918 until 1920.

== Football ==
"William was a centreman. Recruited from the local Richmond area, he quickly developed into one of the best centreman of his era. A consistently high possession winner, he had great pace, brilliant evasive skills and was a magnificent kick."

=== Richmond (VFA) ===
He played in the last four games (6 goals) of the 1907 VFA season for Richmond — the team's last season in the VFA — including its Semi-Final loss to West Melbourne.

=== Richmond (VFL) ===
He played in Richmond's first match in the VFL competition, against Melbourne, at the Punt Road Oval, on 2 May 1908. He went on to play 71 VFL games (69 goals) over four seasons: 1908 to 1911 (he was the team's captain in 1910).

=== St Kilda (VFL) ===
In 1913, Schmidt kicked a goal after the siren to destroy Carlton's chances of making the finals; it is the first recorded instance of a VFL player kicking a goal after the siren to win the match. Schmidt, who was known for his accurate kicking using either the drop kick or the place kick, steered the ball through the goals from 45 yards. He was a member of the St Kilda team that lost the 1913 VFL Grand Final to Fitzroy.

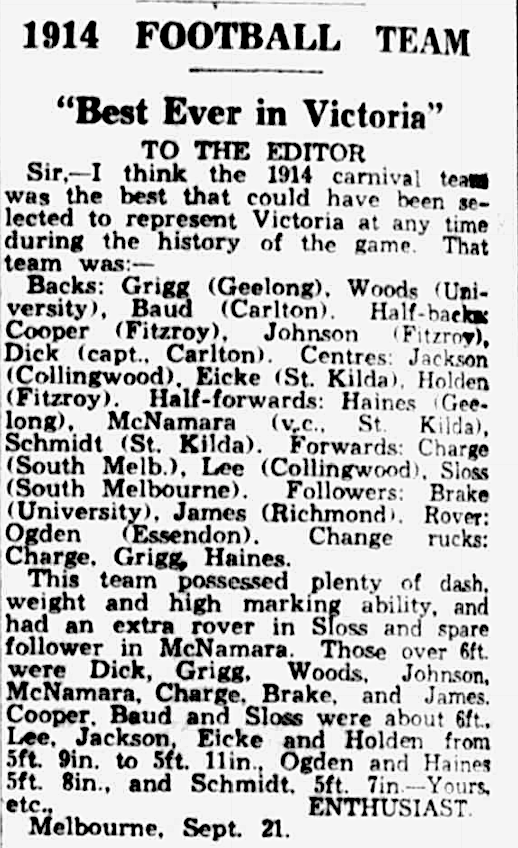
Enthusiast's Letter to the Editor The Herald, 21 Sept. 1934.

At the end of 1914 season, Schmidt was found guilty of striking Les Fairbairn of Geelong and was suspended for the first 10 rounds of the 1915 season. Schmidt was later reprimanded for swearing at a steward after the tribunal. Schmidt opted not to play that year and the following two years St Kilda were in recess because of the war. In 1918 St Kilda recommenced and so did Billy.

=== Warracknabeal Football Club (WFL) ===
Schmidt became closely aligned with the Warracknabeal Football Club in the Wimmera Football League. He was first lured to the town mid-season in 1919 with an offer to coach for the rest of the year. He was still coaching Warracknabeal during the week when he returned to play for St. Kilda in the 1920 season.

He again crossed back to Richmond in 1921 but he realised he was getting too old for the VFL standard required and he returned to Warracknabeal.

Cleared from Richmond he help Warracknabeal to the premiership. Locals considered him responsible for raising the level of play across the Wimmera. He led the town to three premierships between 1921 and 1930.

=== North Gambier (SEFA) ===
In 1932 he took up an offer to serve as the non-playing coach of the North Gambier Football Club, in the South-Eastern Football Association, after it had a poor start to the season. He got the team to lift to finish third for the year.

=== Richmond (VFL) ===
He then coached Richmond for one season, 1933, where they lost the Grand Final to South Melbourne. The following year Richmond appointed their club captain, Percy Bentley, as playing coach to ward off outside clubs offers.

=== Minyip (WFL) ===
Schmidt returned to the Wimmera, where he had set up a business. He coached Minyip in 1934, and they won the Mid Wimmera FL premiership. The Wimmera FL had split in 1932, and the larger clubs were playing in a Ballarat base competition. In 1939, he was re-appointed coach of Minyip Football Club.

== Death ==
He died at Malvern, Victoria, on 23 October 1975.

== See also ==
- 1914 Sydney Carnival
