= Eric Huxtable =

Australian rules footballer, born 1908

Personal information
- Full name: Eric Francis Huxtable
- Born: 27 October 1908; Hobart, Tasmania
- Died: 10 October 1990 (aged 81); Melton, Victoria
- Original team: New Town
- Height: 182 cm (6 ft 0 in)
- Weight: 80 kg (176 lb)
- Position: Defender

Playing career^{1}
Years	Club	Games (Goals)
1930–38	Carlton	135 (4)
1939	Yarram	? (?)
1940	Dimboola	? (?)
1941–42	South Melbourne	22 (1)
Total		157 (5)
- ^{1} Playing statistics correct to the end of 1942.

Eric Francis Huxtable (27 October 1908 – 10 October 1990) was an Australian rules footballer who played for Carlton in the VFL during the 1930s and briefly with South Melbourne in the early 1940s.

== Family ==
The youngest of the six children of James Huxtable (1867–1910), and Annie Martha Huxtable (1873-1940), née Connolly, Eric Francis Huxtable was born in Hobart, Tasmania on 27 October 1908.

He married Gwynneth Grace Fawcett (1914-1998) in May 1935. They had six children, Neil, Gary, Erin, Margo, Christine, and Julie.

== Education ==
He attended St Virgil's College, in Hobart.

== Football ==
Huxtable commenced his football journey at just 15 years old with the Tasmanian club New Town, winning their 'Best and fairest' award in 1928.

Moving to the mainland in 1930, he joined Carlton and swiftly established himself as a key member of their defence for the ensuing decade. Renowned for his exceptional long drop kicks, Huxtable demonstrated prowess on the field, notably holding his own against triple Brownlow Medal winner Haydn Bunton. His consistent performance earned him regular selection for the VFL representative team. Throughout his tenure at Carlton, Huxtable consistently contributed to the team's finals campaigns, including the 1932 VFL Grand Final loss to Richmond. Although his final season with Carlton culminated in a premiership victory, Huxtable's participation was thwarted by a thumb injury.

Following his departure from Carlton, Huxtable was captain-coach of 1939 Gippsland Football League premiers, Yarram and 1940 Wimmera Football League runners up, Dimboola, before resuming his VFL career in 1941 with South Melbourne.

Huxtable was later enlisted with the Royal Australian Air Force (RAAF) between 1942 and 1960.

== Death ==
He died at Melton, Victoria on 10 October 1990.
