= Russell Crow =

Russell Crow may refer to:

- Russell Crowe (born 1964), New Zealand actor, film producer, and musician
- Russell Crow (footballer) (born 1941), Australian former VFL player
