= Arthur Hart =

Arthur Hart may refer to:

- Arthur Hart (footballer, born 1905) (1905–1989), Australian rules footballer for St Kilda
- Arthur Hart (footballer, born 1917) (1917–1981), Australian rules footballer for Fitzroy
- Arthur FitzRoy Hart-Synnot (1844–1910), British Army general
- Arthur Hart-Synnot (1870–1942), British Army general
- "Arthur Hart", fictional character in the American TV series WandaVision
