= Harry Kuhl =

Australian rules footballer, born 1903

Personal information
- Full name: Harry Kuhl
- Born: 7 March 1903; Mount Gambier, South Australia
- Died: 11 January 1967 (aged 63); Stawell, Victoria
- Original team: Dimboola
- Height: 170 cm (5 ft 7 in)
- Weight: 74.5 kg (164 lb)

Playing career^{1}
Years	Club	Games (Goals)
1922-1923	Port Adelaide	4 (1)
1926	St Kilda	12 (7)
- ^{1} Playing statistics correct to the end of 1926.

Harry Kuhl (7 March 1903 – 11 January 1967) was an Australian rules footballer who played with Port Adelaide in the South Australian National Football League (SANFL) and St Kilda in the Victorian Football League (VFL). Originally from the Dimboola Football Club, his son Jim Kuhl played for North Melbourne in the 1940s.

Kuhl was captain-coach of Dimboola from 1930 to 1932.

== Sources ==
- Holmesby, Russell & Main, Jim (2007). The Encyclopedia of AFL Footballers. 7th ed. Melbourne: Bas Publishing.
