= Dimboola Football Club =

Dimboola FNC

Names
- Full name: Dimboola Football Netball Club Inc
- Nickname: Roos

2025 season
- After finals: 4th
- Home-and-away season: 5th
- Leading goalkicker: Jackson Calder (62)
- Best and fairest: Ben Miller

Club details
- Founded: 1881; 145 years ago
- Colours: green & gold
- Competition: Wimmera Football League
- President: James Barry
- Captain: Ben Miller
- Premierships: (18): 1892, 1893, 1907, 1909, 1913, 1920, 1921 x2, 1922, 1928, 1929, 1933, 1935, 1937, 1946, 1959, 1985, 2013
- Ground: Dimboola Recreation Reserve, (capacity: 5,000)

Uniforms
Home

Other information
- Official website: Dimboola FNC

The Dimboola Football Club, nicknamed the Roos, is an Australian rules football and netball club based in the town of Dimboola, Victoria. The football team competes in the Wimmera Football League (WFL).

== History ==
The Dimboola FC was founded in 1881 and in 1882 they played a match against the Horsham Union FC in Horsham, which resulted in a draw.

In 1907, the Dimboola Rovers (8.7 - 55) defeated Wallup (2.4 - 16) in the grand final of the Dimboola & District Combined Trophy.

In 1921, Dimboola FC played in two local football competitions, the Western Wimmera FA (Wednesday competition) and the Northern Wimmera FA (Saturday competition) and remarkably Dimboola won both association premierships. Details below.

Dimboola joined the Wimmera District Football League in 1923 and former Geelong player, Bert Rankin was appointed as captain-coach in 1924.

In 1932 during the height of the Great depression the small town clubs suffering from financial pressures tried to get the league to change the way the gate taking were distributed to the clubs. The larger town clubs, knowing that they would be disadvantaged, blocked the motion. Nhill and Dimboola both went into recess.

In 1933 Dimboola was back, it formed the Mid Wimmera FL with Minyip, Murtoa, Nhill and Rupanyip. It won the 1933 and 1935 premierships.

While the WDFL approached the Ballarat Football League to merge hoping that greater interest and better football would cause larger gate takings, so in 1934 the Wimmera Football League and the Ballarat Football League merged to form the Ballarat Wimmera FL.

After three years in which the Wimmera clubs faced with greater costs and constantly losing on the footy field, feelers were put out to the smaller clubs, now playing in the Mid Wimmera FL. A peace deal was settled in September 1936 and the Wimmera Football League was reformed in 1937 making it a nine team competition, with former Essendon player, Alan Arthur appointed as captain-coach in 1937.

The local Marks aboriginal family were all outstanding footballers and cricketers, with Alf Senior and Fisher Marks playing in the early 1900's and Alf's son, Alf Junior, was the leading goal kicker in the Wimmera Football League in 19??.

== Football Timeline ==
Seniors

- 1881 - 1888: Club active, but no official competition football
- 1889 - Rauert - Rintoule Trophy (Dimboola, Horsham, Kaniva & Nhill)
- 1890 - James Laing Trophy (Dimboola, Horsham, Nhill & Stawell)
- 1891 - Club active, but no official competition football
- 1892 - Meredith Trophy (Dimboola, Horsham Federals, Jung Jung, Murtoa, Natimuk & Longerenong College)
- 1893 - J S Nelson Cup (Dimboola, Horsham, Kaniva, Nhill & Stawell)
- 1894 - 1895: Club active, but no official competition football.
- 1896 - Father O'Brien Trophy (Dimboola, Horsham Federals, Longerenong College & Natimuk)
- 1897 - Club active, but no official competition football
- 1898 - Wimmera DFA
- 1899 - 1900: Club active, but no official competition football
- 1901 - Dimboola Licensed Victualers Trophy (Dimboola, Horsham & Nhill)
- 1902 - 1903: Club active, but no official competition football
- 1904 - Wimmera District Junior Football Association & Langlands Sacks Trophy
- 1905 - Wimmera District Junior Football Association (Rennison Jewellers Trophy)
- 1906 - Wimmera District Junior Football Association (Butt Trophy)
- 1907 - Nhill & District Football Association & the Dimboola & District Combined Trophy
- 1908 - Wimmera District Football Association
- 1909 - Cordner Medals
- 1910 - Horsham Brewery Trophy & Pimpinio Jagger Junior Trophy
- 1911 - Dimboola Rainbow Medals
- 1912 - North West Wimmera Football Association
- 1913 - Wimmera Football Association & the West Wimmera Football Association
- 1914 - Dimboola Jeparit Rainbow Football Association

Dimboola FC - Reserves

- 1922 - West Wimmera FL: Premiers
- 1927 - North Wimmera FL
- 1928 - 1930: West Wimmera FL
- 1931 - 1932: Central Wimmera FL
- 1933 - Central Wimmera FL / Dimboola FL
- 1934 - 1935: Dimboola FL
- 1936 - 1937: Horsham District FL
- 1938 - 1940: Central Wimmera FL (Dimboola 2nds)
- 1941 - 1945: Club in recess
- 1946 - Central Wimmera FL (Dimboola 2nds)
- 1947 - Lowen Star FL

== Football Premierships ==
Seniors

- Meredith Saloon (Horsham) Trophy
  - 1892 - 1st: Dimboola 2nd: Horsham Federals
- J "Soddy" Nelson Cup
  - 1893
- Nhill & District Football Trophy
  - 1907 - Dimboola: 70 d Kaniva: 10 (undefeated premiers)
- Cordner Medals
  - 1909 - Dimboola: 5.7 - 37 d Jeparit: 3.10 - 28
- Western Wimmera Football Association
  - 1913 - Dimboola: 4.3 - 27 d Nhill: 3.3 - 21,
  - 1920 - Dimboola: 8.19 - 67 d Nhill: 3.8 - 26
  - 1921 - Dimboola: 9.12 - 66 d Kaniva: 8.13 - 61 at Nhill
  - 1922 - Dimboola: 10.14 - 74 d Gerang: 6.11 - 47 at Dimboola
- Northern Wimmera Football Association
  - 1921 - Dimboola d Gerang at Dimboola
- Wimmera District Football League
  - 1928 - Dimboola: 9.16 - 70 d Horsham: 8.11 - 59
  - 1929 - Dimboola: 9.9 - 63 d Nhill: 5.13 - 43
- Mid Wimmera Football League
  - 1933 - Dimboola: 15.11 - 101 d Murtoa: 9.11 - 65 at Murtoa
  - 1935 - Dimboola: 10.14 - 74 d Minyip: 7.6 - 48 at Dimboola
- Wimmera Football League
  - 1937 - Dimboola: 15.14 - 104 d Stawell: 13.15 - 93 at Horsham
  - 1946 - Dimboola: 17.16 - 118 d Warracknabeal: 10.13 - 73 at Horsham
  - 1959 - Dimboola: 7.12 - 54 d Warracknabeal: 7.11 - 53 at Horsham
  - 1985 - Dimboola: 11.14 - 80 d Horsham: 9.12 - 66 at Warracknabeal
  - 2013 - Dimboola: 16.15 - 111 d Horsham Saints: 7.13 - 55 at Nhill

Reserves

- Horsham District Football League
  - 1937 - Dimboola 2nds: 12.13 - 84 d Laharum: 7.13 - 55
- Wimmera Football League
  - 1983, 1985, 2014

Thirds

- North Wimmera Football Association
  - 1950 - Dimboola: ? d Jeparit: ?
- Wimmera Football League
  - Under 16's
    - 1966, 1967, 1968, 1971, 1972, 1975, 1981

== Netball Premierships ==
A. Grade

- 1957 - Dimboola: 23 d Horsham: 16

B. Grade

- ?

C. Grade

- ?

C. Reserve

- ?

== League Best & Fairest ==
Seniors

- Wimmera & District Football League
  - 1931 - Les Schneider: 7 votes
- Mid Wimmera Football League
  - 1935 - Les Schneider: 7 votes
- Wimmera Football League - Toohey Medal
  - 1972 - Norm Watson
  - 2005 - Peter McFarlene
  - 2013 - Justin Chilver

== VFL / AFL Players ==
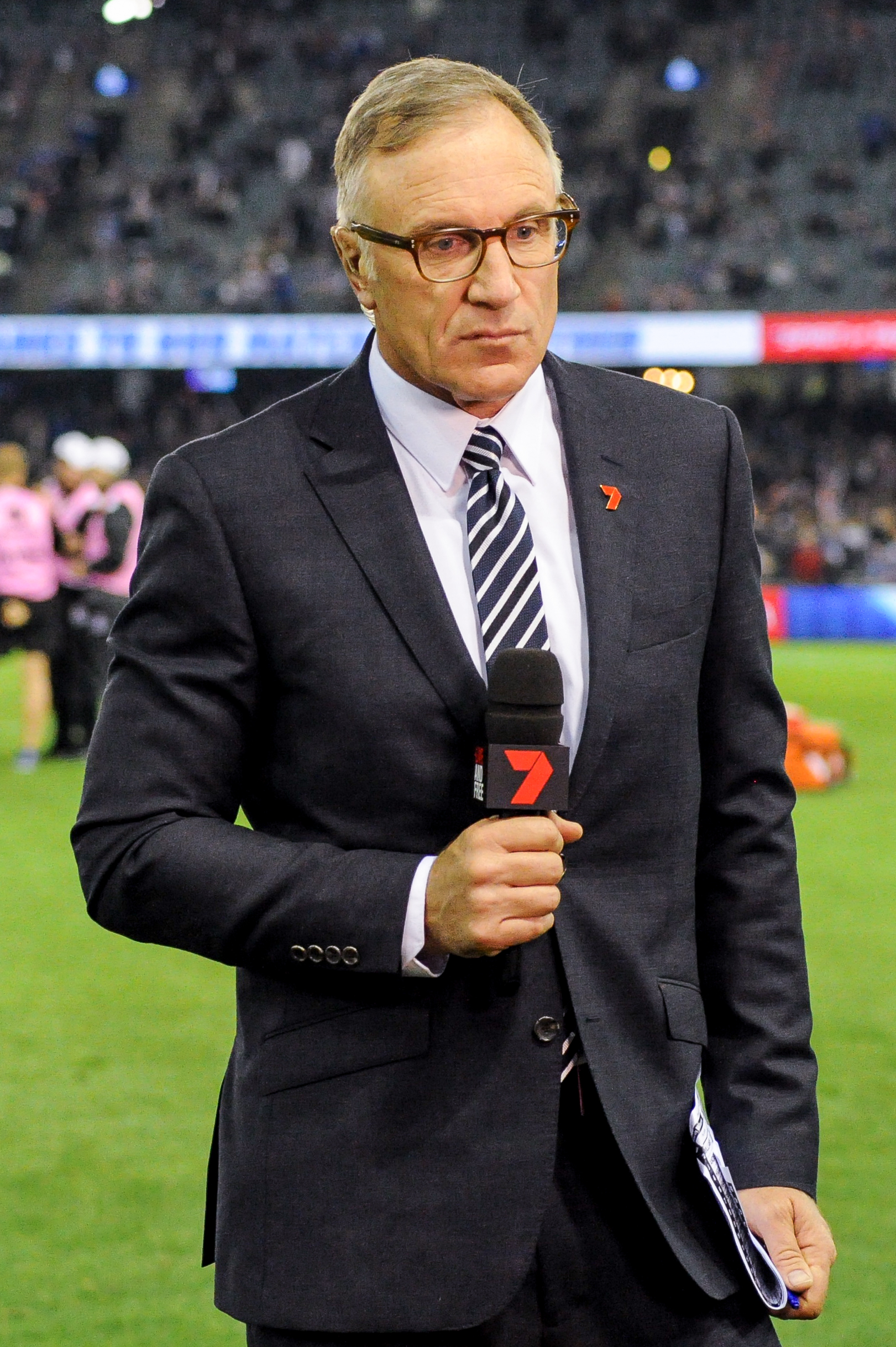
Tim Watson, 2017

The following footballers played with Dimboola, prior to playing senior football in the VFL/AFL, and / or drafted, with the year indicating their VFL/AFL debut.

- 1920 - Ernest Mucklow - Port Adelaide
- 1925 - Bill Koop - Carlton
- 1926 - Harry Kuhl - St Kilda
- 1927 - Jack Baggott - Richmond
- 1928 - Peter Brown - North Melbourne
- 1962 - Darryl Howland - South Melbourne
- 1975 - Larry Watson - Essendon, Fitzroy
- 1977 - Merv Neagle - Essendon
- 1977 - Tim Watson - Essendon
- 1980 - Peter Light - Essendon
- 1983 - Wayne Beddison - Essendon
- 2010 - Andrew Moore - Port Adelaide, Richmond
- 2013 - Brett Goodes – Western Bulldogs

The following footballers played senior VFL / AFL football prior to playing and / or coaching with Dimboola with the year indicating their first season at DFNC.

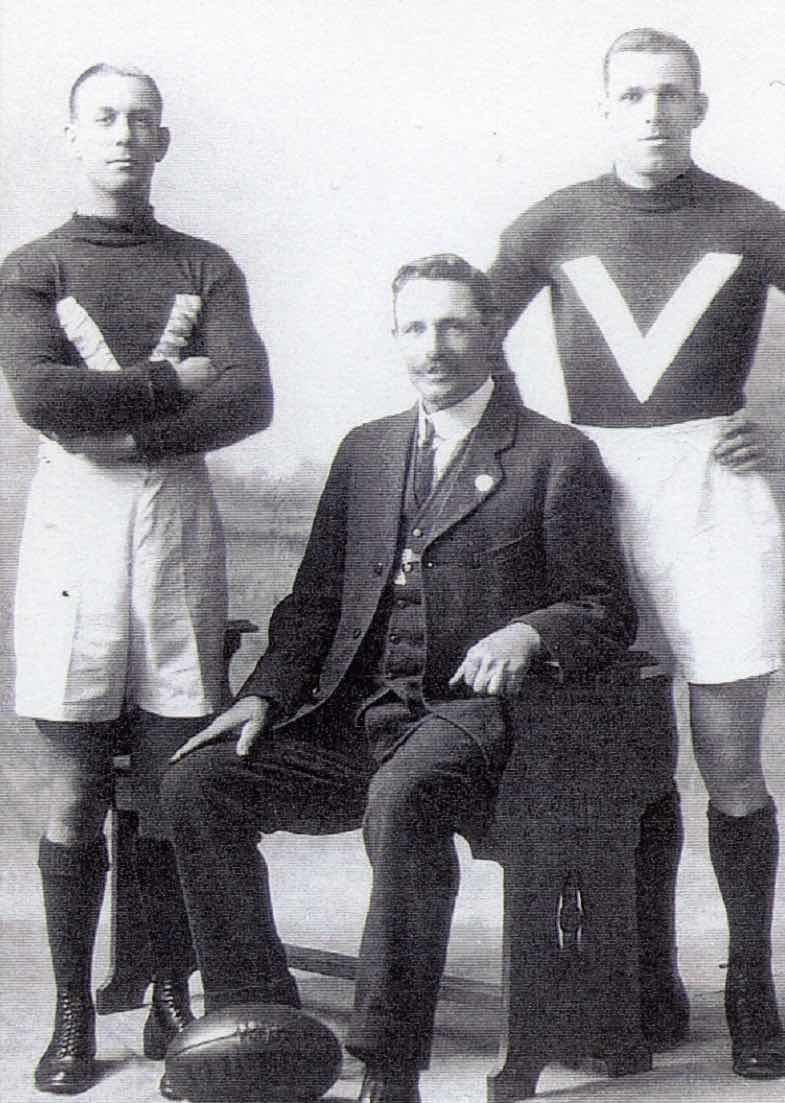
Cliff, Teddy & Bert Rankin: Geelong & Victorian footballers

- 1924 - Bert Rankin - Geelong
- 1925 - Les Bryant - Fitzroy
- 1928 - George Arnott - Hawthorn
- 1928 - Leo Wescott - Collingwood
- 1937 - Alan Arthur - Essendon
- 1938 - Eric Little - Carlton
- 1940 - Eric Huxtable - Carlton
- 1946 - Keith Smith - South Melbourne
- 1968 - Keith Bromage - Collingwood

== Leading Goalkicker ==
- Wimmera & District Football League
  - 1927 - Jimmy Lawson: 93
  - 1928 - Jimmy Lawson: 72
  - 1929 - Jimmy Lawson: 63
  - 1930 - Jimmy Lawson: 82

Dimboola played in the grand final in 1927, 1928, 1929 and 1930, winning premierships in 1928 and 1929, thanks to the goalkicking feats of Jimmy Lawson.

- Wimmera Football League
  - 1968 - Keith Bromage: 98
  - 2012 - Lachlan Exell: 78 (86)
  - 2013 - Lachlan Exell: 72 (79)
  - 2014 - Lachlan Exell: 68
  - 2015 - Ashley Clugston: 53

Most goals in a match

In 1927, Dimboola's champion forward, Jimmy Lawson kicked 20 goals against Murtoa. 18 year old Lawson also kicked 11 goals on debut for Dimboola in the last game of the year in 1925. Lawson had also kicked 60 goals for Pimpinio FC in 1925.

== Bibliography ==
Wheatbelt Warriors. A Tribute To Wimmera Football League.
