= Peter Brown (Australian footballer, born 1906) =

Australian rules footballer, born 1906

Personal information
- Full name: Peter J. Brown
- Born: 9 October 1906
- Died: 1 January 1988 (aged 81)
- Original team: Dimboola

Playing career^{1}
Years	Club	Games (Goals)
1928	North Melbourne	9 (7)
- ^{1} Playing statistics correct to the end of 1928.

Peter Brown (9 October 1906 – 1 January 1988) was an Australian rules footballer who played for North Melbourne in the Victorian Football League (VFL) in 1928.
