= Bob Dunlop (footballer) =

Australian rules footballer

Personal information
- Full name: Robert Leonard Dunlop
- Born: 8 December 1935
- Died: 24 March 2026 (aged 90)
- Original team: Rupanyup (Wimmera FL)
- Height: 192 cm (6 ft 4 in)
- Weight: 89 kg (196 lb)
- Positions: Follower, forward

Playing career^{1}
| Years | Club | Games (Goals) |
| 1960–61 | Essendon | 27 (28) |
- ^{1} Playing statistics correct to the end of 1961.

Robert Leonard Dunlop (8 December 1935 – 24 March 2026) was an Australian rules footballer who played with Essendon in the Victorian Football League (VFL).

Dunlop won the Wimmera Football League's best and fairest award, the Toohey Medal in 1958 and 1959, then won Essendon's best first year player award in 1960, after playing every match in his first year before returning to his original side, Rupanyup, in 1962.

Dunlop was a member of Rupanyup's 1963 premiership team.
