= Graeme Clyne =

Australian rules footballer (1941–2024)

Personal information
- Full name: Graeme Clyne
- Born: 21 July 1941
- Died: 4 September 2024 (aged 83)
- Original team: Warracknabeal
- Height: 188 cm (6 ft 2 in)
- Weight: 86 kg (190 lb)

Playing career^{1}
Years	Club	Games (Goals)
1962	Fitzroy	6 (0)
- ^{1} Playing statistics correct to the end of 1962.

Graeme Clyne (21 July 1941 – 4 September 2024) was an Australian rules footballer who played with Fitzroy in the Victorian Football League (VFL).

Clyne won the Wimmera Football League best and fairest award, the Toohey Medal in 1965 and 1966, representing Warracknabeal FC.

Clyne died on 4 September 2024, at the age of 83.
