= Ken Roberts (footballer, born 1925) =

Australian rules footballer

Personal information
- Full name: Kenneth Edward Roberts
- Born: 3 June 1925; Richmond, Victoria
- Died: 21 October 2008 (aged 83); East Albury, New South Wales
- Original team: Richmond United
- Height: 180 cm (5 ft 11 in)
- Weight: 73 kg (161 lb)
- Position: Half back

Playing career^{1}
| Years | Club | Games (Goals) |
| 1947–51 | Richmond | 58 (0) |
- ^{1} Playing statistics correct to the end of 1951.

Kenneth Edward Roberts (3 June 1925 – 21 October 2008) was an Australian rules footballer who played with Richmond in the Victorian Football League (VFL).

Prior to playing with Richmond, Roberts served in the Australian Army during World War II.

Roberts was captain-coach of Minyip from 1952 to 1954 and led them to the 1952 and 1954 Wimmera Football League premierships and were runners up in 1953.

Roberts was captain-coach of Millicent from 1955 to 1957, leading them to South East & Border Football League premierships in 1955 and 1956.

His son Ken junior played with Essendon and Melbourne in the late 1970s.
