= Jim Kuhl =

Australian rules footballer

Personal information
- Full name: James Henry Kuhl
- Born: 27 September 1925; Dimboola, Victoria
- Died: 8 May 2017 (aged 91); Springsure, Queensland
- Original team: Geelong West

Playing career^{1}
Years	Club	Games (Goals)
1947–48	North Melbourne	10 (0)
- ^{1} Playing statistics correct to the end of 1948.

James Henry Kuhl (27 September 1925 – 8 May 2017) was an Australian rules footballer who played with North Melbourne. His father Harry Kuhl played for St Kilda in the 1920s.

== Sources ==
- Holmesby, Russell & Main, Jim (2007). The Encyclopedia of AFL Footballers. 7th ed. Melbourne: Bas Publishing.
