= Mick Sibun =

Australian rules footballer

Personal information
- Full name: Gray Rothwell Sibun
- Nickname: Mick
- Born: 2 April 1929; Melbourne, Victoria
- Died: 1 May 2011 (aged 82); Geelong, Victoria
- Original team: South Melbourne Under-19s
- Height: 173 cm (5 ft 8 in)
- Weight: 70 kg (154 lb)
- Positions: Rover, half-forward flanker

Playing career^{1}
Years	Club	Games (Goals)
1950–56	South Melbourne	111 (88)
1957-63	Rupanyup	133 (?)
- ^{1} Playing statistics correct to the end of 1956.

Career highlights
- South Melbourne vice-captain; Wimmera FL Premiership Captain-Coach: 1961 & 63

Gray Rothwell "Mick" Sibun (12 April 1929 – 1 May 2011) was an Australian rules footballer who played for South Melbourne Football Club in the Victorian Football League (VFL) between 1950 and 1956, mainly as a rover and half-forward flanker. He also played interstate football for Victoria. Sibun grew up in Albert Park, Victoria, which at the time fell into South Melbourne's recruitment zone. Along with Bob Giles, Sibun played for South Melbourne Under-19s. He made his debut for South Melbourne in Round 1 of the 1950 season, kicking two goals on debut in a match the Swans won by 20 points. Sibun played mainly as a half-forward flanker, kicking 88 goals in his 111-game VFL career, with a best of four goals, which he recorded twice - once in 1953 against Collingwood, and once in 1954, against Carlton

After the 1956 season, Sibun left the VFL to become playing-coach at Rupanyup in the Wimmera Football League (WFL). He captained-coached the club to its first premiership in 1961, and to another in 1963. In total he played 133 games for Rupanyup. He is considered by some to be the best footballer to ever play in the WFL.

== See also ==
- List of South Melbourne Football Club players
