= Stuart Cameron (footballer) =

Australian rules footballer

Personal information
- Full name: Stuart Cameron
- Born: 12 February 1964 (age 62)
- Original team: Minyip (WFL)
- Height: 188 cm (6 ft 2 in)
- Weight: 85 kg (187 lb)

Playing career^{1}
Years	Club	Games (Goals)
1986–1989	Fitzroy	13 (2)
1990	Melbourne	5 (1)
Total		18 (3)
- ^{1} Playing statistics correct to the end of 1990.

Stuart Cameron (born 12 February 1964) is a former Australian rules footballer who played with Fitzroy and Melbourne in the Victorian/Australian Football League (VFL/AFL).

Cameron came to Melbourne from Minyip, in the Wimmera Football League. He played just 13 senior games for Fitzroy, nine of them coming in the second half of the 1987 season. After not making an appearance in 1989, Melbourne selected him in the 1990 Pre-Season Draft. He played five games for Melbourne in 1990.
