= Alan Arthur (footballer) =

Australian rules footballer, born 1905

Personal information
- Full name: Alan Graham Arthur
- Born: 12 November 1905; Bendigo, Victoria
- Died: 9 August 1979 (aged 73); Prahran, Victoria
- Original team: Sandhurst
- Height: 183 cm (6 ft 0 in)
- Weight: 76 kg (168 lb)

Playing career^{1}
Years	Club	Games (Goals)
1928, 1930	Essendon	30 (54)
- ^{1} Playing statistics correct to the end of 1930.

Career highlights
- 1929, 1931 Bendigo FL premiership: Sandhurst FC; 1937 Wimmera FL Premiership captain-coach

Alan Graham Arthur (12 November 1905 – 9 August 1979) was an Australian rules footballer who played thirty games for Essendon in 1928 and 1930 in the Victorian Football League (now the AFL).

Arthur played thirty games and kicked fifty-four goals for Essendon, debuting against Geelong in round 4, 1928 and playing his final game against Collingwood in round 18, 1930.

Originally from the Sandhurst Football Club, he returned there after leaving Essendon, before playing and coaching at Golden Square and was captain-coach of Dimboola's 1937 Wimmera Football League premiership team.

He then moved to South Australia to coach Norwood in the South Australian National Football League in 1938 for two years.

He was the father of Graham Arthur who captained and coached the Hawthorn Football Club.
