= Trevor Tyler =

Australian rules footballer

Personal information
- Full name: Trevor W. Tyler
- Born: 29 September 1952 (age 74)
- Original team: Rupanyup (Wimmera FL)
- Height: 183 cm (6 ft 0 in)
- Weight: 84 kg (185 lb)
- Positions: Defender, ruck-rover

Playing career^{1}
Years	Club	Games (Goals)
1973–76	Essendon	12 (0)
- ^{1} Playing statistics correct to the end of 1976.

Trevor Tyler (born 29 September 1952) is a former Australian rules footballer who played with Essendon in the Victorian Football League (VFL). He later played for Bayswater and Boronia.
