= Graeme Schultz =

Australian rules footballer

Personal information
- Full name: Graeme William Schultz
- Born: 17 May 1953 (age 73)
- Original team: Warracknabeal
- Height: 180 cm (5 ft 11 in)
- Weight: 69 kg (152 lb)

Playing career^{1}
Years	Club	Games (Goals)
1971–1974	Essendon	58 (80)
1975–1981	Subiaco	85 (137)
1981–1983	Essendon	19 (35)
1984	Footscray	0 (0)
1984	Camberwell	6 (15)
1985–1987	Maryborough	? (?)
1988	Keilor	? (?)
Total		168 (267)
- ^{1} Playing statistics correct to the end of 1984.

Career highlights
- 1970 – Wimmera FNL/Warracknabeal FC: 122 goals; 1979 – Subiaco FC leading goalkicker: 38 goals; 1983 – VFL Reserves Premiership: Essendon FC; 1988 – Essendon DFL Premiership: Keilor FC

Graeme William Schultz (born 17 May 1953) is a former Australian rules footballer who played with Essendon in the Victorian Football League (VFL).

Schultz was a forward and rover, recruited to Essendon from Warracknabeal in the Wimmera Football League, where he kicked 122 goals in 1970 and played in Warracknabeal's losing 1970 grand final side. He kicked four goals on his league debut in 1971, against Hawthorn, which helped him to a season tally of 29 goals; this was just two behind the club's leading goalkicker that year, Alan Noonan. His 16 games in 1974 were deemed to be some of his best, as he finished third in the W. S. Crichton Medal count.

He made the decision to move to Western Australia after the 1974 season, for study purposes, but Essendon initially refused to grant him a clearance, which meant he could not play in the WANFL. They later gave in, and he played the second half of the 1975 season for Subiaco. Despite appearing in just 12 games, Schultz almost won the Sandover Medal, finishing only four votes behind winner Alan Quartermaine.

After six more seasons at Subiaco, Schultz was convinced by new Essendon coach Kevin Sheedy to return to the VFL in 1981. In his first season back, he played in the 1981 Night Premiership and bettered his previous season's goal tally by kicking 30 league goals, including a game in which he kicked three goals in the opening ten minutes against Richmond in Round 13 at Windy Hill, rounded off by taking a courageous mark going back with the flight of the ball to kick the match-winning goal; President Greg Sewell described Schultz's game as "the best at Windy Hill for twenty years".

Injury kept him to five games in 1982, and in his first appearance of the 1983 VFL season, against St Kilda, he broke his leg. He did not play another VFL game for Essendon, but he was a member of their 1983 reserves premiership–winning team.

He spent part of the 1984 season with Footscray, without playing a senior game, before ending the year at Camberwell.

Schultz was given life membership to Essendon in 2011.
