= Greg Bell (Australian footballer) =

Australian rules footballer

Personal information
- Full name: Gregory Bell
- Born: 26 March 1955 (age 71)
- Original team: Rupanyup (Wimmera FL)
- Height: 188 cm (6 ft 2 in)
- Weight: 87 kg (192 lb)
- Position: Defender

Playing career^{1}
Years	Club	Games (Goals)
1975–1978	Essendon	22 (1)
- ^{1} Playing statistics correct to the end of 1978.

Gregory Bell (born 26 March 1955) is a former Australian rules footballer who played with Essendon in the Victorian Football League (VFL).

== Career ==
Bell was a member of the Rupanyup team that won the Wimmera Football League premiership in 1973. The following year he polled 18 votes to win the Toohey Medal on countback, an award for the Wimmera Football League's best and fairest player.

=== Essendon ===
A defender, Bell started at Essendon in the 1975 VFL season. Although he only played the first half of the season, his efforts from nine games were enough for him to win Essendon's "best first year player" award. In round nine against North Melbourne at Waverley Park, Bell badly injured his knee during the first quarter. This ended his year and also caused him to miss the entire 1976 season.

He played 12 games for Essendon in the 1977 season, but was unable to perform at the same level he had before the injury.

In 1978 he was still troubled by injury and did not play until round 20, a game against Melbourne at Windy Hill. He kicked the only goal of his VFL career in that game, which was his final appearance for Essendon.

Bell left Essendon in 1980 for the Croydon Football Club.
