= George Caris =

Australian rules footballer

Personal information
- Full name: George Caris
- Born: 8 June 1927
- Died: 10 October 2013 (aged 86)
- Original team: Sunday Amateurs
- Height: 182 cm (6 ft 0 in)
- Weight: 81 kg (179 lb)

Playing career^{1}
Years	Club	Games (Goals)
1948–50	South Melbourne	19 (1)
1951–53	Port Melbourne	48 (-)
- ^{1} Playing statistics correct to the end of 1953.

Career highlights
- Port Melbourne premiership player: 1953

George Caris (8 June 1927 – 10 October 2013) was an Australian rules footballer who played with South Melbourne in the Victorian Football League (VFL).

== South Melbourne ==
Caris came to South Melbourne from Olympic, a club in the local Sunday Amateur competition. Used as a ruck-rover, Caris made 15 appearances for South Melbourne in the 1948 VFL season and earned a Brownlow Medal vote while playing on Norm Smith, but only managed to play three senior games in 1949.

He played his first game of the 1950 season in round four, against Fitzroy, during which he was reported for "kicking" opponent Jack Gaffney. Caris, who had kicked the only goal of his career in the third quarter, was suspended for eight weeks. It would end up being his final appearance at VFL level, in 1951 he left for Port Melbourne.

== VFA ==
Caris was a regular member of the Port Melbourne team in the 1951 VFA season, as a half back flanker, although an ankle injury sustained in the club's preliminary final win cost him a grand final appearance.

The following year he was a beneficiary of injury, when he took Denis Fogarty's spot in the starting side for the grand final against Oakleigh, which Port Melbourne lost by 21 points. He kicked two goals and was named amongst Port Melbourne's best players.

In 1953, Caris trained with the Richmond Football Club, but would return to Port Melbourne for a third and final VFA season. He finished his VFA career with a premiership, as a back pocket in Port Melbourne's grand final win over Yarraville.

== Murtoa ==
Caris was cleared to Wimmera Football League club Murtoa as coach in 1954. Coach of Murtoa for three seasons, Caris continued as a player until 1960. Following a year as coach of Jung, he returned to Murtoa for a season in 1962, then later in 1968 came out of retirement and played one final season.

He also played cricket for Murtoa and scored his maiden century at 51 years of age.
