= Wayne Beddison =

Australian rules footballer

Personal information
- Born: 24 August 1961 (age 65)
- Original team: Dimboola (WFL)
- Height: 188 cm (6 ft 2 in)
- Weight: 82 kg (181 lb)

Playing career^{1}
Years	Club	Games (Goals)
1983	Essendon	10 (18)
- ^{1} Playing statistics correct to the end of 1983.

Wayne Beddison (born 24 August 1961) is a former Australian rules footballer who played with Essendon in the Victorian Football League (VFL).

Beddison, a Dimboola recruit, where he won the Wimmera Football League's Under 17 best and fairest award in 1976 and 1977.

Beddison played 10 games for Essendon, all in the 1983 VFL season. He took one of the best marks of the 1983 season, on debut, at the Sydney Cricket Ground. A forward, his 18 goals that year included a six-goal haul in a win over the Sydney Swans at Windy Hill in round 12.

He didn't take part in Essendon's finals campaign, but was a member of their 1983 reserves premiership team, before returning to Dimboola after the grand final win.

== Links ==
- Wayne Beddison player profile via Essendon FC Past Players
