= Perc Bushby =

Australian rules footballer (1919–1975)

Percy Bushby

Personal information
- Born: 27 May 1919; Narrandera, New South Wales
- Died: 29 August 1975 (aged 56); Melbourne, Victoria
- Original team: Narrandera
- Height: 189 cm (6 ft 2 in)
- Weight: 90 kg (198 lb)

Playing career^{1}
Years	Club	Games (Goals)
1936; 1939–1948	Essendon	142 (46)
- ^{1} Playing statistics correct to the end of 1948.

Career highlights
- Essendon best and fairest 1944; Essendon premiership teams 1942, 1946; Captain-Coach of 5 Wimmera FL premierships: 1950, 1955-58.

Percy Bushby (27 May 1919 – 29 August 1975) was an Australian rules footballer who played in the Victorian Football League (VFL).

He played in the Essendon premiership teams in 1942 and 1946. He won the Essendon best and fairest award in 1944.

Bushby captain-coached Stawell to a premiership in 1950 and led Ararat to four flags from 1955 to 1958.
