= Tom Williamson (Australian footballer) =

Australian rules footballer

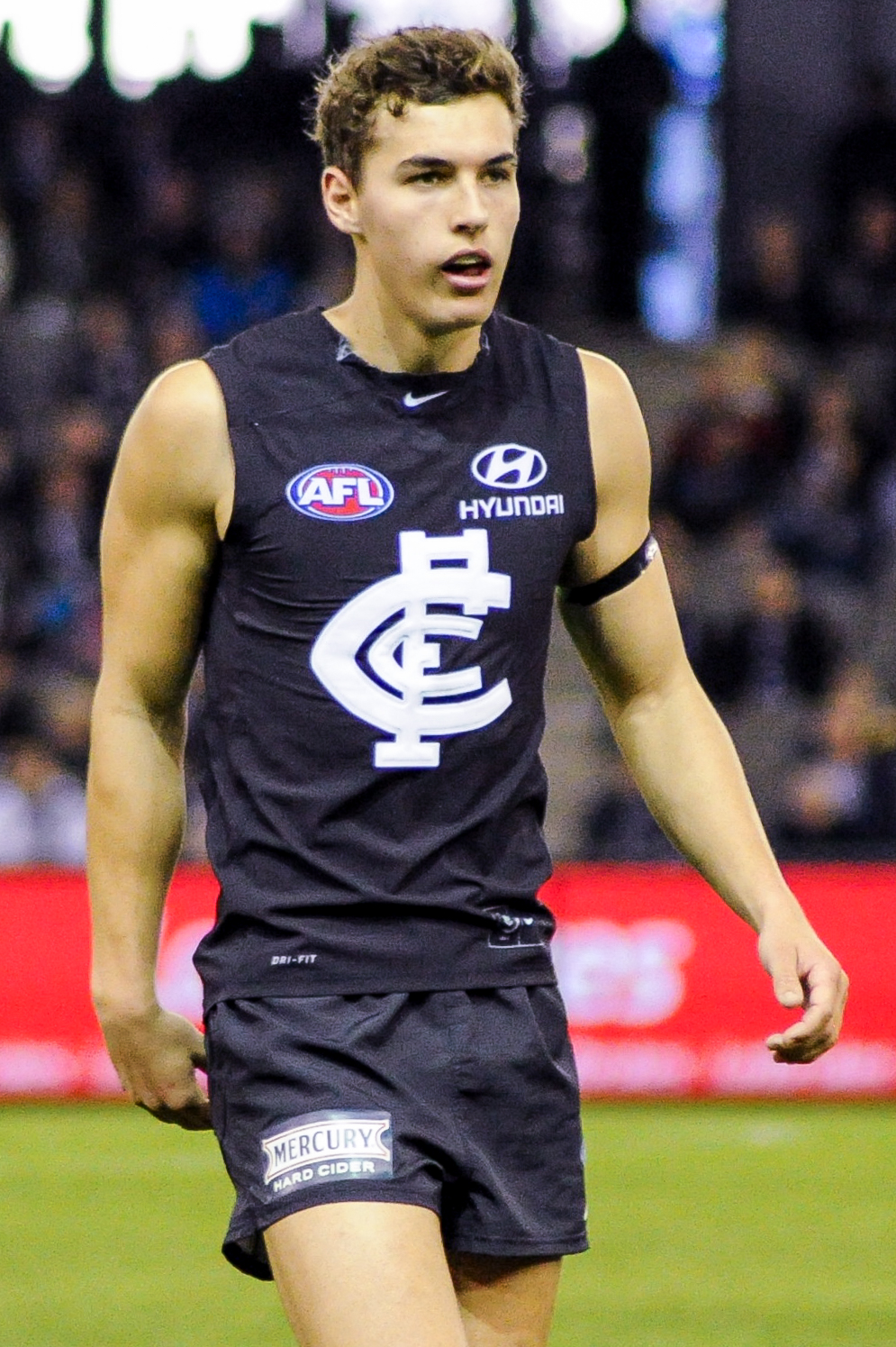
- Williamson playing for Carlton in June 2017

Personal information
- Born: 12 December 1998 (age 27)
- Original team: North Ballarat Rebels (TAC Cup)
- Draft: No. 61, 2016 national draft
- Debut: Round 3, 2017, Carlton vs. Essendon, at Melbourne Cricket Ground
- Height: 190 cm (6 ft 3 in)
- Weight: 85 kg (187 lb)
- Position: Defender

Playing career^{1}
Years	Club	Games (Goals)
2017–2022	Carlton	44 (4)
- ^{1} Playing statistics correct to the end of 2022.

Tom Williamson (born 12 December 1998) is a former professional Australian rules footballer who played for the Carlton Football Club in the Australian Football League (AFL).

Hailing from Ararat, Williamson played TAC Cup football with North Ballarat until 2016. At the draft combine that year he scored particularly well in fitness indicators including placing first in the agility test and finishing second in the 3 km time trial, and he was drafted to the AFL by Carlton with the club's fifth selection and the sixty-first overall in the 2016 national draft.

Williamson quickly made his AFL debut, in round 3 of the 2017 season in the fifteen point victory against Essendon at the Melbourne Cricket Ground. He recorded fifteen disposals and five tackles for the match. He managed 15 games in his debut season, and finished the season with stat averages of 12 disposals, 3 marks, 2 tackles and 1 spoil.

Williamson saw little football over the following two seasons, with back injuries limiting him to only two senior matches in 2018 and 2019. Nevertheless, he earned a two-year contract extension, signifying him as one of Carlton's long-term prospects. He made a return to regular senior football in 2020, playing 15 of Carlton's 17 games in the COVID-19 pandemic-shortened season, then played 11 of 22 games in 2021.

After playing only one game as an unused medical substitute in early 2022, Williamson took a leave of absence from the club in June due to undisclosed personal reasons, before retiring altogether one month later.

After his departure from Carlton, Williamson signed a deal to play with North Melbourne's reserves for the rest of the 2022 season.

In September 2023, Williamson pleaded guilty in the Melbourne Magistrates’ Court to a series of charges arising from the stalking and harassment of a woman between July and October 2022. The charges included stalking with the intention of causing the woman harm or fear. Court documents alleged that Williamson repeatedly contacted the woman through newly created social-media accounts after she had asked him to leave her alone and blocked his accounts, including making 13 phone calls and sending multiple text messages over a 10-day period. The presiding magistrate described the offending as “very serious” and told Williamson that he had lost his football career as a result of his conduct. He avoided conviction but was placed on a 12-month good behaviour bond and ordered to donate $2,000 to a court charity fund.
