= Les Fairbairn =

Australian rules footballer

Personal information
- Full name: Thomas Carlyle Leslie Fairbairn
- Born: 25 April 1889; Sale, Victoria
- Died: 20 April 1964 (aged 74); Mitcham, Victoria
- Original team: Geelong Grammar
- Height: 177 cm (5 ft 10 in)
- Weight: 72 kg (159 lb)
- Position: Ruck / Utility

Playing career^{1}
Years	Club	Games (Goals)
1906, 1910–14	Geelong	68 (20)
- ^{1} Playing statistics correct to the end of 1914.

Thomas Carlyle Leslie Fairbairn (25 April 1889 – 20 April 1964) was an Australian rules footballer who played with Geelong in the Victorian Football League (VFL).
