= Russell Crow (footballer) =

Australian rules footballer

Personal information
- Full name: Russell Crow
- Born: 17 September 1941 (age 85)
- Original team: Warracknabeal
- Height: 191 cm (6 ft 3 in)
- Weight: 105 kg (231 lb)
- Position: Ruckman

Playing career^{1}
Years	Club	Games (Goals)
–1959	Warracknabeal	
1960	Fitzroy	2 (0)
1960	Warracknabeal	
1961–1964	Fitzroy	59 (52)
1965–1967	Warracknabeal	
1968–1973	Fitzroy	97 (63)
- ^{1} Playing statistics correct to the end of 1973.

Career highlights
- 1966 Wimmera FL Premiership captain-coach; 1967 Wimmera FL best & fairest: Toohey Medal; 1970 - Fitzroy FC best & fairest: 2nd; 1971 Victorian Representative team

Russell Crow (born 17 September 1941) is a former Australian rules footballer for Fitzroy in the Victorian Football League (VFL).

== Playing career ==
Crow made his debut for Fitzroy in round 1 of the 1960 VFL season, playing as a ruckman and played in round two before returning to his Wimmera Football League club Warracknabeal.

He played 158 VFL matches for Fitzroy between 1960 and 1973 in three separate stints.

In 1971 Crow made his representative debut for Victoria when he played in the interstate match versus South Australia on 12 June 1971. He was chosen in the squad to represent Victoria at the 1972 Perth Carnival, but had to withdraw due to injury.
