= Arthur Hart (footballer, born 1905) =

Australian rules footballer (1905–1989)

Personal information
- Full name: Arthur Howie Hart
- Born: 10 June 1905; Beulah, Victoria
- Died: 12 May 1989 (aged 83); Mill Park, Victoria
- Original teams: Stawell, Brunswick (VFA)
- Height: 185 cm (6 ft 1 in)
- Weight: 85 kg (187 lb)

Playing career^{1}
Years	Club	Games (Goals)
1922–1923	Stawell	? (?)
1924–1927	Brunswick	44 (28)
1928–1929	St Kilda	34 (29)
1930–1937	Stawell	? (?)
- ^{1} Playing statistics correct to the end of 1922.

Career highlights
- Stawell FC Premiership Captain-Coach: 1930, 1931, 1933.; Stawell FC: Life Memberhip: 1933

Arthur Howie Hart (10 June 1905 – 12 May 1989) was an Australian rules footballer who played for the Brunswick Football Club in the Victorian Football Association (VFA), and the St Kilda Football Club in the Victorian Football League (VFL).

== Football ==
Arthur "Steve" Hart played senior football with Stawell in 1922, under captain-coach, Bill Twomey and then played in Stawell's 1923 Wimmera Football League grand final side that lost to Warracknabeal.

Hart then played with Brunswick from 1924 to 1927.

Hart then spent two seasons with St. Kilda in 1928 and 1929.

Hart was appointed as captain-coach of his former home town, the Stawell Football Club in 1930, when he gained a teaching position at the Stawell High School.

Hart was captain-coach of Stawell when they won three Wimmera Football League premierships in 1930, 1931 and 1933.

Hart coached Stawell for eight successive years from 1930 to 1937, including their grand final loss to Dimboola in 1937.

In 1938, Hart's teaching career saw him move to Daylesford, where he joined the committee of the Daylesford Football Club.

== Family ==
The son of Adam Hart (1859–1941), and Ellen Matilda "Nellie" Hart (1876–1933), née Collins, Arthur Howie Hart was born at Beulah, Victoria on 10 June 1905.

He married Minna Elizabeth Wilson (1907–2000) on 22 May 1931.

== Military service ==
A school teacher at Mildura High School, he enlisted in the Australian Volunteer Defence Corps in March 1942.

== Death ==
He died at Mill Park, Victoria on 12 May 1989.
