= Cyril Suares =

Australian rules footballer

Personal information
- Full name: Cyril Victor Suares
- Born: 2 June 1888; West Melbourne, Victoria
- Died: 18 April 1966 (aged 77); Bairnsdale, Victoria
- Original team: Minyip
- Height: 170 cm (5 ft 7 in)
- Weight: 68 kg (150 lb)

Playing career^{1}
Years	Club	Games (Goals)
1913	Collingwood	4 (0)
- ^{1} Playing statistics correct to the end of 1913.

Cyril Victor Suares (2 June 1888 – 18 April 1966) was a former Australian rules footballer who played with Collingwood in the Victorian Football League (VFL).
