= Peter Light =

Australian rules footballer

Personal information
- Full name: Peter Light
- Born: 19 July 1960 (age 66)
- Original team: Dimboola
- Height: 180 cm (5 ft 11 in)
- Weight: 80 kg (176 lb)

Playing career^{1}
Years	Club	Games (Goals)
1980	Essendon	2 (0)
- ^{1} Playing statistics correct to the end of 1980.

Peter Light (born 19 July 1960) is a former Australian rules footballer who played with Essendon in the Victorian Football League (VFL).

Light was captain-coach of Horsham's 1983 premiership and also won the 1983 and 1984 Wimmera Football League best and fairest award, the Toohey Medal, representing Horsham.
