= Ken Hedt =

Australian rules footballer

Personal information
- Born: 15 November 1936
- Died: 16 May 2006 (aged 69)
- Original team: Jeparit
- Debut: Round 2, 1956, Collingwood vs. South Melbourne, at Victoria Park
- Height: 173 cm (5 ft 8 in)
- Weight: 71 kg (157 lb)

Playing career^{1}
Years	Club	Games (Goals)
1956	Collingwood	20 (6)
- ^{1} Playing statistics correct to the end of 1956.

Ken Hedt (15 November 1936 – 16 May 2006) was an Australian rules footballer, who played in the Victorian Football League for Collingwood.

Ken Hedt played a full season in 1956 the year he made his league career only. He, as a winger, had to be taken off injured in the second quarter of the losing 1956 Grand Final against Melbourne.

He has four children and two grandchildren.
