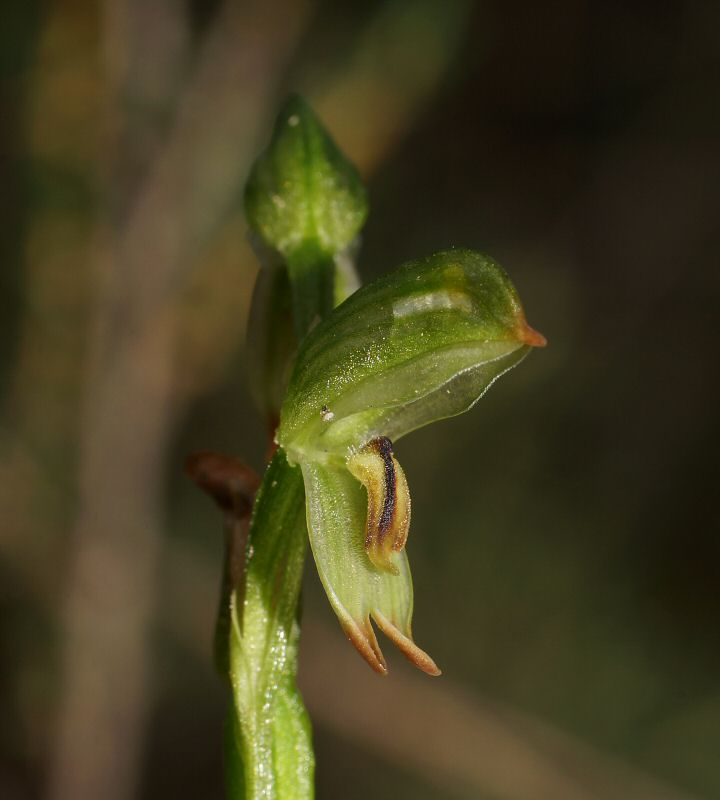
- In the northern Grampians

Scientific classification
- Kingdom: Plantae
- Clade: Embryophytes
- Clade: Tracheophytes
- Clade: Spermatophytes
- Clade: Angiosperms
- Clade: Monocots
- Order: Asparagales
- Family: Orchidaceae
- Subfamily: Orchidoideae
- Tribe: Cranichideae
- Genus: Pterostylis
- Species: P. diminuta

Binomial name
- Pterostylis diminuta (D.L.Jones) G.N.Backh.

Synonyms
- Bunochilus diminutus D.L.Jones

= Pterostylis diminuta =

Small-flowered leafy greenhood

Species of orchid

Pterostylis diminuta, commonly known as small-flowered leafy greenhood, is a plant in the orchid family Orchidaceae and is endemic to Victoria. As with similar greenhoods, the flowering plants differ from those that are not flowering. The non-flowering plants have a rosette of leaves flat on the ground but the flowering plants have up to twelve small, partly green, partly translucent flowers and lack a rosette.

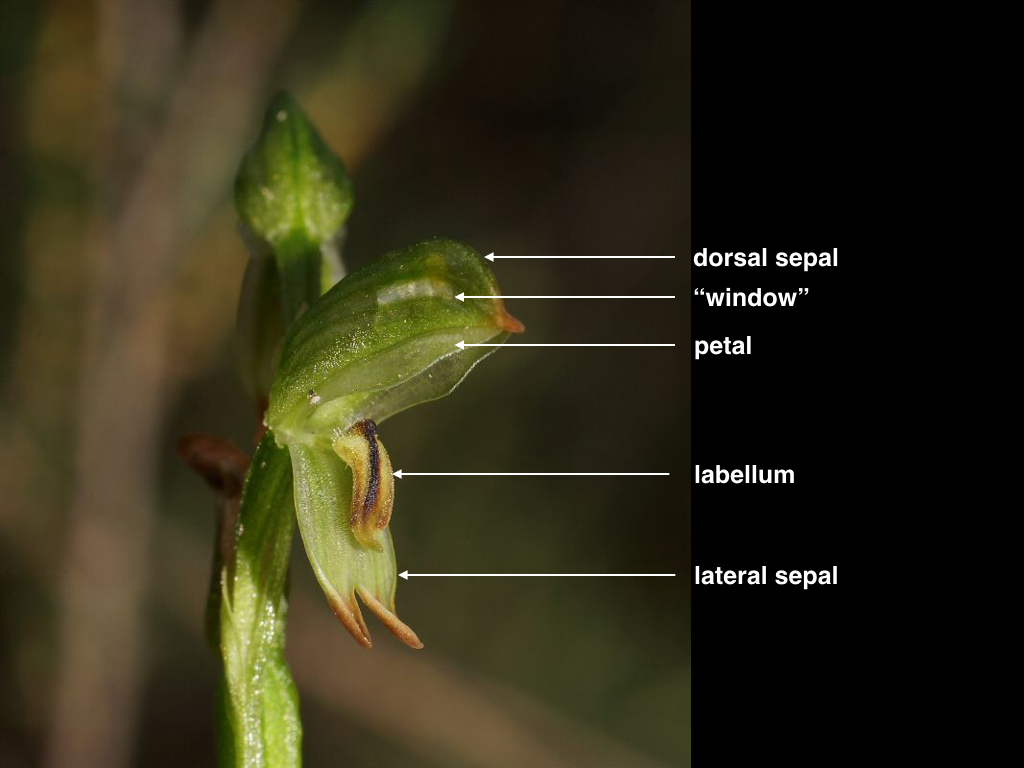
Labelled image

== Description ==
Pterostylis diminuta, is a terrestrial, perennial, deciduous, herb with an underground tuber. Non-flowering plants have a rosette of between three and six, egg-shaped leaves, each leaf 15–25 mm (0.6–1 in) long and 3–5 mm (0.1–0.2 in) wide. Flowering plants lack a rosette but have up to twelve flowers on a flowering spike 80–400 mm (3–20 in) high with four to seven linear to lance-shaped stem leaves that are 15–80 mm (0.6–3 in) long and 2–4 mm (0.08–0.2 in) wide. The flowers are 10–15 mm (0.4–0.6 in) long, 4–6 mm (0.16–0.24 in) wide. The dorsal sepal and petals are joined to form a hood called the "galea" over the column. The galea is dark green with translucent "windows" and a brownish, tapered tip. The lateral sepals turn downwards and are 8–11 mm (0.3–0.4 in) long, 4–6 mm (0.16–0.24 in) wide and joined for about half their length. The labellum is 4–5 mm (0.16–0.20 in) long, about 2 mm (0.08 in) wide and brownish with a dark stripe along its mid-line. Flowering occurs from September to November.

== Taxonomy and naming ==
The small-flowered leafy greenhood was first formally described in 2006 by David Jones and Mark Clements and given the name Bunochilus diminutus. The description was published in Australian Orchid Research from a specimen collected in the Deep Lead Reserve near Stawell. In 2007, Gary Backhouse changed the name to Pterostylis diminuta. The specific epithet (diminuta) is from "the Latin diminutus, diminished, made small, in reference to the smaller flowers and floral parts of this species when compared with B. melagrammus" (Pterostylis melagramma).

== Distribution and habitat ==
Pterostylis diminuta occurs in grassy or shrubby woodland and forest between Ballarat and the Grampians in Victoria.
