= Stawell Gold Mine =

Gold mine in Stawell, Victoria, Australia

- Location within Australia
- Location: Stawell, Victoria, Australia; 37.07°S 142.81°E
- Products: Gold
- Opened: 1981
- Company: Stawell Gold Mines (VSG)

The Stawell Gold Mine (SGM) is a gold mine located just outside the town of Stawell, Victoria. The current site was established in 1981, however mining has occurred on and around the site since the town was established in the mid 19th century.

The Magdala mine complex, consisting of various extensive declines that formerly reached operating depths of up to 1.6 Kilometers (0.99 Miles). In the present day, mining operations reach depths of just over 1 km, down the Golden Gift decline. In recent years, the Magdala has been extended over to the former Wonga Gold Mine via an underground connection.

== History ==
Stawell Gold Mine is based in the Western Goldfields region of Victoria. The local area has been the site of gold mining since its founding in 1853. The modern mine's primary decline, the Magdala decline, was started in 1981, as an exploratory project by a joint venture between Western Mining Company and Central Norseman Gold, commenced in 1978, spearheaded by a spike in gold prices in the mid 1970s. The mine was the first of its kind upon the Stawell deposit, featuring substantially newer technologies than former ventures in the area.

In 1984, The Magdala mine transitioned from exploration to production, with the first gold pour occurring on the 14th of August of that year.

In May 1987, Mining at the former Davis Pit, around half way along Reefs Road recommenced, with the first ore processed the following month, although this project was short lived, with backfilling commencing in stages over the following years.

By 1992, The mine had produced 336,000oz of gold, when it was acquired by Mining Project Investors Pty Ltd. (MPI) and Pittson, in a joint venture as Stawell Gold Mines (SGM).

In 1998, the concept of an open cut project at Big Hill was proposed. Over Following years, the topic was hotly debated in the Stawell community, and was not concluded until the next decade, with the State Government and Northern Grampians Shire Council concluding that it would not go ahead any time in the near future. Around this time, Stawell Gold Mines encountered the challenging reality of the regions South Fault, of which displaces any potential continuation of the central Magdala lode by a substantial distance. Along with a team from Melbourne University, it was discovered the following year that material had been displaced roughly 600m to the North. In 2004, following promising results from over 2000m of drilling, development from the 900 level began with two fault-separated declines, a continuation of the Magdala, along with a new decline, The Golden Gift.

In July 1999, The new primary return airway system, which surfaces at the intersection of McLellan and Mathers streets, became operational, following a major ground failure in a prior attempt 2 years prior. This system remains a vital asset today, creating a circuit that draws hot air from the bottom of the mine to the surface.

In December 2004, MPI, having obtained whole ownership at a point prior, Spun their Stawell Gold assets off into the Australian Securities Exchange listed Leviathan Resources. The mine was purchased by Perseverance Corporation. Two years later, SGM was once again sold, this time to Northgate Minerals, which itself was subsequently acquired by AuRico, who sold both Stawell and Fosterville Gold Mine the next year.

In 2005, Stawell Gold Mine became the first mine in the world to utilise DAS/MINEGEM, a Remote Loader operation system which created a near-zero operator risk when bogging stopes, as it allows the operator to control the machine from a sealed control station in a separate drive.

In 2006, SGM employees Jeremy Rowlings, Brett Chalmers and Scott Franklin were heavily involved in the recovery efforts following the Beaconsfield Mine collapse. The subsequently received bravery awards from the Herald Sun.

Crocodile Gold obtained the mine in 2012. At a stage under ownership of Croc Gold, the Big Hill open cut project was once again proposed, however did not eventuate.

In 2013, following a decline in grade in the lower extremes of the Golden Gift and Magdala Declines, along with its costly operating conditions, began to make the future of developing the Golden Gift seem uncertain. This was only worsened by the discovery that continuation of the lode was displaced to a depth of roughly 2,300m below surface, leading to the Golden Gift and neighbouring Magdala's closures, with the mine favouring lower grade ore at shallower depths. At the time of their closure, the declines depths reached 1,646m RL (GG) and 1,227m RL (MA).

The mine transitioned into the hands of Newmarket Gold Inc. in July 2015, after Crocodile Gold Corp. and its assets were absorbed into the company.

In 2016, under the ownership of Newmarket Gold's successor, Kirkland Lake Gold, exploration drilling began on the Magdala East (East Flank) area, known as the Aurora B. Results in this area would prove somewhat promising, however could not prevent the mines imminent closure, which came in December of that year, laying off around 150 staff, leaving the mine to operate under care and maintenance conditions.

In 2017, Arete Capital partners obtained a controlling share in the company, going on to examine the path the mine would take in the future to maximise production, with restoring and servicing all the mines production assets, the mine would go on to reopen fully, with the first production firing occurring in December 2018, and the first gold pour since the closure occurring in February of the following year.

In 2019, construction on the Stawell Underground Physics Laboratory (SUPL), commenced 1 km below surface level inside the mine, the facility opened in August 2022.

Since reopening, the mine has pursued Gold in new areas such as the aforementioned Aurora B, which intersects a lower section of the older Federal Albion, along with the New Hampshire and Vincent resource areas and finally rehabilitation and further development of the older G1 area of the Golden Gift.

In late 2025, The Victor Smorgon Group acquired whole ownership of the mine.

== Exploration ==
Initial Diamond Drilling on the mine and its owned tenements was conducted by Western Deep Hole, a Western Australian company.

In 2005, Deepcore Drilling was founded by Scott tumbridge, an employee of Major Drilling, the then-current Diamond Drill Contractor. Deepcore Subsequently took over the SGM contract from Major. Deepcore has since become one of Australia's largest Diamond Drill contractors, and have conducted works on mine sites across Australia, and collaborated on projects such as Melbourne's Metro Tunnel

== Infrastructure and Facilities ==
Stawell Gold Mines has numerous surface facilities including office spaces, light and heavy vehicle parking, 24-hour electrical and mechanical maintenance facilities, Vehicle fuel and wash bays. Ore is processed at the mines onsite mill, with ore supplied by truck loads transferred to the ROM pad.

The mine itself consists of over 350 km of shafts and features an elaborate return airway system, keeping a constant fresh air draft in active drives and declines, and keeping hotter, contaminated air in auxiliary drives.

Underground ammenities include specially designed portable toilets in various locations, 3 underground crib rooms and in the case of an emergency, refuge chambers, providing personnel with a safe muster location which utilises two forms of both oxygen supply and communication with surface (Radio & Landline) are spread generously throughout the mines different developments and haul routes.

The mines internal depth is measured at a Reduced level of 300m above Mean sea level (MSL).

=== Equipment ===
Since 2014, SGM has had a close relationship with Swedish mining equipment manufacturer Epiroc (formerly Atlas Copco Mining). The mine uses their M2C and M20 Boomer Jumbo Drills, MT65 Minetrucks, Simba Production Drills and ST18 Underground Loaders. The Mine also operates Caterpillar Loaders and Volvo wheel loader based Charge equipment.

The on-site light vehicle fleet consists of the Toyota Hilux and 79-Series Landcruiser, along with the newly introduced Kovatera KT200, a light vehicle built entirely for underground mining.

== Wonga ==
Wonga Gołd Mine
- Location: Stawell, Victoria, Australia
- Products: Gold
- Opened: 1984 (open pit); 1986 (Underground; 2024 (Underground only via Magdala decline)
- Closed: c. 2003 (UG work resumed 2024)
- Company: Stawell Gold Mines

First breaking ground in 1984, initially as an open cut project on a site across adjacent to the primary site, Wonga was aimed at capitalising off Stawell's generous gold reefs. In 1986 a portal was installed and an underground decline started. The Wonga open cut mining site wound down in 1986, and underground operation ceased around 2003. In recent years, its open pit and portal access slated for land rehabilitation. Underground pressurised air and water services, along with various other infrastructure are still installed at and operated via the former Wonga facility.

Since 2023, a decline has been developed off the main Magdala decline under the Wonga name, operating in close proximity to the former Wonga underground workings.

Wonga was formerly home to one of the first two commercially-available battery electric Epiroc ST-18 SG underground loaders. However, the loader has since moved to the Golden Gift area, utilising its lower operating temperature to minimise heat related risks in the naturally hotter environment deeper in the mine.
