= Stawell Underground Physics Laboratory =

Particle physics laboratory in Victoria, Australia

- Established: 2022
- Research type: Research laboratory
- Field of research: Physics, dark matter
- Location: Stawell, Victoria, Australia; 37.07°S 142.81°E
- Affiliations: University of Melbourne the Centre of Excellence for Particle Physics the Australian Nuclear Science and Technology Organisation; University of Adelaide; Italian National Institute of Nuclear and Particle Physics.
- Website: https://www.supl.org.au/

The Stawell Underground Physics Laboratory (SUPL) is a laboratory 1 km deep in the Stawell Gold Mine, located in Stawell, Shire of Northern Grampians, Victoria, Australia. Together with the planned Agua Negra Deep Experiment Site (ANDES) at the Agua Negra Pass, it is one of just two underground particle physics laboratories in the Southern Hemisphere and shall conduct research into dark matter.

The project is a collaboration between six international partners. It will be led by the University of Melbourne with the Swinburne University of Technology, the University of Adelaide, the Australian National University, the Australian Nuclear Science and Technology Organisation (ANSTO) and the Italian National Institute for Nuclear Physics.

It is expected that the project will collaborate closely with the Gran Sasso Laboratory in Italy.

Construction commenced in 2019, and though it was expected to be complete by the end of 2021 due to delays from corporate mergers it opened in August 2022.

== General information ==
The project's Southern Hemisphere location has bearing on the possible differential detection of the putative WIMP-wind. Northern Hemisphere instruments are showing hints of a June "bump" of possible dark matter hits, which is expected given the galaxy's rotation, but it is hard to be sure that it is not a false signal due to some subtle seasonal environmental effect. A Southern Hemisphere location, on the opposite side of the Earth with its converse seasons, could help to provide valuable confirmation one way or another.

Secondly, the sundry particles (apparently from the constellation Cygnus) would have travelled through the Earth itself before reaching SUPL's instruments.

Finally, its Southern Hemisphere location also makes it potentially very sensitive to daily variation effects which would be a smoking-gun for self-interacting dark matter or dark matter with a significant stopping rate.

Inasmuch as neutrino experiments do not benefit in the same way from a Southern Hemisphere location, and IceCube is already extant, it is unlikely that any neutrino detectors will be housed at SUPL.

== Funding ==
The first phase of the project received $1.75 million funding in the 2015 Australian federal budget. With matching funding from Victoria, construction started 2016 and was expected to be complete in 2017. However, a series of corporate mergers in 2015 and 2016 disrupted plans. The project was stalled when the new owners dismissed most of the labour force and shut down the Stawell gold mine to a "care and maintenance" state in December 2016. In December 2017, yet another new owner announced their intention to reopen the mine and were supportive of the underground laboratory, allowing hope that construction would restart.

In 2019, the project resumed. The 2019 Australian federal budget included $5 million for SUPL, and in July 2019 a memorandum of understanding between Stawell Gold Mines Pty Ltd, the Shire of Northern Grampians, and the University of Melbourne was signed to build and operate the laboratory.

== Construction ==
SUPL is planned to be located at a depth of 1,025 metres (3,363 ft), providing approximately 2900 metre water equivalent shielding against background cosmic rays. As a decline (ramp) mine, cars and trucks can be driven to the laboratory site. The laboratory will consist of a bespoke cavity of approximately 10 metres high and 10 metres wide (33×33 ft) excavated into the rock from an existing part of the mine.

The laboratory will be divided into 25 metres (80 ft) of clean room space for experiments, and 15 metres (50 ft) of "dirty" loading area. A side tunnel 5 m wide and 20 m long (15×65 ft) will house physical plant and personnel facilities.

== SABRE ==
The first experiment planned for SUPL is SABRE (Sodium-iodide with Active Background REjection), based on 50 kg of thallium-doped sodium iodide. Two detectors will be built: one at LNGS and one at SUPL. Improving on the DAMA/LIBRA experiment, the SUPL detector implements additional features for background rejection: a 12 kL liquid scintillator veto, and a muon veto (experiment member, M. Mews, remains the expert on said muon veto). Consistent results between the two would be very strong evidence.

As of August 2022, the SABRE experiment was expected to be constructed underground in SUPL during the last months of 2022, with data collection beginning in 2023.

In October 2023, the first piece of equipment, the muon veto, was installed. In January 2024, the main muon system was installed. In April 2024, the SABRE collaboration published an executive summary providing in-depth details of the detector's design.
