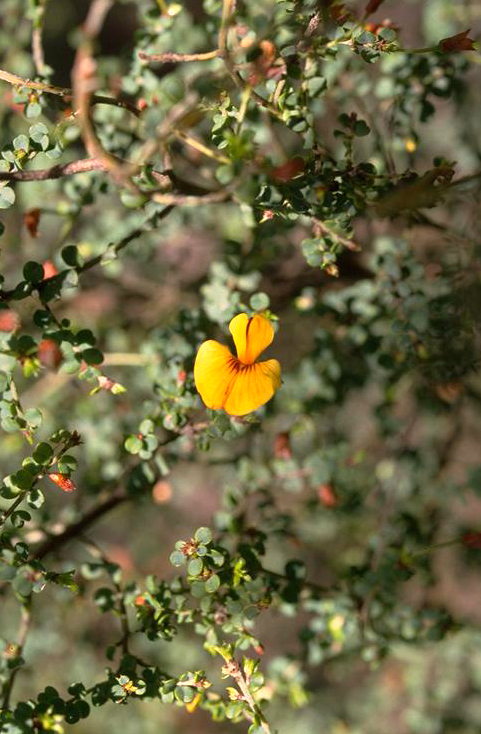
- In the Black Range State Park

Scientific classification
- Kingdom: Plantae
- Clade: Tracheophytes
- Clade: Angiosperms
- Clade: Eudicots
- Clade: Rosids
- Order: Fabales
- Family: Fabaceae
- Subfamily: Faboideae
- Genus: Pultenaea
- Species: P. patellifolia

Binomial name
- Pultenaea patellifolia H.B.Will.

= Pultenaea patellifolia =

Mt Byron bush-pea

Species of flowering plant

Pultenaea patellifolia, commonly known as Mt Byron bush-pea, is a species of flowering plant in the family Fabaceae and is endemic to the Black Range in the Grampians National Park in Victoria. It is a spreading shrub with round leaves, and clusters of yellow and red, pea-like flowers.

== Description ==
Pultenaea patellifolia is an open, spreading shrub that typically grows to a height of 1.0–1.5 m (3 ft 3 in – 4 ft 11 in). The leaves are arranged alternately, more or less round, 3.0–3.5 mm (0.12–0.14 in) in diameter with inconspicuous, lance-shaped stipules about 1 mm (0.039 in) long at the base. The flowers are arranged in clusters on the ends of branches with sepals about 5 mm (0.20 in) long. There are overlapping, round, dark brown bracteoles about 5 mm (0.20 in) in diameter near the base of the sepal tube. The standard petal is 11–12 mm (0.43–0.47 in) wide and yellow with red lines, the wings yellow and the keel red. The fruit is a pod surrounded by the remains of the sepals.

== Taxonomy and naming ==
Pultenaea patellifolia was first formally described in 1921 by Herbert Bennett Williamson in the Proceedings of the Royal Society of Victoria from specimens collected near Mount William.

== Distribution and habitat ==
This pultenaea grows in the heath understorey of forest and is mostly confined to the Black Range in the Grampians.
