= Grampians Rail Trail =

Rail trail in Victoria, Australia

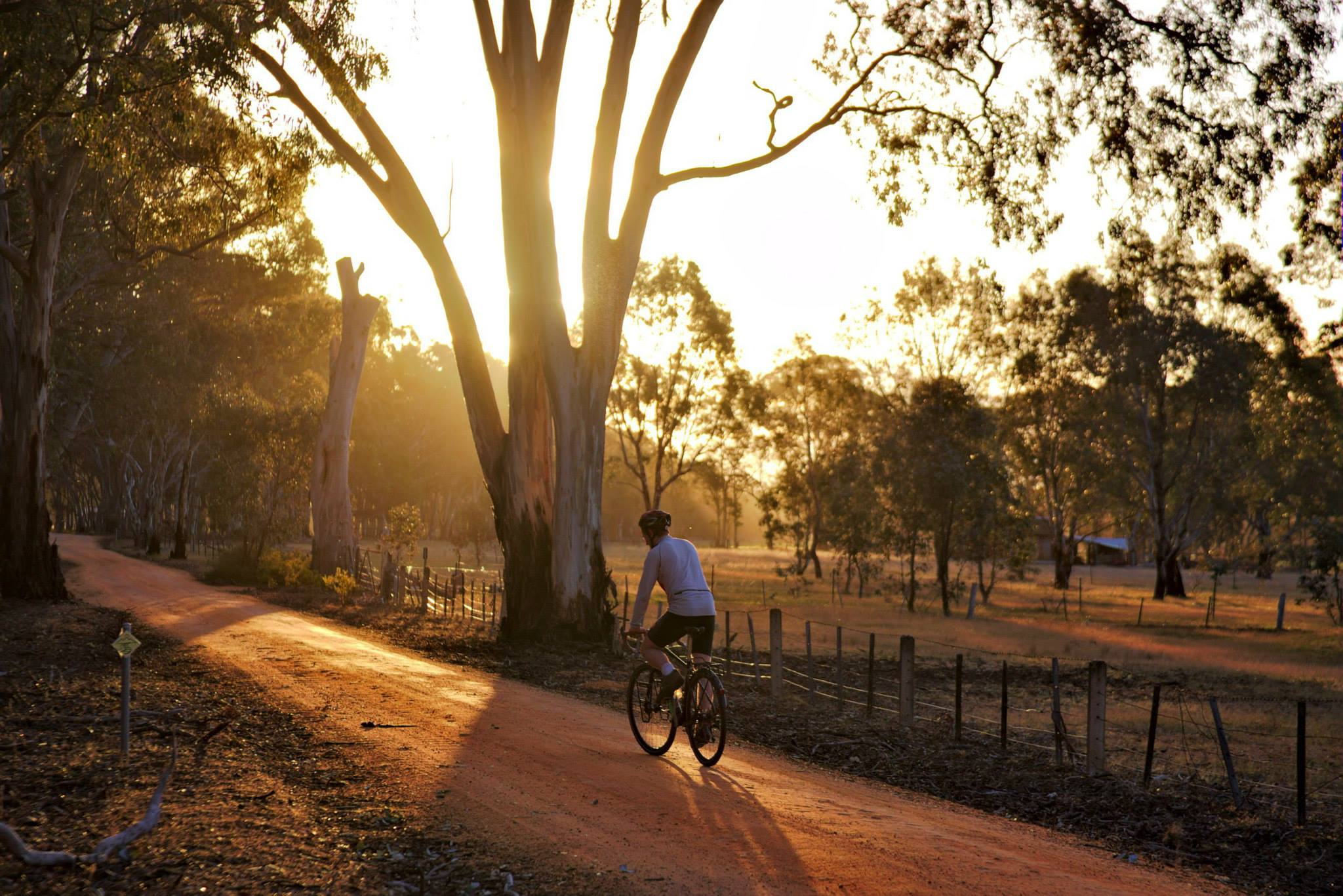
The Rail Trail, at Codds Flat Road, a short distance from Stawell, 2014.

The Grampians Rail Trail is a walking and cycling rail trail in Victoria, Australia.

The trail runs from Heatherlie Quarry, in the Grampians, to Stawell, in Victoria's west. As of November 2014, about 11 kilometres of trail is open. A very short section of trail is also open at the Heatherlie Quarry end. There are no plans to connect the two.

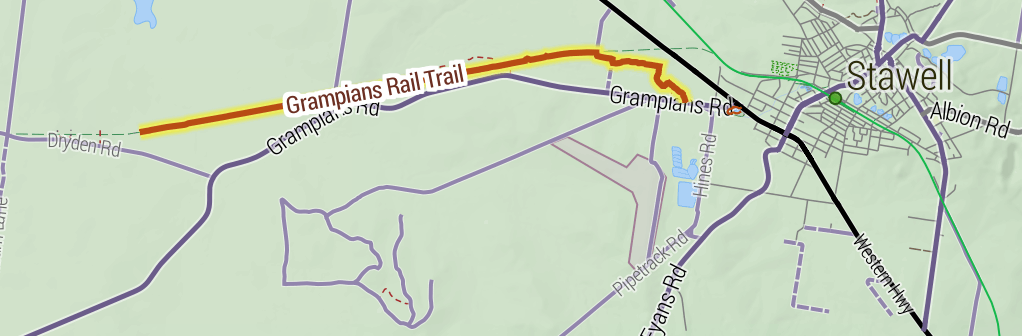
Map of the rail trail.
