= Bunjil's Shelter =

Protected area in Victoria, Australia

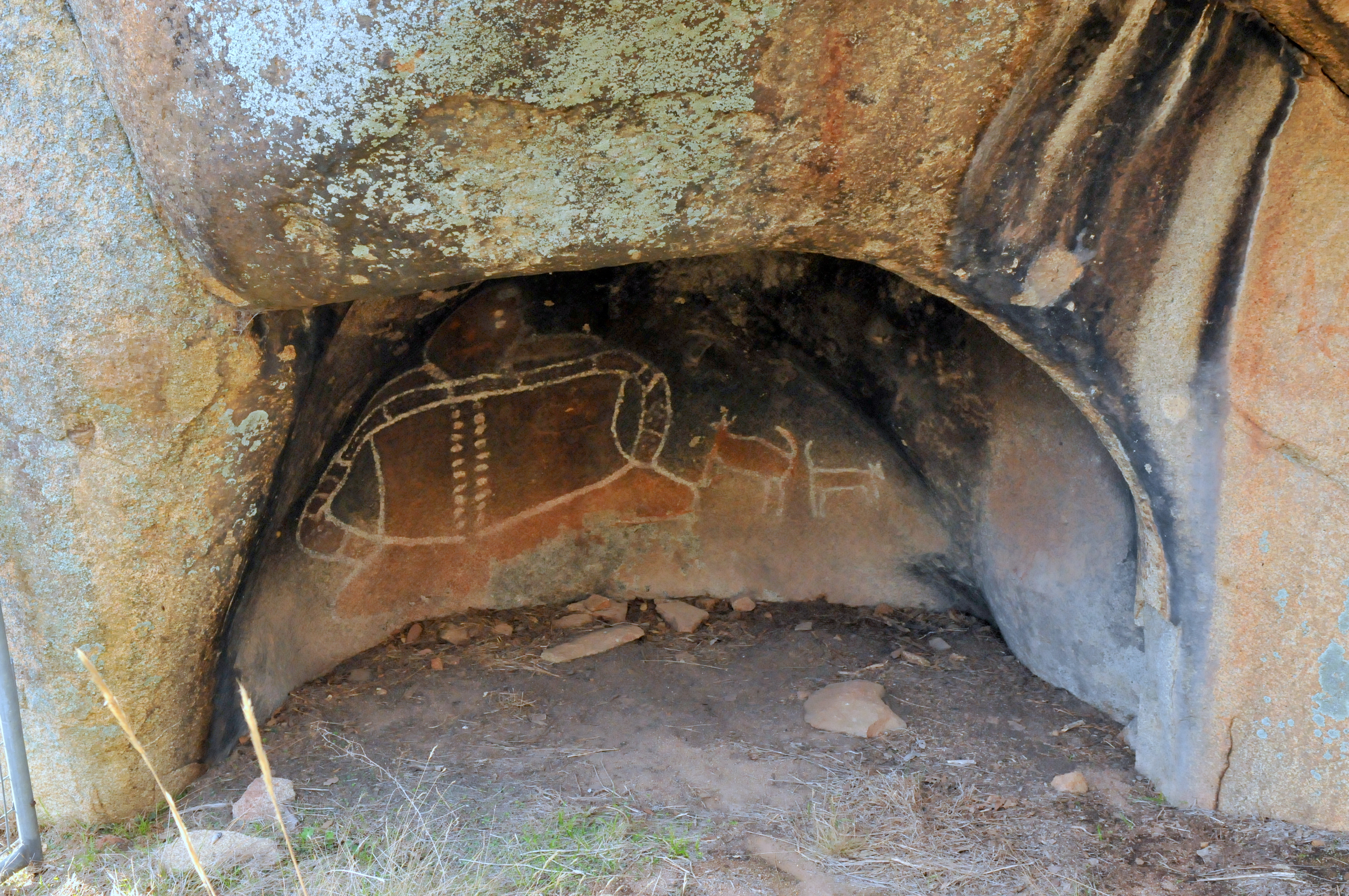

- Location within Victoria
- Location: Victoria
- Coordinates: 37°8′21.88″S 142°43′59.95″E

Bunjil's Shelter, also known as Bunjil's Cave, is an Aboriginal sacred site in the Grampians region of Australia near Stawell. It contains a painting of Bunjil and two dingos or dogs.

It is the only known rock art site to represent Bunjil, the creator-being in many Koori cultures.

It is one of the most significant Aboriginal cultural sites in south-eastern Australia.

The shelter lies within the Black Range Scenic Reserve (not to be confused with the Black Range State Park), about 10 kilometres (6.2 mi) south of Stawell. It is a small shelter at the base of a large granite boulder. It has been known to European locals since 1911 and the general public since 1957. It has long been fenced off due to repeated vandalism.

== Authenticity and origin ==
The paintings at the shelter have been proven to be of authentic Aboriginal origin. However, since the site was first reported publicly, its origin and authenticity has been questioned.

The common views are that the paintings are of Aboriginal origin, that the paintings have been "touched up" by Europeans, or that the paintings were entirely created by Europeans. As research and methodology advanced, the interpretation of the site's origin has changed several times. In 1979, due to faulty analysis of the pigments the site was removed from the VAS site register as it was interpreted to be of European origin. However, this decision was reversed in 1983 when scanning electron microscope (SEM) analysis was used to authenticate the site's Aboriginal origin. The SEM analysis showed that the site had been painted with authentic ochres, and had been "touched up" with European paints.

While Aboriginal paintings can usually be authenticated by comparison with known authentic techniques and styles, this is harder with Bunjil's Shelter as it is unique and isolated.

== In popular culture ==
The shelter is represented Victorian rock art in a series of eight postage stamps entitled "The First Australians".

A replica of the art of the site is on display in Stawell.
