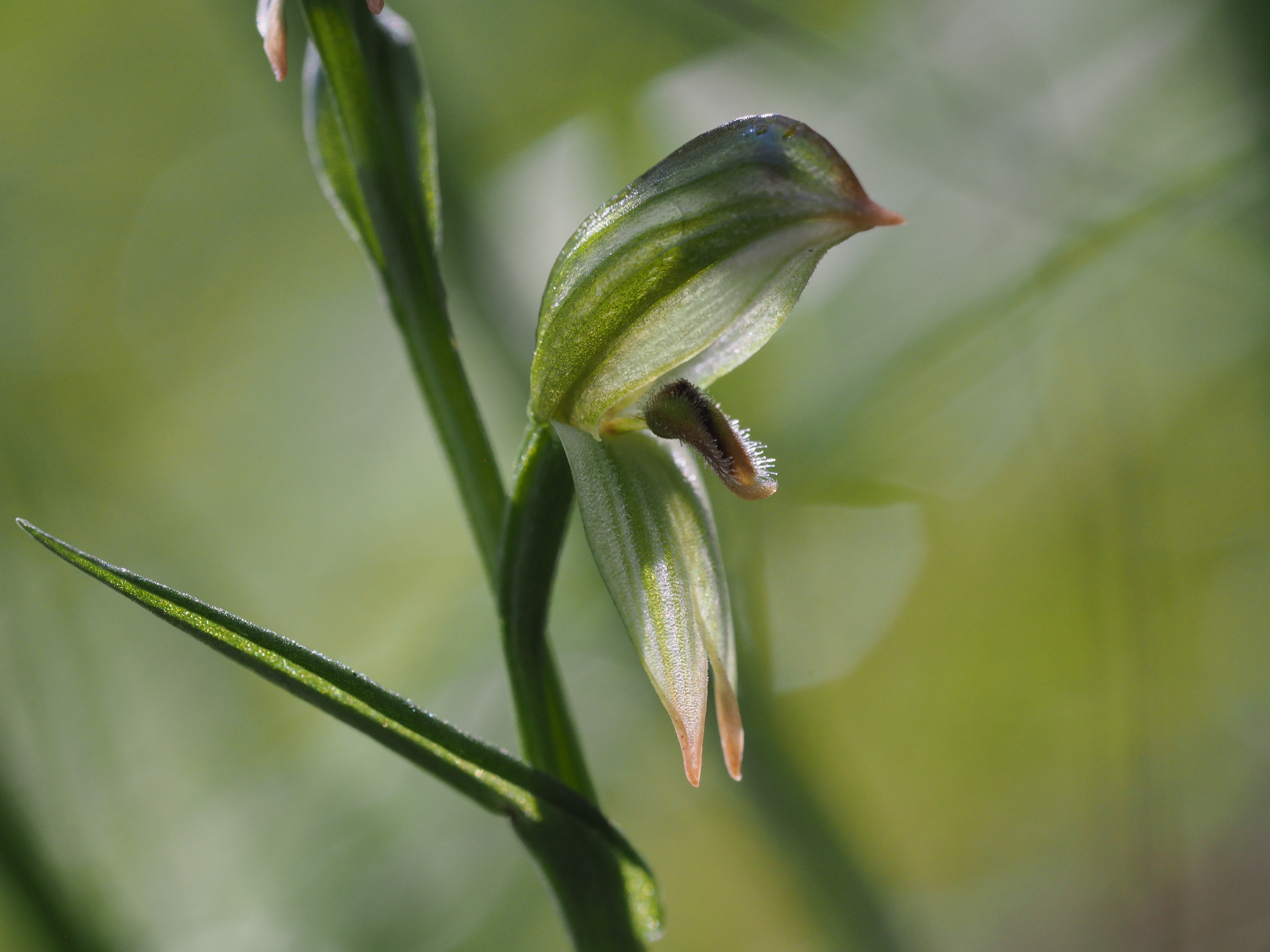
- Near Ebor

Scientific classification
- Kingdom: Plantae
- Clade: Tracheophytes
- Clade: Angiosperms
- Clade: Monocots
- Order: Asparagales
- Family: Orchidaceae
- Subfamily: Orchidoideae
- Tribe: Cranichideae
- Genus: Pterostylis
- Species: P. longifolia

Binomial name
- Pterostylis longifolia R.Br.

Synonyms
- Oligochaetochilus longifolius (R.Br.) Szlach.; Bunochilus longifolius (R.Br.) D.L.Jones & M.A.Clem.

= Pterostylis longifolia =

Tall greenhood

Species of orchid

Pterostylis longifolia, commonly known as the common leafy greenhood or tall greenhood, is a plant in the orchid family Orchidaceae and is endemic to eastern Australia. Flowering plants have up to seven flowers which are green, partly transparent and which have a labellum which is pale green and hairy with a blackish central stripe. Non-flowering plants have a rosette of leaves but flowering plants lack the rosette, instead having five to eight stem leaves. A similar species, Pterostylis melagramma has paler green flowers which have a less hairy labellum.

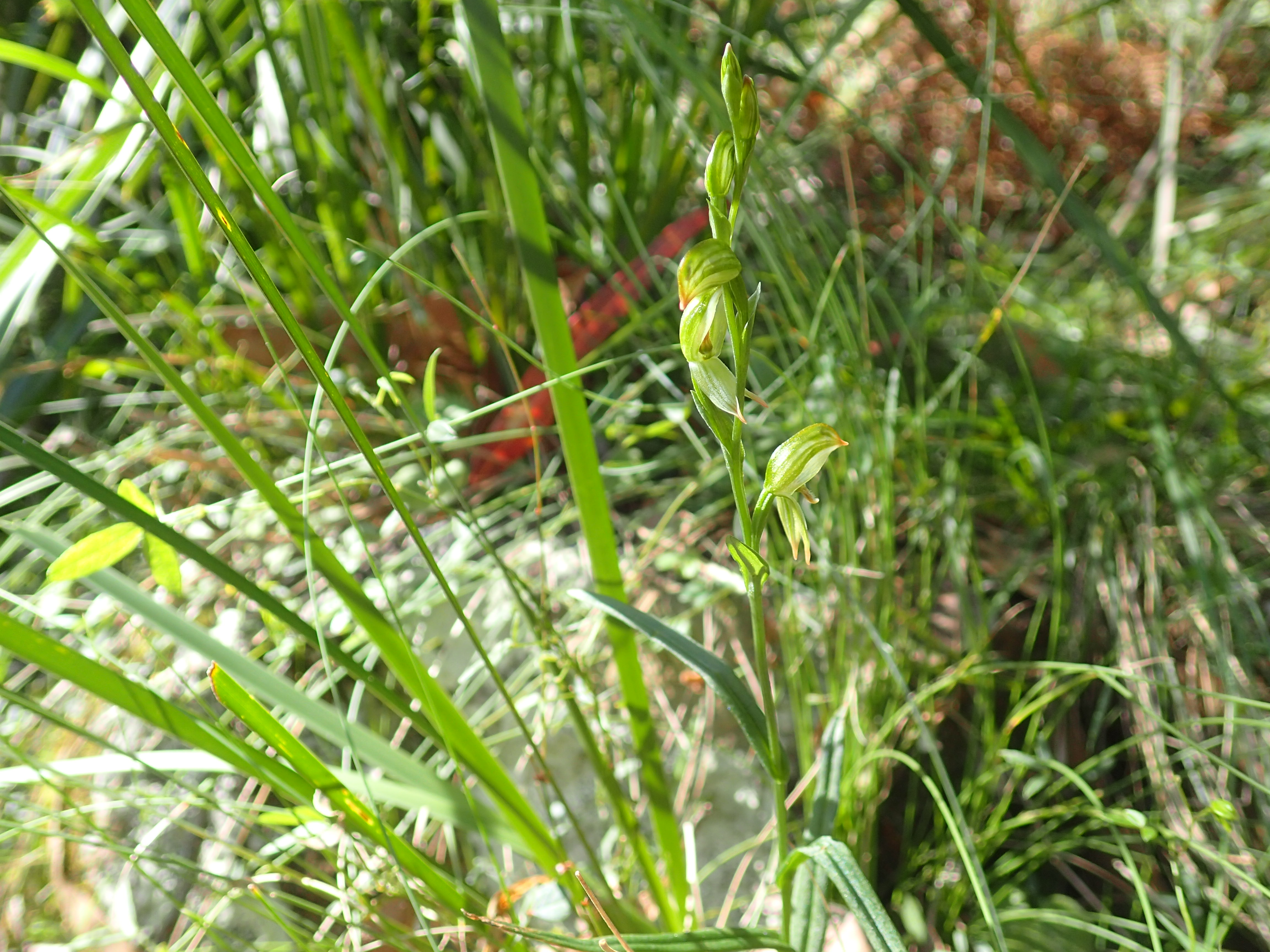
Flowering stem

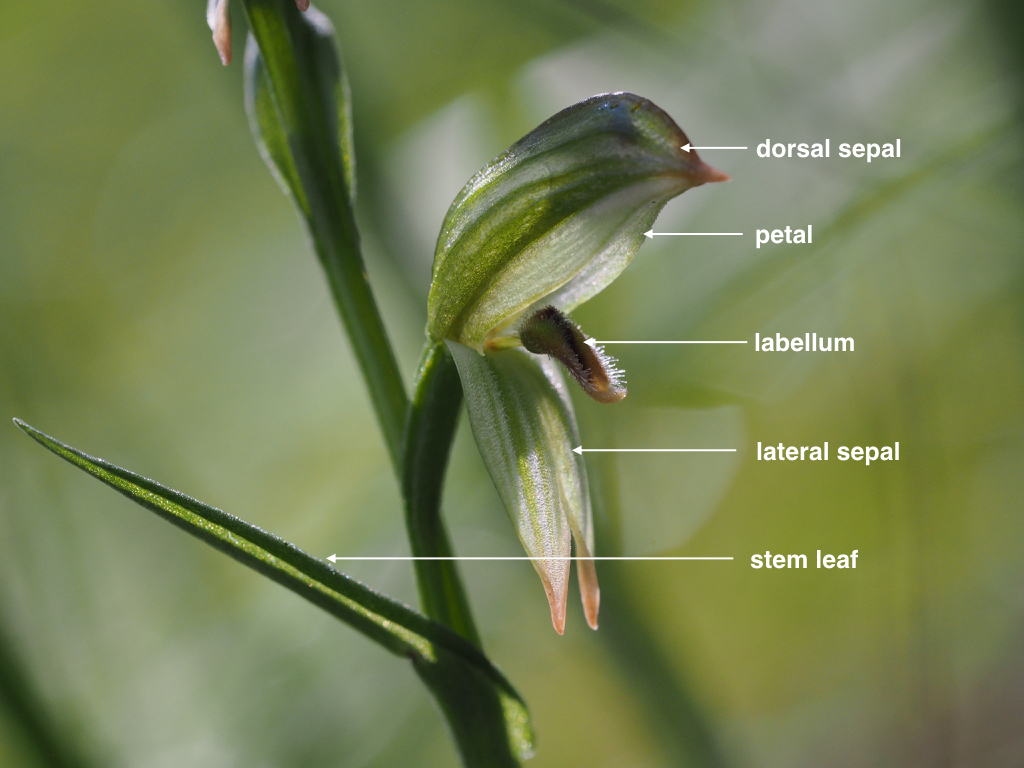
Labelled image

== Description ==
Pterostylis longifolia, is a terrestrial, perennial, deciduous, herb with an underground tuber. Non-flowering plants have a rosette of between three and six, linear to lance-shaped leaves, each leaf 10–40 mm (0.4–2 in) long and 3–4 mm (0.1–0.2 in) wide. Flowering plants have up to seven green, partly transparent flowers on a flowering spike 150–400 mm (6–20 in) high. The flowering spike has between five and eight stem leaves which are 30–90 mm (1–4 in) long and 3–5 mm (0.1–0.2 in) wide. The flowers are 12–14 mm (0.5–0.6 in) long, 6–8 mm (0.2–0.3 in) wide. The lateral sepals turn downwards and have a tapering tip, 10–12 mm (0.4–0.5 in) long, 5–7 mm (0.2–0.3 in) wide. The labellum is about 5 mm (0.2 in) long, 3 mm (0.1 in) wide, pale green and hairy with a dark stripe along its mid-line. Flowering occurs from April to September.

== Taxonomy and naming ==
Pterostylis longifolia was first formally described in 1810 by Robert Brown and the description was published in Prodromus Florae Novae Hollandiae et Insulae Van Diemen. The specific epithet (longifolia) is derived from the Latin words longus meaning "long" and folium meaning "leaf".

== Distribution and habitat ==
Pterostylis longifolia occurs in New South Wales and southern Queensland on the coast and tablelands, growing in forest and coastal scrub.
