= Epiroc MT65 Minetruck =

Off-highway haul truck

Overview
- Manufacturer: Epiroc (formerly Atlas Copco)
- Production: October 2016-present
- Assembly: Örebro, Sweden

Body and chassis
- Class: Off-highway
- Body style: Articulated hauler
- Layout: Front-engine, Four-wheel-drive

Powertrain
- Engine: Cummins QSK19
- Transmission: Six speed

Dimensions
- Curb weight: 46,300kg

The Epiroc MT65 Minetruck (formerly Atlas Copco MT65 Minetruck) is a 65-Tonne capacity Off-highway Articulated hauler developed and produced in Sweden by Epiroc. It serves as the flagship model of Epiroc’s Minetruck range and has a focus on optimising efficiency and capacity in an Underground hard-rock mining setting.

== Development ==
In August 2016, Atlas Copco announced the MT65 to the Australian market at an event in Perth, Western Australia, due to the model undergoing rigorous testing at WA’s Gwalia Gold Mine., with a global announcement at MINExpo International in Las Vegas on September 30th, 2016.

The MT65 Minetruck is a development of Atlas Copco’s MT6020, a 60 Tonne capacity underground hauler released in 2008. The MT65 brought the companies acclaimed Rig Control System (RCS), initially used on its Boomer and Simba series drills, to the Minetruck series, replacing traditional analog gauges, along with offering advanced programming and monitoring options, greatly reducing the chances failure of previously unmonitored components of the machine. The addition of RCS to the Minetruck also brought integrated, electronic load weighing, indispensable in modern computer-based production tracking systems like Micromine’s Pitram.

== MT65 S ==
Released in March 2023, The Epiroc MT65 S Minetruck brought further software optimisation, transmission and final drive ratios, along with automation readiness.

The MT65 S also standardized an updated Auto-Retarder, introduced towards the end of the Standard MT65’s production, automatically applying the Retarder prior to the overspeed alarm activating.
