= Stawell Post Office =

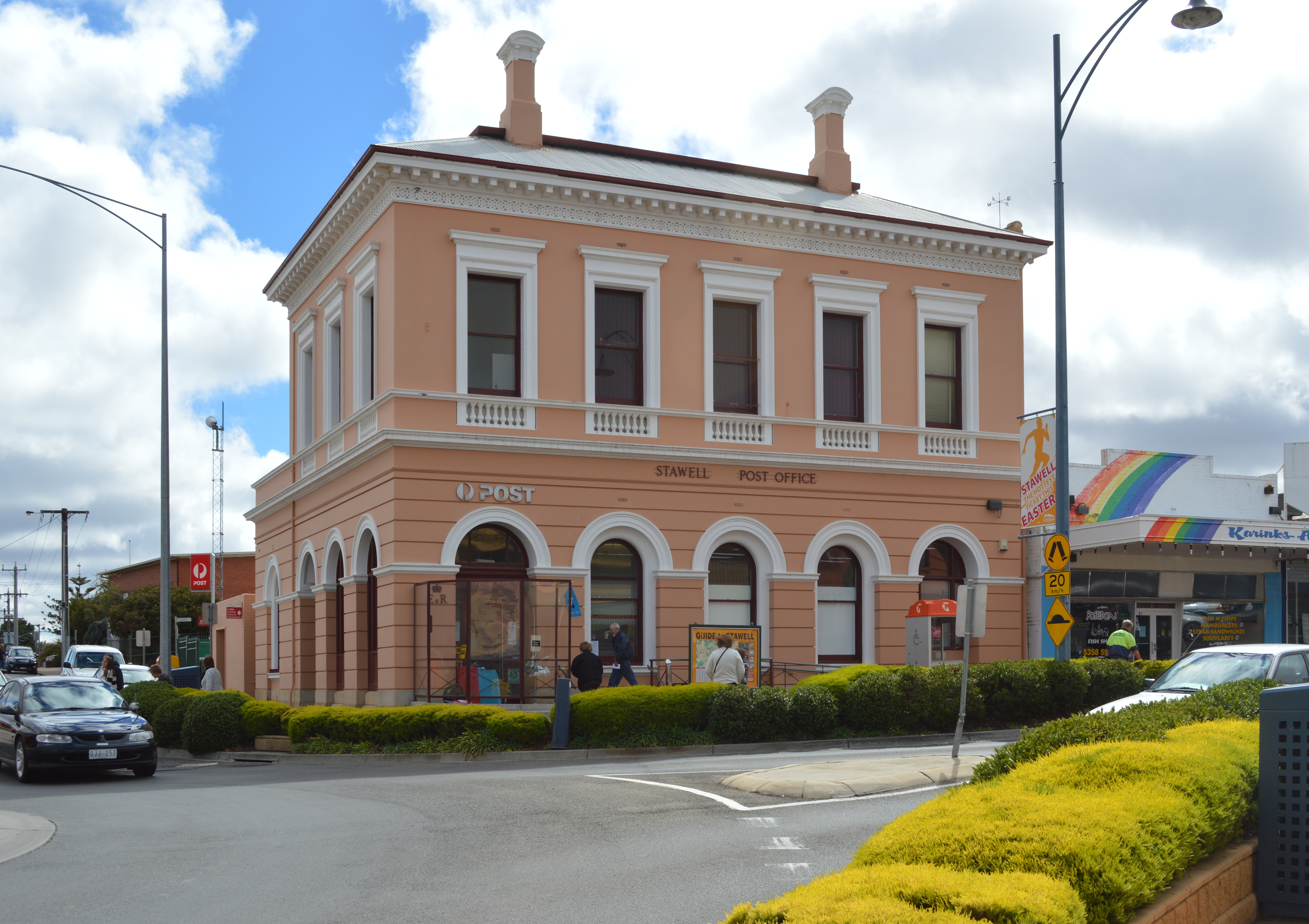

- Location within Victoria
- 37.0562°S 142.7801°E
- Location: 87–89 Gold Reef Mall, Stawell, Victoria, Australia

Commonwealth Heritage List
- Official name: Stawell Post Office
- Type: Listed place (Historic)
- Designated: 22 June 2004
- Reference no.: 105513

Stawell Post Office is a heritage-listed post office at 87–89 Gold Reef Mall, Stawell, Victoria, Australia. It was designed by Alfred T. Snow of the colonial Department of Public Works and built by Thomas Walker in 1874–75. It was added to the Australian Commonwealth Heritage List on 22 June 2004.

== History ==
Postal services to the Stawell region began during the late 1850s, with two formal post offices opening at Pleasant Creek (Stawell West) in 1857, and Quartz Reef (Stawell) in 1859. In 1869 the two settlements were joined and the Pleasant Creek Post Office ceased its operations. In 1873 plans were prepared by Department of Public Works' architect Alfred T. Snow for the erection of a more substantial post office building. Works were commenced by Thomas Walker in 1874 and the structure was completed in early 1875 at a cost of £5,501.

In c. 1878, the original corner loggia providing access to delivery and receiving windows was infilled with panelled timber doors and glazed screens, possibly to incorporate the area into the building due to increased space requirements or to provide protection to loggia porch. A postal slip was also installed in principal elevation at that time. In 1905, a telephone exchange was installed and a small rear addition constructed at northwest corner of original building. The southeast corner of the building or original loggia, used as the telephone room by 1923, may have been created at this time.

Extensive internal alterations were carried out in 1923. Ground floor changes included reorientation of the main post office after removing the telephones and associated equipment from the former loggia space. The wall between the former loggia and post office was completely removed, extending the post office to the external wall along Wimmera Street. The works may have included the creation of a second entrance to the public space from the former private side porch in Wimmera Street. A wall between the mail room and post master's office was also demolished, extending the mail room into the original passage. A new telephone switchboard and public telephone is installed in the former "private" room (kitchen wing?), opening onto the mail room. Around this time first floor staff amenities wing was probably added at northwest corner of original building. Alterations also carried out to storeroom and offices in yard and the whole building electrically lit.

The original signage was altered at some stage between 1943 and the 1960s. A general refurbishment in the 1960s included installation of oil heaters and brick surrounds in fireplaces; installation of wallpaper and vinyl tile finishes, and new kitchen joinery to the first floor tea room. A first floor partition was demolished to form one large room in lieu of two smaller rooms, and alterations were made to partitions in southern floor spaces at unknown dates. The date of the construction of the brick offices in the rear yard and the extension of the contractor's area behind the mail room to create post box bays and a lobby, as well as the demolition of the original rear fences and their replacement with brick walls and steel gates is also unknown.

In c. 1995, a disabled access ramp and screen was constructed along front elevation, and the public space was completely reoriented and refurbished including conversion of the north entrance door (original telegraph office entrance) in the principal elevation to a window. An office for the postal manager was constructed within rear mail room area and a partition wall installed within opening between the mail room and post office. An aluminium-framed sliding door was installed in the principal entrance. General interior refurbishment of finishes and fittings including lighting, heating, joinery was also undertaken.

== Description ==
Stawell Post Office is at 87–89 Gold Reef Mall (Main Street), corner Wimmera Street, Stawell.

The Stawell Post Office is located at the west end of Stawell's central shopping strip, now renamed Gold Reef Mall. The prominent corner site is unusually shaped with obtusely angled boundaries, which are transferred to the floor plan of the building itself. The building is constructed to the north, south and east boundaries with the rear yard largely absorbed by outbuildings and a concrete-paved apron. The imposing town hall complex is located nearby; the post office is otherwise in a streetscape comprising mainly nineteenth and early twentieth century commercial development.

The substantial building is a double-storey Victorian Italianate palazzo composition of rendered brick construction on a simple rectangular plan with single storey rear wing. The principal elevation is symmetrical with the lower storey given basement representation in palazzo terms, being constructed on a granite plinth and clad in smooth-rendered rustication to indicate stone. This has five astylar arches to the front, including three window openings flanked by original entrance door openings at each end; the northern doorway since converted to a window and the southern door fitted with an aluminium sliding door. The five upper level frontal windows have simple rectangular aedicules and flat cornices, intersecting a string course that acts as a balustrade when it crosses the window openings, and the balusters are waisted Italianate. The chain frieze and course-line balustrade both recall the Old Melbourne Treasury. Three similar arches are at the Wimmera Street (south) side, matched to a fourth arch with similar treatment fronting an extended ground floor side bay. Originally providing access to a side loggia, the easternmost two arches were filled at an early date with timber-framed glazed screens. The third arch leads to a recessed side porch access to the former quarters, and a non-original entrance to the post office.

The post office has a hipped roof clad in non-original, albeit early, galvanised iron. A flat section at the hip indicates the location of a former platform which was surrounded by a cast iron balustrade containing a flagpole for displaying the mail flag. The roof is framed by two rendered chimneys with moulded cornice. The main roof cornice is a substantial bracketed dentilled design with a chain-pattern frieze immediately below it.

=== Condition and integrity ===
Externally, the building's ability to demonstrate its original design is very good notwithstanding alterations to the loggia and telegraph entrance, and rear additions. The exterior of the building appears sound.

Internally, the building has undergone a number of phases of more extensive change in relation to planning, most notably related to the incorporation of an internal public space and the subsequent enlargement of this area and the removal of telegraph functions. The interior of the building is in good condition.

== Heritage listing ==
The Stawell Post Office, constructed in 1874–75, is an important two-storey public building in the Victorian Italianate style. The form and quality of the Stawell Post Office on a prominent corner in the central commercial precinct confirms its status as an essential element in the communications of the district at a time when Stawell was an important regional centre in the central goldfields district and the broader Victorian colony. The size and quality of the building reflects Stawell's status in the 1870s as a prosperous central goldfields town and important regional centre for the former colony of Victoria.

The Stawell Post Office, probably designed by A. T. Snow, is one of a suite of substantial Italianate post offices designed by the Victorian Public Works Department between 1870 and 1878 under the guidance of William Wardell. Stylistically, Stawell Post Office is a handsome and imposing composition, albeit displaying restrained ornament typical of the mid-Victorian palazzo idiom. While it lacks a prominent tower its bold palazzo style with rusticated "basement" and corner siting contribute to its stateliness and monumental expression. Stawell is a very good example of the style.

The building forms an important historic landmark with a strong relationship to the location of the town's former gold diggings. The bold Post Office building is a recognised local landmark within the main government and commercial precinct of Stawell, partnering with the nearby Town Hall. The building makes a major contribution to the historic streetscape. Having served the people of Stawell and surrounding districts as a crucial public facility and major landmark for over 125 years, the Stawell Post Office is socially significant to the local community.

The curtilage includes the title block/allotment of the property.

The significant components of Stawell Post Office include the main postal building of 1873–75. The single-storey 1905 addition is of contributory significance. The disabled access ramp and additions to the rear of the building including the first floor staff amenities, post box lobby, brick offices and storeroom are not significant. The telephone exchange to the rear of the post office is also not significant.
