= Ronnie Leten =

Belgian businessman (born 1956)

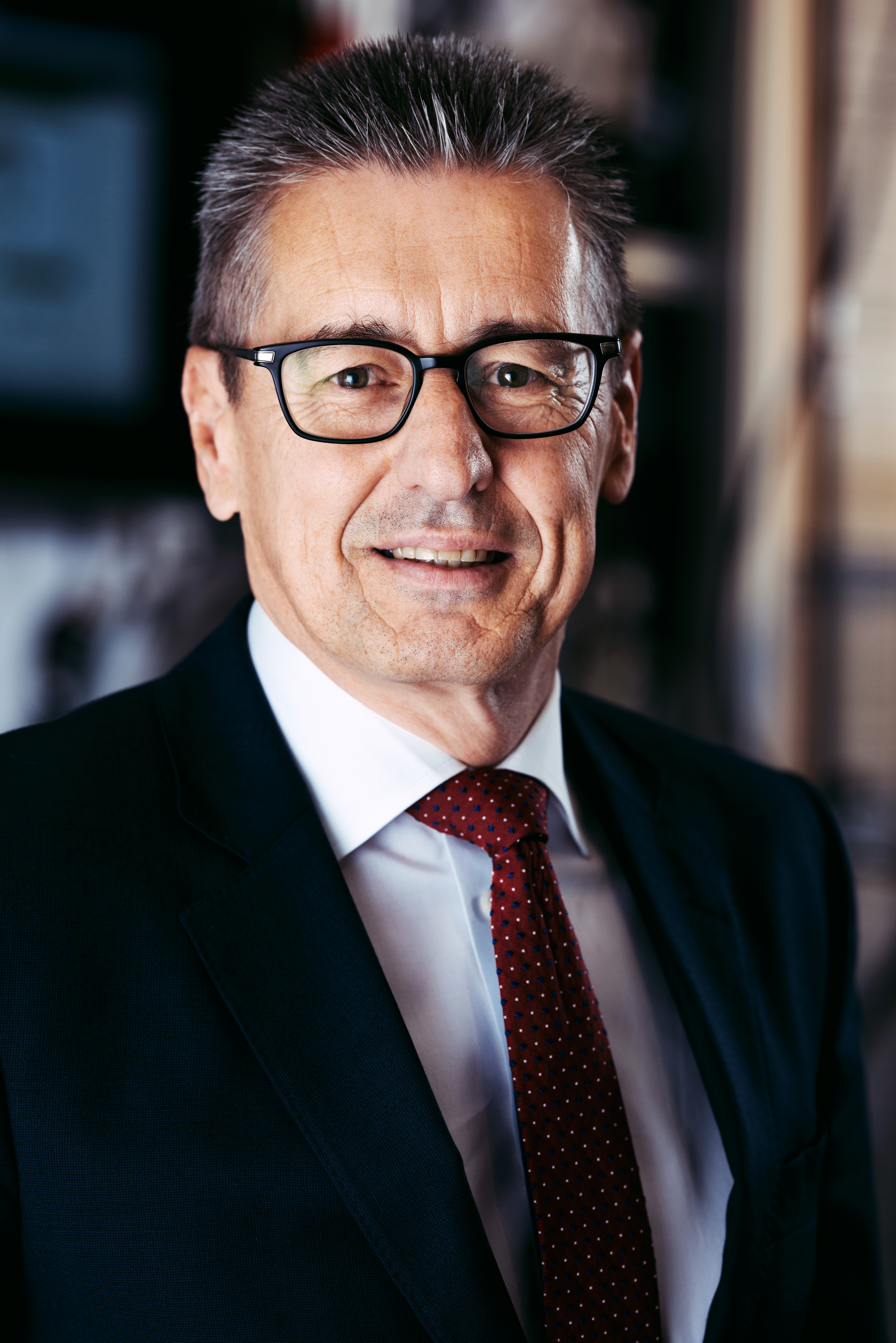
- Ronnie Leten
- Born: 12 December 1956 (age 69); Beringen, Belgium
- Education: University of Hasselt
- Occupation: Businessman

Ronnie Leten (born 12 December 1956) is a Belgian businessman. In 2018, Leten became the chairman of Ericsson and Epiroc.

== Career ==
Ronnie Leten graduated from the University of Hasselt, in 1979, with a master's degree in Business Administration. Leten began his working career at General Biscuit Belgie BVBA ('LU') from 1979-1985. He joined Atlas Copco, Belgium, in 1985. After a short period as production manager for Tenneco Automotive, he came back to Atlas Copco in 1995. Between 1999-2001 he was president of the Airtec division. From 2001-2006 he was president of the Industrial Air division. Between 2006 and 2009 he was the business area president for the Compressor Technique business area. He was the president and CEO of Atlas Copco from 2009 to 2017. In 2018, Ronnie Leten became the chairman of Ericsson and Epiroc. Epiroc was created in 2018 from Atlas Copco's Mining and Rock Excavation Technique business area. Ronnie Leten was chairman for Piab and member of the board for SKF.

== Board assignments/memberships ==
- 2017 to present - Kungliga Ingenjörsvetenskapsakademien or Royal Swedish Academy of Engineering Sciences. Member of the Academy.
- 2017 to 2021 - Svenska Kullagerfabriken or 'Swedish Ball Bearing Factory'. Member of the board.
- 2017 to present - Epiroc. Chairman of the board.
- 2018 to 2023 - Ericsson. Chair of the board of directors, chair of the finance committee, member of the remuneration committee.
- 2019 to 2022 - Piab. chair.
- 2012 to 2018 - Electrolux. Board member from 2012 and chairman of the board from 2014.
- 2009 to 2017 - Atlas Copco (32 years).

== Recognition/awards ==
- 2019: Receiver of Doctor Honoris Causa from UHasselt University, Belgium.
- 2019: Named Knight of the North Star Order, first class, by Swedish King Carl Gustaf (Original Swedish title of recognition: "Riddare av Nordtsjärneordern, första klass".)
- 2018: Receiver of the Queen Astrid Award, Belgium
- 2018: Commander in the Order of Merit of the Italian Republic (OMRI)
- 2016: Harvard Business Review ranks him 52nd best CEO in the world.
- 2014: Commander in the Order of Leopold II, Belgium
- 2013: Manager of the Year, Belgium.
