= Agua Negra Pass =

Pass which connects Argentina and Chile

Paso de Agua Negra
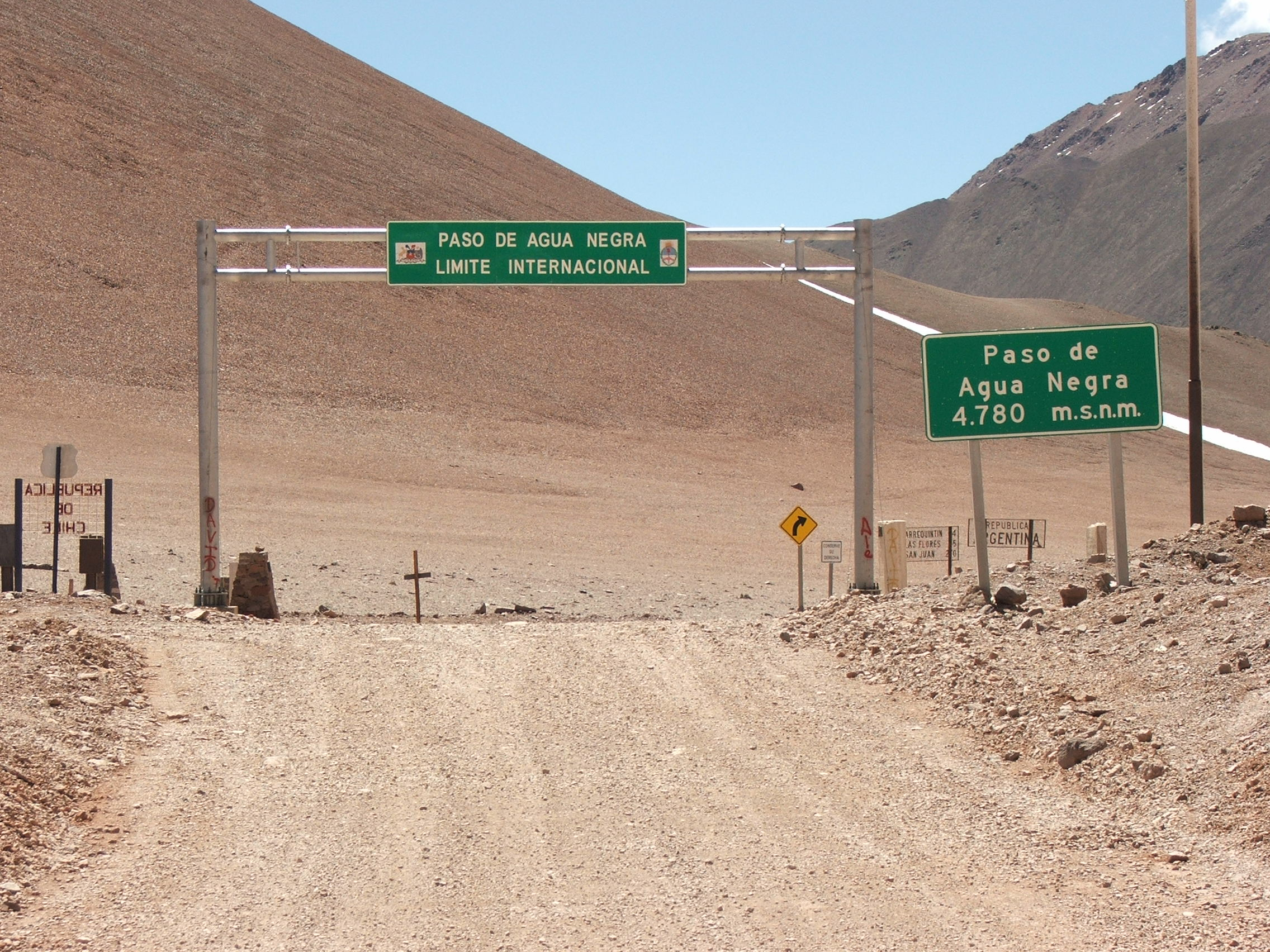
- Signs marking the border between Argentina and Chile at the top of Paso de Agua Negra.

- Location within Argentina
- Elevation: 4,775 m (15,666 ft)

Location
- Location: Argentina–Chile border
- Range: Andes
- Coordinates: 30°11′32″S 69°49′06″W

The Agua Negra Pass (Spanish: Paso de Agua Negra) is a pass over the Andes Mountains which connects Argentina and Chile. The highest point of this pass is at 4,780 m (15,680 ft) AMSL.

== Agua Negra Tunnel ==
To improve trade between Chile and Argentina, a 14 km, three-bore vehicular tunnel (two for traffic and one for ventilation) below the pass was planned, allowing year-round traffic. (The pass is closed for much of the winter.)

In March 2015, Argentina officially approved the project.

In 2018, the bidding contest for the tunnel project between construction companies took place. The whole project was budgeted at 1.5 billion dollars.

Also proposed for the deepest part of the tunnel was the Agua Negra Deep Experiment Site (ANDES) (ANDES): an underground laboratory. Because all currently operating deep underground laboratories are located in the Northern Hemisphere, a Southern Hemisphere site would have some unique benefits:

- Combined with existing neutrino detectors, a longer baseline would allow more accurate localization of sources in neutrino astronomy, and
- When searching for dark matter, there is expected to be a seasonal variation due to the Earth's motion around the Sun. But such a signal could also be an error, caused by some subtle seasonal effect. Confirmation from a location with opposite seasons would rule out such an error.

ANDES is not expected to be ready before 2027.

In 2020, the Chilean government under President Sebastián Piñera rejected the IADB loan for the tunnel, halting the project.

== Gallery ==
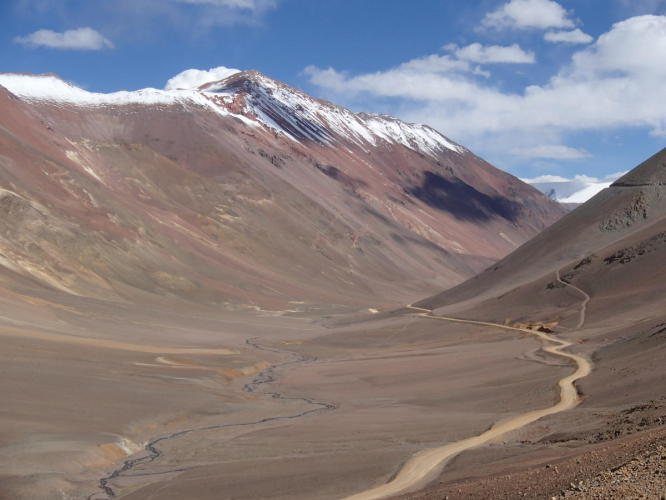
Paso de Agua Negra, Argentine side

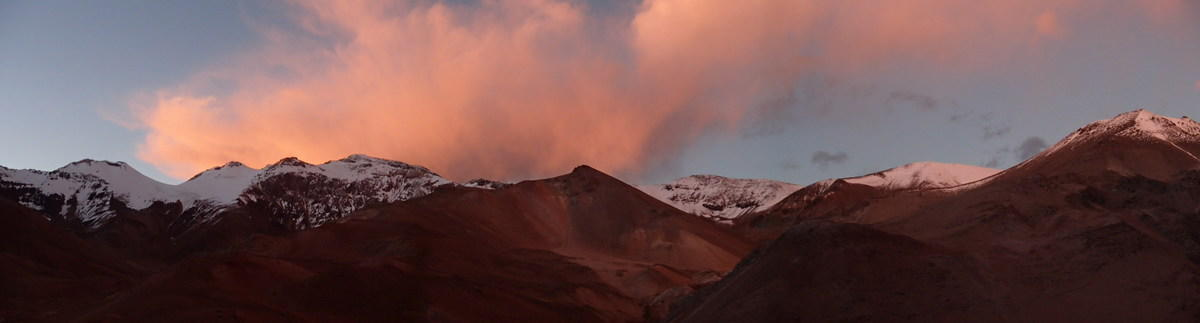
Paso de Agua Negra, Chilean side

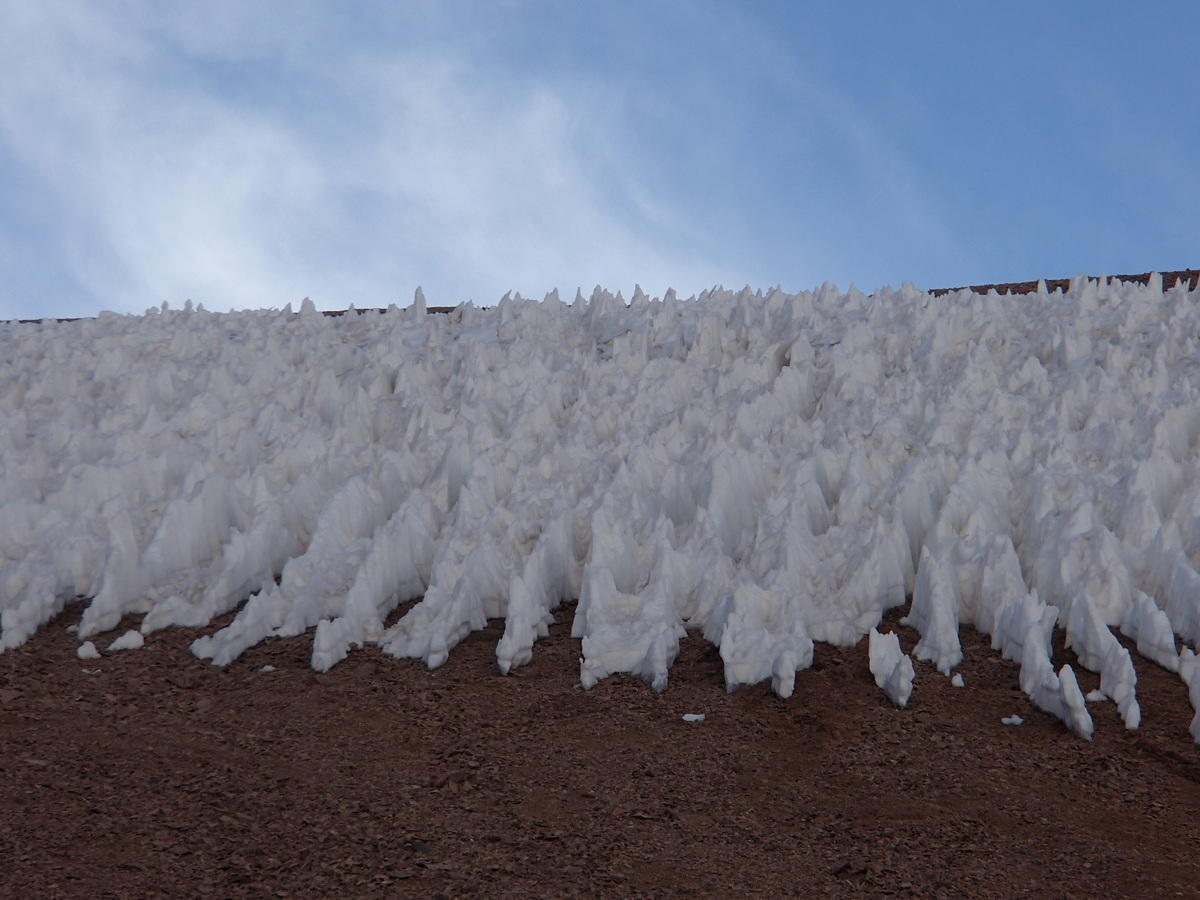
Penitentes near the summit

== See also ==
- Elqui Province, Chile
- San Juan Province, Argentina
