= Agua Negra Deep Experiment Site =

Construction experiment

The Agua Negra Deep Experiment Site (ANDES) is a project for the construction and operation of an underground laboratory in the Agua Negra Tunnel, between Argentina and Chile. Argentina, Brazil, Chile, and Mexico are involved in this project and are also expected to integrate the whole international scientific community.

== Possible scientific research areas ==
Neutrino physics: For the study of geoneutrinos, underground laboratories in the absence of close by nuclear power plants are necessary. Detailed studies of the nature and mass of the neutrinos help in our understanding of Nature (geoneutrinos are related to the thermal equilibrium of the Earth).

Dark Matter: Experiments in this field greatly benefit from being in very deep underground laboratories. It involves usually huge detection mass, very low detection thresholds, and excellent control of the detector backgrounds. Furthermore, an indirect way to detect dark matter is to find a modulation caused by the movement of the Earth in the halo of dark matter. A laboratory located in the southern hemisphere could unambiguously discriminate between atmospheric-induced backgrounds and dark matter signals.

Geoscience: The zone of the Agua Negra Pass one of the world's most seismically active regions. This is ideal to place highly sensitive seismographs, able to record seismic frequencies from around 1 Hz, of local earthquakes, to very ultra-long periods of more than 100 sec of the earth normal modes vibrations excited by a large earthquake. For these measurements, low background noise is required and can be achieved at an underground laboratory.

Biology: Experiments in a deep underground laboratory could investigate the possible contribution of cosmic radiation to the basal DNA damage, as it free from this kind of radiation. This damages can develop pathologies like cancer.

Low radioactivity measurements: the new generation of detectors used in the dark matter and neutrino underground experiments require the ability to measure extremely low radiation levels. These measurements are also useful in multiple areas like ecology, glaciology, microelectronics and in the selection of pure materials with almost no radioactive content. Nuclear astrophysics can also be researched with dedicated equipment.

== International support ==
The ANDES deep underground project has support from different institutions and scientists, both in Latin America and worldwide. The governments of Argentina and Chile have expressed their support for the development of the project.

== See also ==
- Deep Underground Neutrino Experiment (DUNE), a 1300 km detector between Fermilab and Sanford Underground Research Facility.
- List of neutrino experiments
