= Stawell, Victoria =

Stawell
- Town
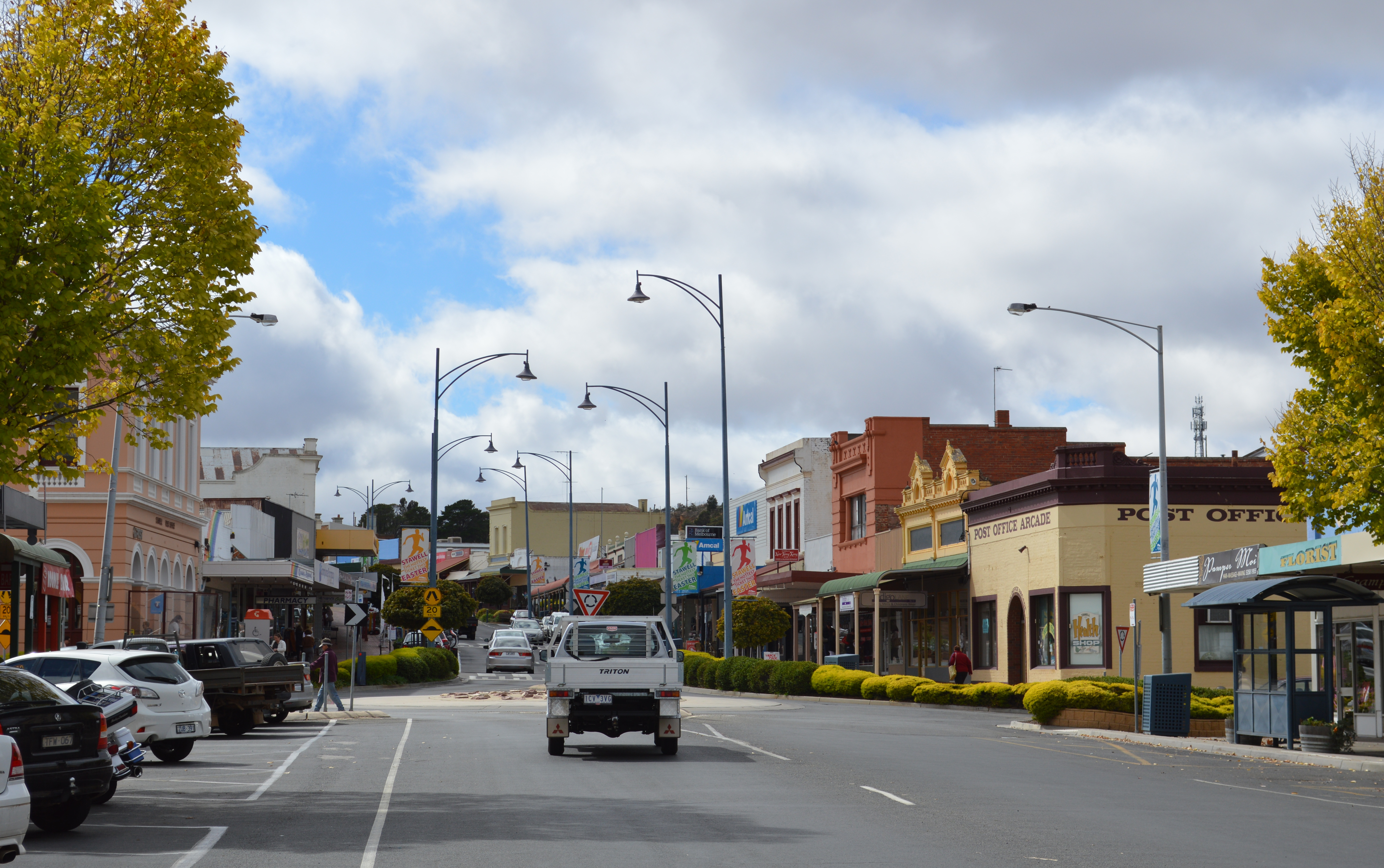
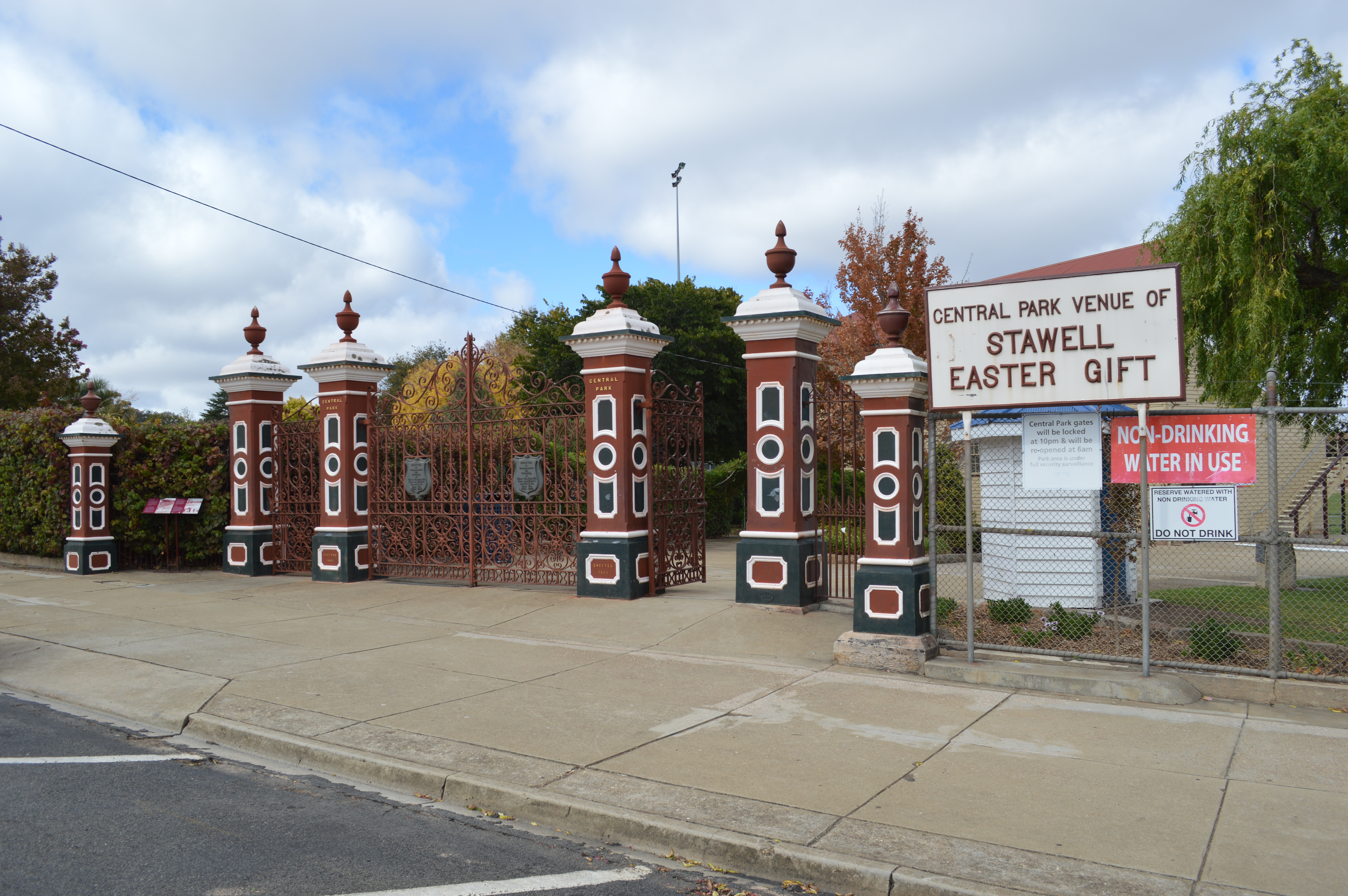
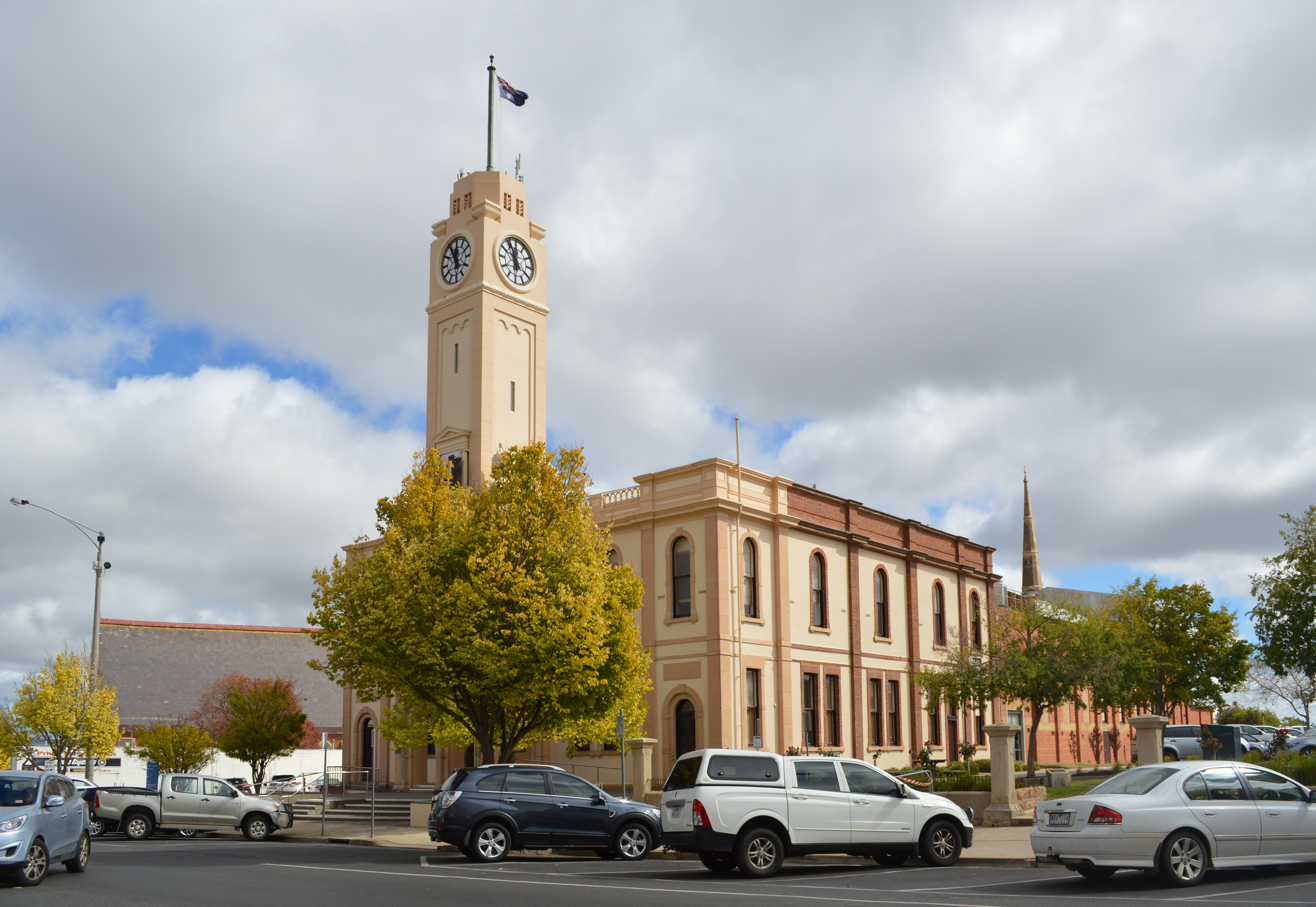
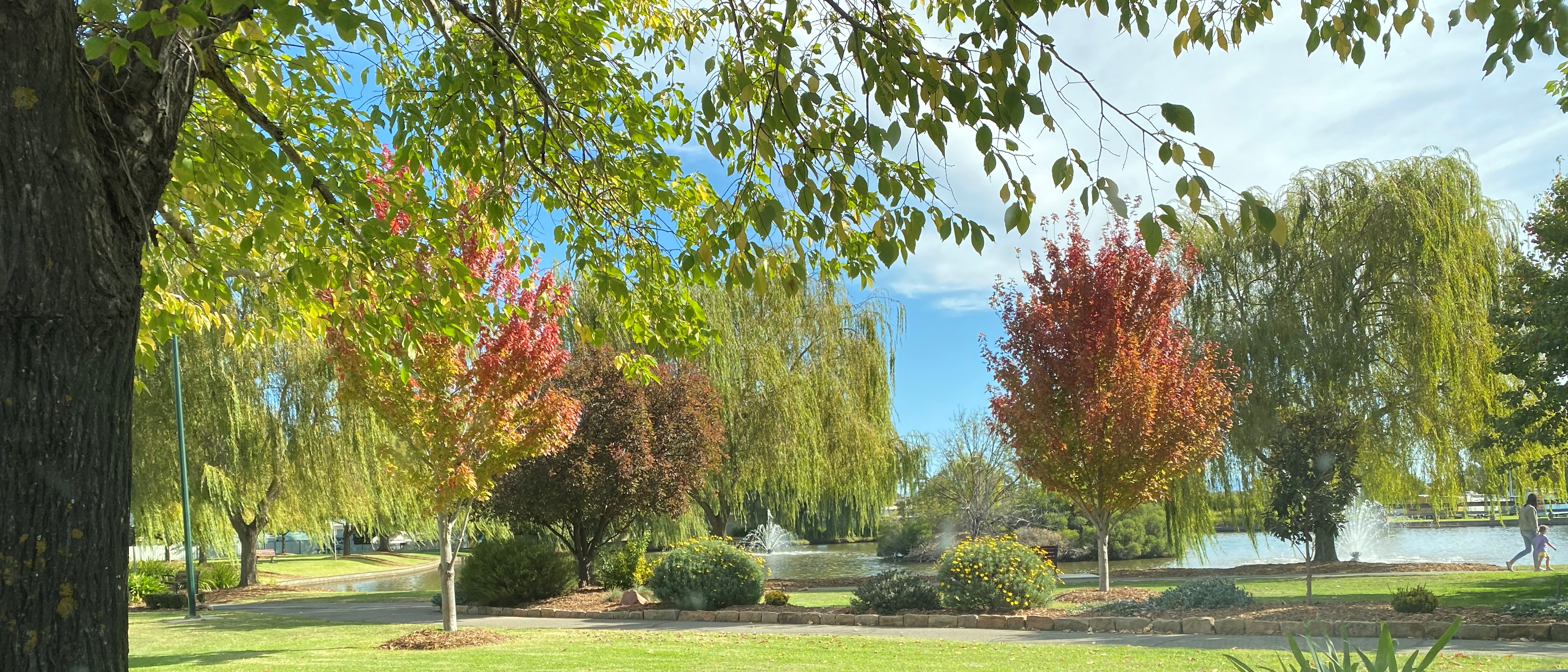
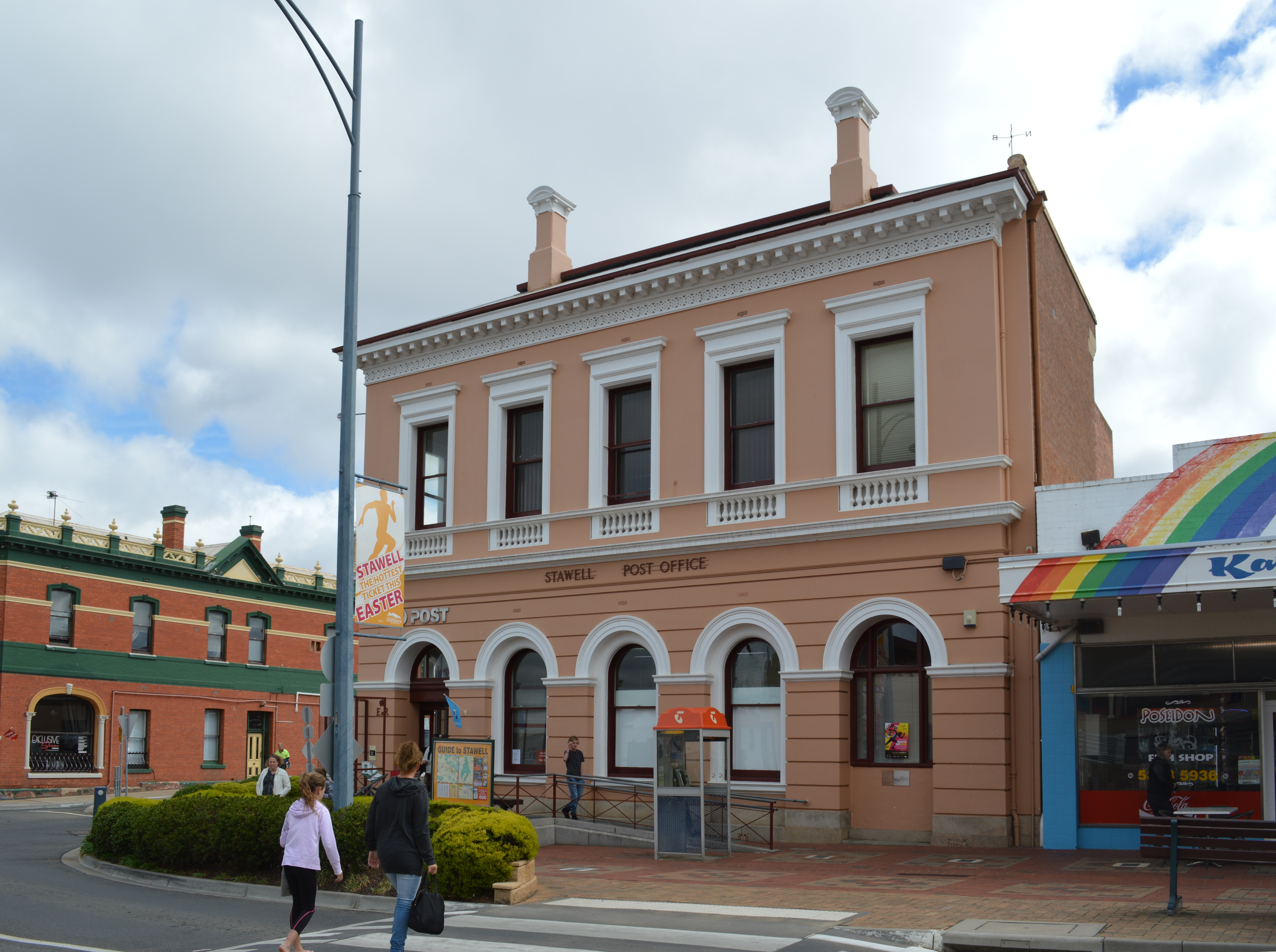
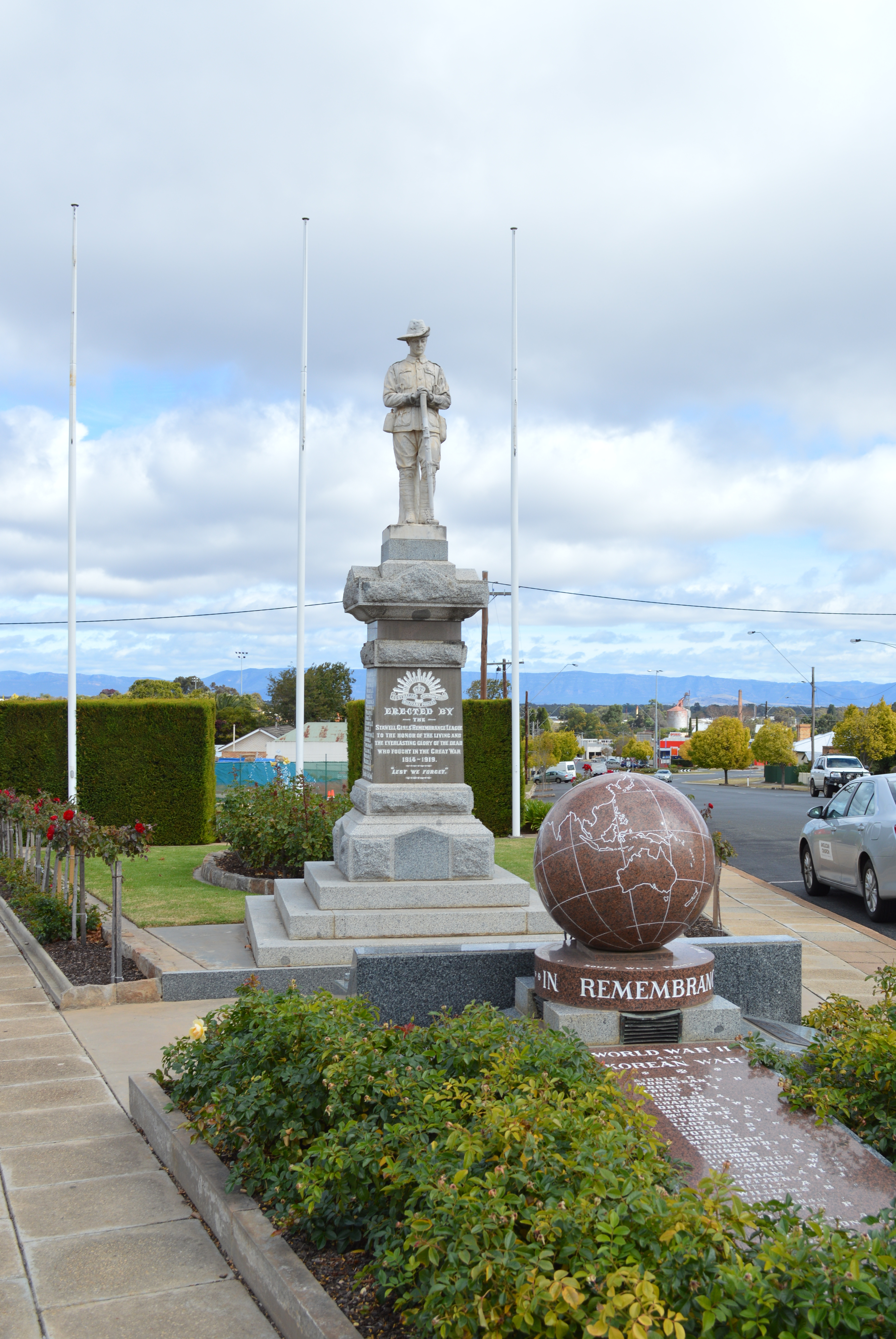
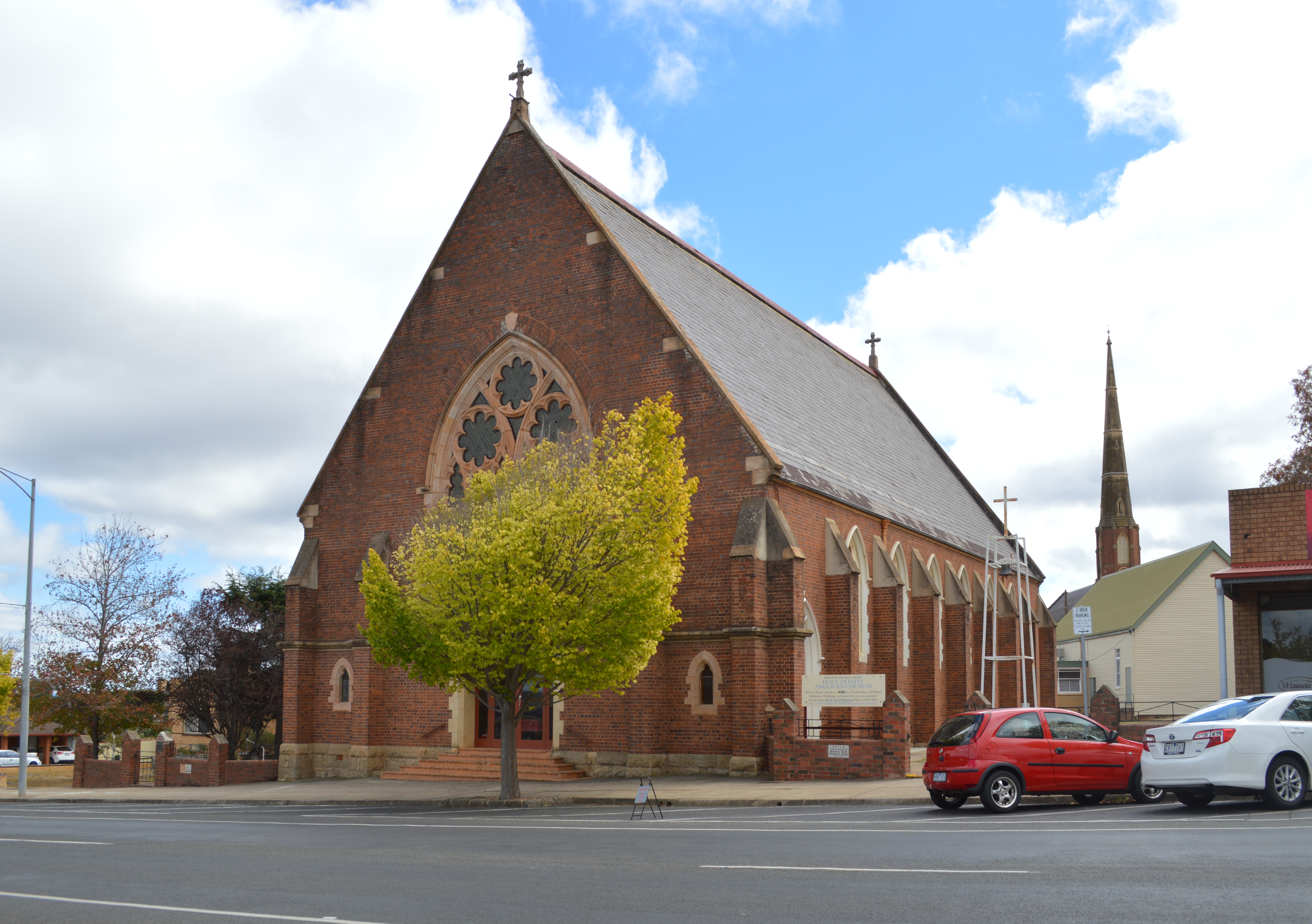
- Main Street, Stawell Central Park Town Hall Cato Park Post Office War Memorial Holy Trinity Anglican Church

- Coordinates: 37°03′0″S 142°46′0″E
- Country: Australia
- State: Victoria
- LGA: Shire of Northern Grampians
- Location: 237 km (147 mi) WNW of Melbourne; 124 km (77 mi) WNW of Ballarat; 68 km (42 mi) SE of Horsham; 31 km (19 mi) NW of Ararat; 28 km (17 mi) NE of Halls Gap
- Established: 1853

Government
  - State electorate: Lowan
  - Federal division: Mallee
- Elevation: 231 m (758 ft)

Population
  - Total: 6,220 (2021 census)
- Postcode: 3380
- County: Borung
- Mean max temp: 20.1 °C (68.2 °F)
- Mean min temp: 8.5 °C (47.3 °F)
- Annual rainfall: 533.4 mm (21.00 in)

Stawell (/stɔːl/ "stall"), is a town in the Wimmera region of Victoria, Australia, 237 kilometres (147 mi) west-north-west of the state capital, Melbourne. Located within the Shire of Northern Grampians local government area, it is a seat of local government for the shire and its main administrative centre. At the 2021 census, Stawell had a population of 6,220.

It was founded in 1853 as Pleasant Creek during the Victorian gold rush. It is one of few towns in Victoria retaining an active gold mining industry.

Stawell is famed for the Stawell Gift, a professional foot race that began in 1878. It is also known as the gateway to the Grampians National Park. One of the most significant Aboriginal cultural sites in south-eastern Australia is Bunjil's Shelter, within the Black Range Scenic Reserve, south of Stawell.

It is named after Sir William Foster Stawell (1815–89), the Chief Justice of Victoria.

== Indigenous people ==
Aboriginal peoples of Victoria lived in the Stawell area for many thousands of years before the colonisation of Australia. The formally recognised traditional owners for the area north-east of the Horsham and Ararat roads, are the Wotjobaluk, Jardwadjali (also known as Jaadwa), Wergaia and Jupagalk nations. These nations are represented by the Barengi Gadjin Land Council Aboriginal Corporation. In the area of Stawell that is south-west of Horsham and Ararat roads traditional owners have not yet been formally recognised; however, the Eastern Maar Aboriginal Corporation (EMAC) is negotiating a recognition and settlement agreement with the Victorian Government. The boundary of the agreement is under negotiation. The Eastern Maar people are represented by the Eastern Maar Aboriginal Corporation. The language spoken in the area is Djab Wurrung, and the local placename for Stawell in the indigenous language is Yirip.

== Colonial history ==
William McLachlan discovered alluvial gold at Pleasant Creek in May 1853, but the yield was not in sufficient volumes to attract much interest, as the Ballarat and Bendigo fields were known to be giving better results, and had already established the infrastructure to support the miners. There was however sufficient numbers for the area to support the beginnings of a settlement. The town site was first settled during 1853 and was named Pleasant Creek. The mining population of the Stawell field remained relatively small (averaging 200 or less) until 1857 when a series of new alluvial gold discoveries were made.

In August 1857 more extensive prospecting and mining occurred at what became known as Commercial Street, Pleasant Creek.

Two Post Offices were opened, Pleasant Creek on 19 October 1857 and Quartz Reef, Pleasant Creek on 1 June 1859. In 1858 diggers opened the Great Western goldfield, which was worked by some 9,000 prospectors. The prospecting spread to nearby Deep Lead, about 6 kilometres to northwest, and it was reported that at the height of the rush there were over 25,000 people in the area. At the same time, shafts were being sunk around Big Hill, becoming known as the Quartz Reefs. Much alluvial gold was found in the area but the 'fossicking' petered out by 1859.

In 1864, the township was renamed to honour Sir William Stawell (1815–89), the Chief Justice of Victoria resulting in the name of the Pleasant Creek post office becoming "Stawell". The town was created a borough in 1869.

In 1870 Stawell post office was renamed Stawell West, and Quartz Reef, Stawell post office was renamed to Stawell. Stawell Town Hall was constructed in 1872, under the guidance of Stawell Shire Engineer, John D'Alton.

The former Free Library and Mechanics Institute building at 170 Main Street was constructed in 1874 to the design of Stawell architect, George Inskip. The building has served as the location of the Mechanics Institute, School of Design (later School of Mines) and the Borough Library. It is now the headquarters of Australian Regional Education.

The town's water supply system was designed by John D'Alton in 1875, diverting water from Fyan's Creek by tunnels and pipelines, construction was completed in 1881.

By the mid-1920s the gold mining had effectively ceased as the yields were found to be no longer commercially viable. A Pioneer's memorial was erected on Big Hill in 1938.

The town hall underwent significant postwar remodelling, culminating in the addition of the landmark clock tower in 1939.

The Quartz Gold Memorial and Dane Memorial seat were erected on Big Hill in 1953 out of local quartz stone.

Stawell's historical association with gold-mining was revived when full-scale mining recommenced in 1981 with the opening of the Stawell Gold Mine.

The mine was closed in 2016, following pressure from environmental protection agencies, following the mines plans to turn open cut. This was followed by fear that the town would become a ghost town of sorts, however, the mine reopened fully in early 2019.

== Demographics ==
As of the 2021 census, 6,220 people resided in Stawell. The median age of persons in Stawell was 47 years. Children aged 0–14 years made up 15.4% of the population. People over the age of 65 years made up 26.2% of the population. There were slightly more females than males with 50.6% of the population female and 49.4% male. The average household size is 2.2 people per household. The average number of children per family for families with children is 1.8.

79.9% of people in Stawell were born in Australia. Of all persons living in Stawell, 1.8% (115 persons) were Aboriginal and/or Torres Strait Islander people. This is higher than for the state of Victoria (1.0%) and lower than the national average (3.2%). The most common ancestries in Stawell were Australian 41.3%, English 39.9%, Scottish 10.8%, Irish 10.1% and German 4.7%.

== Governance ==
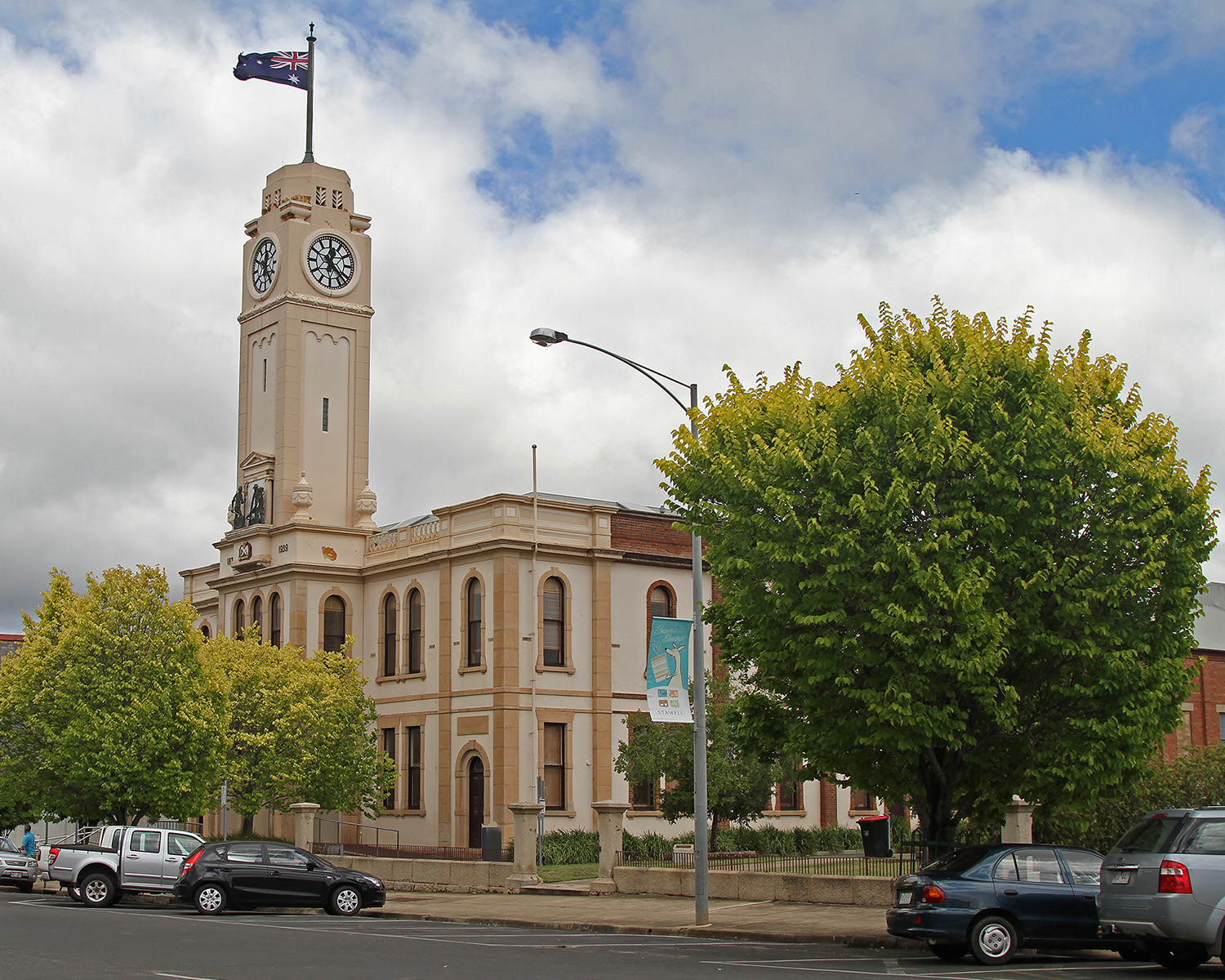
Stawell Town Hall, Main Street, the council's customer service centre

Stawell is a seat of local government for the Northern Grampians Shire (the other being St Arnaud). The council meets regularly at Council Chambers at the Shire's offices on the Western Highway. Stawell is also the main administrative centre for the council, with its customer service administration facility located at the Stawell Town Hall. The LGA was created in 1994 as an amalgamation of a number of other municipalities in the region and currently consists of 4 wards, each represented by one to three councillors elected once every four years by postal voting.

In state politics, Stawell is located in the Legislative Assembly electoral district of Lowan, currently held by Emma Kealy (National Party). Stawell is located within the Victorian Legislative Council's Western Victoria Region.

In federal politics, Stawell is located in a single House of Representatives division—the Division of Mallee.

== Economy ==
The economy of Stawell is sustained by the mining, agriculture, manufacturing, retail and tourism industries; the upcoming addition of the only neutrino observatory in the southern hemisphere, the Stawell Underground Physics Laboratory in a transitioning gold mine, represents a significant shift.

Stawell Hospital is a major regional hospital operated by Grampians Health

== Attractions ==
Stawell is situated not far from the Grampians National Park, about 32 kilometres (20 mi) by road from Halls Gap.

=== Bunjil's Shelter ===
One of the most significant Aboriginal cultural sites in south-eastern Australia is Bunjil's Shelter, which is the only known rock art depiction of Bunjil, the creator-being in Aboriginal Australian mythology. The shelter lies within the Black Range Scenic Reserve (not to be confused with the Black Range State Park), about 10 kilometres (6.2 mi) south of Stawell. It is a small shelter at the base of a large granite boulder.

== Education ==
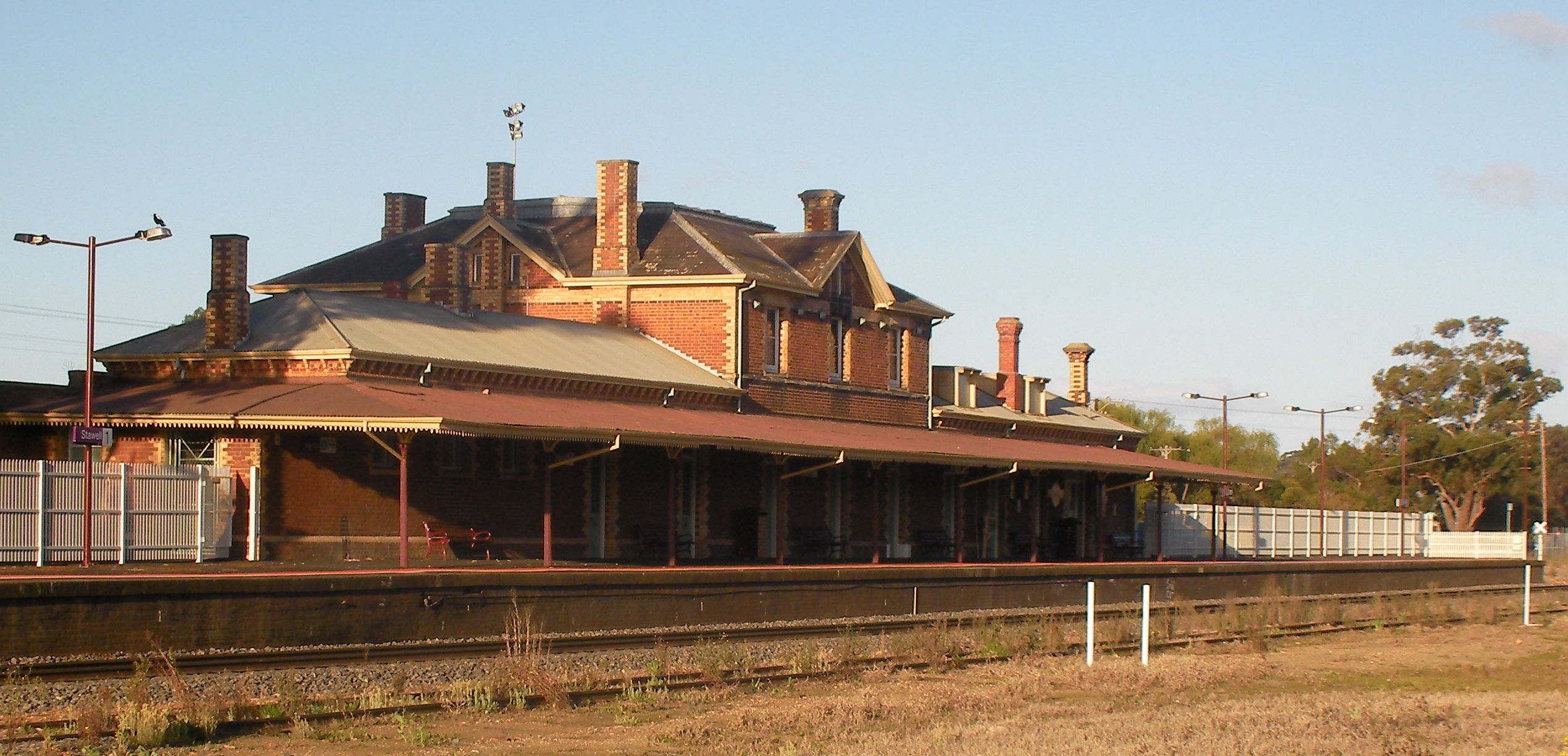
Stawell railway station

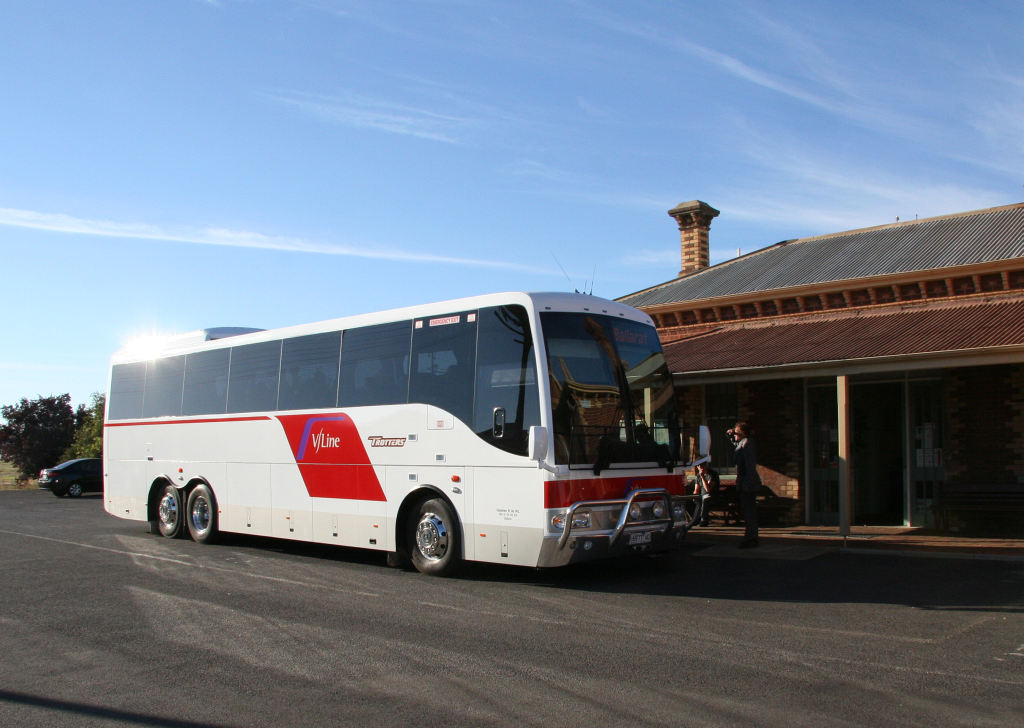
V/Line coach operating at the railway station

Secondary education is serviced by Stawell Secondary College. Primary education facilities include Stawell Primary School, Stawell West Primary School and St Patrick's Catholic Primary. Early childhood education facilities include Early Learning Centre, Taylor's Gully and Cooinda Kindergartens. Special education is provided by Skene Street School. Alternative High Schools include Ararat College and Marian College, both only a short drive away in the town of Ararat.

== Transport ==
Road transport is the main form of transport in Stawell. The town is at the junction of several major roads, the most significant being the Western Highway which bypasses the centre of town along Longfield Street linking it to the cities of Ararat, Ballarat and Melbourne in the east and the cities of Horsham and Adelaide to the west. The bypass has resulted in a new commercial centre spread along its length to the south of the town centre. Other significant roads include the Grampians Road (C216) used by many tourists on their journey to and from Halls Gap in the south west; Pomonal Road (C221) connecting it with the town of Pomonal to the south; Donald-Stawell Road (C238); and Navarre Road (C221) connecting it to the town of Navarre to the north. All major roads but the Western Highway converge in the town centre. Bus services operate from the Stawell railway station to nearby towns including Halls Gap.

Stawell railway station is the town's only operating rail station, having been reopened for The Overland passenger services between Melbourne and Adelaide in 2011. V/Line offer up to 60 seats on each Overland service for V/Line passengers travelling in Victoria. As at December 2019, it operates twice weekly; on Mondays, and Fridays for Melbourne and on Tuesdays and Saturdays for Adelaide.

Stawell Airport (IATA: SWC, ICAO: YSWL) is located 2 nautical miles (3.7 km; 2.3 mi) southwest on Grampians Road; it provides for general aviation.

== Sport ==
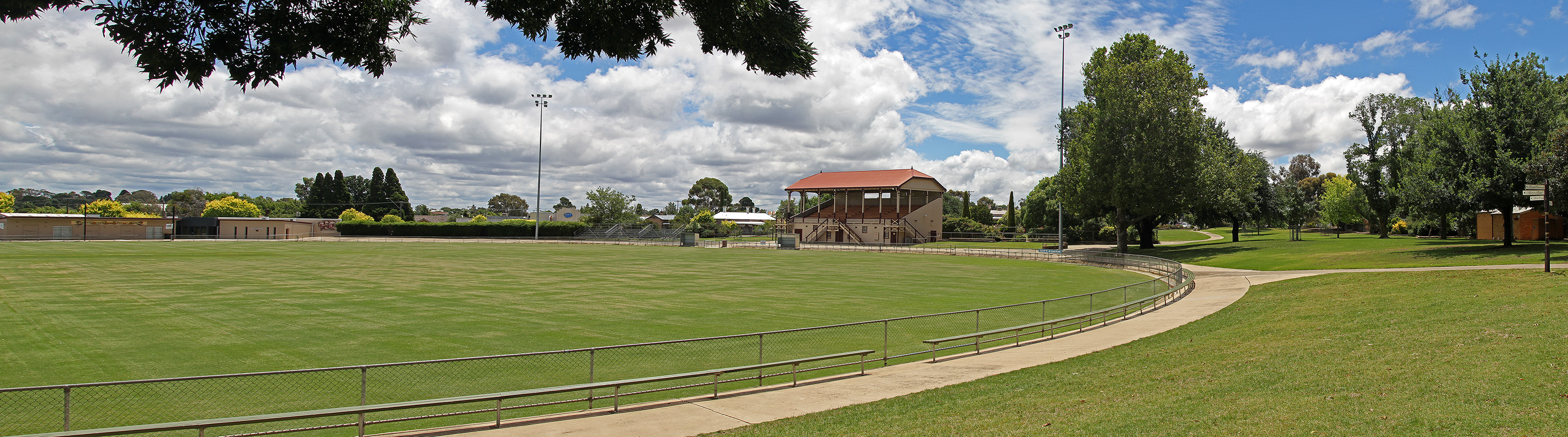
Central Park, Stawell's premier sporting ground, site of the Stawell Gift and home of several other sporting clubs

Along with the Stawell Gift, run each Easter long weekend by the Stawell Athletic Club, Stawell also has many other sporting outlets and teams.

The town has a main Australian rules football club, the Stawell Warriors, competing in the Wimmera Football League, and another team, the Stawell Swifts, competing in the Horsham & District Football League.

The town also has a rugby league club, the Stawell Mounties, who play in the Limestone Coast Rugby League. Their foundation in 2022 follows on from the now-defunct Stawell Devils who last played in the Central Highlands Rugby League in the 2000s.

The horse racing club, the Wimmera Racing Club, schedules around four race meetings a year at Stawell including the Stawell Cup meeting on Easter Sunday. The racecourse is on the south-western outskirts of the town, on Pomonal Road.

Stawell Harness Racing Club conducts regular meetings at its racetrack in the town.

Golfers play at the course of the Grange Golf Club on the Western Highway, Stawell, or at the course of the Stawell Golf Club on Marnoo Road.

== Notable people ==
Notable people from or who lived in Stawell include:

- George "Mick" Prendergast, Premier of Victoria
- Chuck Fleetwood-Smith, cricketer
- Frederick Wymark, Australiana collector, book collector and bookseller
- Stella Young

== Climate ==
Climate data for Stawell, elevation 235 m (771 ft), (1996–2024)
Month	Jan	Feb	Mar	Apr	May	Jun	Jul	Aug	Sep	Oct	Nov	Dec	Year
Record high °C (°F)	44.0 (111.2)	45.4 (113.7)	39.1 (102.4)	34.2 (93.6)	27.5 (81.5)	23.1 (73.6)	20.4 (68.7)	23.9 (75.0)	29.3 (84.7)	35.6 (96.1)	41.0 (105.8)	44.7 (112.5)	45.4 (113.7)
Mean daily maximum °C (°F)	29.4 (84.9)	28.4 (83.1)	25.3 (77.5)	20.7 (69.3)	16.2 (61.2)	13.2 (55.8)	12.5 (54.5)	13.9 (57.0)	16.7 (62.1)	20.0 (68.0)	23.7 (74.7)	26.6 (79.9)	20.5 (68.9)
Mean daily minimum °C (°F)	13.7 (56.7)	13.6 (56.5)	11.6 (52.9)	8.7 (47.7)	6.3 (43.3)	4.7 (40.5)	4.2 (39.6)	4.6 (40.3)	6.0 (42.8)	7.5 (45.5)	9.9 (49.8)	11.4 (52.5)	8.5 (47.3)
Record low °C (°F)	4.8 (40.6)	5.2 (41.4)	1.7 (35.1)	−0.6 (30.9)	−2.6 (27.3)	−3.2 (26.2)	−3.6 (25.5)	−3.7 (25.3)	−1.6 (29.1)	−0.6 (30.9)	0.9 (33.6)	3.5 (38.3)	−3.7 (25.3)
Average rainfall mm (inches)	37.6 (1.48)	25.7 (1.01)	19.5 (0.77)	29.7 (1.17)	40.1 (1.58)	54.2 (2.13)	54.1 (2.13)	54.9 (2.16)	48.9 (1.93)	39.7 (1.56)	40.7 (1.60)	34.1 (1.34)	477.9 (18.81)
Average rainy days (≥ 1.0 mm)	3.6	2.8	3.2	3.9	5.9	8.0	10.0	9.1	8.3	6.2	4.9	4.3	70.2
Source: Australian Bureau of Meteorology

== See also ==
- Grampians (region)
- Stawell Underground Physics Laboratory
- Stawell Gold Mine
