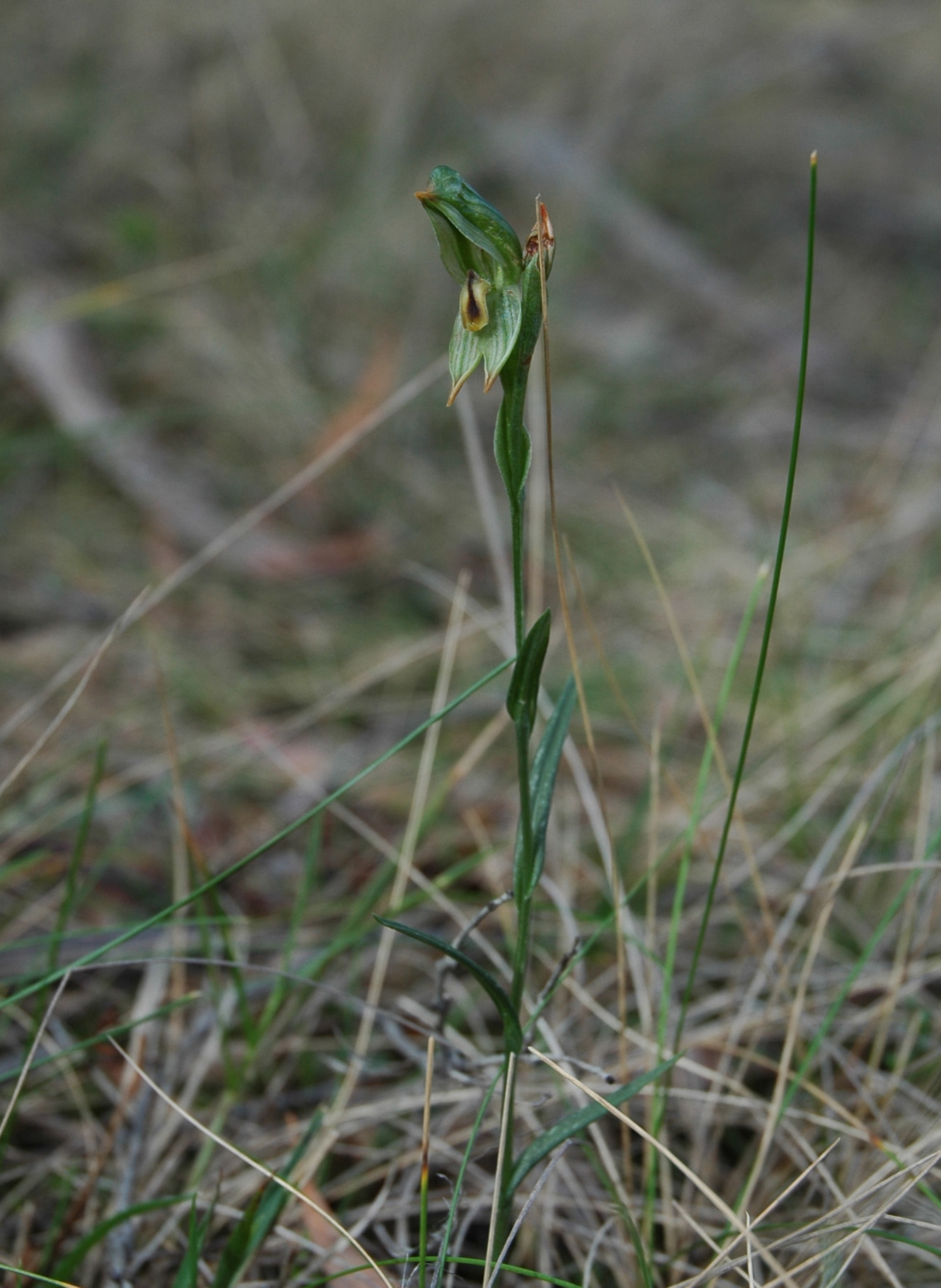
- In southern Tasmania

Scientific classification
- Kingdom: Plantae
- Clade: Tracheophytes
- Clade: Angiosperms
- Clade: Monocots
- Order: Asparagales
- Family: Orchidaceae
- Subfamily: Orchidoideae
- Tribe: Cranichideae
- Genus: Pterostylis
- Species: P. melagramma

Binomial name
- Pterostylis melagramma D.L.Jones

Synonyms
- Bunochilus melagrammus (D.L.Jones) D.L.Jones & M.A.Clem.; Oligochaetochilus melagramma Szlach. orth. var.; Oligochaetochilus melagrammus (D.L.Jones) Szlach.; Pterostylis sp. aff. longifolia (Southern Vic)

= Pterostylis melagramma =

Black-striped leafy greenhood

Species of orchid

Pterostylis melagramma, commonly known as black-stripe leafy greenhood is a plant in the orchid family Orchidaceae and is endemic to south-eastern Australia. Individual plants have either a rosette of three to six leaves or a flowering spike with up to twenty flowers and five to seven stem leaves. The flowers are translucent green with faint darker green lines and have a brownish-yellow labellum with a dark stripe.

== Description ==
Pterostylis melagramma, is a terrestrial, perennial, deciduous, herb with an underground tuber. Non-flowering plants have a rosette of between three and six narrow egg-shaped leaves, each leaf 13–50 mm (0.5–2 in) long and 4–11 mm (0.2–0.4 in) wide on a stalk 30–100 mm (1–4 in) high. Flowering plants have up to twenty translucent flowers with faint darker lines on a flowering spike 150–800 mm (6–30 in) high. The flowering spike has between five and seven stem leaves which are 25–80 mm (1–3 in) long and 5–10 mm (0.2–0.4 in) wide. The flowers are 13–15 mm (0.5–0.6 in) long, 4–8 mm (0.2–0.3 in) wide. The dorsal sepal and petals are joined to form a hood over the column with the dorsal sepal suddenly curving downwards near its tip which is often brown. The lateral sepals turn downwards and are 11–13 mm (0.4–0.5 in) long, 6–7 mm (0.2–0.3 in) wide and joined to each other for about half their length. The labellum is about 5 mm (0.2 in) long, 2 mm (0.08 in) wide, brownish-yellow and hairy with a dark stripe along its mid-line. Flowering occurs from June to November.

== Taxonomy and naming ==
Pterostylis melagramma was first formally described in 1998 by David Jones and the description was published in Australian Orchid Research. The specific epithet (melagramma) is derived from the Greek words melas, melanos meaning 'dark' or 'black' and gramme, 'line', referring to the dark stripe on the labellum.

== Distribution and habitat ==
Black-stripe leafy greenhood is widely distributed and common in higher rainfall areas of Victoria and Tasmania and also occurs in south-eastern South Australia and southern New South Wales.

== Conservation ==
This greenhood is classed as "endangered" in South Australia.
