= Epiroc =

Swedish mining services company

Epiroc AB
- Type: Aktiebolag
- Traded as: Nasdaq Stockholm: EPI A; Nasdaq Stockholm: EPI B; OMSX30 component
- Industry: Mining and infrastructure
- Founded: 1873; 153 years ago (as Atlas Copco); June 18, 2018; 8 years ago (as Epiroc)
- Headquarters: Nacka, Sweden
- Key people: Ronnie Leten (Chairman), Helena Hedblom (President and CEO)
- Revenue: SEK 60.2 BSEK (2023)
- Number of employees: 18,056 (2023)
- Website: epirocgroup.com epiroc.com

Epiroc AB is a Swedish manufacturer of mining and infrastructure equipment. It is headquartered in Stockholm, Sweden and has its manufacturing facilities in Sweden, the United States, Canada, Australia, China, India, Japan, and Germany.

== History ==
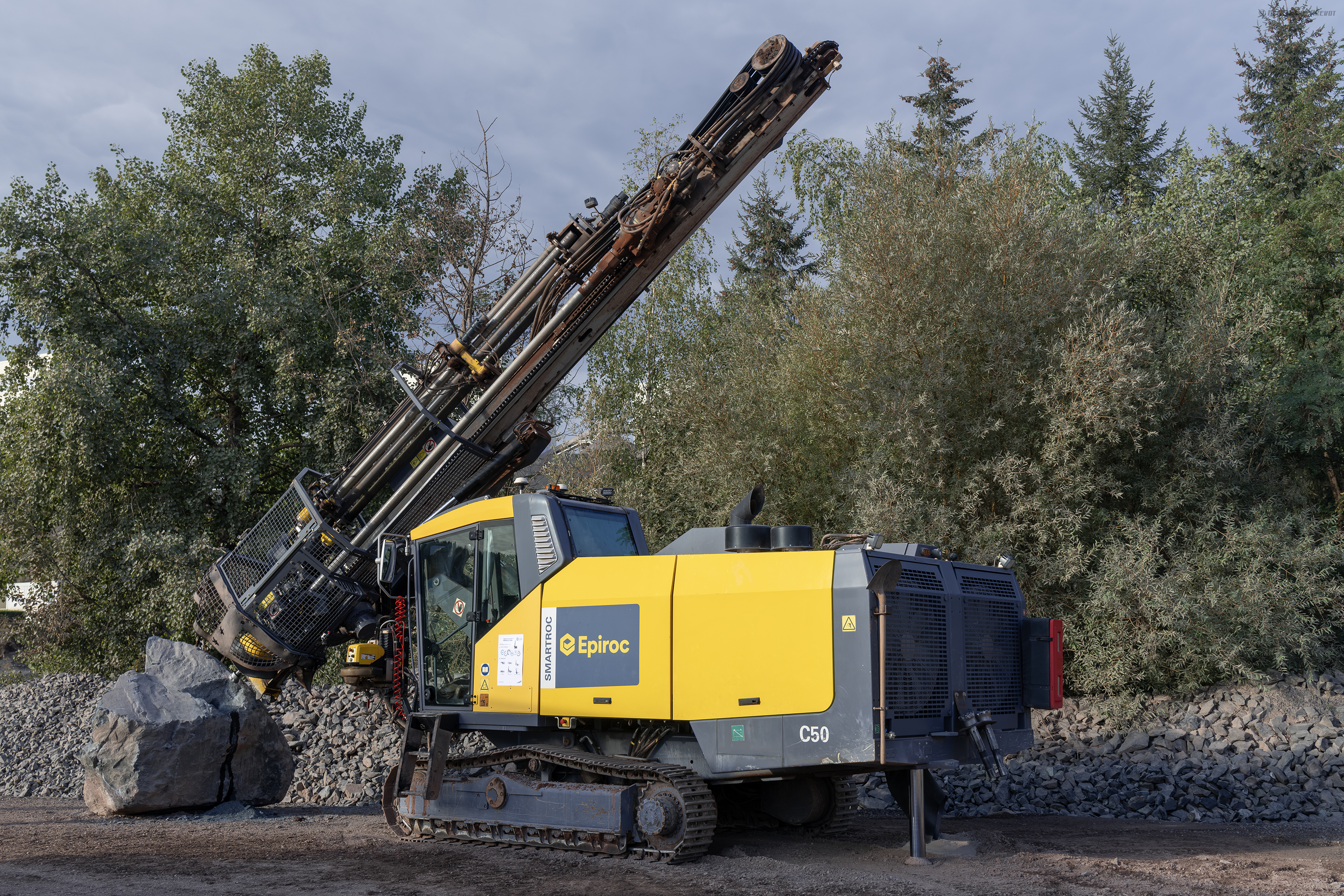
Epiroc SmartROC machine

Epiroc has its roots in Atlas Copco, which was founded in 1873 in Stockholm. It was created as a result of Atlas Copco's decision to split out its legacy business of mining equipment. Atlas Copco began to produce rock drills in 1905. In January 2017, Atlas Copco's board of directors decided to propose to the Annual General Meeting that the company be divided, and that the mining and infrastructure business be listed as its own separate company in 2018. Epiroc was officially created on 1 January 2018 and was subsequently listed on the Nasdaq Stockholm stock exchange on June 18, 2018.

Epiroc operates as 5 divisions focused on their respective application of mining engineering, digital products, and services & service support.

- Surface
- Underground
- Parts & Services
- Digital Solutions
- Tools & Attachments

== Products and services ==
Epiroc offers a product portfolio of drilling rigs, rock drilling tools, trucks & loaders, raise boring equipment, excavator attachments, rock excavation equipment, rock reinforcement tools & underground mine ventilation systems, and service agreements related to equipment maintenance. In 2022 it expanded into the field of hyperspectral imaging of core samples.
