= Black Range State Park =

Protected area in Victoria, Australia

- IUCN category II (national park)
- Location within Victoria
- Location: Victoria
- Nearest city: Cavendish
- Coordinates: 37°09′28″S 142°04′55″E
- Area: 117 km^{2} (45 sq mi)
- Established: 1983
- Governing body: Parks Victoria

Black Range State Park is a state park 340 km (210 mi) northwest of Melbourne, Australia, near the town of Cavendish. It covers an area of 117 square kilometres (29,000 acres). In addition to natural flora and fauna, the park protects Australian Aboriginal art and occupation sites of the Jardwadjali people. The area's steep, rocky terrain meant it was never cleared by pastoralists, and has essentially remained in its natural condition.
