= Mount Buangor State Park =

- IUCN category II (national park)
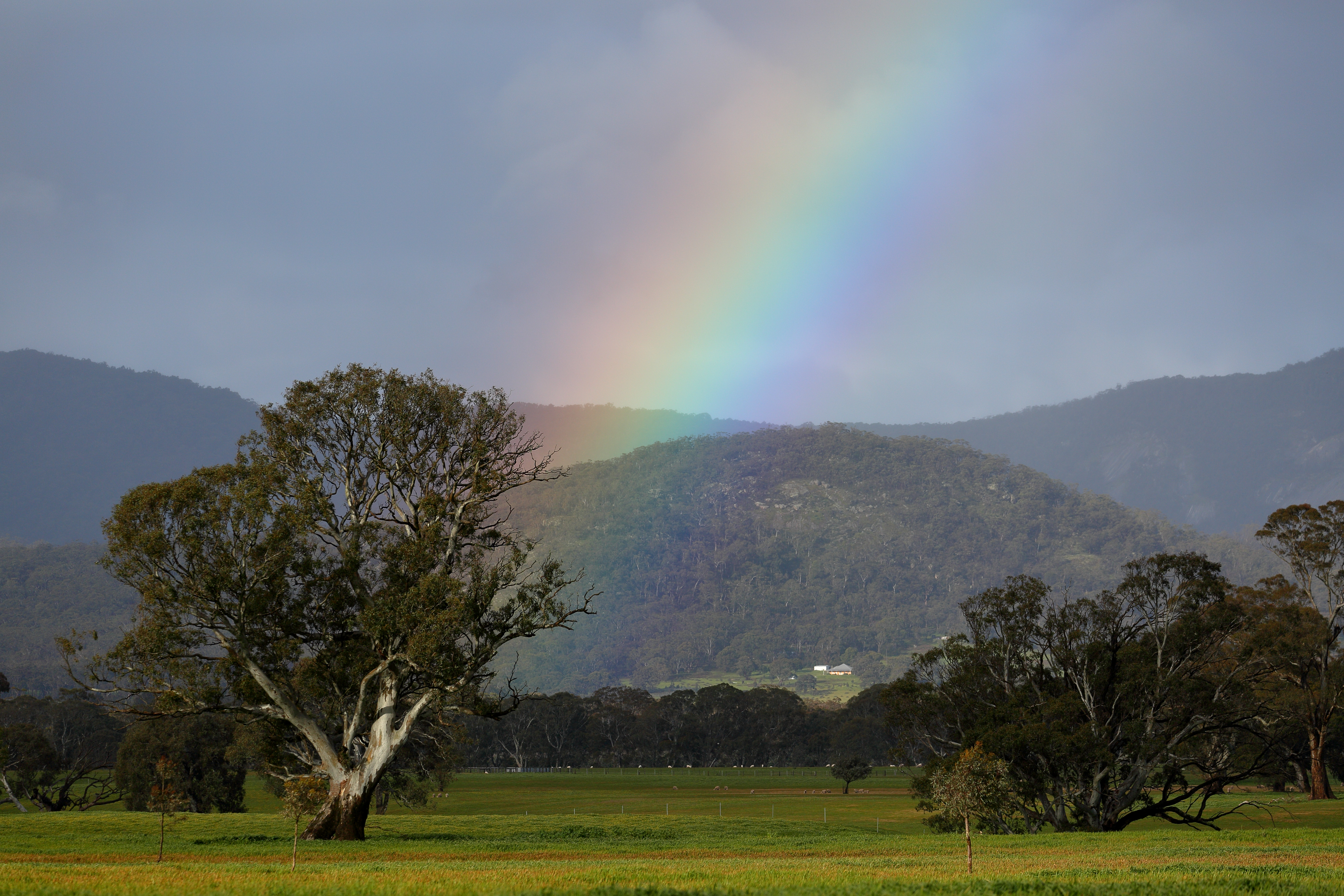
- Mount Buangor State Park, October 2016

- Location within Victoria
- Location: Victoria
- Nearest city: Ararat
- Coordinates: 37.32849°S 143.2226°E
- Area: 24 km^{2} (9.3 sq mi)
- Established: 1989
- Governing body: Parks Victoria
- Website: Official website

Mount Buangor State Park is located 60 kilometres west of Ballarat, Victoria in Bayindeen. The 2400-hectare park takes in varied eucalypt forest, creek flats, a waterfall, steep escarpments, and the area's highest peak, Mount Buangor (987 m.). The park contains a 15 km network of walking trails.

The eucalypt trees include Yarra gums, manna gums, blue gums, messmates, narrow-leaved peppermint gums, snow gums and red stringybarks, as well as large tree ferns. More than 130 species of birds have been recorded in the Mount Cole State Forest, which includes the park. Fauna includes echidnas, eastern grey kangaroos, wallabies, possums, gliders and bats, as well as introduced deer.

The local Aboriginal people were the Beeripmo Balug clan of the Djab Wurrung tribe. Mount Buangor was previously known as Flagstaff Hill and was reported to have been visited by the explorer Thomas Mitchell during the 1830s. There were a number of sawmills in the area in the 19th century.
