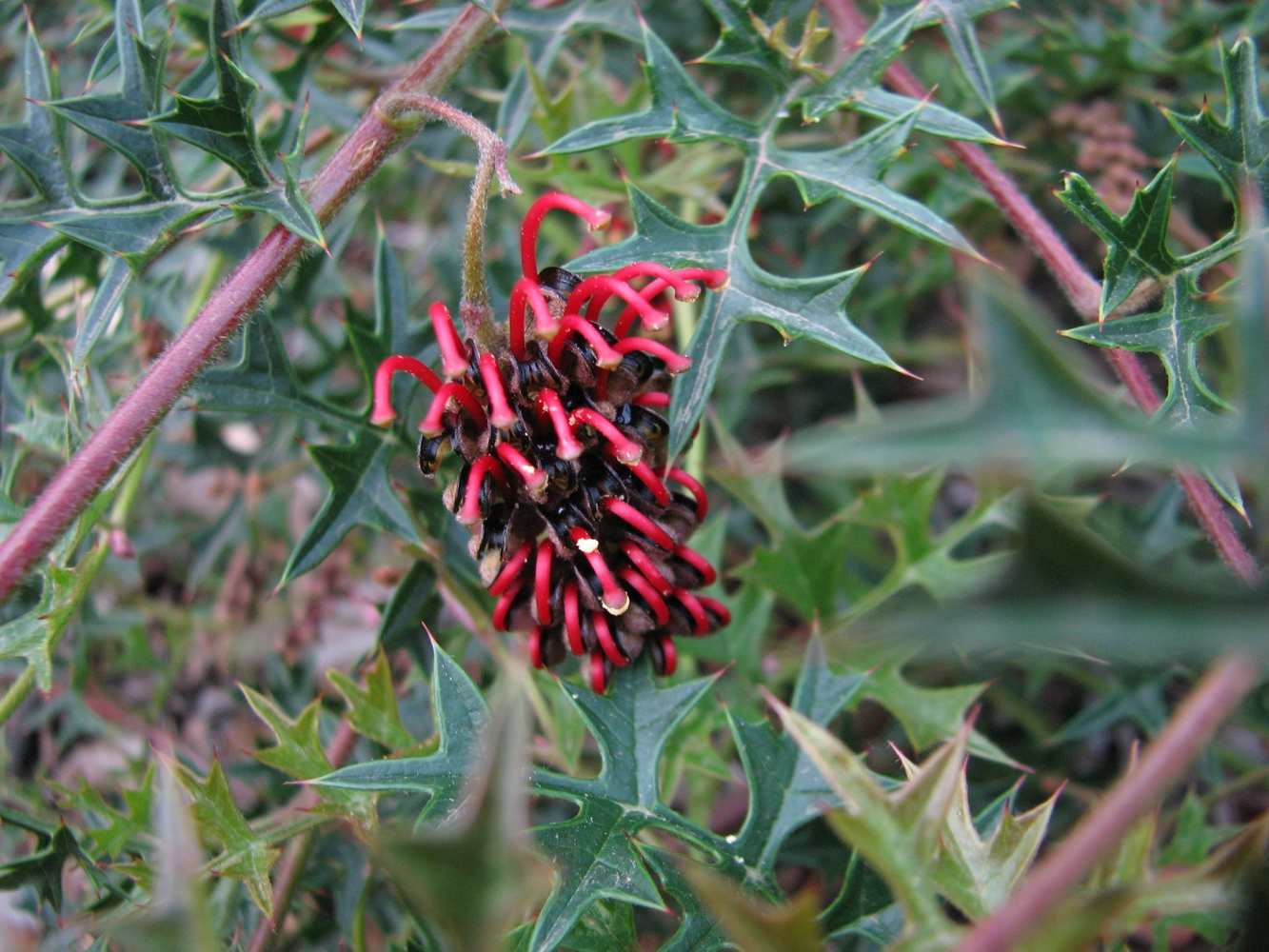
- Subspecies brevistyla in the Royal Botanic Gardens Victoria
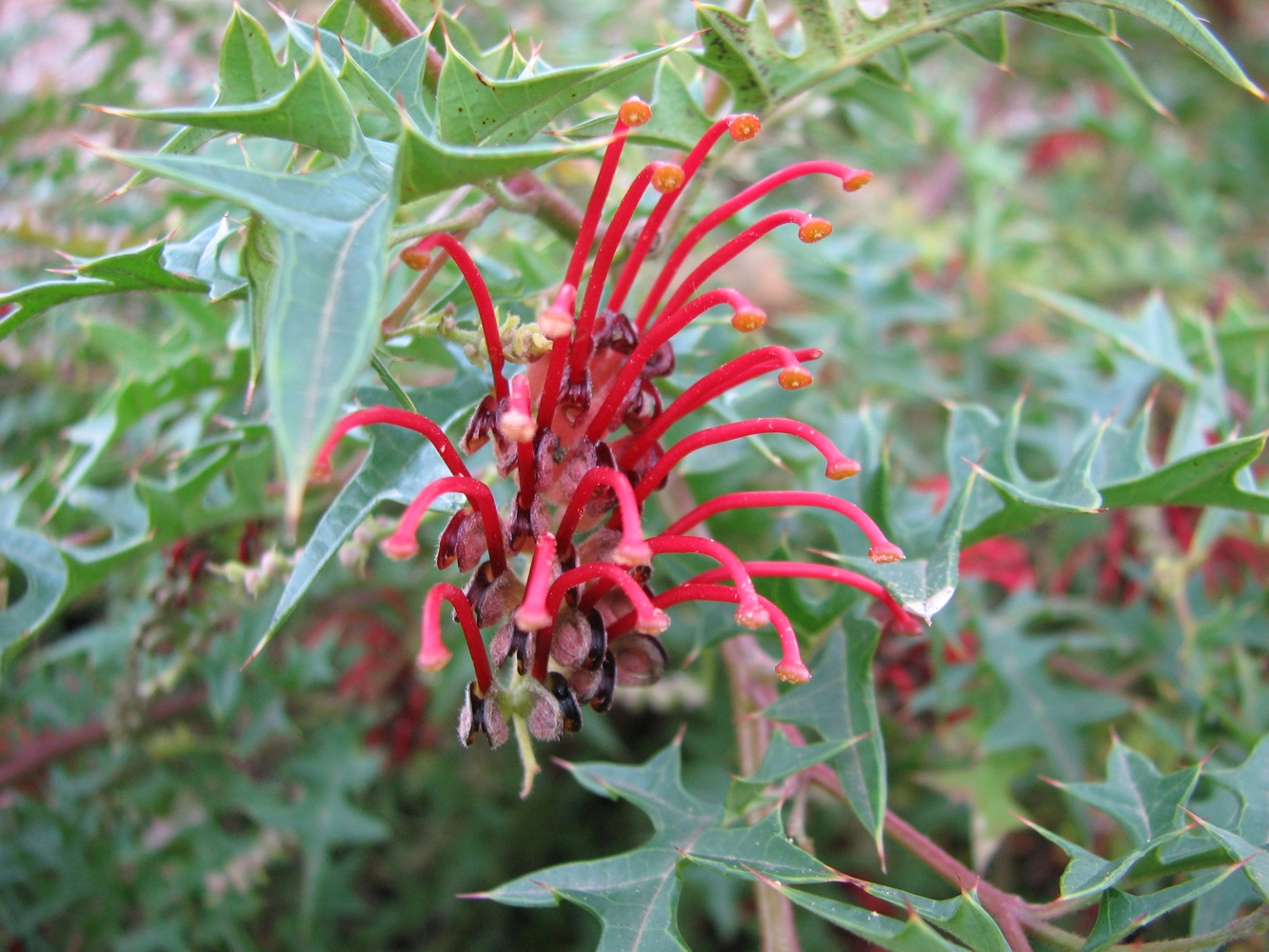
- Subspecies montis-cole in the Royal Botanic Gardens Victoria

Scientific classification
- Kingdom: Plantae
- Clade: Tracheophytes
- Clade: Angiosperms
- Clade: Eudicots
- Order: Proteales
- Family: Proteaceae
- Genus: Grevillea
- Species: G. montis-cole

Binomial name
- Grevillea montis-cole R.V.Sm.

= Grevillea montis-cole =

Species of shrub endemic to Victoria, Australia

Grevillea montis-cole, commonly known as Mount Cole grevillea, is a species of flowering plant in the family Proteaceae and is endemic to central-western Victoria, Australia. It is a shrub with divided leaves with 5 to 15 lobes, the end lobes more or less triangular to narrowly oblong and sharply-pointed, and clusters of greenish to fawn and dull purplish flowers.

== Description ==
Grevillea montis-cole is a straggling to open, semi-erect shrub that typically grows to 0.6–1.5 m (2 ft 0 in – 4 ft 11 in) high and 0.9–3.6 mm (0.035–0.142 in) wide, the branchlets with a few shaggy hairs. The leaves are egg-shaped, 20–70 mm (0.79–2.76 in) long and 25–50 mm (0.98–1.97 in) wide in outline and divided with 5 to 15 spreading lobes that are in turn divided with 2 to 5 lobes, the end lobes narrowly oblong, 2–23 mm (0.079–0.906 in) long, 2–7 mm (0.079–0.276 in) wide and sharply pointed. The edges of the leaves and leaflets are rolled under and the lower surface has a few woolly hairs. The flowers are arranged on one side of a rachis 10–60 mm (0.39–2.36 in) long and are silky- to shaggy-hairy, the pistil 15.5–17.0 mm (0.61–0.67 in) long. The flowers are greenish to fawn on the outsided, dull purplish inside, with a bright red style. Flowering occurs from October to March and the fruit is a woolly- or silky-hairy follicle 9–12 mm (0.35–0.47 in) long.

== Taxonomy ==
Grevillea montis-cole was first formally described in 1983 by Raymond Vaughan Smith in the journal Muelleria from specimens he collected in the Mount Cole State Forest in 1965. In the same journal, Smith described two subspecies and the names are accepted by the Australian Plant Census:

- Grevillea montis-cole R.V.Sm. subsp. brevistyla (commonly known as Langi Ghiran grevillea) is a low spreading shrub growing to 1 m (3 ft 3 in) high and that has pistils that are less than 20 mm (0.79 in) long, and leaves that are shorter and broader than those of the autonym.
- Grevillea montis-cole subsp. montis-cole R.V.Sm. (commonly known as Glut grevillea), is a shrub that grows to a height of between 1.0–1.5 m (3 ft 3 in – 4 ft 11 in) and has pistils longer than 20 mm (0.79 in).

Evidence from preliminary genetic data combined with morphological and habitat differences indicates that Grevillea montis-cole subsp. brevistyla may require recognition as a distinct species.

== Distribution and habitat ==
Subspecies brevistyla occurs on the upper slopes of Mount Langi Ghiran at an altitude of 800–900 m (2,600–3,000 ft) among granitic outcrops. Other plant species found in close proximity include bundy (Eucalyptus goniocalyx), shiny tea-tree (Leptospermum turbinatum), wedge-leaf hop-bush (Dodonaea viscosa subsp. cuneata), hairy correa (Correa aemula), violet kunzea (Kunzea parvifolia) and cranberry heath (Astroloma humifusum).

Subspecies montis-cole occurs in Mount Cole State Forest. It grows as an understorey shrub in tall eucalypt forest on soil derived from decomposed granite at an altitude of about 500–900 m (1,600–3,000 ft).

== Conservation status ==
Subspecies brevistyla is listed as vulnerable under the Australian Government Environment Protection and Biodiversity Conservation Act 1999, threatened in Victoria under the Flora and Fauna Guarantee Act 1988, and as vulnerable in Victoria on the Department of Sustainability and Environment's Advisory List of Rare Or Threatened Plants In Victoria.

Subspecies montis-cola is listed as rare in Victoria on the Victorian Department of Sustainability and Environment's Advisory List of Rare Or Threatened Plants In Victoria.
