= Fiery Creek =

Fiery Creek may refer to:

- Fiery Creek (Victoria), a watercourse in the Australian state of Victoria, Australia.
  - Streatham, Victoria is a town on the lower reaches of the creek known as Fiery Creek until 1854
  - Raglan, Victoria the town nearest the area of the 1850s Fiery Creek gold rush
- Fiery Creek (Queensland), watercourse(s) in the Australian state of Queensland
- Fiery Creek (New Zealand), a watercourse in the Otago region of New Zealand
