= Ararat, Victoria =

City in Australia

Ararat
- City
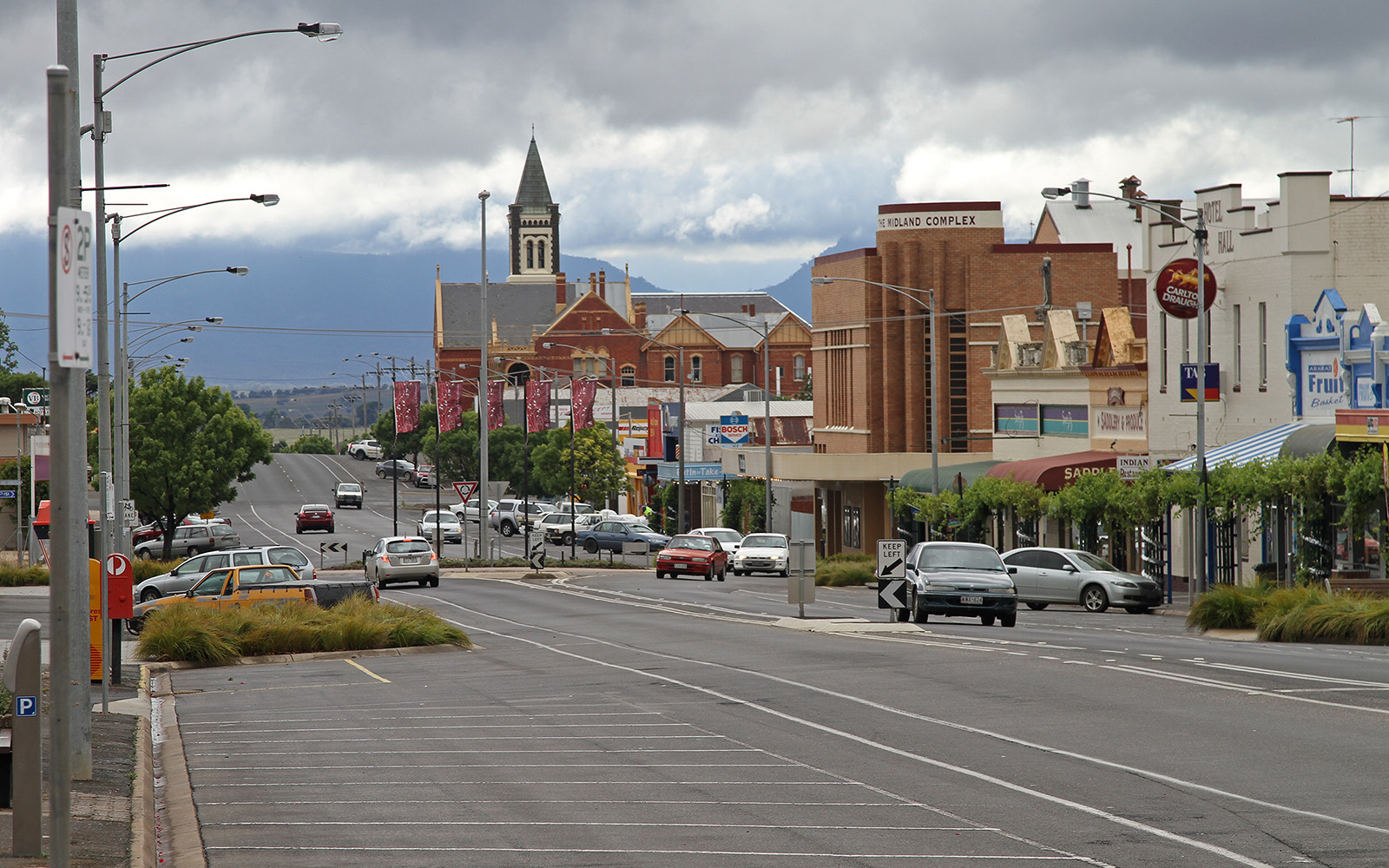
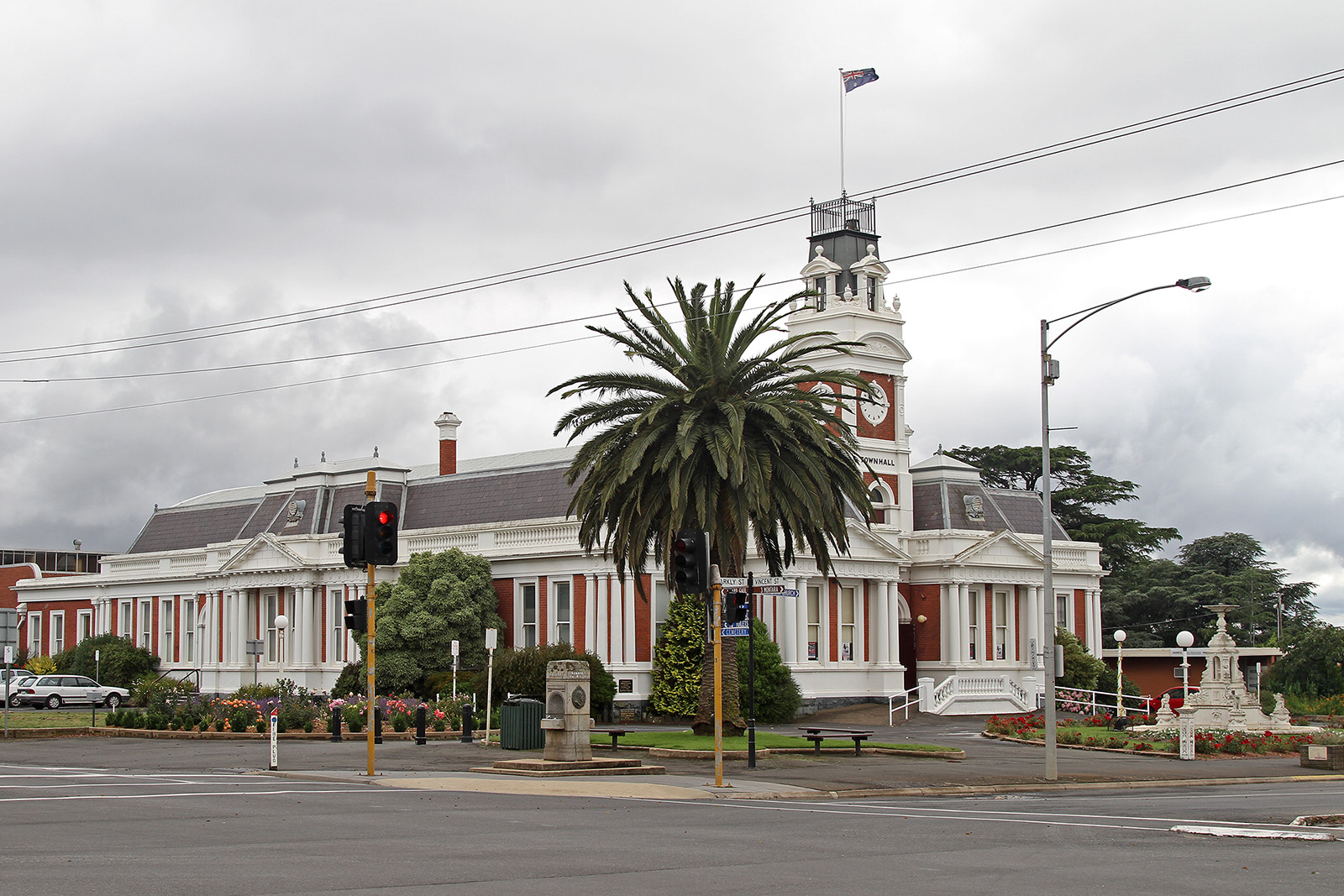
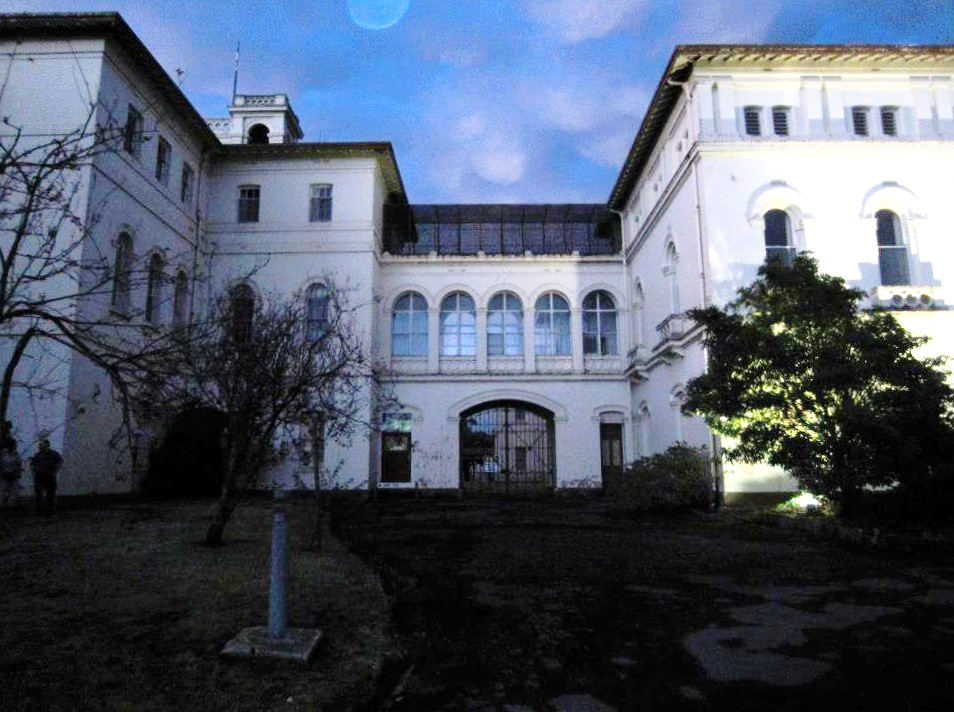
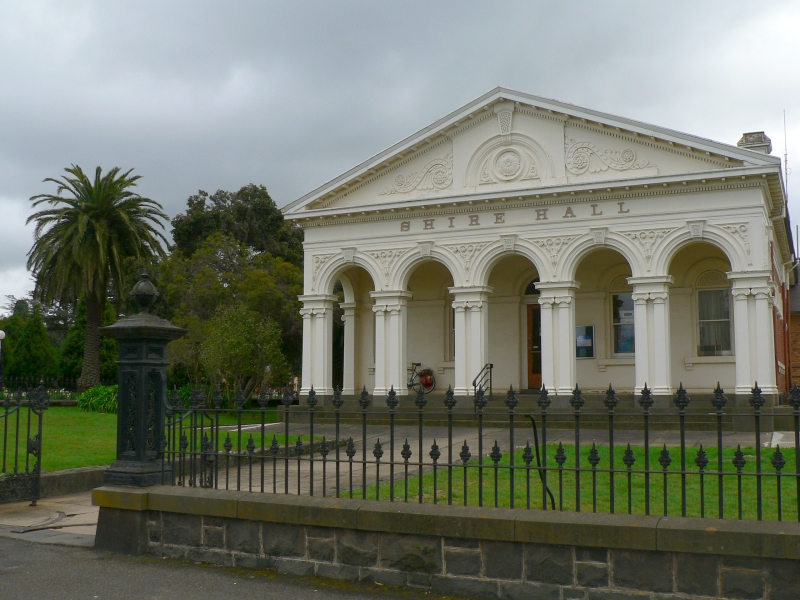
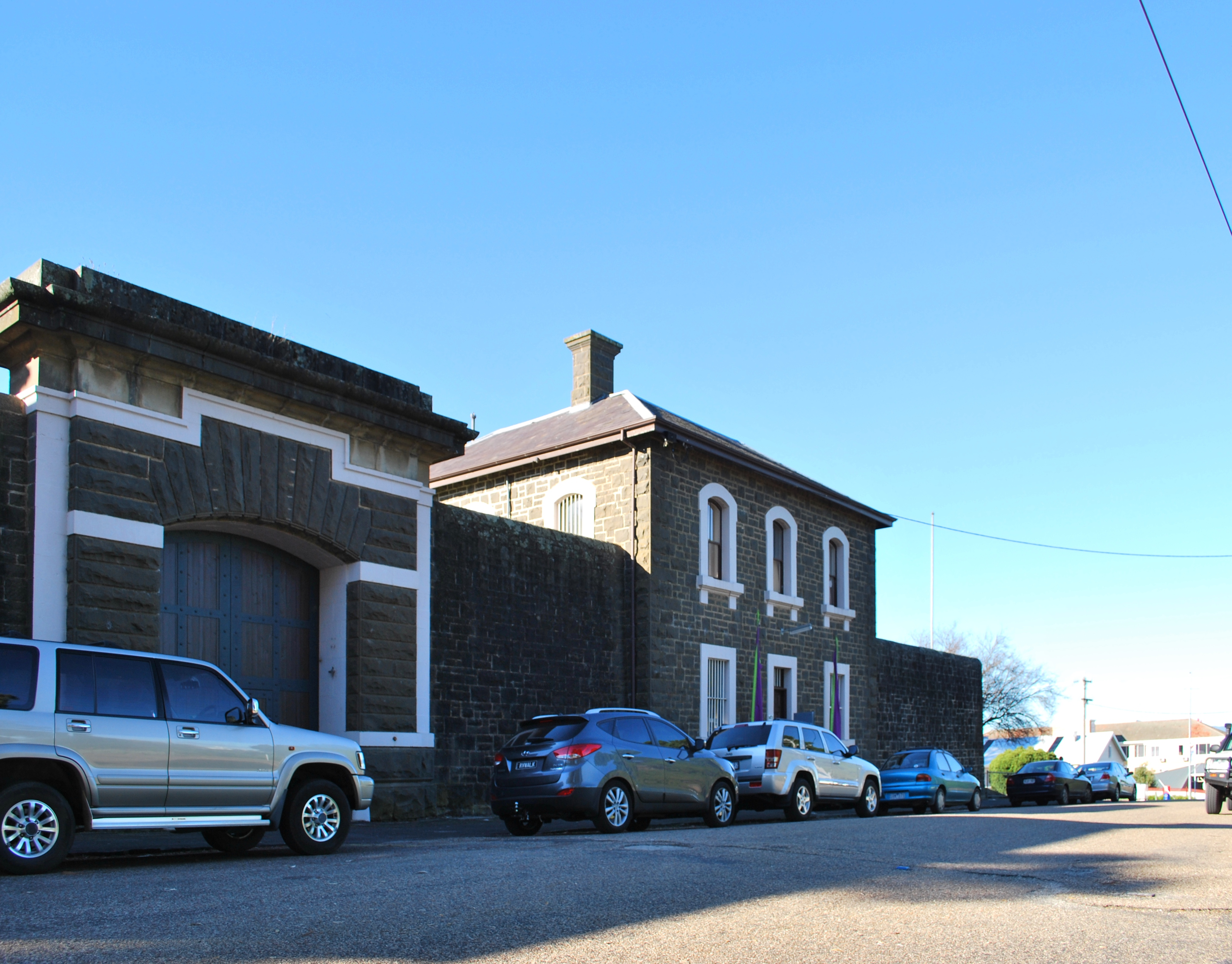
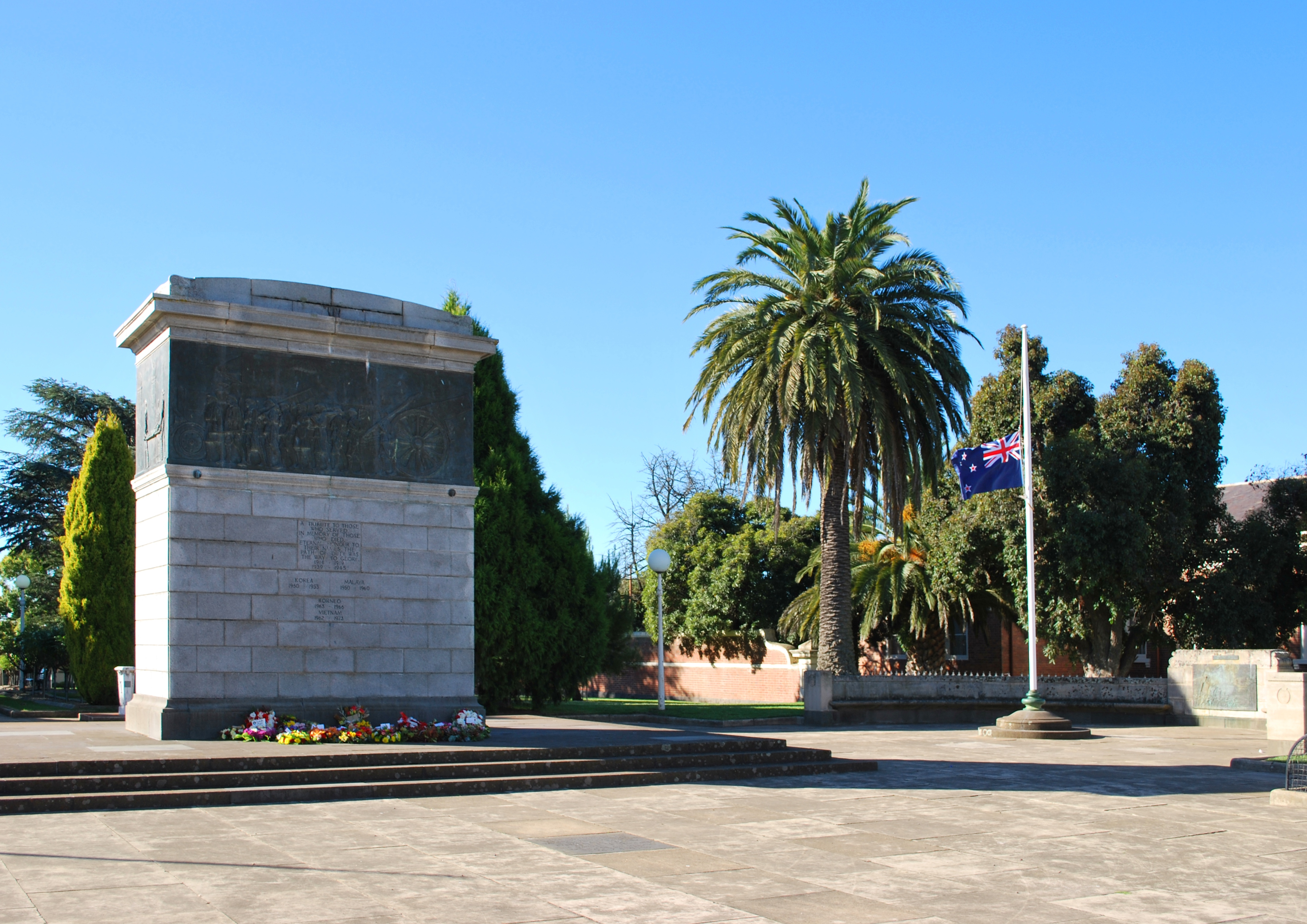
- Barkly Street, looking east towards Mt Langi Ghiran Town Hall Aradale Lunatic Asylum Shire Hall J Ward War Memorial and Cenotaph Gum San Chinese Heritage Museum Barkly Street, looking east towards Mt Langi Ghiran

- Coordinates: 37°17′0″S 142°55′0″E
- Country: Australia
- State: Victoria
- LGA: Rural City of Ararat
- Location: 198 km (123 mi) from Melbourne; 105 km (65 mi) from Horsham; 92 km (57 mi) from Ballarat; 125 km (78 mi) from Hamilton; 138 km (86 mi) from Warrnambool
- Established: 1857

Government
  - State electorate: Ripon
  - Federal division: Wannon

Area
  - Total: 13.6 km^{2} (5.3 sq mi)
- Elevation: 295 m (968 ft)

Population
  - Total: 8,500 (2021 census)
  - Density: 625/km^{2} (1,619/sq mi)
- Postcode: 3377
- Mean max temp: 19.2 °C (66.6 °F)
- Mean min temp: 7.1 °C (44.8 °F)
- Annual rainfall: 587.0 mm (23.11 in)

Ararat (Djabwurrung: Tallarambooroo) is a town in the Central Highlands region in Victoria, Australia, about 198 kilometres (120 mi) west of Melbourne, on the Western Highway on the eastern slopes of the Ararat Hills and Cemetery Creek valley between Victoria's Western District and the Wimmera. The source of the Hopkins River is a few kilometres to the east below Telegraph Hill.

Its urban population according to 2021 census is 8,500 and services the region of 11,880 residents across the Rural City's boundaries. It is also the home of the 2018/19 GMGA Golf Championship Final.

It is the largest settlement in the Rural City of Ararat local government area and is the administrative centre.

The discovery of gold in 1857 during the Victorian gold rush transformed it into a boomtown which continued to prosper until the turn of the 20th century, after which it has steadily declined in population. It was proclaimed as a city on 24 May 1950. After a decline in population over the 1980s and 90s, there has been a small but steady increase in the population, and it is the site of many existing and future, large infrastructure projects, including the Hopkins Correctional Facility development project.

It is named after Mount Ararat 10 kilometres south-west of the town which was named by politician/pastoralist Horatio Wills in 1841.

Ararat is the only city in Australia founded by Chinese people.

== History ==
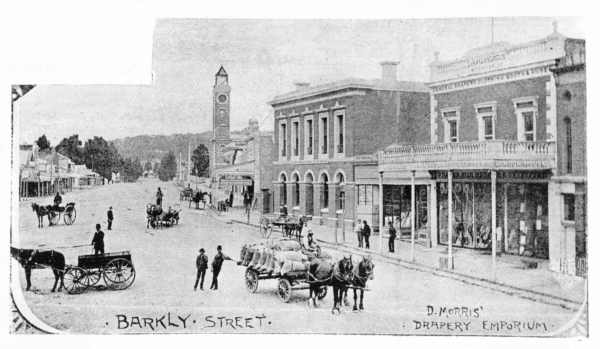
Upper Barkly Street in 1894. The fire brigade tower (since demolished) is the tall building in the distance, E.S. & A Bank and drapery business is on the right

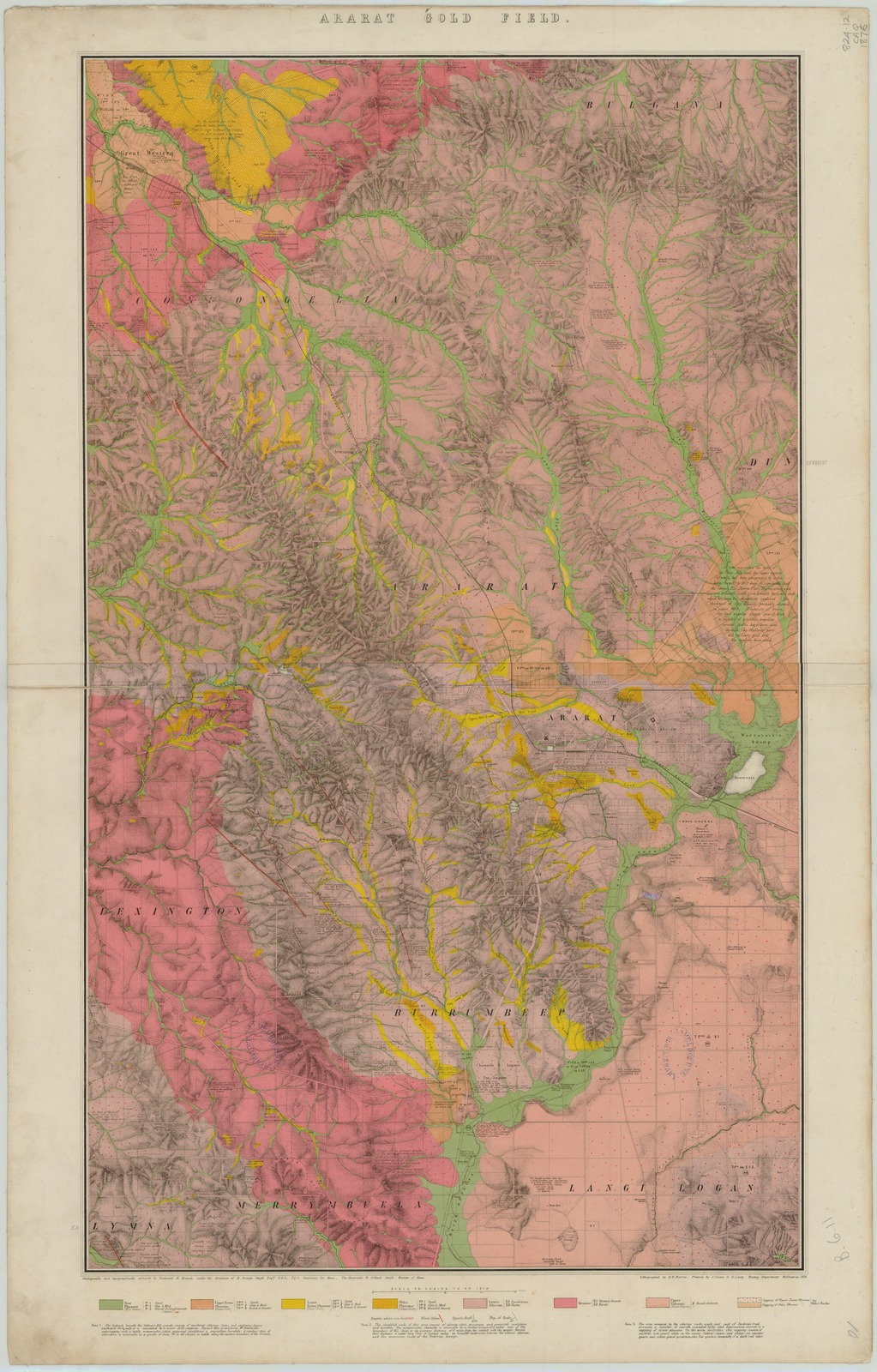
1875 geological and topographical survey of the Ararat gold field by F Krausé

Prior to the European settlement of Australia, Ararat was inhabited by the Djab wurrung group of Aboriginal Australian people. The area encompassing Ararat has many Djabwurrung language placenames; 'Karangajaruk' refers to 'the valley in which Cathcart and the Ararat (gold) diggings lie', 'Warrayatkin' refers to Green Hill Lake, 'Butingitch' refers to the Ararat town site, 'Gorambeep barak' refers to Mount Ararat, and 'Pandort' refers to a large waterhole to the south.

Europeans first settled in the Grampians region in the 1840s after surveyor Thomas Mitchell passed through the area in 1836. In 1841, Horatio Wills, on his way to selecting country further south, wrote in his diary, "like the Ark we rested" and named a nearby hill Mt Ararat. It is from this entry and the nearby Mount that the town takes its name.

When gold was first discovered most activity was west of the current town. The first Post Office opened in Cathcart on 1 February 1856 before being transferred to the current town on 31 August 1857. One month later the Gold Warden relocated to the current town. The current town was known for a time as Canton Lead. A tender was issued by the Public Works Office in 1858 for a cookhouse for the Police at Canton Lead. Until 1859 the local courts were the Canton Lead Court of Petty Sessions.

=== Gold in & around Ararat ===
Alluvial gold was first discovered in the Ararat area in May 1854 at Pinky Point on the Denicull Creek. (A memorial can be found on the corner of the Ararat - Halls Gap Road (C222) and Better Route Road 5 km west of Ararat. Pinky Point is to the north.) By June that year 30 claims were being worked by 200 men across what was first called the Mt William field.

Other leads were quickly discovered in nearby creeks including Spring Gully. This discovery led to the establishment of the town of Cathcart (near where Spring Lead Road meets the C222). Gold was also discovered in Armstrong towards Great Western.

The alluvial rush peaked in 1857 when gold was discovered at Cambell's Diggings (Moyston) and in the Canton led by a party of Chinese miners en route to the Central Victorian gold fields. The Canton lead swung around the west side of the current town centre from the Gum San Chinese Heritage Centre along the current alignment of Banfield Street between View Point and Laby Streets. The Gum San Chinese Heritage Centre commemorates the history of the substantial Chinese community in Ararat.

By 1864, most of the 1,500 miners were reworking the known leads with puddling machines, sluices and Long Toms. Returns were diminishing and the 1865–1866 drought brought this phase of full-time gold mining to an end.

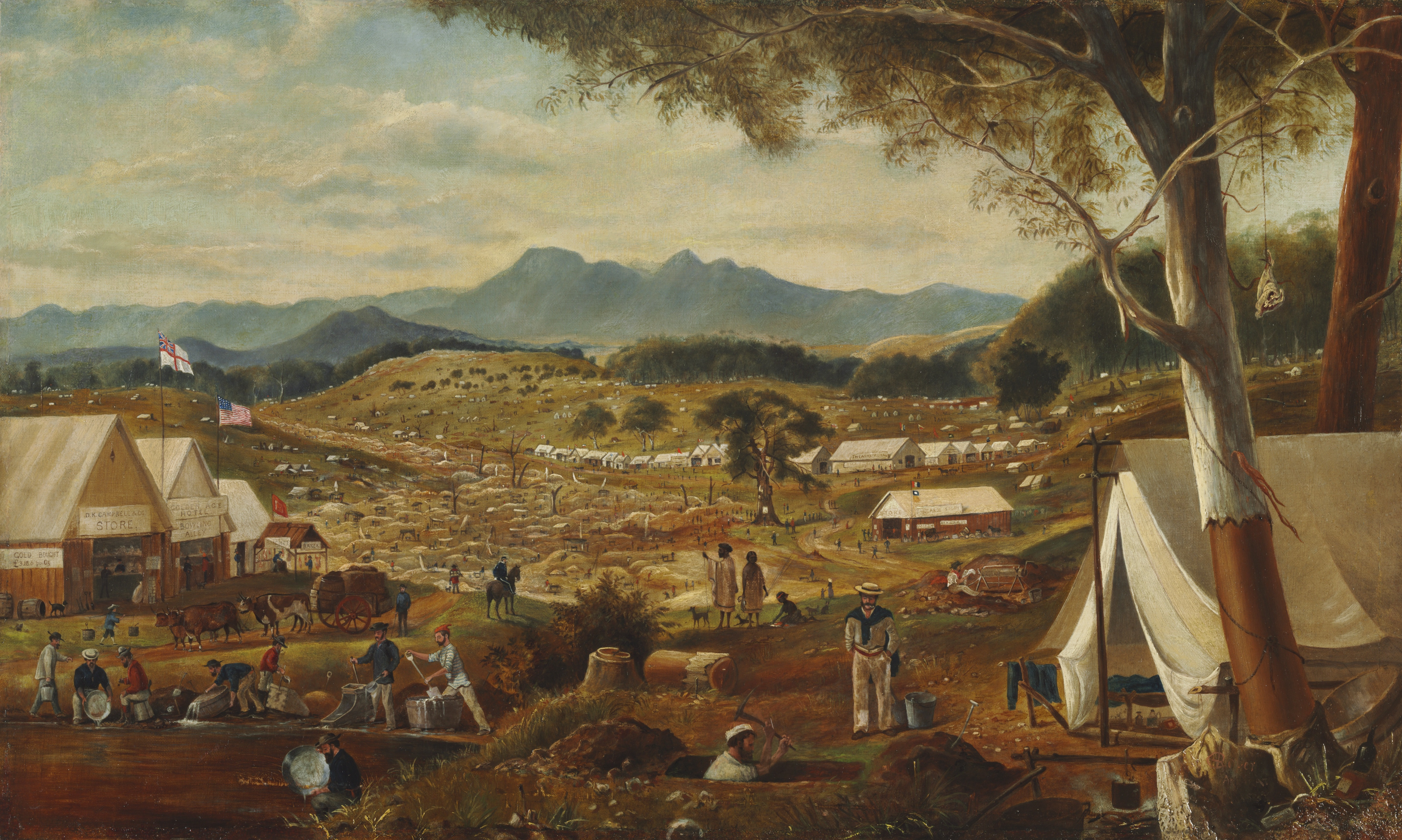
Edward Roper, Gold diggings, Ararat, ca. 1854–58, oil on canvas, State Library of New South Wales

Between 1866 and the early 1870s there were investments in deep lead mining. None were profitable and all closed. Investment in quartz mining and crushing was more successful. Inspired by the success of the Campbell's Reef operation other companies including in 1867 the Noah's Ark Company in Ararat that operated a 24 horsepower steam engine and 8 stamping heads. By 1870 the only profitable quartz mine was on the Rhymney Reef.

In 1870 investment flowed into hydraulic sluicing. By building reservoirs and carefully contouring the aqueducts or channels these companies could wash out the gold bearing soil on the higher ground which the alluvial miners had not been able to reach. The Norval Dam on the Rhymney Road and the half kilometre of sluice constructed in 1875 enabled sluicing of Curtis Hill and Opossum Gully.

Attention in the 1880s turned back to deep lead mining including on the Black Lead. This lead ran from Albert Street and McGibbony Street east to the rail line and the Hopkins River. In 1881 the Grand Junction Company began to pump groundwater from a depth of 50m. By 1883, they were pumping 13Ml a day which enabled them to begin to extract gold from the Black Lead. Unable to make a profit, the mine closed in 1885.

Similar difficulties were faced by all deep lead speculators including well after the turn of the century. The only company to have longer-term success was the Cathcart Proprietary Company (Denicull Creek) which switched to electric power, and in 1905 employed 100 men. The Company achieved 'sensational yields' in 1909. This success stimulated the formation of at least ten other deep lead companies. Three, including the Cathcart Company, proved profitable. But by 1925 all had closed. A final effort at deep lead mining in 1932 failed before achieving production, ending what might be called the professional gold era in Ararat.

The area still attracts enthusiasts who report finding valuable nuggets. 'Ararat's main goldfields have produced a great deal of gold to detector operators and will continue to do so for many years.'

The rapid growth generated by gold brought about a municipality, which was incorporated as a borough on 24 September 1858.

In the aftermath of the goldrush, Ararat soon became known for its asylum. The Aradale Mental Hospital opened in 1865 with the former the Ararat County Gaol converted in 1887 to J Ward, a psychiatric facility for the criminally insane. The Hospital remained open as a treatment facility until 1997 and has since become the site for paranormal and haunted house tours.

Vines were planted in 1863 by Swiss settlers, the Pola family.

== Traditional ownership claims ==
The formally recognised traditional owners for the area in which Ararat sits, north-west of Campbell Street and the Pyrenees Highway and north-east of the Western Highway and Lambert Street are the Wotjobaluk, Jardwadjali (also known as Jaadwa), Wergaia and Jupagalk nations. These nations are represented by the Barengi Gadjin Land Council Aboriginal Corporation.

The formally recognised traditional owners for the area in which Ararat sits, south-east of Campbell Street and the Pyrenees Highway are the Djab Wurrung people. The Djab Wurrung people are represented by Martang Pty Ltd.

In the area of Ararat that is south-west of the Western Highway and Lambert Street, traditional owners have not yet been formally recognised. However, the Eastern Maar people are negotiating a recognition and settlement agreement with the Victorian Government. The boundary of the agreement is under negotiation. The Eastern Maar people are represented by the Eastern Maar Aboriginal Corporation (EMAC).

== Economy ==
Ararat's economy is driven by primary industries of the region including wool, beef and the Grampians Wine Region. The region has a number of wind farms including the 240 MW Ararat Wind Farm and the 52 MW Challicum Hills Wind Farm which produce large amounts of renewable energy to the National Electricity Market, and a 250MVA synchronous condenser is being built to stabilize the grid. It is also home to AF Gason Pty Ltd one of Australia's largest manufacturers of farm machinery and wood heating.

The city also has a significant service economy with health, community services and is a regional commerce centre. Hopkins Correctional Centre, formerly known as H.M. Prison Ararat, is located on the town's eastern outskirts.

Servicing visitors to the Grampians National Park and the local wine industry, tourism is a relatively small but significant industry in Ararat, employing 150 people and generating around $8 million to the economy, however its impact on the surrounding region is significant with tourists spending $270 million annually. Key tourist attractions include the Ararat Regional Art Gallery, Mount Langi Ghiran winery, tours through Aradale (Australia's largest abandoned 1800s lunatic asylum) and the Gum San Chinese Heritage Centre.

== Geography ==
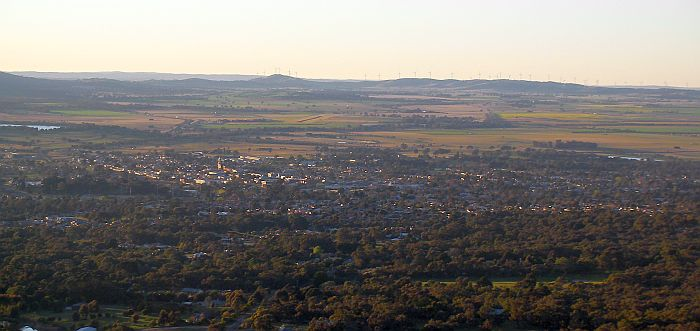
Ararat from One Tree Hill lookout looking south west toward the Challicum Hills Wind Farm

Ararat is nestled between several mountain ranges, including the Grampians National Park, Mount Langi Ghiran, Mount Cole, Mount Buangor, Ararat Hills Regional Park and the Pyrenees Ranges. Cemetery Creek, the valley's main catchment runs through the north of the town while Green Hill lake is on the city's eastern fringe.

=== Climate ===
Ararat has an oceanic climate (Köppen Cfb) verging close to a temperate Mediterranean climate (Köppen Csb), with warm summers that are frequently interrupted by cold fronts; and cool, usually rainy, winters.

Climate data for Ararat Prison, elev. 295 m (968 ft), (1991–2020, extremes 1969–present)
Month	Jan	Feb	Mar	Apr	May	Jun	Jul	Aug	Sep	Oct	Nov	Dec	Year
Record high °C (°F)	43.1 (109.6)	44.7 (112.5)	39.0 (102.2)	33.5 (92.3)	26.2 (79.2)	20.4 (68.7)	21.0 (69.8)	24.5 (76.1)	28.9 (84.0)	34.7 (94.5)	39.8 (103.6)	43.3 (109.9)	44.7 (112.5)
Mean daily maximum °C (°F)	27.8 (82.0)	27.3 (81.1)	24.4 (75.9)	20.0 (68.0)	15.7 (60.3)	12.8 (55.0)	12.1 (53.8)	13.3 (55.9)	15.7 (60.3)	19.0 (66.2)	22.3 (72.1)	25.4 (77.7)	19.7 (67.5)
Mean daily minimum °C (°F)	11.6 (52.9)	11.6 (52.9)	9.7 (49.5)	7.1 (44.8)	5.3 (41.5)	4.0 (39.2)	3.4 (38.1)	3.7 (38.7)	5.1 (41.2)	6.1 (43.0)	7.9 (46.2)	9.7 (49.5)	7.1 (44.8)
Record low °C (°F)	0.6 (33.1)	0.3 (32.5)	−0.9 (30.4)	−5.7 (21.7)	−5.2 (22.6)	−6.4 (20.5)	−7.3 (18.9)	−6.2 (20.8)	−4.0 (24.8)	−4.5 (23.9)	−4.5 (23.9)	−1.0 (30.2)	−7.3 (18.9)
Average rainfall mm (inches)	37.5 (1.48)	29.4 (1.16)	23.6 (0.93)	37.0 (1.46)	48.6 (1.91)	59.9 (2.36)	57.8 (2.28)	66.8 (2.63)	58.2 (2.29)	44.7 (1.76)	44.6 (1.76)	40.4 (1.59)	548.6 (21.60)
Average rainy days (≥ 0.2 mm)	6.8	5.8	7.8	9.6	13.5	16.7	17.5	17.3	14.4	11.9	9.9	8.3	139.5
Average afternoon relative humidity (%)	36	38	41	48	61	70	69	63	59	51	46	39	52
Source: Australian Bureau of Meteorology

== Demographics ==
As of the 2021 census, Ararat City has a population of 7,015 with 1831 families total. The Ararat Local Government Area has a population of 11,880 with 2,973 families total.

88% of people in Ararat were born in Australia.

62% of people in Ararat identify as Christian. Anglican and Catholic faiths are evenly represented with 18% of people identifying with each.

== Governance ==
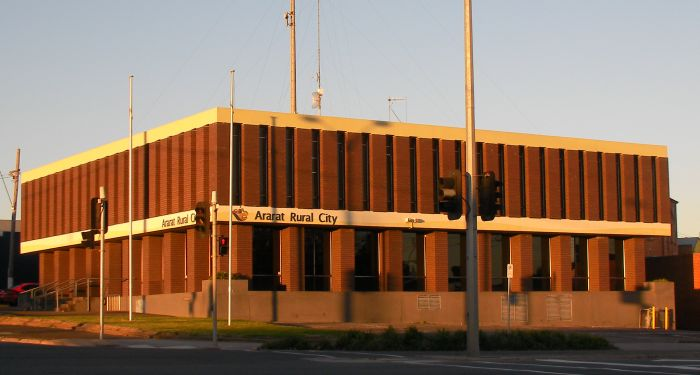
Rural City of Ararat offices

The city is the location of the municipal offices and seat of government for the Rural City of Ararat local government area. Ararat is represented by the federal Division of Wannon.

For law enforcement, Ararat has a single police station as well as a magistrates court and a children's court all located on Barkly Street.

== Education ==
Ararat has four primary schools – Ararat Primary (colloquially known as "Ararat 800" by locals); Ararat West Primary; Ararat North Primary and St Mary's Catholic Primary School. In addition there are several kindergartens in the city. There are two main secondary colleges, Ararat College and Marian College, the latter of which is a Catholic secondary school. Ararat has regional campuses of the Federation University Australia (formerly the University of Ballarat) and Melbourne Polytechnic (formerly the Northern Melbourne Institute of TAFE).

== Culture ==
=== Art ===
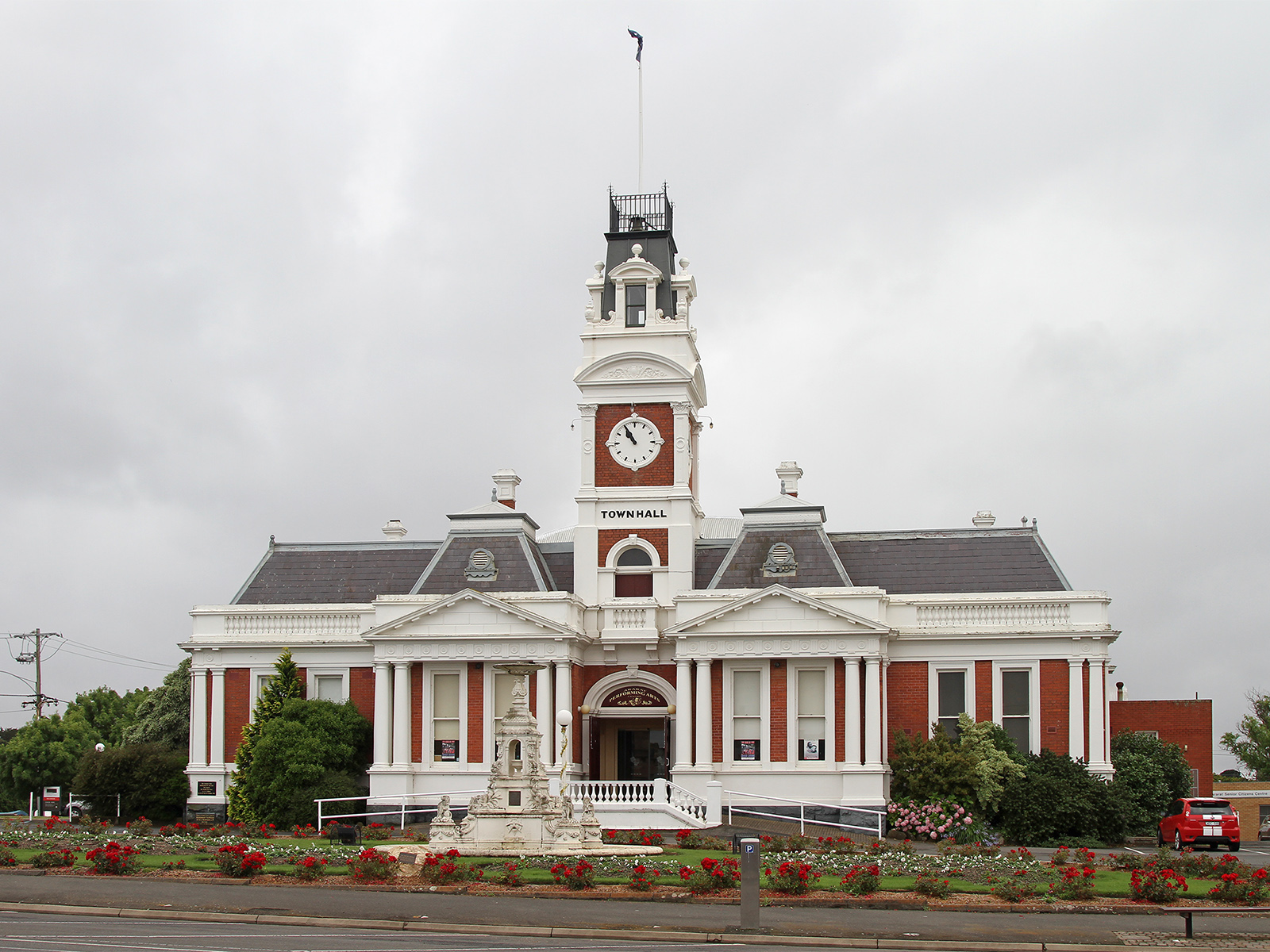
Former Ararat Town Hall, now the Ararat Regional Art Gallery and Ararat Performing Arts Centre

Ararat's National Trust listed former town hall with its elaborate clock tower, designed by Molloy and Smith and built in 1899, is now home to the Ararat Regional Art Gallery, and the Ararat Performing Arts Centre for the city.

=== Sport ===
Australian rules football is a popular sport in Ararat. The Ararat Football Club (formed in 1871) was a founding club of the Wimmera Football League and continues to compete with its most recent premiership in 2023. A second club, the Ararat Eagles Football Club was formed more recently in 2000 to play in the Lexton Plains Football League, but now play in the Mininera & District Football League. Like many country football clubs, Ararat's clubs offer netball as a popular sport for women in Ararat, with the Ararat Rats representing the city in the Wimmera Netball Association.

The horse racing club, the Wimmera Racing Club, schedules around five race meetings a year at Ararat including the Ararat Cup meeting in November.

Ararat Harness Racing Club conducts regular meetings at its racetrack in the town.

Golfers play at the Aradale Golf Club on Grano Street or at the course of the Chalambar Golf Club on Golf Links Road.

Motocross has become a popular sport in the area, and the Ararat Motorcycle Club regularly holds events up to state level.

Ararat is also home to the Grampians Soaring Club, a recreational gliding club that supports "Yes Girls Glide" and has a successful juniors program.

Association football is played at junior level, with the Ararat and Grampians YMCA school competition from years 8–12.

=== Festivals ===
The city's main community festival is known as the Golden Gateway Festival and has run since 1958 when it was set up to commemorate the city's centenary.

The Jailhouse Rock Festival (since 1994 a retro 1950s themed festival) is the other major festival event in Ararat.

=== In popular culture ===
Two Royal Australian Navy ships have been named after this town. HMAS Ararat (K34), a Bathurst-class corvette, and HMAS Ararat (ACPB 89), an Armidale-class patrol boat.

In 2014 Ararat residents appeared in the Channel 10 hit show The Biggest Loser.

Ararat was the setting for the 2008 film Lake Mungo.

=== Attractions ===
Popular tourist destinations include the Gum San Chinese Heritage Centre, Aradale Lunatic Asylum Tours, Langi Morgala Museum, The Astor Cinema, and J Ward. Guests can attend a day time history tour of J Ward or be incarcerated for an evening on the J Ward Ghost Tour.

=== Gold era buildings ===
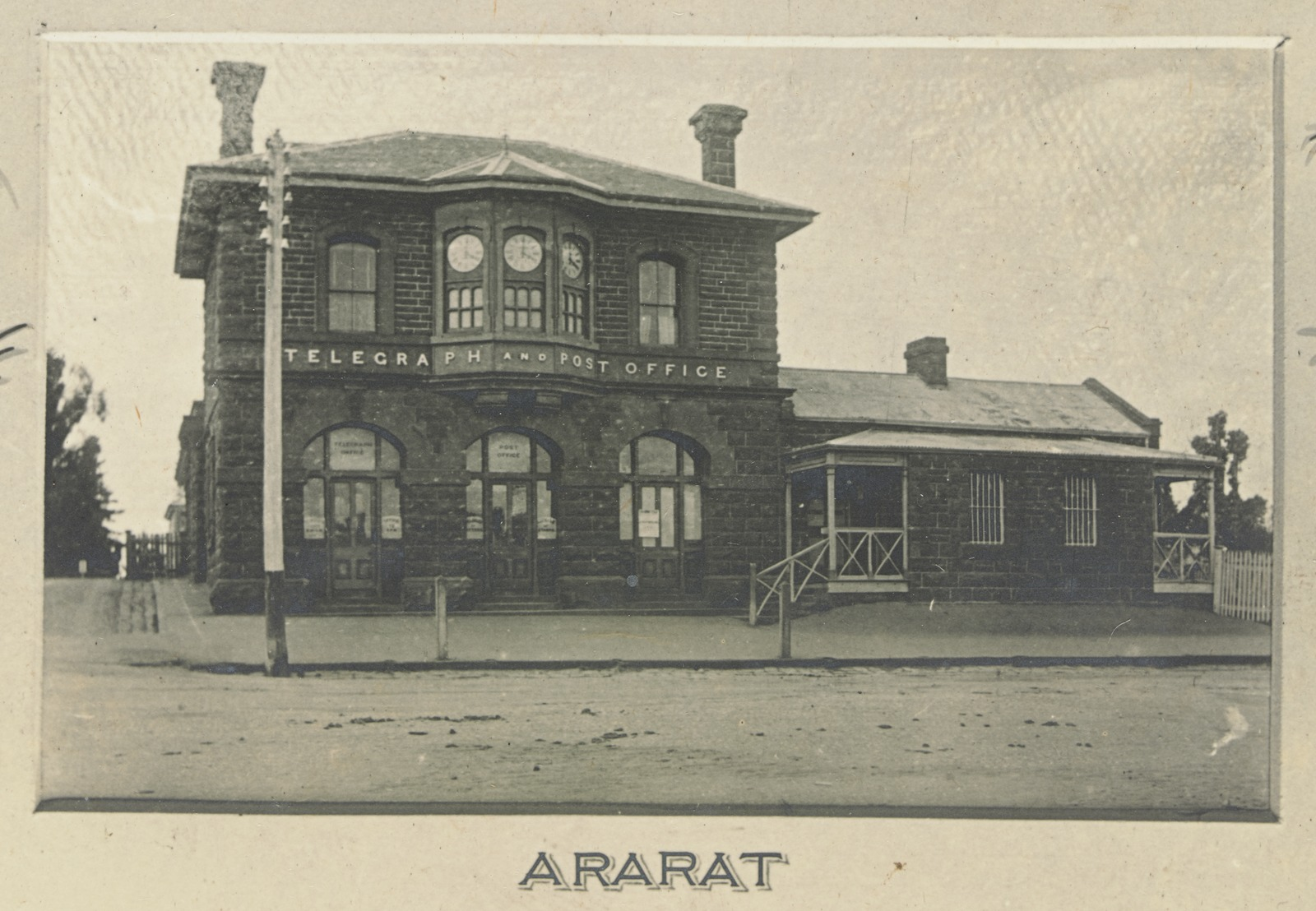
1890s postcard of Ararat Telegraph & Post Office and the old Sub-Treasury & Assay Office (right)

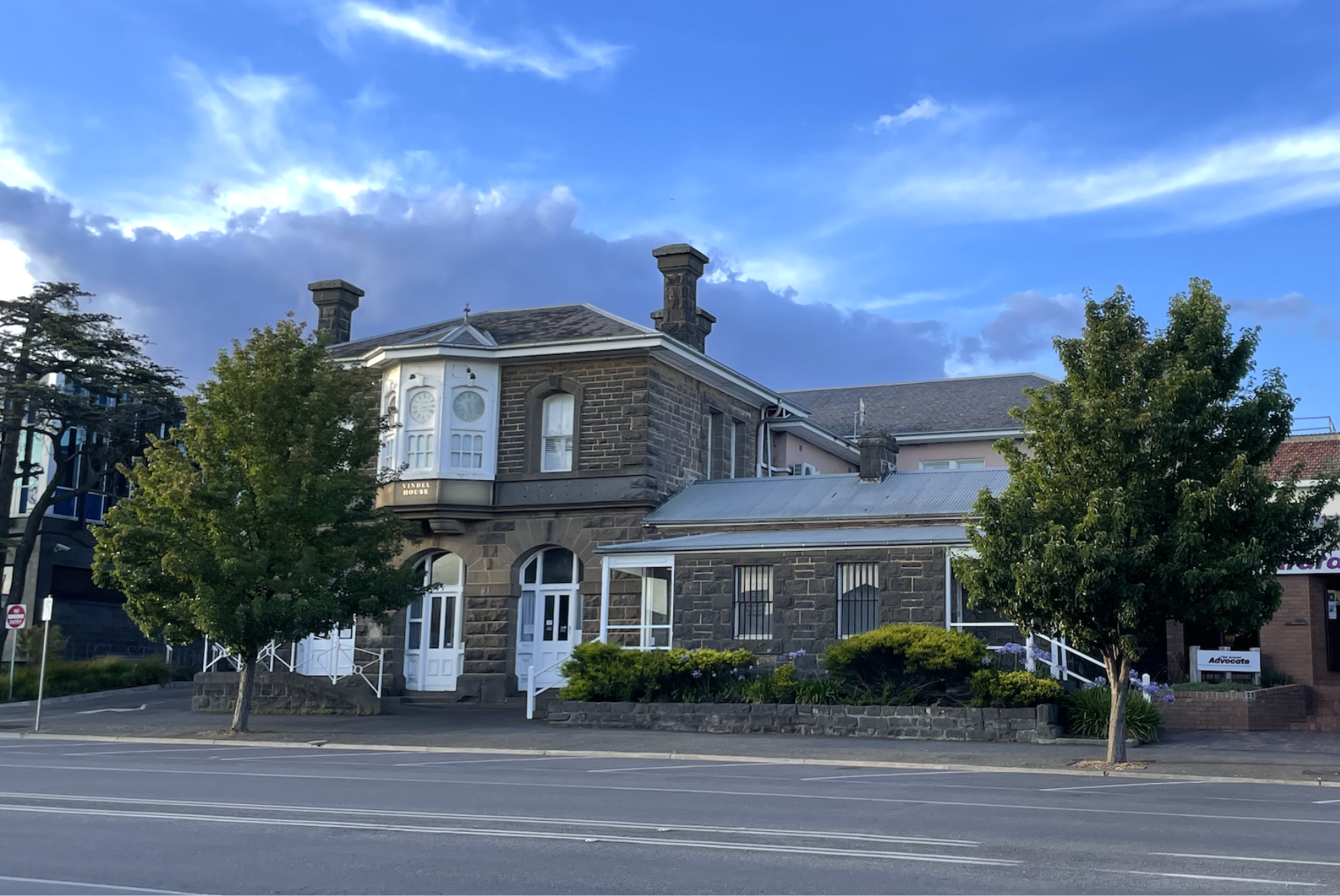
Left: Telegraph & Post Office (1861) Right: Sub-Treasury & Assay Office (1858), Barkly Street Ararat

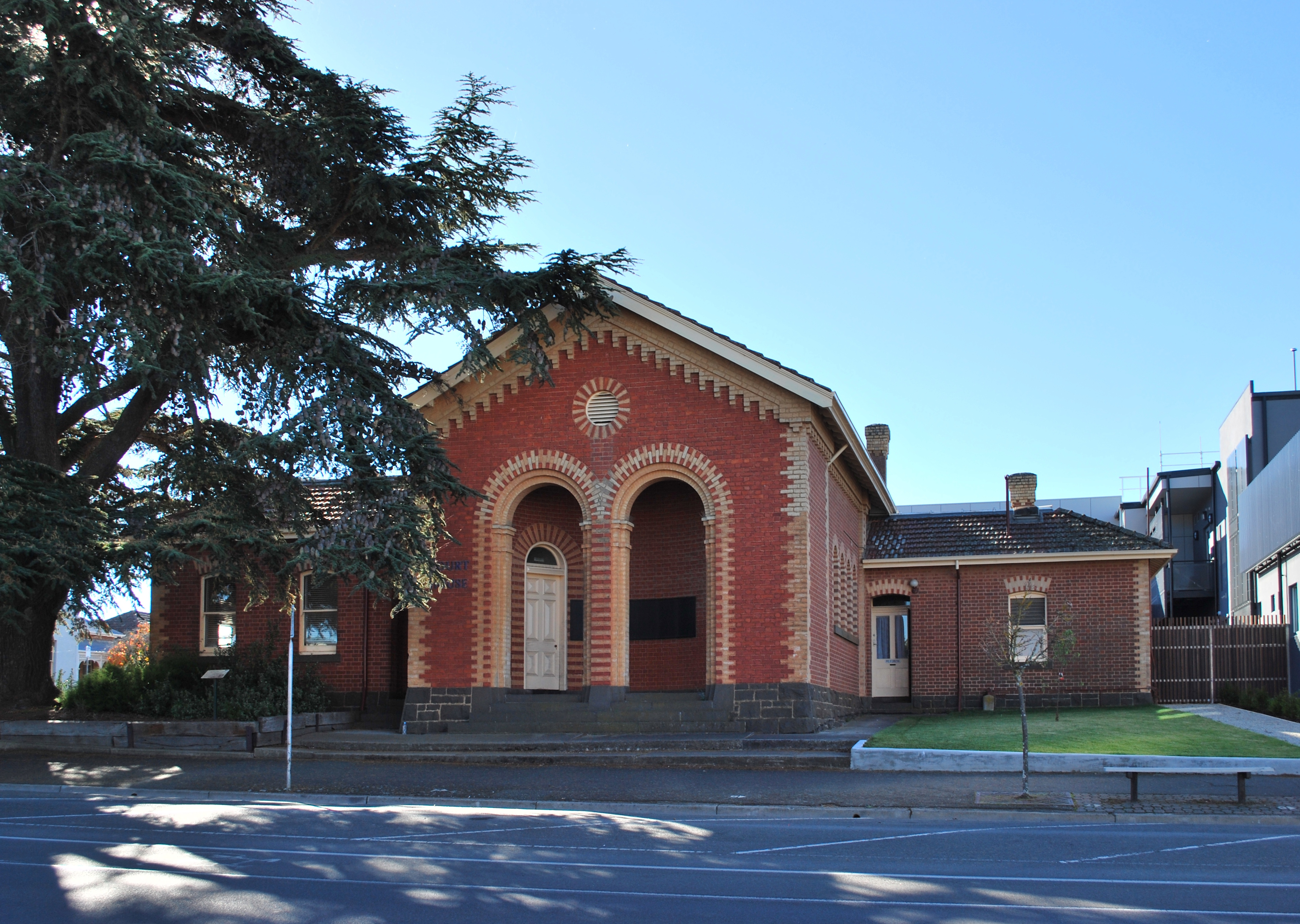
Ararat Court House 1866-1867

Several buildings survive from the first decade of the Ararat gold rush including the bluestone Sub-Treasury & Assay Office, the neighbouring Telegraph & Post Office and the brick Court House on Barkly Street. All sit on the Police Camp block, which was bounded by Barkly, Ligar, High and Ingor Streets.

==== Sub-Treasury & Assay Office 1858 ====
Sub-Treasuries were established at major gold fields from the late 1850s onwards by the Victorian Government to receive and hold the gold recovered from the diggings. There were Sub-Treasuries at Ballarat, Castlemaine, Beechworth, Sandhurst [Bendigo], Maryborough and Ararat. Several survive. The Sub-Treasury building in Beechworth (1856) which was repurposed in the 1880s as the Police Station is one. The main (Old) Treasury Building in Melbourne was completed in 1862.

The Ararat Sub-Treasury & Assay Office (1858) was the sixth to be opened. The value of the gold received by the Ararat Sub-Treasury in that year was £29,820 7sh 2d with a value in the 2020s in the order of $15m.

(The Victoria Heritage Database records the 1993 relocation to Ballarat of the wooden flat-pack building (1857) used by the Ararat Gold Warden and originally located in Campbell Street, Ararat.)

==== Telegraph & Post Office 1861 ====
The Telegraph & Post Office (1861), is one of the oldest surviving Post Office buildings in Victoria.

It was the first Victorian Post Office to be designed in the Italianate style with, for example, an arched arcade or loggia (since filled in). Under the influence of William Wardle, who had been appointed Inspector-General and Chief Architect at the beginning of 1861, many more Victorian Post Offices were constructed in this style including for example the Post Office in Stawell. The Ararat building is unusual among Post Offices in that the bluestone wall has not been rendered.

In 1861 the mail to Melbourne closed at 07:00 and the inbound Melbourne mail was scheduled for 14:30.

Following completion of the building, the Telegraph Office moved in. The town had been linked by telegraph since 1858 when the line was extended from Ballarat via a Post Office that was variously called Raglan, Fiery Creek, or Beaufort. The telegraph went live on Thursday 11 November 1858. Reporting the first communication on the line, a journalist wrote 'Now through the click click, of the small mysterious brass apparatus we find ourselves within a minute of Melbourne'.

1876, the Post Office incorporated the Sub-Treasury Building.

In April 1888 the Mayor asked the Postmaster General to provide the building with a clock, which was added in 1889.

==== Court House 1866–1867 ====
In the 1850s the jurisdiction of the Ararat Courts expanded rapidly. In 1857 the Court of Petty Sessions, County Court and Gold Fields Local Court District all sat in Ararat. In 1859 was added the Court of Mines and a General Sessions District that could consider criminal cases. These Courts sat in a bluestone building on the corner of High and Vincent Streets that is now the site of the municipal offices. By the time the current building was completed the Ararat Courts had been included in the Supreme Court Circuit. Today the Courthouse is used for Magistrates' and Children's Court sittings.

The distinctive building with its two-colour brickwork is in the Free Classical style as are other court houses of the time including the old Court House in Beaufort.

== Infrastructure ==
=== Transport ===
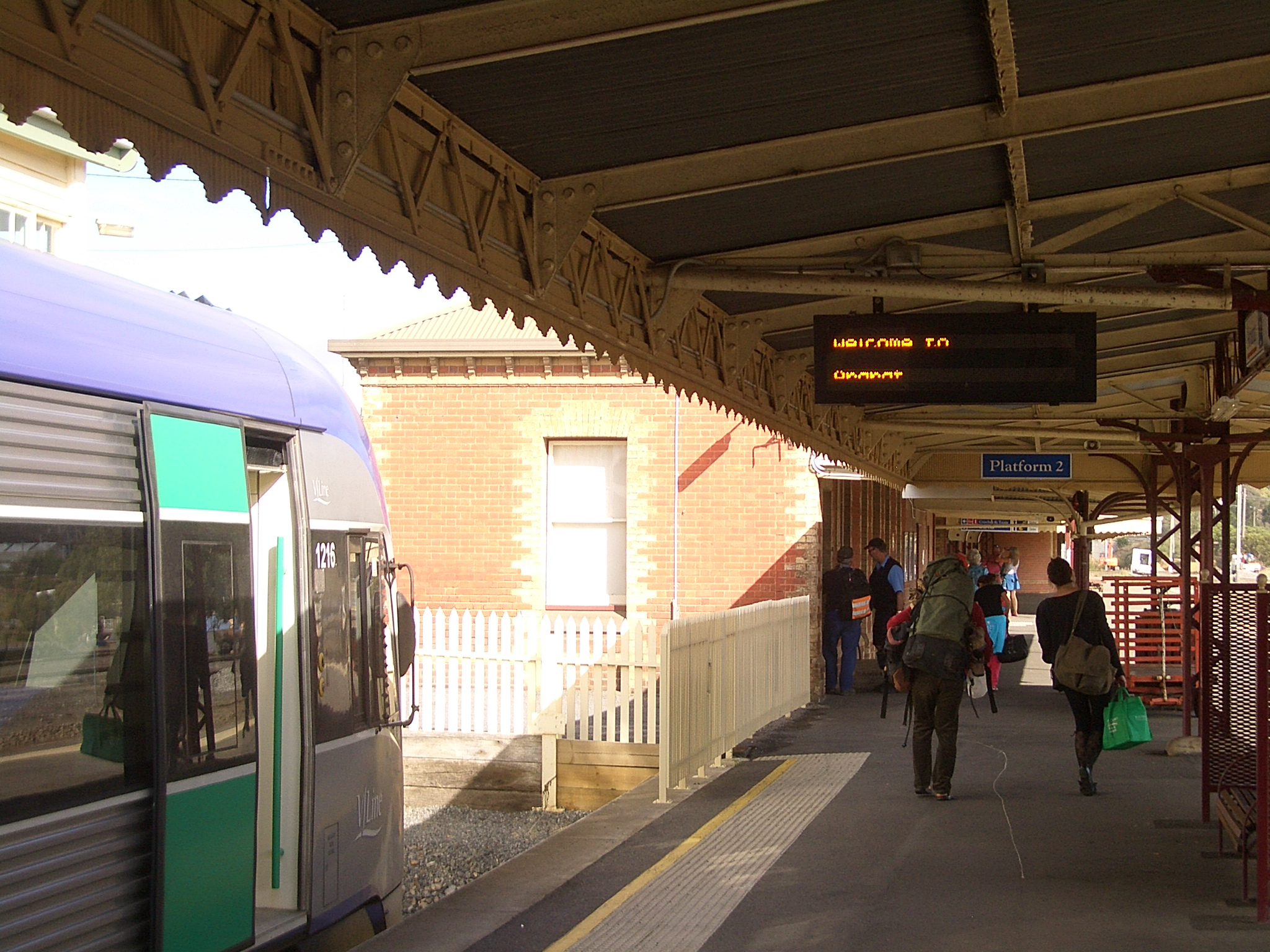
A VLocity train terminating at Ararat railway station

The main form of transport is road transport and motor vehicles. According to the 2006 Census, 88% of people traveled to work by motor vehicle, the vast majority of which traveled by automobile. Ararat is situated at the junction of several main roads including the Western Highway via High Street (running eastward to Ballarat and Melbourne and westward to Horsham and Adelaide); the Pyrenees Highway via Vincent Street (running east to Avoca and Maryborough); Ararat-Pomonal Road via Barkly Street (westward towards Halls Gap) and the Mortlake-Ararat Road via Vincent Street (running south with connections to the west and Hamilton, south and Warrnambool and to the east and Geelong). Ararat's urban area streets are laid out in grid plan. Roads are also important for public transport. Ararat Transit provides 120 bus services on three routes 6 days a week, connecting with train services. According to the 2006 Census, just 4 persons in Ararat traveled to work by bus. Taxi services are provided by Ararat Cabs (since November 2010), provides 6 normal taxi-cabs and 1 wheel-chair bus, capable of 2 wheelchairs or 10 standard passengers.

Rail transport includes both passenger rail and freight rail. The city's only station is Ararat's railway station which is on the Ararat railway line and is the terminal train station for the Ararat V/Line rail service. Twice daily peak VLocity services run to Ballarat (53 minutes) and on to Melbourne (133–143 minutes), with some trains stopping at stations in between. The rail station is at the junction of the Ararat line, the Western standard gauge railway and Avoca railway. The Overland runs to Melbourne twice weekly (140 minutes) and travel to Adelaide is also possible (8 hours).

A regional airport, Ararat Airport YARA (ARY) is located 5 km south of the city on the Western Highway and provides for general aviation.

=== Health ===
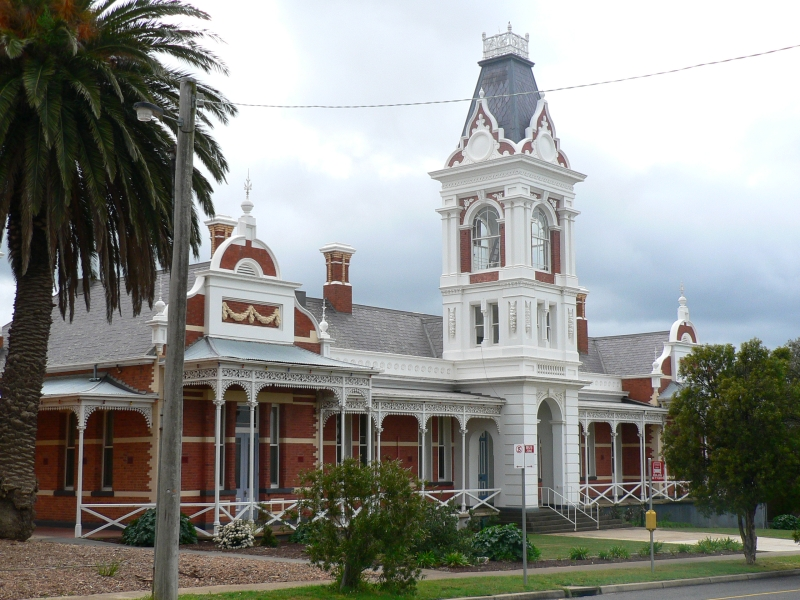
Former Ararat Hospital (1885–86)

Ararat & District Hospital (established in 1850) is a major regional hospital and is coordinated by the East Grampians Health Service and Ararat Medical Centre.

=== Utilities ===
Water and waste-water services are supplied by Grampians-Wimmera-Mallee Water (GWMWater). Ararat's water supply source is a combination of Mt Cole Reservoir and Lake Fyans, with the smaller Langi Ghiran (Picnic Road) Reservoir also part of the water supply system. Olivers Gully and Copes Hill reservoirs provide additional water storage.

== Notable people ==
- Rob Borbidge – politician, 35th Premier of Queensland
- Shane Kelly – Olympic cyclist and silver and bronze medallist
- Rene Kink – Australian Rules footballer
- Neil Murray – Ararat-born, Lake Bolac-raised singer-songwriter
- Air Chief Marshal Sir Frederick Scherger – born in Ararat on 18 May 1904
- James Scobie (1860–1940) – jockey and racehorse trainer, was born in or near Ararat
- Geoff Todd – artist
- Barry Traynor – a former politician and police officer
- Ella Wood – Australian Women's Rules footballer
- Soul Wun – Electronic musician

== See also ==
- Australian gold rushes
