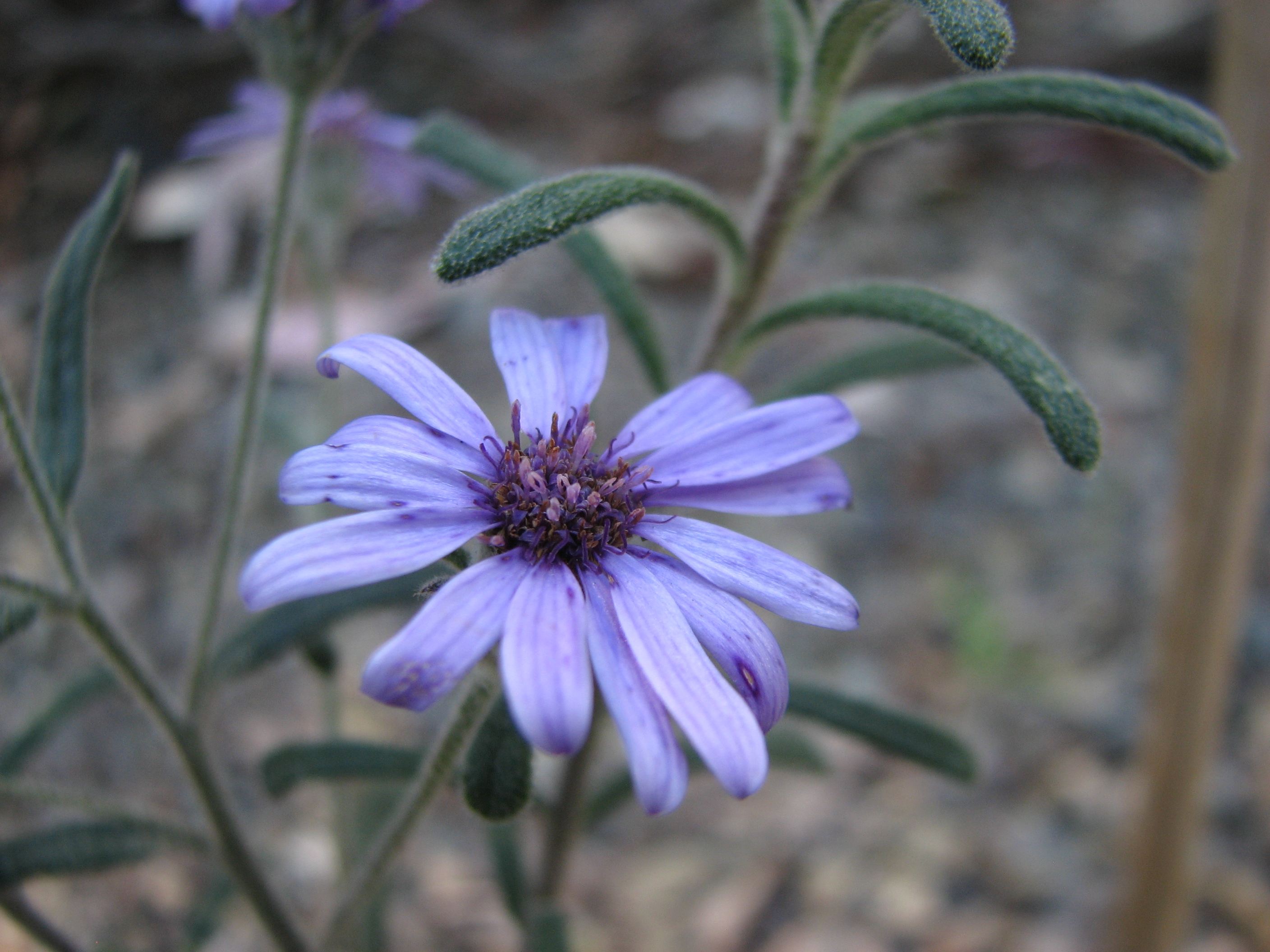
- Olearia asterotricha in Maranoa Gardens

Scientific classification
- Kingdom: Plantae
- Clade: Tracheophytes
- Clade: Angiosperms
- Clade: Eudicots
- Clade: Asterids
- Order: Asterales
- Family: Asteraceae
- Genus: Olearia
- Species: O. asterotricha

Binomial name
- Olearia asterotricha (F.Muell.) Benth.

Synonyms
- Aster asterotrichus (F.Muell.) F.Muell.; Eurybia asterotricha F.Muell.; Olearia asterotricha F.Muell.

= Olearia asterotricha =

Rough daisy-bush

Species of shrub

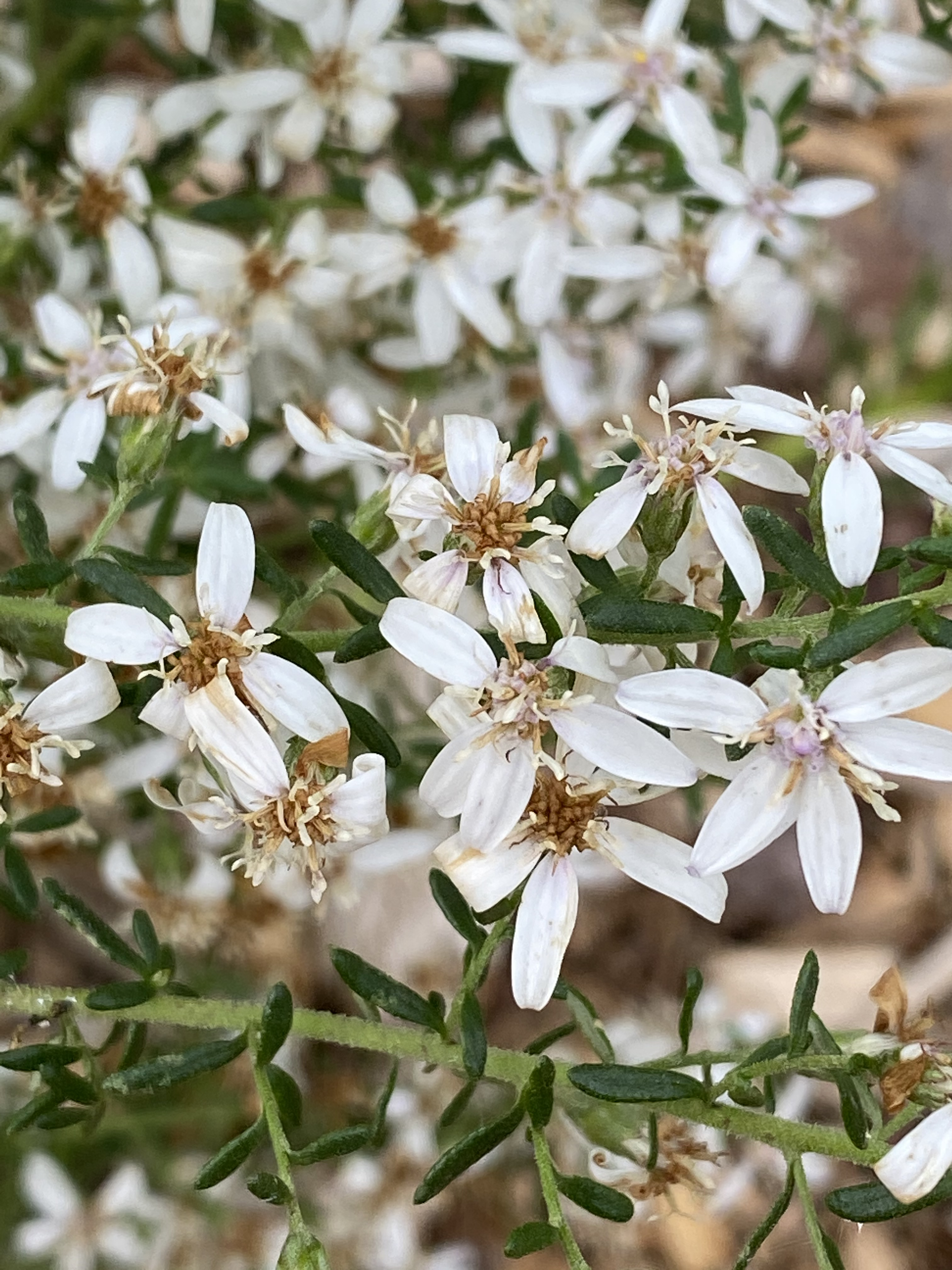
White form

Olearia asterotricha, commonly known as rough daisy-bush, is a species of flowering plant in the family Asteraceae. A tall shrub with white, mauve or blue daisy like flowers growing from the Blue Mountains in New South Wales to western Victoria, Australia.

== Description ==
Olearia asterotricha is small sprawling shrub to 1–2 m (3.3–6.6 ft) high and 1.5–2 m (4.9–6.6 ft) wide with an open habit. The branchlets are covered with densely matted woolly hairs, star-shaped hairs or a combination of both. It has white, pale mauve or blue daisy like flowers with a yellow or purplish centre. The flowers are 2–4 cm (0.79–1.6 in) in diameter and solitary or 25-40 per cluster and appear at the end of stems. Each inflorescence is on a peduncle about 50 mm (2.0 in) long. The bracts have fine short matted hairs and arranged in rows of 1-3. The dark green leaves are arranged alternately, sometimes with a very small stalk or without a stalk. The leaves are broadly-linear or oblong shaped, 0.6–2.5 cm (0.24–0.98 in) long and 0.2–0.8 cm (0.079–0.31 in) wide with rough star shaped hairs on the upper side of the leaves and stems. The underside of leaves is densely woolly, leaf margins are entire or toothed and rolled under. The fruit is cylindrical shape about 3 mm (0.12 in) long with 6-8 ribs about 3 mm (0.12 in) long. Fruit are smooth to sparsely covered with matted hairs. It contains a dry single seed that does not open on maturity.

== Taxonomy and naming ==
Rough daisy bush was first described in 1859 by Ferdinand von Mueller as Eurybia asterotricha and published in Fragmenta Phytographiae Australiae. In 1865 Mueller changed the name to Aster asterotrichus and in 1867 English botanist George Bentham changed the name to Olearia asterotricha in Flora Australiensis. The specific epithet (asterotricha) is derived from the ancient Greek words aster meaning "a star" and thrix, trichos meaning "hair".

In 2014, Andre Messina described four subspecies in Australian Systematic Botany and the names are accepted at the Australian Plant Census:

- Olearia asterotricha subsp. asterotricha - an upright shrub with mostly linear leaves about 13–45 mm (0.51–1.8 in) long and 2–4.5 mm (0.079–0.18 in) wide with the leaf edges wavy, rolled under, bent or slightly lobed;
- Olearia asterotricha subsp. glaucophylla - has bluish leaves, lobed edges from about halfway to apex and very small white protuberance at the leaf base;
- Olearia asterotricha subsp. lobata - a spreading shrub with linear, oblong or egg-shaped about 10–35 mm (0.39–1.4 in) and 3–9 mm (0.12–0.35 in) wide, the margins curved or flat and lobed with flowers appearing singly or in clusters of 2 or 3 on occasion 5, from October to December;
- Olearia asterotricha subsp. rotundifolia - a rounded erect shrub with broadly egg-shaped, sometimes slightly narrower leaves 10–25 mm (0.39–0.98 in) long, 7–14 mm (0.28–0.55 in) wide, the leaf margins be flat to slightly recurved, slightly lobed or with wavy depressions, the flowers appearing in December in clusters of 3 on a stalk 15–25 mm (0.59–0.98 in) long with a small mauve protuberance at the leaf base.

== Distribution and habitat ==
Rough daisy bush grows from the Blue Mountains, New South Wales to western Victoria where it grows mostly in cool damp acidic soils, heath, or dry sclerophyll forest. The species may vary depending on geographic region. In the Sydney region it is a compact shrub with white flowers and grey-green foliage. The Victorian form has mauve-blue flowers, green leaves and a more open form. Considered rare in Victoria.

- Olearia asterotricha subsp. asterotricha is only found at elevated sites in the Grampians National Park growing on sandy soils in heath woodlands.
- Olearia asterotricha subsp. glaucophylla grows north of Mittagong in New South Wales.
- Olearia asterotricha subsp. lobata grows in wet heathland or in moist forest usually found at lower altitudes. Also found in a few disjunct areas of southern Victoria but usually uncommon.
- Olearia asterotricha subsp. rotundifolia is believed to be restricted to a single population directly below the summit of Mt Langi Ghiran, Victoria. Growing in damp situations on southern slopes around granite boulders.
