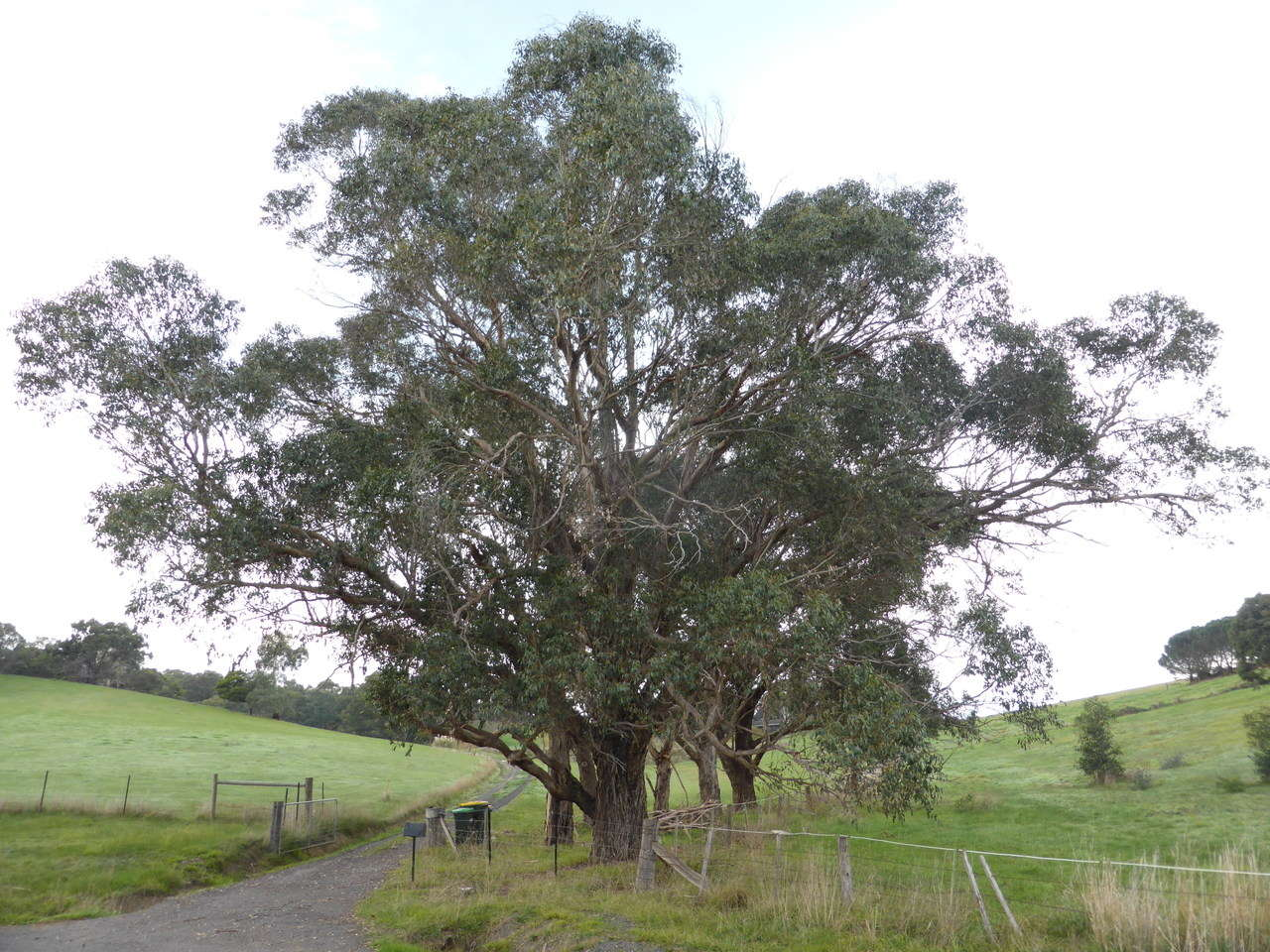
- Eucalyptus yarraensis near Arthurs Creek, Victoria

Conservation status
- Endangered (IUCN 3.1)

Scientific classification
- Kingdom: Plantae
- Clade: Tracheophytes
- Clade: Angiosperms
- Clade: Eudicots
- Clade: Rosids
- Order: Myrtales
- Family: Myrtaceae
- Genus: Eucalyptus
- Species: E. yarraensis

Binomial name
- Eucalyptus yarraensis Maiden & Cambage

= Eucalyptus yarraensis =

Yarra gum

Species of eucalyptus

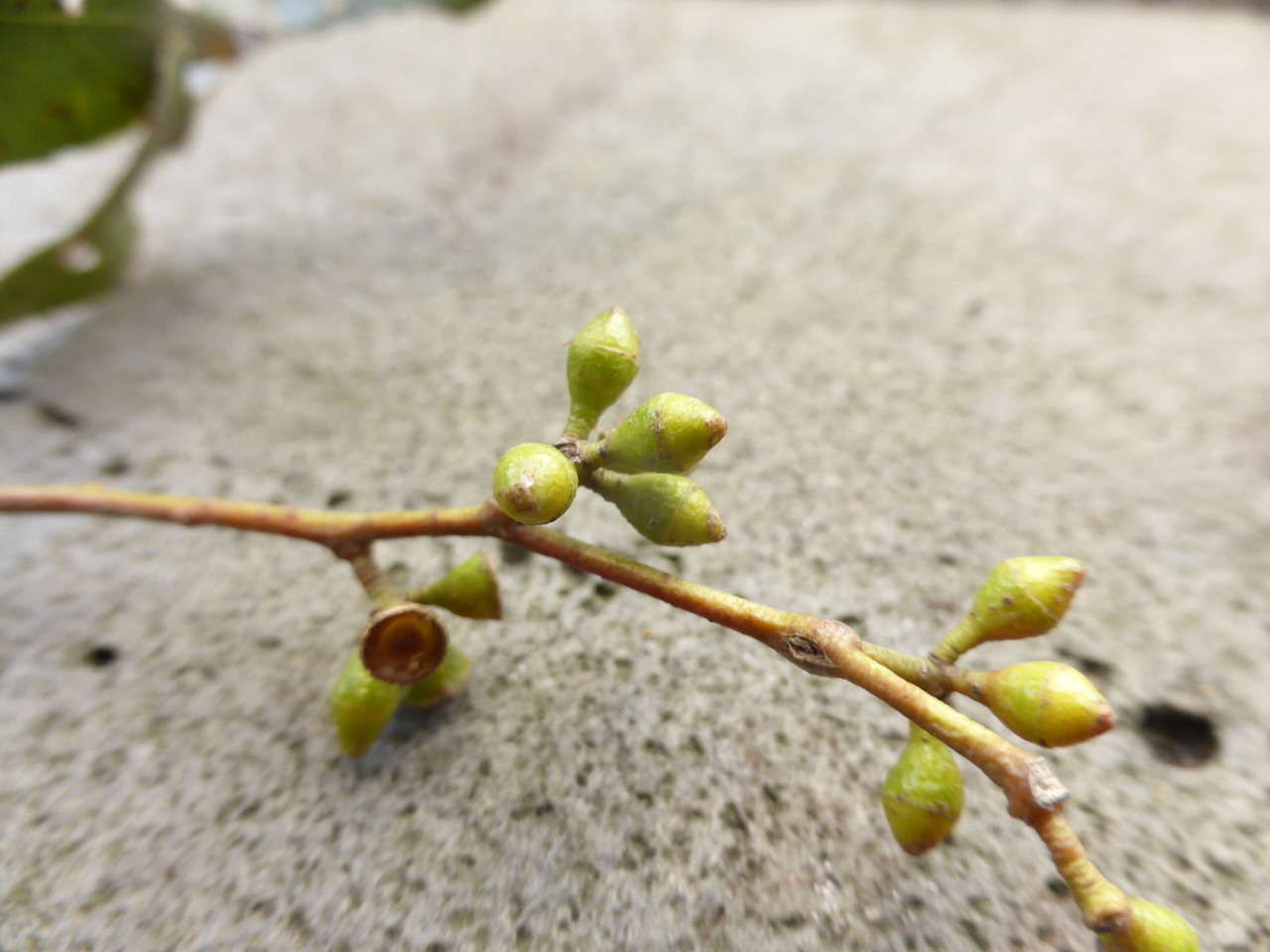
Flower buds and flowers

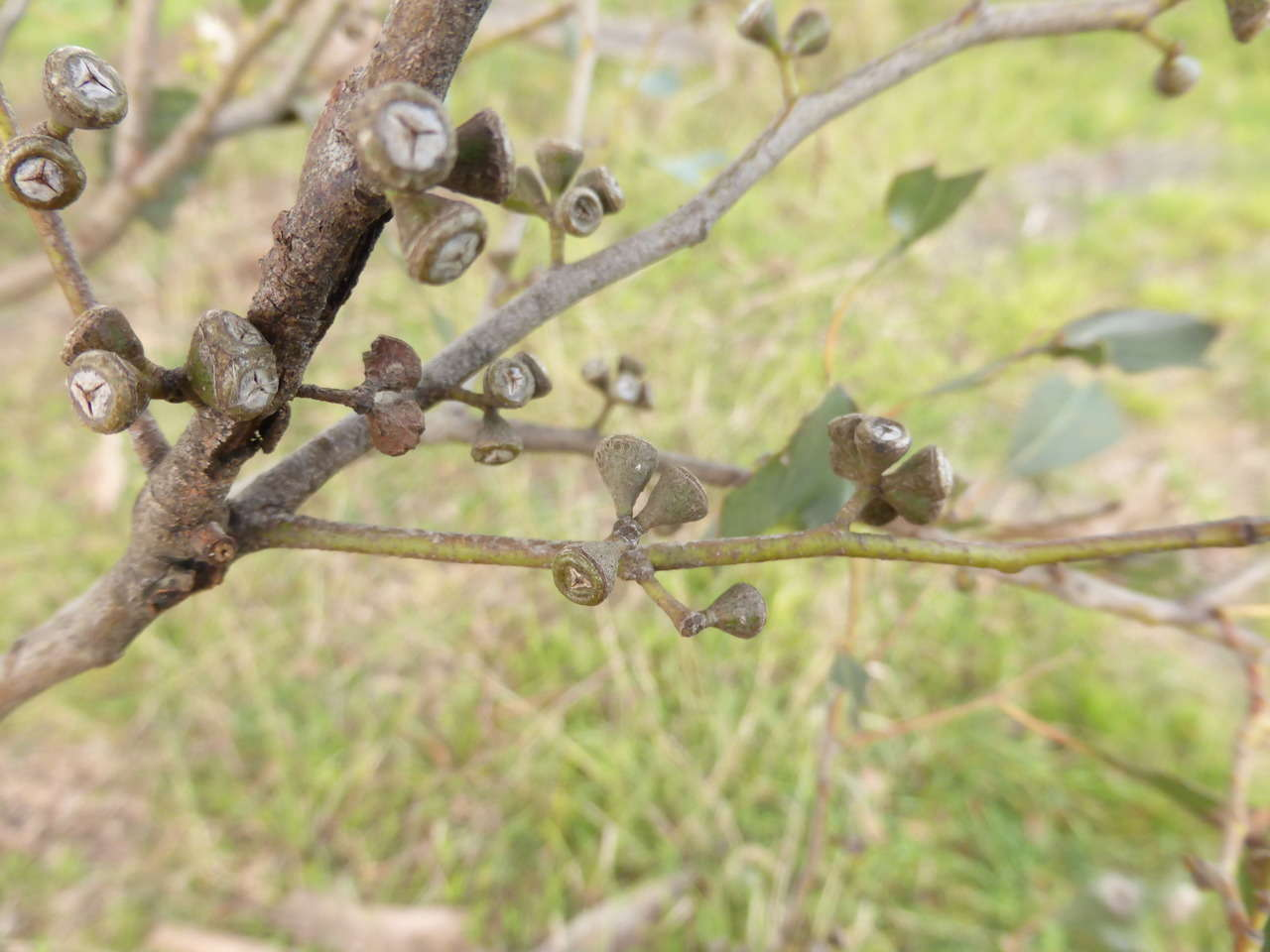
Fruit

Eucalyptus yarraensis, commonly known as Yarra gum, is a tree species that is endemic to Victoria, Australia. It has rough bark on the trunk and larger branches, lance-shaped to elliptical or egg-shaped adult leaves, flower buds in groups of seven, white flowers and conical fruit. In 2021 the Victorian Government listed it as critically endangered under the Flora and Fauna Guarantee Act.

== Description ==
Eucalyptus yarraensis is a tree that typically grows to a height of 15–20 m (49–66 ft) and forms a lignotuber. It has rough, fibrous, brown or greyish bark on the trunk and larger branches, smooth white to cream-coloured bark above. Young plants and coppice regrowth have glossy green, elliptical to egg-shaped leaves that are 25–63 mm (0.98–2.48 in) long and 20–43 mm (0.79–1.69 in) wide. Adult leaves are arranged alternately, the same shade of glossy green on both sides, lance-shaped to elliptical or egg-shaped, 60–135 mm (2.4–5.3 in) long and 17–40 mm (0.67–1.57 in) wide, tapering to a petiole 10–28 mm (0.39–1.10 in) long. The flower buds are arranged in leaf axils in groups of seven on an unbranched peduncle 4–15 mm (0.16–0.59 in) long, the individual buds on pedicels 2–3 mm (0.079–0.118 in) long. Mature buds are oval to diamond-shaped, 3–6 mm (0.12–0.24 in) long and 3–4 mm (0.12–0.16 in) wide with a conical or beaked operculum that is about the same length as the floral cup. Flowering occurs from September to December and the flowers are white. The fruit is a woody, conical capsule 3–5 mm (0.12–0.20 in) long and 4–5 mm (0.16–0.20 in) wide with the valves near rim level.

== Taxonomy and naming ==
Eucalyptus yarraensis was first formally described in 1922 by Joseph Maiden and Richard Hind Cambage in Maiden's book, A Critical Revision of the Genus Eucalyptus, from material collected by Cambage in the Yarra Valley near Healesville.

== Distribution and habitat ==
Yarra gum grows in valleys and nearby slopes in open woodland, now mostly cleared for agricultural use. It is found between Melbourne, Daylesford and Ararat.

== See also ==
- List of Eucalyptus species
