= Soul Wun =

Australian electronic musician

- Born: Blake Carthew; Ararat, Victoria, Australia
- Origin: Sydney, Australia
- Genres: Electronic; dance
- Occupations: Singer; songwriter; record producer
- Years active: 2018–present

Blake Carthew, known professionally as Soul Wun, is an Australian electronic musician.

In November 2024, Soul Wun released their debut album Blue Light.

In October 2026, their second album Kaleidoscope debuted at number 29 on the ARIA Charts.

== Discography ==
=== Albums ===
List of studio albums, with selected details
Title	Details	Peak chart positions
Title	Details	AUS
Blue Light	Released: November 2024; Label: Gallery Recordings; Formats: Digital download	—
Kaleidoscope	Released: 2 October 2026; Label: Gallery Recordings (GLRY049F); Formats: CD, LP, digital download	29

=== Extended plays ===
List of extended plays, with selected details
Title	Details
2291	Released: September 2018; Label: clipp.art (CLIPP039); Formats: Digital download
13th Hour Vol. 5 (split EP with deRijk)	Released: June 2020; Label: 13th Hour Records (13TH005); Formats: LP, digital download
Fragments	Released: August 2021; Label: SlothBoogie (SBJAMZ007); Formats: LP, digital download
Searching	Released: April 2023; Label: SlothBoogie (SBR007); Formats: LP, digital download
