= Fiery Creek (Victoria) =

- Location within Victoria

Location
- Country: Australia
- State: Victoria
- Local Government Areas: Rural City of Ararat; Shire of Pyrenees
- Towns: Raglan; Streatham

Physical characteristics
- Source
  - coordinates: 37.285°S 143.236°E
  - elevation: 760 metres (2,490 ft)
- Mouth: Lake Bolac
  - coordinates: 37.734°S 142.879°E
  - elevation: 212 metres (696 ft)

Basin features
- River system: Hopkins River
- Tributaries
  - left: Wongan Creek
  - right: Challicum Creek; Middle Creek
- Bridges: Western Freeway; Glenelg Highway; Western standard gauge railway line

Fiery Creek is a watercourse in western Victoria. It flows generally southerly from its source on the eastern side of Mount Cole in the Mount Cole State Forest to its mouth on the eastern side of Lake Bolac.

== Geology ==
Fiery Creek begins in hills that contain granite and erode to produce granitic sand. Much of its course is across almost-flat farmland. Towards the end of its course, it reaches a former lava flow which interrupts the course and leads it west to Lake Bolac.

== Water use ==
The Central Highlands Region Water Corporation extracts up to 419 megalitres (92,000,000 imp gal) of water from the upper catchment to supply town water to the town of Beaufort. Stream flow at Streatham has been recorded for over 100 years. It has increasing periods of zero flow, but the record flow was over 24,000 megalitres per day (5.3×10^{9} imp gal/d) in January 2011.

== Gold rush ==
Fiery Creek was involved in the Victorian gold rush in the 1850s. The diggings were in the upper reaches near Raglan. The post office that is now Streatham was named Fiery Creek, and mail was regularly addressed and sent to the wrong place.

Gold was discovered near Beaufort in 1852, in tributaries of Fiery Creek, and north of Beaufort in Fiery Creek from 1854. The population on the fields was 50,000 in 1855 and reportedly reached approximately 100,000 people at its height in the late 1850s and produced 450,000 ounces of gold over a two-year period, 1855–1856. The Fiery Creek gold rush started in 1854 and dissipated by 1859. Seven "puddling parties" remained by 1861. Dredging continued until around 1918.
