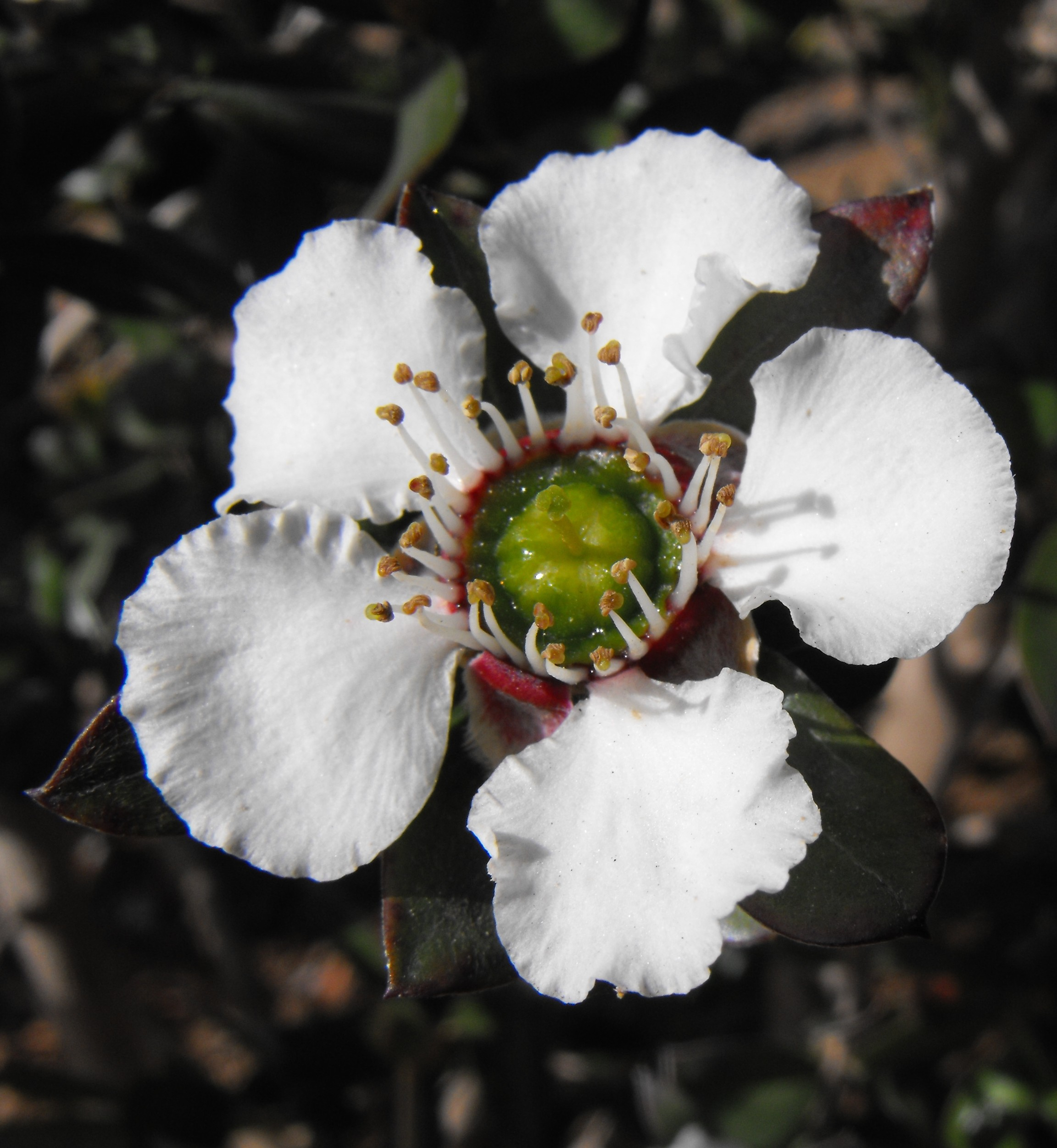
- Cultivated specimen in California

Scientific classification
- Kingdom: Plantae
- Clade: Tracheophytes
- Clade: Angiosperms
- Clade: Eudicots
- Clade: Rosids
- Order: Myrtales
- Family: Myrtaceae
- Genus: Leptospermum
- Species: L. turbinatum

Binomial name
- Leptospermum turbinatum Joy Thomps.

Synonyms
- Leptospermum nitidum auct. non Hook.f.: Willis, J.H. (1973)

= Leptospermum turbinatum =

Shiny tea-tree

Species of shrub

Leptospermum turbinatum, commonly known as shiny tea-tree, is a species of spreading shrub that is endemic to the Grampians and nearby ranges in Victoria, Australia. It has thin, rough bark, elliptical to lance-shaped leaves with the narrower end towards the base, relatively large white flowers and fruit that remains on the plant at maturity.

== Description ==
Leptospermum turbinatum is a spreading shrub that typically grows to a height of 1–3 m (3 ft 3 in – 9 ft 10 in). It has thin, rough bark with short, soft hairs on the youngest stems. The leaves are aromatic, elliptical to lance-shaped leaves with the narrower end towards the base, 10–25 mm (0.39–0.98 in) long and 3–8 mm (0.12–0.31 in) wide with a sharply pointed tip and tapering to a short petiole. The flowers are white, about 25 mm (0.98 in) wide and arranged singly on leafy side branches. The floral cup is covered with long, silky hairs, about 3 mm (0.12 in) long tapering to a short pedicel. The sepals are also hairy, long triangular and 5–7 mm (0.20–0.28 in) long. The five petals are about 12 mm (0.47 in) long and the stamens about 5 mm (0.20 in) long. Flowering mainly occurs in November and the fruit is a capsule 7–11 mm (0.28–0.43 in) wide with the remains of the sepals attached and that remains on the plant at maturity.

== Taxonomy and naming ==
The species was first formally described by Joy Thompson in Telopea in 1989 based on specimens collected in 1952 on Mackays Peak in the Serra Range, in the Grampians National Park. The specific epithet refers to the shape of the fruit.

== Distribution and habitat ==
The shiny tea-tree grows on rocky sandstone slopes and near granite outcrops in the Grampians National Park and nearby mountains.
