= Raglan, Victoria =

Raglan Victoria
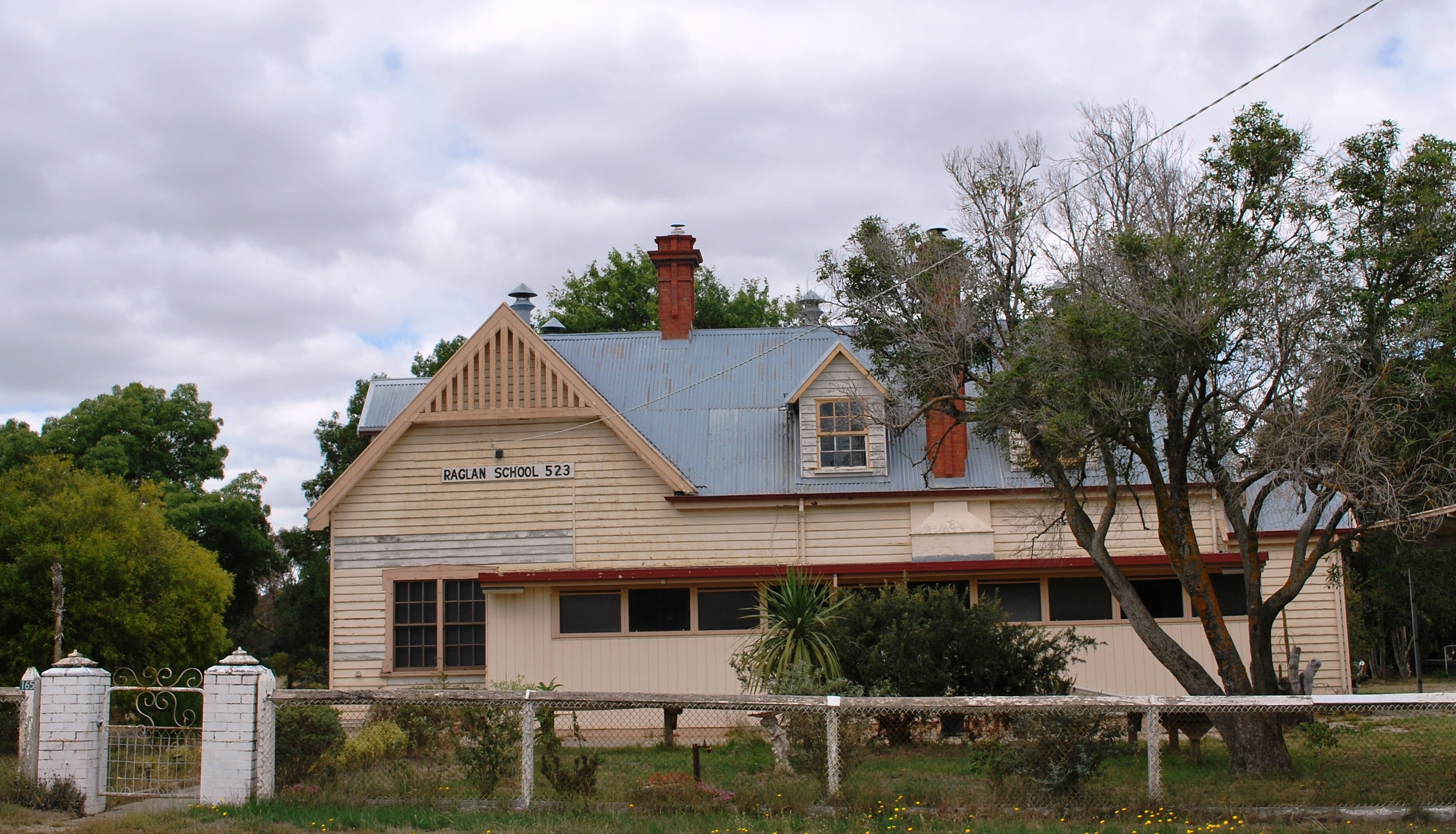
- The former Raglan school is now owned privately and used as a residence

- Coordinates: 37°22′S 143°21′E
- Population: 223 (2021 census)
- Postcode(s): 3373
- Location: 177 km (110 mi) WNW of Melbourne; 65 km (40 mi) WNW of Ballarat; 12 km (7 mi) N of Beaufort
- LGA(s): Pyrenees Shire
- State electorate(s): Ripon
- Federal division(s): Wannon
Mean max temp	Mean min temp	Annual rainfall
?	?	550 mm 21.7 in

Raglan is a town in western Victoria, Australia. It is located 177 kilometres (110 mi) north west of the state capital, Melbourne in the Shire of Pyrenees local government area. At the 2021 census, Raglan had a population of 223.

== History ==
Many of the residents of Raglan are descendants of the first European settlers of the area who displaced Aboriginal hunter-gatherers from the valleys and slopes below Mount Cole, with various roads and lanes bearing the family names of those settlers. Djab wurrung was the primary language before European settlement and some early arrivals in the region like Tom Wills of Ararat, spoke it. Major Thomas Mitchell, surveyor, reported surprising two women of the Utoul balug and their children near Mount Cole in 1836. Conflicts with settlers continued into the 1840s, broken by 1848 by the Border Police and the Native Police Corps. The remaining Mount Cole clans were taken to Framlingham and Coranderrk stations. The Campbell brothers on Mount Cole protected Beeripmo balug and Utoul balug clans on their sheep property until the 1860s.

Raglan was named after FitzRoy Somerset, 1st Baron Raglan who was a Field Marshal during the Crimean War. it was surveyed in 1855, a few kilometres north-west of Musical Gully which was the first of the finds which provoked the Fiery Creek gold rush. After the initial flurry of mining, farming and wood cutting emerged as the main industries. Messmate from the westerly Mount Cole forest was cut in large quantities, and in the 1860s there were two sawmills at Raglan. There were also two hotels and a school (1861).

Gold mining had taken off in the 1850s, and took the form of extensive digging of individual pits in the Fiery Creek valley and on the slopes of Mount Cole. The gold areas generally followed the Beaufort-Amphitheatre Road. There was a population influx to Raglan and nearby Beaufort. 1002 men occupied the Fiery Creek diggings and 18 police were stationed there to keep law and order. The Mitchell’s Gully water race supplied water to the Ballarat Goldmining Company, from Mount Cole to the head of Mitchell’s Gully. About 5 km north-east of Raglan was Chute, also a goldfield village (it was named Carlton until the 1880s). Chute had a store and school. By 1900 Raglan town had a population of only 300, and the gold yield had diminished to 6,000 oz/yr.

== Raglan today ==
The town has, like many in central Victoria, rusty remnants of gold mining equipment from the intensive Victorian gold rush scattered around privately owned land. There are also interesting examples of "bush Architecture" in the area, with a number of buildings still standing from the late 19th and the early 20th century. Belmont at 643 Main Lead Road dates from 1858, and was built by a successful mining engineer, James Frazer Watkins.

The main industry of Raglan is sheep grazing with sundry support businesses including livestock transport. Other financially independent residents have relocated rurally, moved from the state capital, Melbourne or from the regional center of Ballarat. Mount Cole Road hosts a former artist's colony of mud brick houses and studios built in the 1970s, constructed on cheap land scarred by gold mining. One was occupied by Walkley Award-winning cartoonist George Haddon until 2016.

There are no retail businesses or public services so residents travel to Beaufort for essential services, including schooling. Raglan Post Office opened on 1 January 1865 and closed in 1960 (an earlier office of the same name was renamed Beaufort in 1863). The Primary School closed in 1996.
