= Mount Cole State Forest =

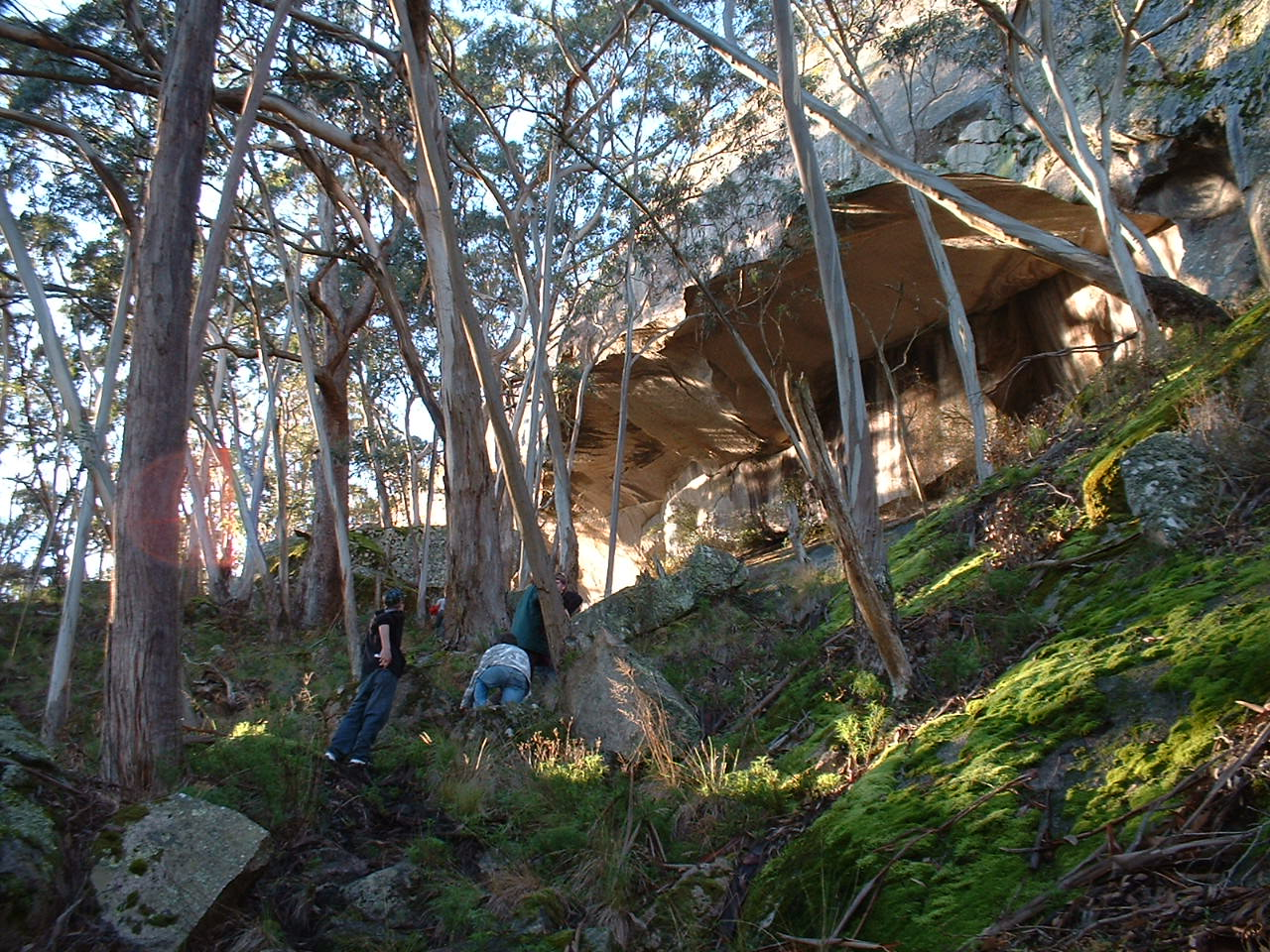
Rock cave on Cave Hill, Mount Cole State Forest

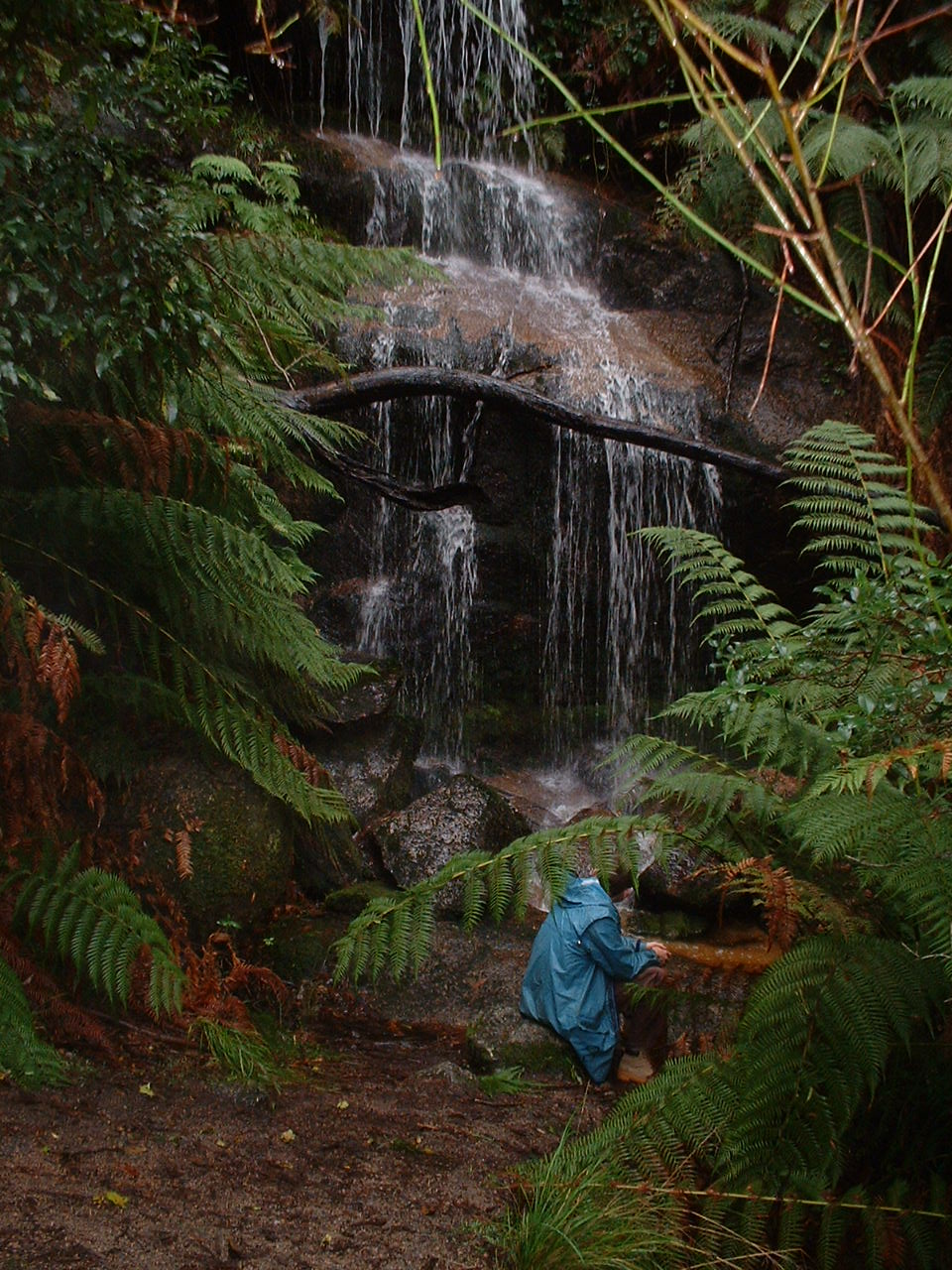
The Ferntree Waterfalls, Mount Cole State Forest, Victoria, Australia

The Mount Cole State Forest is in western Victoria, Australia, near the town of Beaufort. The forest is around Mount Cole, which formed 390 million years ago. The Indigenous Australians, the Beeripmo balug people, called it Bereep-bereep, which means wild. The forest covers an area of 12,150 hectares, including the forest around Mount Lonarch.

The forest is on a plateau which is above grassy plains. The plateau is about 760 metres above sea level. High peaks in the forest include Mount Buangor (1,090 metres), Mount Cole (899 metres) and Ben Nevis (877 metres).

The main trees in the southern part of the forest are messmate (Eucalyptus obliqua), manna gum (Eucalyptus viminalis), and blue gums (Eucalyptus globulus). In the north, which is drier, there are yellow box (Eucalyptus melliodora), and red stringybark (Eucalyptus macrorhyncha). There is also the rare Mount Cole grevillea, Grevillea montis-cole. Bushfires in February 2024 burnt all of the known habitat areas of the Mount Cole Greville with the species showing signs of regeneration in October of that year. On the high peaks there are groups of snow gums (Eucalyptus pauciflora).

There have been 130 different birds seen in the forest, including the powerful owl (Ninox strenua). Animals include kangaroos, wallabies, echidna, koalas and possums. In 1954, 160 koalas were set free in the forest to as part of a plan to re-establish the animals in Victorian forests. In the 19th century, deer were introduced and Sambar deer are still living in the wet gullies in the south of the forest.

Activities in the forest include camping, walking, four wheel driving, horse riding, and bird watching.

The forest supplies good quality hardwood logs for sawmills. The management plan for the forest also protects the water catchments of several creeks which supply water to nearby towns.

On 24 June 2021, the Andrews State Government, following an extensive review and recommendation, declerated that the Mt Cole State Forest would be added to the National Park register, providing it with additional protections. The proposed Mt Buangor National Park would be staged over the next 8 years in addition to 60,000 hectares of State forests and parks also to be added.

== Mount Buangor State Park ==
An area of 1,940 hectares, the Mount Buangor State Park, was protected from logging in 1973. This park includes the waterfalls on Middle Creek, and the large rock faces and caves on Cave Hill.

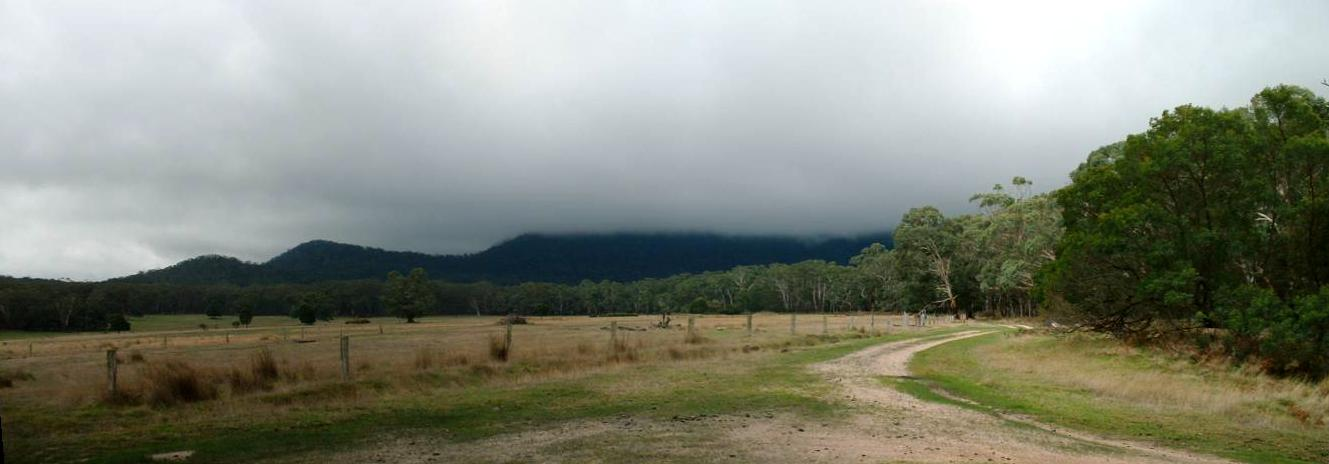
Mount Cole State Forest in clouds, looking from Middle Creek, Victoria, Australia

== Climate ==
As the ranges face into the prevailing westerly storm track, maximum temperatures are particularly cold for the altitude and latitude. Heavy snowfalls occur regularly throughout the year, and sub-freezing daily maximum temperatures have been recorded well into spring at Lookout Hill (965 metres). Cold weather is present even at the height of summer: on 2 February 2005, the daily maximum did not exceed 4.5 °C (40.1 °F) at Lookout Hill.

The ranges can be classed as having a cold Mediterranean climate (Csb). Winters are extraordinarily cloudy, evident from the afternoon relative humidity readings at Lookout Hill.

Climate data for Lookout Hill (1991–2007); 965 m AMSL; 37.28° S, 143.25° E
Month	Jan	Feb	Mar	Apr	May	Jun	Jul	Aug	Sep	Oct	Nov	Dec	Year
Record high °C (°F)	37.7 (99.9)	36.2 (97.2)	32.2 (90.0)	26.1 (79.0)	19.0 (66.2)	13.7 (56.7)	14.3 (57.7)	18.6 (65.5)	22.6 (72.7)	28.1 (82.6)	30.8 (87.4)	35.4 (95.7)	37.7 (99.9)
Mean daily maximum °C (°F)	21.5 (70.7)	21.8 (71.2)	18.0 (64.4)	13.9 (57.0)	9.8 (49.6)	7.0 (44.6)	6.2 (43.2)	7.8 (46.0)	9.8 (49.6)	12.6 (54.7)	15.9 (60.6)	19.9 (67.8)	13.7 (56.6)
Mean daily minimum °C (°F)	9.9 (49.8)	10.4 (50.7)	8.3 (46.9)	6.5 (43.7)	4.5 (40.1)	2.8 (37.0)	2.0 (35.6)	2.4 (36.3)	3.2 (37.8)	4.3 (39.7)	6.2 (43.2)	8.2 (46.8)	5.7 (42.3)
Record low °C (°F)	−2.4 (27.7)	0.1 (32.2)	−2.5 (27.5)	−2.6 (27.3)	−5.5 (22.1)	−2.0 (28.4)	−2.5 (27.5)	−3.7 (25.3)	−2.9 (26.8)	−2.5 (27.5)	−2.1 (28.2)	−0.2 (31.6)	−5.5 (22.1)
Average precipitation mm (inches)	50.6 (1.99)	50.3 (1.98)	36.1 (1.42)	51.0 (2.01)	60.6 (2.39)	110.2 (4.34)	95.1 (3.74)	87.4 (3.44)	91.0 (3.58)	71.5 (2.81)	55.2 (2.17)	42.8 (1.69)	825.3 (32.49)
Average precipitation days (≥ 0.2 mm)	9.2	8.7	10.3	11.2	15.2	20.0	20.4	17.0	17.0	16.4	12.6	12.9	170.9
Average afternoon relative humidity (%)	51	51	57	66	82	89	89	81	76	68	62	53	69
Source: Australian Bureau of Meteorology; Lookout Hill

Climate data for Ben Nevis (2007–2022); 875 m AMSL; 37.23° S, 143.20° E
Month	Jan	Feb	Mar	Apr	May	Jun	Jul	Aug	Sep	Oct	Nov	Dec	Year
Record high °C (°F)	40.8 (105.4)	40.5 (104.9)	35.6 (96.1)	29.9 (85.8)	20.9 (69.6)	14.2 (57.6)	14.6 (58.3)	17.1 (62.8)	23.7 (74.7)	29.3 (84.7)	36.1 (97.0)	39.8 (103.6)	40.8 (105.4)
Mean daily maximum °C (°F)	25.4 (77.7)	23.9 (75.0)	20.3 (68.5)	15.8 (60.4)	11.0 (51.8)	8.2 (46.8)	7.3 (45.1)	8.4 (47.1)	11.8 (53.2)	15.8 (60.4)	19.0 (66.2)	22.3 (72.1)	15.8 (60.4)
Mean daily minimum °C (°F)	12.5 (54.5)	12.0 (53.6)	10.3 (50.5)	8.2 (46.8)	5.4 (41.7)	3.7 (38.7)	2.6 (36.7)	2.7 (36.9)	4.1 (39.4)	6.1 (43.0)	8.2 (46.8)	10.1 (50.2)	7.2 (44.9)
Record low °C (°F)	2.4 (36.3)	4.1 (39.4)	1.7 (35.1)	0.5 (32.9)	−1.0 (30.2)	−0.8 (30.6)	−1.7 (28.9)	−2.2 (28.0)	−1.7 (28.9)	−2.6 (27.3)	0.1 (32.2)	−0.3 (31.5)	−2.6 (27.3)
Average precipitation mm (inches)	44.4 (1.75)	32.2 (1.27)	43.1 (1.70)	45.3 (1.78)	75.0 (2.95)	77.3 (3.04)	80.7 (3.18)	87.6 (3.45)	72.2 (2.84)	60.3 (2.37)	62.9 (2.48)	43.5 (1.71)	741.3 (29.19)
Average precipitation days (≥ 0.2 mm)	7.0	7.0	9.8	13.1	20.2	21.6	22.7	23.5	18.5	14.3	12.9	10.3	180.9
Source: Australian Bureau of Meteorology; Ben Nevis
