= Langi Ghiran State Park =

- IUCN category V (protected landscape/seascape)
- Location within Victoria
- Location: Victoria
- Nearest city: Ararat
- Coordinates: 37°18′S 143°07′E
- Area: 26.95 km^{2} (10.41 sq mi)
- Governing body: Parks Victoria
- Website: Official website

The Langi Ghiran State Park is 14 km east of Ararat in the state of Victoria, Australia. The park covers an area of 2695 ha.

The park can be used for camping, walking and driving. It has steep granite peaks and gentle sloping open woodland sections. The name Langi Ghiran, a corruption of "Lar-ne-jeering" in the language of the local Djab Wurrung people, means "Home of the Yellow-tailed Black Cockatoos".

Other parks nearby are Mount Buangor to the east and the Grampians/Gariwerd to the distant west.

== History ==
The first European to climb Mount Langi Ghiran was the explorer Thomas Mitchell, on his 1836 expedition through "Australia Felix". He named it Mount Mistake.

There are two reservoirs in the park, built from blocks of local granite in the 1880s. The main reservoir forms part of the water supply for Ararat.

A short-lived "spot mill", for processing timber, was built on the northern slopes in 1940, but little evidence remains of its existence.
