= Ararat Football Club =

Ararat Football / Netball Club

Names
- Full name: Ararat Football Netball Club
- Nickname: Rats

2025 season
- After finals: 2nd
- Home-and-away season: 1st
- Pre-season: 1st
- Leading goalkicker: Tom Williamson (44)
- Olver Memorial Medal: Tom Williamson

Club details
- Founded: 1871; 155 years ago
- Colours
- Competition: Wimmera Football League
- President: David Hosking
- Coach: Tom Williamson
- Premierships: (22): 1903, 1904, 1905, 1908, 1911, 1912, 1914, 1920, 1949, 1951, 1955, 1956, 1957, 1958, 1971, 1975, 1986, 1999, 2001, 2023, 2024, 2025
- Ground: Alexandra Oval, Ararat (capacity: 8,000)

Uniforms
Home

Other information
- Official website: https://araratfootballnetball.com.au/

The Ararat Football Club, nicknamed the Rats, is an Australian rules football and netball club based in the city of Ararat, Victoria. The football team currently competes in the Wimmera Football League (WFL).

== History ==
Formed in 1871, Ararat won eight premierships in the Wimmera and District Football Association during the early 20th century.

When Ararat won the 1912 premiership, the winning team was presented with 20 combination sets of a jam spoon, bread fork and a butter knife.

From 1924 to 1928, they played in the Ballarat Football League. They did not return to the Wimmera District Football League until 1930, as they were forced to sit out of the competition for a year as punishment for their earlier defection. From 1934 to 1936 they took part in Ballarat-Wimmera FL.

The Wimmera Football League was reformed in 1937 and Ararat have participated since the beginning. They are the second most successful club in the league in terms of premierships, behind Horsham.

Their greatest era came in the 1950s when they won four consecutive premierships, under former Essendon player Percy Bushby at the helm.

== Football Premierships ==
Seniors

- Wimmera District Football Association (8)
  - 1903, 1904, 1905, 1908, 1911, 1912, 1914, 1920
- Wimmera Football League (14)
  - 1949, 1951, 1955, 1956, 1957, 1958, 1971, 1975, 1986, 1999, 2001, 2023, 2024, 2025

Reserves

- Wimmera Football League (12)
  - 1973, 1978, 1981, 1987, 1993, 1994, 1999, 2002, 2006, 2019, 2023, 2026

Thirds

- Wimmera Football League (15)
  - 1978, 1982, 1996, 1998, 2000, 2006, 2007, 2009, 2010, 2011, 2012, 2015, 2017, 2018, 2022,

== Netball Premierships ==
A. Grade

- 1975, 1977, 1979, 1980, 1981, 1982, 1985, 1987, 1988, 1989, 1991, 1993, 1994, 1997

B. Grade

- 1978, 1979, 1983, 1984, 1985, 1991

C. Grade

- ?

C. Reserve

- ?

17 & Under

- 1977, 1978, 1981, 1984, 1988, 1989

== League Best & Fairest ==
Senior Football

- Ballarat Wimmera Football League - George McKenzie Medal
  - 1934 - E Ted Bourke
- Wimmera Football League - Pat J Toohey Medal
  - 1956 - Jack Antonio
  - 1963 - Jim Bonner
  - 1971 - Leo Maloney
  - 1973 - Laurie Stephens
  - 1992 - Glen Antonio (son of Jack Antonio)
  - 2002 - Matt Jackson
  - 2003 - Dale Bligh
  - 2008 - Allen Batchelor
  - 2018 - Dale Mendes
  - 2023 - Jake Robinson
  - 2024 - Tom Williamson
  - 2025 - Ben Taylor
  - 2026 - Tom Williamson

Reserves

- Wimmera Football League
  - 1976 - Peter Shearer
  - 1979 - Shane Todd
  - 1991 - Mick Spalding
  - 1998, 1999, 2000 - Darren Bahl
  - 2025, 2026 - Alan Batchelor

Thirds

- Wimmera Football League
  - 1980 - Dave Williams
  - 1982 - Murray McKinnis
  - 1996 - Shane Krings
  - 2003 - Alan Batchelor
  - 2012, 2013 - Alex Laidlaw
  - 2016 - Jack Antonio
  - 2017 - Corri Corrigan
  - 2021 - Sonny Kettle
  - 2023 - Patrick Toner

== League Goalkicking ==
Wimmera Football League

Seniors

- 1946 - Dick Drever: 68
- 1950 - Bill Smeaton: 110 (120)
- 1954 - Bill Smeaton: 50+
- 1955 - Bill Smeaton: 128

== VFL/AFL players ==
The following footballers played with Ararat FNC, prior to playing senior football in the VFL/AFL, and / or drafted, with the year indicating their VFL/AFL debut.

- 1929 - Tom Byrne - AFC 1927, 18 games > Carlton 1929, 4 games > Hawthorn 1935-39 61 games
- 1930 - Henry Thomson - AFC 1925-28, 58 games > Carlton 1930, 1 game
- 1930 - Jim Williamson - AFC 1928, 30-31 38 games > Carlton 1930, 1 game
- 1962 - Henry Ogilvie - AFC 1958-61, 64, 55 games > Carlton 1962-63, 2 games
- 2017 - Tom Williamson - AFC 2014-15, 12 games > Carlton 2017-, 18 games
- 1954 - Alan Young - AFC 1952-53, 19 games > Collingwood 1954, 3 games
- 1966 - Barry Price - AFC 20 games > Collingwood 1966-75, 79, 158 games
- 1976 - Lex Pritchard - AFC 1971-74, 23 games > Collingwood 1976-77 3 games
- 1982 - Neil Peart - AFC 1976, 80, 29 games > Collingwood 1982, 13 games > Richmond 1983-84, 86, 40 games > Footscray 1985, 9 games
- 1982 - Chris Dalkin - AFC 1978-81, 86, 93, 61 games > Collingwood 1982-83, 85, 18 games
- 1912 - Billy Harvey - AFC 1911 8 games > Essendon 1912, 3 games
- 1969 - Doug Tassell - AFC 1967-69 84 games > Essendon 1969-70, 20 games
- 1971 - Barry Grinter - AFC 1969 15 games > Essendon 1971-72, 74-76, 78 games > Richmond 1978, 6 games
- 2013 - Lauchlan Dalgleish - AFC 2009-11, 12 games > Essendon 2013, 3 games
- 1917 - Dave Crone - AFC 1913, 8 games > Fitzroy 3 games, Carlton 1917-20, 22 games
- 1965 - Daryl Peoples - AFC 1962-65, 64 games > Fitzroy 1965-70, 77 games
- 1965 - Terry Brady - AFC 1962-68, 115 games > Fitzroy 1965, 1 game
- 1927 - Henry Power - AFC 1924, 1926–28, 22 games > Footscray 1927, 2 games
- 1929 - Eugene Sullivan - AFC 1927-28, 35, 37, 33 games > Footscray 1929, 3 games
- 1904 - William Burns - AFC 1904-06, 10 games > Geelong 1904 2 games
- 1928 - Milton White - AFC 1922 4 games > Geelong 1928-29, 6 games
- 1957 - Ian O'Halloran - AFC 1956-57, 18 games > Geelong 1957, 3 games
- 1926 - Stuart Stewart - AFC 1924-25, 18 games > Hawthorn 1926-35 130 games
- 1906 - Fred Sleeman - AFC 1905, 7 games > Melbourne 1906, 14 games
- 1951 - William Smeaton - AFC 1948-50, 65-56 > Melbourne 1951-52, 17 games
- 1951 - Jack Clark - AFC 1946-51, 55.56, 59, 113 games > Nth Melbourne 1951, 2 games
- 1961 - Kevin Fitzgerald - AFC 1960, 13 games > Richmond 1961, 1 game
- 1991 - Scott Turner - AFC 1987-88, 90, 06, 08-12, 59 games > Richmond 1991-00, 144 games
- 1911 - Ted Brown - AFC 1911-13, 20 games > St. Kilda 1911 4 games > Carlton 1914-20, 95 games
- 1935 - Joe Garbutt Jr. - AFC 1925-26, 22 games > St Kilda 1935, 7 games
- 1904 - Harry 'Duxie' Gibson - AFC 1897-08, 10, 68 games > Sth Melbourne 1904-06, 41 games
- 1958 - Gerald Brennan - AFC 1957-61, 67, 70 games > Sth Melbourne 1958, 60, 7 games

The following footballers played senior VFL / AFL football prior to playing and / or coaching with Ararat with the year indicating their first season at AFNC.

- 1931 - Bill Twomey Senior
- 1934 - Ted Bourke
- 1939 - Ron Fisher
- 1954 - Perc Bushby

Killed in action during World War One.

- 1917 - Billy Harvey
