= Ararat & District Football Association =

- Sport: Australian rules football Netball
- Founded: 1922; 104 years ago
- Folded: 1999
- No. of teams: 6
- Country: Australia
- Confederation: AFL Victoria
- Most titles: Trinity, St Andrews/Caledonians, Miners (10)
- Level on pyramid: 2

The Ararat & District Football Association was an Australian rules football League based around Ararat in Western Victoria.

== History ==
The ADFA was the minor league in Ararat with clubs named after churches, mills and mines. The competition was regarded as the minor league of the area, whilst the major club in town, the Ararat Football Club played in the Wimmera Football League.

This association was founded in 1922 and was re-figured and calibrated several times in its first ten years of existence.

- 1922 Ararat & District Junior Football Association
- 1927 Dobie Football Association
- 1928 Ararat Inter-church Football Association
- 1931 Ararat & District Football Association

Until the mid 1990s, the nine club league had six clubs drawing players out of Ararat and three clubs with predominantly Stawell based players. However, during the 90s there was a population decline in Ararat. Aradale Mental Hospital was closed, alongside government bodies which supplied employment for the town, this forced clubs to merge due to low numbers.

The league finished in 1999 which saw teams splitting into the Horsham & District Football League and Mininera & District Football League.

== Final clubs ==
Club	Colours	Nickname	Home Ground	Former League	Est.	Years in ADFA	ADFA Senior Premierships		Fate
Club	Colours	Nickname	Home Ground	Former League	Est.	Years in ADFA	Total	Years	Fate
Caledonians-Miners		Saints	Ararat City Band Centre, Ararat	–	1996	1996-1999	1	1999	Became Ararat United and moved to Mininera & District FL in 2000
Great Western		Demons	Great Western Public Park Reserve, Great Western	SWFL	1880s	1922-1925, 1933–1949, 1953–1999	3	1963, 1972, 1983	Moved to Stawell & District FA in 1926 and 1950. Moved to Horsham & District FL in 2000
Moyston		Tigers	Moyston Recreation Reserve, Moyston	–	1890	1922-1999	5	1967, 1968, 1969, 1990, 1991	Merged with Willaura to form Moyston-Willaura in Mininera & District FL
Prestige-Trinity		Dragons	Gordon Street Oval, Ararat	–	1996	1996-1999	0	-	Merged with St Marys to form Ararat Eagles in Horsham & District FL in 2000
St Marys (CYMS 1934-35)		Kangaroos	Alexandra Oval, Ararat	–	1920s	1928-1935, 1938-1999	9	1928, 1946, 1952, 1953, 1970, 1971, 1992, 1997, 1998	Recess in 1936-37. Merged with Prestige-Trinity to form Ararat Eagles in Horsham & District FL in 2000
Swifts		Baggies	North Park, Stawell	SWFL	1913	1970-1999	5	1977, 1989, 1993, 1994	Moved to Horsham & District FL in 2000

== Previous clubs ==
Club	Colours	Nickname	Home Ground	Former League	Est.	Years in ADFA	ADFA Senior Premierships		Fate
Club	Colours	Nickname	Home Ground	Former League	Est.	Years in ADFA	Total	Years	Fate
Ararat Ex Students				–	1945	1945-1946	0	-	Folded in 1947
Ararat Juniors				–	1921	1922	1	1922	Folded in 1922
Ararat Imperials				–	1922	1923-1927	2	1923, 1924	Folded in 1927
Armstrong				–	1923	1923	0	-	Folded after 1923 season
Buangor	(1929) (1946-65)	Ramblers	Des Brennan Park, Buangor	RFA	1900s	1927, 1931, 1937, 1946–1965	0	-	Returned to Ripon FA in 1928 and 1938. Recess after 1931 season. Folded in 1966
Caledonians (St Andrews 1928-55)		Demons	Ararat City Band Centre, Ararat	–	1928	1928-1995	10	1931, 1933, 1950, 1954, 1955, 1957, 1975, 1985, 1986, 1987	Merged with Miners to form Miners-Caledonians in 1996
Cathcart					1903	1922-1926	0	-	Folded after 1926 season
Dobie			Dobie Recreation Reserve, Dobie	BDFA		1927, 1930	1	1927	1928-29 unknown, folded after 1930 season
Elmhurst			Elmhurst Recreation Reserve, Elmhurst	LFL	1900s	1949-1950	0	-	Folded in 1951
Glenorchy			Glenorchy Recreation Reserve, Glenorchy	SWFL	1894	1970-1972, 1976	0	-	Recess between 1973-75. Folded after 1976 season
Halls Gap			Halls Gap Recreation Reserve, Halls Gap	SWFL	1952	1970-1975	0	-	Folded in 1976
Joel		Rovers		SWFL	1890s	1939-1940	1	1939	Folded in 1941
Lake Bolac		Bombers	Lake Bolac Recreation Reserve, Lake Bolac	WFA	1880s	1926	0	-	Moved to Willaura & District FA in 1927
Landsborough		Burras	Landsborough Recreation Reserve, Landsborough	LFL, SWFL	1896	1937-1939, 1950-1952, 1957–1964	2	1960, 1961	Recess in 1940, re-formed in Lexton FL in 1947. Returned to Lexton FL in 1953 and 1965
Maroona			Maroona Recreation Reserve, Maroona	–	1922	1922-1924	0	-	Folded after 1924 season
Miners (Methodists 1928-72)		Miners	Kokoda Park, Ararat	–	1928	1928-1995	10	1934, 1935, 1937, 1938, 1949, 1958, 1959, 1973, 1974, 1976	Merged with Caledonians to form Caledonians-Miners in 1996
Prestige			Maroona Recreation Reserve, Maroona	–	1945	1946-1995	4	1951, 1956, 1966, 1988	Merged with Trinity to form Prestige-Trinity in 1996
Trinity (Church of England 1925-30)		Bulldogs	Gordon Street Oval, Ararat	–	1925	1925-1995	10	1929, 1930, 1932, 1936, 1947, 1948, 1963, 1964, 1965, 1979	Merged with Prestige to form Prestige-Trinity in 1996
Warrak			Warrak Recreation Reserve, Warrak	RFA	1900s	1931-1937	0	-	Folded in 1937
Warriors		Warriors	North Park, Stawell	SWFL	1890s	1970-1997	8	1940, 1978, 1980, 1981, 1982, 1984, 1995, 1996	Absorbed by Stawell in the Wimmera FL in 1998
Willaura		Saints	Willaura Recreation Reserve, Willaura	WFA	1900s	1925-1926	2	1926, 1927	Moved to Mininera & District FL in 1927

== Association Football Records ==
Notable Records
Record		Details	Year
Highest Score	414 Points	St Marys.65.24.414 (v Moyston 3.0.18)	1998
Most Goals in a Match	27 Goals	Geoff LePoidevin - St Marys (v Moyston)	1998
Most Goals in a Season	155 Goals	Danny Aldersea – Caledonians FC	1975
Most Consecutive Premierships	3	Moyston FC	1967–1969
Most Consecutive Premierships	3	Warriors FC	1980–1982
Most Consecutive Premierships	3	Caledonians	1985–1987
Most Consecutive Wins	38 Wins	Swifts FC	1993–1995
Most Consecutive Losses	56 Losses	Moyston	1996–1999

== Premiers ==
- 1922 Ararat Juniors 6 10 46 Vs Moyston 4 3 27
- 1923 Ararat Imperials 7 5 47 Vs Cathcart 4 5 29
- 1924 Ararat Imperials 7 8 50 Vs Maroona 5 10 40
- 1925 Willaura 8 8 56 Vs Cathcart 4 6 30
- 1926 Willaura 10 15 75 Vs Cathcart 8 5 53
- 1927 Dobie 8 15 63 Vs A Imperials 5 10 40
- 1928 St Marys 8 2 50 Vs Trinity 6 4 40
- 1929 Trinity 9 12 66 Vs St Marys 7 14 56
- 1930 Trinity 6 5 41 Vs St Andrews 4 9 33
- 1931 St Andrews 11 13 79 Vs Trinity 8 8 56
- 1932 Trinity 7 5 47 Vs Moyston 5 7 37
- 1933 St Andrews 9 15 69 Vs Methodists 6 9 45
- 1934 Methodists 9 16 70 Vs Trinity 5 8 38
- 1935 Methodists 12 12 84 Vs Trinity 10 8 68
- 1936 Trinity 12 11 83 Vs Methodists 7 9 51
- 1937 Methodists 9 16 70 Vs Trinity 7 9 51
- 1938 Methodists 12 11 83 Vs Great Western 3 17 35
- 1939 Joel Joel 9 15 69 Vs Methodists 6 7 43
- 1940 Warriors 15 8 98 Vs St Marys 11 9 75
- 1946 St Marys 12 14 86 Vs Ararat Ex-students 10 9 69
- 1947 Trinity 11 10 76 Vs Methodists 7 9 51
- 1948 Trinity 11 9 75 Vs Prestige 7 15 57
- 1949 Methodists 13 7 85 Vs St Marys 8 7 55
- 1950 St Andrews 12 11 83 Vs Methodists 7 6 48
- 1951 Prestige 10 11 71 Vs Methodists 3 9 27
- 1952 St Marys 12 17 89 Vs Trinity 10 8 68
- 1953 St Marys 6 11 47 Vs Caledonians 6 8 44
- 1954 Caledonians 7 14 56 Vs St Marys 6 9 45
- 1955 Caledonians 8 14 62 Vs Prestige 8 3 51
- 1956 Prestige 10 9 69 Vs Caledonians 6 9 45
- 1957 Caledonians 9 11 65 Vs St Marys 7 12 54
- 1958 Methodists 9 8 62 Vs Great Western 8 5 53
- 1959 Methodists 9 10 64 Vs Caledonians 8 8 56
- 1960 Landsborough 13 14 92 Vs Caledonians 2 3 15
- 1961 Landsborough 13 10 88 Vs Great Western 6 12 48
- 1962 Great Western 12 10 82 Vs Landsborough 8 12 60
- 1963 Trinity 6 13 49 Vs Great Western 5 7 37
- 1964 Trinity 5 6 36 Vs Great Western 3 12 30
- 1965 Trinity 13 10 88 Vs Moyston 8 14 62
- 1966 Prestige 10 12 72 Vs Trinity 7 10 52
- 1967 Moyston 14 12 96 Vs St Marys 11 6 72
- 1968 Moyston 11 12 78 Vs St Marys 6 16 52
- 1969 Moyston 15 10 100 Vs St Marys 15 9 99
- 1970 St Marys 18 9 117 Vs Great Western 7 10 52
- 1971 St Marys 9 14 68 Vs Great Western 7 3 45
- 1972 Great Western 14 13 97 Vs Methodists 11 15 81
- 1973 Miners 19 16 130 Vs Great Western 10 7 67
- 1974 Miners 10 12 72 Vs Caledonians 10 11 71
- 1975 Caledonians 13 28 106 Vs Miners 8 10 58
- 1976 Miners 12 13 85 Vs Swifts 11 7 73
- 1977 Swifts 15 14 104 Vs Miners 10 8 68
- 1978 Warriors 8 14 62 Vs Moyston 4 10 34
- 1979 Trinity 16 7 103 Vs St Marys 7 11 53
- 1980 Warriors 11 9 75 Vs Caledonians 8 9 57
- 1981 Warriors 18 23 131 Vs St Marys 13 12 90
- 1982 Warriors 18 13 121 Vs St Marys 16 12 108
- 1983 Great Western 11 10 76 Vs Warriors 5 9 39
- 1984 Warriors 11 15 81 Vs Miners 11 9 75
- 1985 Caledonians 20 6 126 Vs Great Western 13 19 97
- 1986 Caledonians 15 12 102 Vs St Marys 13 9 87
- 1987 Caledonians 19 10 124 Vs Trinity 13 19 97
- 1988 Prestige 7 10 52 Vs Caledonians 6 10 46
- 1989 Swifts 14 7 91 Vs Moyston 13 9 87
- 1990 Moyston 14 19 103 Vs Warriors 10 14 74
- 1991 Moyston 15 9 99 Vs St Marys 12 6 78
- 1992 St Marys 11 13 79 Vs Caledonians 8 7 55
- 1993 Swifts 17 9 111 Vs St Marys 7 10 52
- 1994 Swifts 15 8 98 Vs Warriors 14 3 87
- 1995 Warriors 18 8 116 Vs St Marys 8 13 61
- 1996 Warriors 15 10 100 Vs Caledonians-Miners 11 10 76
- 1997 St Marys 25 12 162 Vs Great Western 11 4 70
- 1998 St Marys 13 10 88 Vs Great Western 10 9 69
- 1999 Caledonians-Miners 12 13 85 Vs Prestige-Trinity 6 11 47

=== League Best & Fairest ===
Year	Player	Club
1950	Eric James	Trinity
1951	Reg Bates	Methodists
1952	Leon Gibson	Landsborough
1953	Alan Grant	Methodists
1954	Max Curran	Great Western
1955	Les Lugg	St Marys
1956	Bruce Dickerson	Moyston
1957	Henry Gunstone	Great Western
1958	Leo Kranz	Buangor
1959	Bruce Graham	Prestige
1960	Neil Fenton	Trinity
1961	Peter Stainsby	Prestige
	Stuart Robertson	Landsborough
1962	Barry Smart	Trinity
1963	Barry Smart	Trinity
1964	Ivan Dunne	St Marys
1965	Doug Bullen	Prestige
1966	Les Peoples	St Marys
1967	Alan Smith	Methodists
1968	George Dunn	Methodists
1969	Terry Davis	St Marys
1970	Victor Barwick	Prestige
1971	Peter Kaczynski	Moyston
1972	Graeme Trickey	Halls Gap
1973	Kevin Westrup	St Marys
1974	Robert Wilson	Moyston
1975	Lex Pritchard	Caledonians
1976	Ross Jackson	Warriors
1977	Terry Brady	Great Western
1978	Wilf Dickeson	Great Western
1979	Leo Mooney	Great Western
1980	Ian Brilliant	Warriors
1981	Peter Cordy	Great Western
1982	Ralph Tulloch	Swifts
1983	Gary Todd	Moyston
1984	Peter Cody	Great Western
1985	Des Beaton	Warriors
1986	Brian Jenkins	Prestige
1987	Brian Jenkins	Prestige
1988	John Coole	Prestige
1989	Glen Joiner	Swifts
1990	Darren Austin	Warriors
1991	Tim Purbrick	St Marys
	Anthony Redford	Swifts
1992	Anthony Harrington	Caledonians
1993	Andrew Taylor	Swifts
1994	Peter Scott	Miners
1995	Shane Allgood	Caledonians
	Noel Jacobs	Warriors
1996	Rohan May	St Marys
	Casper Cossan	Warriors
1997	Noel Jacobs	St Marys
1998	Matt Jackson	Caledonians-Miners
1999	Dale Bligh	Great Western

=== Leading Goal Kickers ===
Year	Player	H&A goals	Finals goals	Total Goals
1940	Gerald Lillis (St Marys)	0	0	0
1953	B Carroll (St Marys)	0	0	0
1954	-	0	0	0
1955	-	0	0	0
1956	Alan Fiscalini (Prestige)	58	3	61
1957	-	0	0	0
1958	-	0	0	0
1959	R Hellyer (Caledonians)	44	5	49
1960	J Sandlant (Landsborough)	47	4	51
1961	Stewart Robertson (Landsborough)	60	3	63
1962	K McKinnis (Moyston)	35	0	35
1963	Fred Locke (Trinity)	58	7	65
1964	-	0	0	0
1965	-	0	0	0
1966	Gary Studd (Prestege)	52	2	54
1967	Gerard Brennan (St Marys)	66	2	68
1968	John Pola (Moyston)	38	7	45
1969	John Pola (Moyston)	31	10	41
1970	Don Sladdin (St Marys)	67	5	72
1971	Don Sladdin (St Marys)	67	8	75
1972	Russell Smyth (Methodists)	84	7	91
1973	David Watson (Caledonians)	68	4	72
1974	Warren Grant (Miners)	85	14	99
1975	Donny Aldersea (Caledonians)	139	16	155
1976	Warren Grant (Miners)	75	10	85
1977	Howard Dunn (Swifts)	58	12	70
1978	Bill Van Der Waal (Warriors)	76	13	89
1979	Leo Mooney (Prestige)	49	0	49
1980	Bill Van Der Waal (Warriors)	68	19	87
1981	Bill Van Der Waal (Warriors)	76	0	76
1982	Graeme Sladdin (St Marys)	126	8	134
1983	Wanye Ford (PrestIge)	109	0	109
1984	Les Brennan (Miners)	96	11	107
1985	Terry Croton (Great Western)	90	18	108
1986	Graeme Sladdin (St Marys)	79	14	93
1987	Darren Borelli (Trinity)	73	5	78
1988	Les Brennan (Caledonians)	0	102	102
1989	Craig Marrow (Warriors)	64	3	67
1990	Mimi Michael (Moyston)	96	19	115
1991	Mimi Michael (Moyston)	102	6	108
1992	Mimi Michael (Moyston)	73	11	84
1993	Dan Grainger (Swifts)	86	7	93
1994	Tim Williams (Warriors)	94	13	107
1995	David Fratin (St Marys)	104	6	110
1996	Graeme Nuske (Swifts)	62	0	62
1997	Tim Williams (Warriors)	63	5	68
1998	Paul Kinna (Great Western)	139	10	149
1999	Leigh Jenkins (Prestige-Trinity)	88	5	93

== VFL/AFL Players From ADFA ==
Caledonians

- Lex Pritchard - Collingwood

Great Western

- Roy West - Geelong

Miners

- Doug Tassell - Essendon

St Marys

- Daryl Peoples - Fitzroy
- Terry Gleeson - Melbourne
