= Stawell Football Club =

Stawell FNC Inc.

Names
- Full name: Stawell Football Netball Club Inc
- Nickname: Warriors

Club details
- Founded: 1874
- Colours: Black Red
- Competition: Wimmera Football League
- Premierships: 8 (1939, 1940, 1948, 1950, 1978, 1987, 1995, 2000)
- Ground: Central Park

The Stawell Football Club is an Australian rules football club which competes in the Wimmera Football League (WFL). It is based in the town of Stawell, Victoria.

== History ==
Stawell FC have been playing in the Wimmera Football League since 1937.

In 1998 they merged with the Stawell Warriors Football Club, Before the merger, Stawell were nicknamed the Redlegs.

== Stawell Warriors FC ==
The Warriors and Stawell Swifts both came into being in 1926 when the Stawell Junior Football Club was split into two. The two clubs were part of the Stawell DFA that was a forerunner to the South Wimmera Football League that commenced in 1929.

Both teams commenced in the Ararat & District Football Association (ADFA) in 1970 after their previous competition disbanded at the end of 1969.

The Warriors were blocked by the ADFA from merging with Stawell so they took the drastic step of disbanding. Stawell absorbed the remnants of the Warriors club.

Football Premierships

- South Wimmera Football League - Seniors
  - 1932, 1933, 1934, 1939, 1946, 1947, 1948, 1954, 1955, 1961, 1965, 1968
- Ararat & District Football Association - Seniors
  - 1978, 1981, 1982, 1984, 1995, 1996

== Stawell FC (Redlegs) ==
Football Premierships
Seniors

- Sprague Cup
  - 1888, 1889
- Marchant Cup
  - 1902
- Wimmera Football League
  - 1939, 1940, 1948, 1950, 1978, 1987, 1995, 2000

Reserves

- Wimmera Football League
  - 1995, 2007, 2008, 2009, 2010, 2016

Thirds

- Wimmera Football League
  - 1977, 1980, 1984, 1989, 1994, 1995, 1997, 2001, 2002

== League best & fairest ==
Wimmera Football League

Senior Football

Stan P Freeland Medal

- 1932 - Horrie Hunt
- 1933 - Bill Earle

Toohey Medal

- 1951 - Geoff Stewart
- 1969 - Mike Pickering
- 1980, 1981, 1983, 1986, 1987 - Tony Beck
- 1994 - Simon Sutterby
- 2000 - Matt Ilsley
- 2007 - Brent Tuckey

Reserves

- 1975 - Steven Potter
- 1978 - Ian Potter
- 1994 - Des Beaton
- 1995 - Bill Norton
- 2016 - Nathan Sabbo
- 2017 - Shane Field

Thirds

- ?

== VFL / AFL Players ==
VFL/AFL footballers recruited from Stawell include -

- 1905 - Joe Wearmouth: St Kilda
- 1908 - Bob Northey - St Kilda
- 1909 - Percy Sparks - Richmond
- 1927 - Arthur Hart - St Kilda
- 1928 - Len Clearson - Geelong
- 1928 - Charlie Fowler - Geelong
- 1930 - Lloyd Jones - St Kilda
- 1932 - Bill Earle - Melbourne
- 1932 - Denis McKey - St Kilda
- 1932 - Johnny Walker - Essendon
- 1944 - George Grainger - St Kilda
- 1945 - Ray Potter - Richmond
- 1961 - Michael Pickering – North Melbourne
- 1961 - Roy West: Geelong
- 1962 - Ken Beck - Hawthorn
- 1963 - Noel Raitt - Essendon
- 1966 - Allan Hird Jr. – Essendon
- 1970 - Gary Grainger: Essendon
- 1970 - Greg Perry - Essendon
- 1976 - Chris Perry - Collingwood
- 1989 - Liam Pickering – North Melbourne, Geelong
- 1994 - Craig Ellis – North Melbourne, Western Bulldogs, Melbourne
- 1998 - Brent Tuckey – Collingwood, West Coast
- 2009 - Matt Austin - Brisbane

The following footballers played senior VFL / AFL football prior to playing and / or coaching with Stawell with the year indicating their first season at SFNC.

- 1913 - Jim Toohey Snr: Fitzroy
- 1922 - Bill Twomey Sr. - Collingwood
- 1925 - Bill Walton: Collingwood
- 1926 - Jack Bisset: South Melbourne
- 1927 - Bert McComb: Hawthorn
- 1932 - Gladstone "Ted" Power: South Melbourne
- 1938 - Les Hughson: Fitzroy
- 1948 - Percy Bushby: Essendon
- 1948 - Neil Jeffrey: North Melbourne
- 1949 - Ted Ryan: Collingwood
- 1953 - Bill Snell: Essendon
- 1954 - Alan Bulman: Footscray
- 1957 - Bill Smeaton: Melbourne
- 1965 - John Kennedy: Hawthorn
- 1967 - Des Dickson: Hawthorn
- 1970 - Colin Eales: Geelong

== Links ==
- 1923 - Wimmera FA Runners Up: Stawell FC team photo
- 1924 - Stawell FC Ladies Committee photo
- 1925 - Stawell FC Ladies Committee photo
- 1925 - Horsham FC & Stawell FC team photos
- 1926 - Stawell FC & Horsham FC team photos
- 1926 - Wimmera FL 2nd Semi Final teams: Nhill FC & Stawell FC team photos
- 1926 - Wimmera FL Premiers (Stawell FC) & Runners Up (Warracknabeal FC) team photos
- 1927 - Rupanyup FC & Stawell FC team photos
- 1929 - Stawell FC & Nhill FC action photos
- 1929 - Stawell FC team photo
- 1930 - Wimmera FL Premiers (Stawell FC) & Runners Up (Dimboola FC) team photos
- 1931 - Wimmera FL: Stawell FC & Murtoa FC team photos
- 1932 - Stawell FC & Warracknabeal FC team photos
- 1934 - Ararat FC & Stawell FC team photos
- 1937 - Stawell FC & Ararat FC team photos
- 1937 - Wimmera FL Premiers (Dimboola FC) & Runners Up (Stawell FC) team photos
- 1938 - Wimmera FL Preliminary Final team photos (Stawell FC & Jeparit FC)
- 1946 - Ararat FC & Stawell FC team photos
- 1954 - Stawell FC Bathing Girls photo
