= James Toohey =

James Toohey or Jim Toohey may refer to:

- James Toohey (New South Wales politician) (1850–1895), New South Wales politician and brewer, co-founder of Tooheys Brewery
- Jim Toohey Sr. (1886–1980), Australian rules footballer with Fitzroy and North Fremantle
- Jim Toohey Jr. (1915–2004), Australian rules footballer with Fitzroy and Perth
- Jim Toohey (politician) (1909–1992), Australian senator for South Australia
- James Toohey (prospector) (1827–1883), Irish-Australian land owner of the early colony of Brisbane
