= Rex Byrne =

Australian rules footballer, born 1906

Personal information
- Full name: Walter Rex Byrne
- Born: 8 December 1906; Nhill, Victoria
- Died: 23 May 1971 (aged 64); Mount Richmond, Victoria
- Original teams: Police (Wednesday league), Mildura
- Height: 180 cm (5 ft 11 in)
- Weight: 83 kg (183 lb)

Playing career^{1}
Years	Club	Games (Goals)
1928	Northcote (VFA)	2 (2)
1930	Williamstown (VFA)	5 (9)
1931–33	Northcote (VFA)	38 (27)
1934	Fitzroy	2 (0)
- ^{1} Playing statistics correct to the end of 1934.

Walter Rex Byrne (8 December 1906 – 23 May 1971) was an Australian rules footballer who played with Fitzroy in the Victorian Football League (VFL).

Before landing at Fitzroy, Byrne played at Northcote, Mildura, Williamstown and Northcote again. After captain-coaching Mildura for the first part of 1930, Byrne was transferred back to Melbourne in his job with Victoria Police and joined his brother, Tom Byrne, at Williamstown for the rest of the 1930 season. He played eight games with 'Town, kicking eight goals before returning to Northcote in 1931.

== Family ==
The son of John Byrne (1864 – 1955) and Phyllis Hannah Byrne, née Nattrass (1871 – 1950), Walter Rex Byrne was born at the western Victorian town of Nhill on 8 December 1906.

He was the brother of Fitzroy player Alex Byrne and Carlton, Hawthorn and Williamstown player Tom Byrne.
