= Alex Byrne (Australian footballer) =

Australian rules footballer

Personal information
- Full name: Alexander Stanley Byrne
- Born: 21 May 1904; Nhill, Victoria
- Died: 23 August 1975 (aged 71); Kalangadoo, South Australia
- Original team: Penola
- Height: 191 cm (6 ft 3 in)
- Weight: 96 kg (212 lb)

Playing career^{1}
Years	Club	Games (Goals)
1929	Fitzroy	1 (0)
- ^{1} Playing statistics correct to the end of 1929.

Alexander Stanley Byrne (21 May 1904 – 23 August 1975) was an Australian rules footballer who played for the Fitzroy Football Club in the Victorian Football League (VFL).

== Family ==
The son of John Byrne (1864 – 1955) and Phyllis Hannah Byrne, née Nattrass (1871 – 1950), Alexander Stanley Byrne was born at the western Victorian town of Nhill on 21 May 1904.

He was the older brother of both Fitzroy player Rex Byrne and Carlton and Hawthorn player Tom Byrne.

== War service ==
Byrne later served as a gunner in an Anti Aircraft Regiment of the Australian Army during World War II.
