= Jack Toohey =

Jack Toohey may refer to:

- Jack Toohey (footballer) (1925–2010), Australian rules footballer
- Jack Toohey (rugby league), Australian rugby league footballer who played in the 1910s and 1920s
