= Michael Pickering =

Michael Pickering may refer to:

- Michael Pickering (footballer, born 1941) (1941–1995), Australian rules footballer for North Melbourne
- Michael Pickering (footballer, born 1963), former Australian rules footballer for Richmond and Melbourne
- Mick Pickering (born 1956), English association footballer in the 1970s and 1980s
- Mike Pickering (born 1958), English musician who founded Quando Quango and M People
