= Des Dickson =

Des Dickson may refer to:

- Des Dickson (Australian footballer) (born 1941), Australian rules footballer
- Des Dickson (footballer, born 1948), Northern Irish footballer and manager
