= Joe Wearmouth =

Australian rules footballer

Personal information
- Full name: Joseph Wearmouth
- Born: 4 June 1878; Pleasant Creek, Victoria
- Died: 1 June 1925 (aged 46); Ashfield, New South Wales
- Original team: Stawell

Playing career^{1}
Years	Club	Games (Goals)
1905	St Kilda	2 (0)
- ^{1} Playing statistics correct to the end of 1905.

Joseph Wearmouth (4 June 1878 – 1 June 1925) was an Australian rules footballer who played with St Kilda in the Victorian Football League (VFL).
