= Len Clearson =

Australian rules footballer, born 1901

Personal information
- Full name: Len Clearson
- Born: 7 March 1901
- Died: 20 October 1984 (aged 83)
- Original team: Stawell

Playing career^{1}
Years	Club	Games (Goals)
1928	Geelong	4 (2)
- ^{1} Playing statistics correct to the end of 1928.

Len Clearson (7 March 1901 – 20 October 1984) was an Australian rules footballer who played with Geelong in the Victorian Football League (VFL).
