= Neil Jeffrey =

Australian rules footballer, born 1916

Personal information
- Full name: Neil Leslie Joseph Jeffrey
- Born: 13 May 1916; Kensington, Victoria
- Died: 6 July 2005 (aged 89)
- Height: 184 cm (6 ft 0 in)
- Weight: 76 kg (168 lb)

Playing career^{1}
Years	Club	Games (Goals)
1939	North Melbourne	6 (2)
- ^{1} Playing statistics correct to the end of 1939.

Neil Leslie Joseph Jeffrey (13 May 1916 – 6 July 2005) was an Australian rules footballer who played with North Melbourne in the Victorian Football League (VFL).

Captain-coach of Stawell's 1948 Wimmera Football League's premiership team.
