= Brent Tuckey =

Australian rules footballer (born 1979)

Personal information
- Born: 27 August 1979 (age 47)
- Original team: Stawell / Ballarat U18
- Debut: 25 July 1998, Collingwood vs. West Coast, at Victoria Park

Playing career^{1}
Years	Club	Games (Goals)
1998–2001	Collingwood	19 (8)
2002	West Coast	3 (1)
Total		22 (9)
- ^{1} Playing statistics correct to the end of 2002.

Brent Tuckey (born 27 August 1979) is a former Australian rules footballer who played for Collingwood and West Coast in the Australian Football League (AFL).

Brent Tuckey was drafted to the Collingwood Football Club in the 1996 National Draft as a 17-year-old, with pick 19. He was unable to break into the line up in his debut year and in 1998 he made his debut late in the season, played only three games. In 1999 he was to have yet another disappointing year in the seniors, managing only seven games, and his potential and high-flying was the only thing keeping him at the club. He played eight games in 2000 and kicked six goals, used as a centre half-forward. In 2001 Tuckey would continue his inconsistency and lack of form in the reserves, and manage only one game for the year before being delisted.

The West Coast Eagles would draft him as a rookie and Tuckey would play three games, including the round 2 clash against his former club.

During his time with the Eagles he played many games for East Perth in the West Australian Football League (WAFL) when not required. He played in their 2002 premiership side and joined them for the 2003 season after being delisted from the AFL. In total he played 34 games for the club.

He later played for South Adelaide in the South Australian National Football League (SANFL) before returning to Victoria to play from the Stawell Warriors in the Wimmera Football League. Following his successful stint for the Warriors back in his home town, Tuckey won the 2007 Wimmera Football League best and award, the Toohey Medal.
