= Greg Perry (footballer) =

Australian rules footballer

Personal information
- Full name: Greg Perry
- Born: 29 January 1949 (age 77)
- Original team: Stawell
- Height: 193 cm (6 ft 4 in)
- Weight: 87 kg (192 lb)
- Position: Ruck

Playing career^{1}
Years	Club	Games (Goals)
1970, 1972–74, 1976	Essendon	63 (38)
- ^{1} Playing statistics correct to the end of 1976.

Greg Perry (born 29 January 1949) is a former Australian rules footballer who played with Essendon in the Victorian Football League (VFL).
