= Ted Bourke =

Australian rules footballer, born 1904

Personal information
- Full name: Edward Arthur Bourke
- Born: 17 February 1904; Yarrawonga, Victoria
- Died: 27 November 1952 (aged 48); Seddon, Victoria
- Original teams: Muckatah, Tungamah, Brunswick
- Height: 185 cm (6 ft 1 in)
- Weight: 80 kg (176 lb)
- Position: Defender

Playing career^{1}
Years	Club	Games (Goals)
1924–26	Richmond	32 (15)
1926	Brunswick	6 (2)
1927	South Melbourne	6 (1)
1929-32	Sandringham	72 (19)
1933	Yarraville	22 (3)
1934	Ararat	? (?)
1935	South Ballarat	? (?)
1936	McKinnon	? (?)
Total		138 (40)
- ^{1} Playing statistics correct to the end of 1927.

Career highlights
- VFA Recorder Cup: 1929; BWFL best & fairest: 1934; McKinnon FC Premiership captain-coach: 1936

Edward Arthur Bourke (17 February 1904 – 27 November 1952) was an Australian rules footballer who played for Richmond and South Melbourne in the Victorian Football League (VFL) during the 1920s.

== Family ==
The eldest of the seven children of Edward Arthur Bourke (1877-1936), and Ellen Mary Bourke (1879-1949), née Lonergan, Edward Arthur Bourke was born at Yarrawonga, Victoria on 17 February 1904.

He married Violet Elizabeth Gould (1904-1936) in 1926; they had four children. He married Lilian Grace Taylor (1916-1989) in 1941; they had three children.

== Football ==
Often playing at centre half back, Bourke spent his early football years with Muckatah, Tungamah and Brunswick.

He kicked three goals on debut for Richmond in the opening round of the 1924 VFL season and participated in the round robin finals series which took place that year.

After crossing to South Melbourne without success in 1927, Bourke missed the entire 1928 football season while he waited for a clearance to the Victorian Football Association. He was signed by Sandringham in 1929 and won the Recorder Cup in his first season.

Bourke coached Bentleigh to the 1930 Metropolitan C. Section Amateur premiership.

Bourke later served as captain-coach of Yarraville in 1933 and Ararat in 1934.

Bourke won the 1934 - Ballarat - Wimmera Football League best and fairest award, the George McKenzie Gold Medal.

Bourke was cleared from South Ballarat to McKinnon in May 1936, where McKinnon won the 1936 premiership of the Caulfield Oakleigh District Football League.

== Death ==
He died at his residence in Seddon, Victoria on 27 November 1952.
