= Barry Grinter =

Australian rules footballer and coach

Personal information
- Full name: Barry W. Grinter
- Born: 1 October 1951 (age 75)
- Original team: Ararat (WFL)
- Height: 191 cm (6 ft 3 in)
- Weight: 97 kg (214 lb)
- Position: Ruckman / Defender

Playing career^{1}
| Years | Club | Games (Goals) |
| 1971–72, 1974–76 | Essendon | 78 (7) |
| 1978 | Richmond | 6 (0) |
| Total | | 84 (7) |
- ^{1} Playing statistics correct to the end of 1978.

Barry W. Grinter (born 1 October 1951) is a former Australian rules footballer who played with Essendon and Richmond in the Victorian Football League (VFL) during the 1970s.

Grinter played most of his football either as a ruckman or defender. A left-footed player, he was recruited to Essendon from Ararat. From 1974 to 1976, Grinter put together 46 consecutive games and was the runner-up in Essendon's 1975 'Best and Fairest' award. The following year he was the club's equal third best performer in the Brownlow Medal count.

After a season as captain-coach of Hobart in 1977, Grinter resumed his VFL career at Richmond but could only manage six appearances. He went on to coach Queensland Australian Football League (QAFL) club Windsor-Zillmere from 1983 to 1984. Also coached Nambour Football club in 1981/82.
