= Liam Pickering =

Australian rules footballer (born 1968)

Personal information
- Full name: Liam Michael Pickering
- Born: 9 September 1968 (age 58); Stawell, Victoria
- Original team: Stawell
- Draft: No. 48, 1987 national draft
- Height: 184 cm (6 ft 0 in)
- Weight: 85 kg (187 lb)

Playing career^{1}
Years	Club	Games (Goals)
1989–1992	North Melbourne	22 (8)
1993–1999	Geelong	102 (46)
Total		124 (54)
- ^{1} Playing statistics correct to the end of 1999.

Liam Michael Pickering (born 9 September 1968) is a former professional Australian rules footballer who played for the North Melbourne Football Club and the Geelong Football Club in the Australian Football League (AFL).

His father, Michael Pickering, also played for North Melbourne.

== Sporting career ==
He played 22 games with North Melbourne from 1989 to 1992, and 102 games with Geelong from 1993 to 1999, before his retirement from AFL football. Pickering won the club best & fairest award in 1997.

He was also a talented cricketer who played 171 matches for North Melbourne Cricket Club in the Victorian Premier Cricket competition.

== Media and managing careers ==
Pickering is a well-known player agent.

He is currently a co-host of a Saturday-morning radio show with Craig Hutchison called Off the Bench on Melbourne station SEN 1116.
