= Henry Thomson (footballer) =

Australian rules footballer

Personal information
- Full name: Griffith Henry Thomson
- Born: 6 October 1906; Carisbrook, Victoria
- Died: 21 May 1943 (aged 36); Burma-Siam Railway, Burma
- Original team: Ararat

Playing career^{1}
Years	Club	Games (Goals)
1930	Carlton	1 (0)
- ^{1} Playing statistics correct to the end of 1930.

Griffith Henry Thomson (6 October 1906 – 21 May 1943) was an Australian rules footballer who played with Carlton in the Victorian Football League (VFL).

== Family ==
The son of Rasmus Thomson (1861–1945) and Jessie Thomson (1873–938), née Thomas, he was born on 6 October 1906.

== Military service ==
He volunteered for service soon after Australia's declaration of war against Germany, and was moved to Batavia. While posted there with the Royal Australian Army Pay Corps, he was captured in 1942 as the Japanese army moved south.

He was put to work on the Burma-Siam Railway, and died while working on the railway in May 1943.

He was later buried at Thanbyuzayat War Cemetery.

== See also ==
- List of Victorian Football League players who died on active service
