= Chris Dalkin =

Australian rules footballer and cricketer

Personal information
- Full name: Christopher R. Dalkin
- Born: 3 March 1962 (age 64)
- Original team: Ararat (WFL)
- Height: 191 cm (6 ft 3 in)
- Weight: 80 kg (176 lb)

Playing career^{1}
Years	Club	Games (Goals)
1982–1985	Collingwood (VFL)	18 (12)
1987	Port Adelaide (SANFL)	8 (8)
Total		26 (20)
- ^{1} Playing statistics correct to the end of 1987.

Chris Dalkin (born 3 March 1962) is a former Australian rules footballer who played with Collingwood in the Victorian Football League (VFL). He was also a cricketer and represented the Australia Under-19 cricket team.

Dalkin toured Pakistan with Under 19s in 1981 and played in three "Tests". A right-arm fast-medium bowler, Dalkin took 5/90 in Pakistan's first innings at Gaddafi Stadium in Lahore. His wickets included Saleem Malik and Rameez Raja. He started the series as a number 11 batsman, but after the left hander played a couple of impressive innings he was promoted to seven in the batting order at Hyderabad and scored a half-century.

Dalkin's football career began at Wimmera Football League (WFL) club Ararat, from where he came to Collingwood. Dalkin made 10 league appearances in the 1982 VFL season, five in 1983, none in 1984 and a further three in 1985. After leaving Collingwood he played briefly with South Australian National Football League (SANFL) club Port Adelaide.
