= Michael Pickering (footballer, born 1941) =

Australian rules footballer

Personal information
- Full name: Michael Francis Pickering
- Born: 24 November 1941; Canberra, Australia
- Died: 5 January 1995 (aged 53)
- Original team: Stawell (SWFL)
- Height: 192 cm (6 ft 4 in)
- Weight: 83 kg (183 lb)

Playing career^{1}
Years	Club	Games (Goals)
1961–1962	North Melbourne	6 (8)
- ^{1} Playing statistics correct to the end of 1962.

Michael Francis Pickering (24 November 1941 – 5 January 1995) was an Australian rules footballer who played with North Melbourne in the Victorian Football League (VFL).

== Early life and family ==
Pickering was the son of Wally Pickering, who was a legendary forward for Stawell. Wally Pickering played in the club's inaugural Wimmera Football League premiership in 1939.

From 1956 to 1959, Pickering went to St Patrick's College, Ballarat.

== Football career ==
Pickering, a ruckman from Stawell, was sought by both Essendon and North Melbourne. Secured by the latter, Pickering made three appearances early in the 1961 VFL season, before he was sidelined with an ankle injury and then a dislocated elbow, which ended his season. It wasn't until the 16th round of the 1962 season that he returned to senior football, a game against Melbourne at Arden Street Oval, in which he kicked three goals. The following round, at Kardinia Park, he kicked another three goals, from a forward pocket. His next appearance, in round 18, would be his last for North Melbourne.

He decided to return to Stawell in 1963 and remained with the club for many years, finishing his Wimmera career with 220 games and three club best and fairest awards. In 1969 he was the joint leading vote getter in the Toohey Medal, with Nhill's Rod Coutts, but lost on countback. The league decided in 2003 to award retrospective medals to all players who finished second on countback, which included Pickering. His son, Liam Pickering, a former North Melbourne and Geelong footballer, collected the award on behalf of his father, who died in 1995.
