= Bert McComb =

Australian rules footballer

Personal information
- Full name: Albert Thomas McComb
- Born: 27 September 1906; Frankston, Victoria
- Died: 24 December 1981 (aged 75); Frankston, Victoria
- Original team: Frankston
- Height: 180 cm (5 ft 11 in)
- Weight: 81 kg (179 lb)

Playing career^{1}
Years	Club	Games (Goals)
1925	Essendon	3 (1)
1925; 1928–1929	Hawthorn	18 (2)
Total		21 (3)
- ^{1} Playing statistics correct to the end of 1929.

Albert Thomas McComb (27 September 1906 – 24 December 1981) was an Australian rules footballer who played with Essendon and Hawthorn in the Victorian Football League (VFL).

== Family ==
The son of Edmund Kerr McComb (1873–1957) and Sarah Ann McComb, nee Bedford (1878–1973), Albert Thomas McComb was born at Frankston on 27 September 1906.

== Football ==
=== Essendon ===
After commencing his career with Frankston, McComb trialled with Essendon at the start of the 1924 VFL season before joining them in 1925. He played the first three games of the season but was then dropped.

=== Hawthorn ===
Halfway through the 1925 season McComb secured a clearance to Hawthorn and he made three appearances for them in the second half of the season.

=== Frankston ===
McComb commenced the 1926 season with Hawthorn but was cleared back to Frankston without making a senior appearance.

=== Stawell ===
In 1927 he again commenced the season with Hawthorn but after failing to make the team was cleared to Stawell Football Club in June.

=== Hawthorn ===
McComb again returned to Hawthorn for the 1928 VFL season and he made a further 15 appearances over two seasons.

=== Frankston ===
He then returned to Frankston for the 1930 season where he both played and coached for several years.

=== Port Campbell ===
McComb was captain coach of Port Campbell from 1936 to 1939, leading them to premierships in his first two seasons with the club.

== Later life ==
In 1941 Albert McComb married Enid Ethel Langham and they lived in Kew while he worked at the Australian Paper Mills in Fairfield.

McComb also served in the Australian Army for 18 months during World War II.

After his retirement the McCombs moved to Frankston, where they lived until his death in 1981. Albert McComb is buried with his wife at Frankston Cemetery.
