= Johnny Walker (Australian footballer) =

Australian rules footballer

Personal information
- Full name: Edgar John Walker
- Born: 14 November 1908; Stawell, Victoria
- Died: 2 February 1980 (aged 71); Surrey Hills, Victoria
- Original team: Stawell
- Height: 178 cm (5 ft 10 in)
- Weight: 79 kg (174 lb)
- Position: half-back flank

Playing career^{1}
Years	Club	Games (Goals)
1932–1934	Essendon	27 (7)
- ^{1} Playing statistics correct to the end of 1934.

Edgar John Walker (14 November 1908 – 2 February 1980) was an Australian rules footballer who played with Essendon in the Victorian Football League (VFL).

== Family ==
The son of Edgar Heal (1880-1943) and Alberta Amelia Walker (1888-1954), later Mrs. Francis Field Boothey, Edgar John Walker was born at Stawell, Victoria on 14 November 1908.

He married Alma Hannah Hall (1907-1993) in 1934. They had two children.

== Football ==
=== Essendon (VFL) ===
Cleared to Essendon from Stawell in April 1932, he played in the last seven games of the First XVIII's 1932 home-and-away season, in all but one of the eighteen games of the 1933 home-and-away season. and in two of the first four games of the 1934 home-and-away season, In his last senior match, against Hawthorn, at Windy Hill, on 26 May 1934, selected at centre half-forward, he failed to score.

=== Camberwell (VFA) ===
Cleared from Essendon to Camberwell in June 1934, he played in 67 matches and kicked 6 goals over 5 seasons (1934 to 1938).

== Military service ==
Walker later served in the Australian Army during World War II.

== Death ==
He died at his Surrey Hills residence (after a short illness) on 2 February 1980.
