= Gary Grainger (footballer) =

Australian rules footballer

Personal information
- Full name: Gary Allan Grainger
- Nickname: Bronco
- Born: 24 September 1949 (age 77); Stawell, Victoria
- Original teams: Stawell and Lalor Football Club
- Height: 191 cm (6 ft 3 in)
- Weight: 90 kg (198 lb)
- Positions: Ruckman, forward

Playing career^{1}
Years	Club	Games (Goals)
1970–72	Essendon	30 (19)
- ^{1} Playing statistics correct to the end of 1972.

Gary Grainger (born 24 September 1949) is a former Australian rules footballer who played with Essendon in the Victorian Football League (VFL). His father, George, also played VFL football, for St Kilda. After leaving Essendon, Grainger played for and captained Preston in the Victorian Football Association (VFA), was captain-coach of Tasmanian side East Devonport, captain-coached Epping back in Victoria, and was captain-coach of Lalor in the Diamond Valley Football League.

"Gary “Bronco” Grainger was a ruckman and forward who came from Stawell where he had played from late 1966 to 1969. He was a fine mark but had trouble keeping a regular senior spot. He kicked two goals on debut in Round 1, 1970, against Carlton in an away loss. He played 14 games in his debut season. Grainger managed only 11 games in 1971 but finished with the best team man award that year. He found it hard to get regular first team selection and after five games in 1972 he left Essendon. He joined Preston in 1973 where he remained until 1976, his final season as captain. Grainger then became captain-coach of East Devonport in Tasmania in 1977 and 1978 and then captain-coach of Epping in 1979. He was with Lalor from 1980 to 1984 and was that club's captain-coach in 1981. He also represented the Diamond Valley League in that year. Grainger's father, George, played two games for St Kilda in 1944. Gary's two Sons Dean Grainger and Scott Grainger were drafted as well, Scott being drafted to Hawthorn and Dean being Drafted to Fremantle." (https://australianfootball.com/players/player/gary%2Bgrainger/10310)
