= Bill Smeaton (footballer) =

Australian rules footballer

Personal information
- Full name: William Frederick Smeaton
- Born: 11 December 1928; Stawell
- Died: 13 May 1989 (aged 60); Batemans Bay
- Original team: Ararat
- Height: 184 cm (6 ft 0 in)
- Weight: 83 kg (183 lb)
- Position: Full Forward

Playing career^{1}
Years	Club	Games (Goals)
1951–52	Melbourne	17 (33)
- ^{1} Playing statistics correct to the end of 1952.

Bill Smeaton (11 December 1928 – 13 May 1989) was an Australian rules footballer who played with Melbourne in the Victorian Football League (VFL).

== Early career ==
Growing up in the rural city of Stawell, Victoria, in 1946 Smeaton did a pre-season with Richmond where his cousin George Smeaton had made a name for himself as a dependable defender.

The young 18 year old was not recruited so he moved to Ararat for employment purposes. Smeaton made his Wimmera Football League debut with Ararat in 1948. In 1949 he started kicking goals on a regular basis finishing the year with 84 goals in a premiership team.

Melbourne was excited and keen to sign Smeaton before the 1950 Wimmera Football League season, but had to wait until 1951. Smeaton had kicked a Wimmera football League record of 120 goals for the 1950 season.

== VFL career ==
Smeaton turned up in Melbourne for the 1951 season. Melbourne were very optimistic after Smeaton kicked 9 goals in a inter-club match thinking he was possibly as good as John Coleman. Smeaton became a divisive figure when he complained that his teammates were not kicking the ball to his advantage. He tried to leave Melbourne in 1952 only to be talked around. Half a dozen games and it was obvious that he had fallen out of favour with the team and selectors.

== Later career ==
Smeaton left Melbourne and became playing coach of East Ballarat in 1953 in the Ballarat Football League. In 1954 he was back in his home town of Ararat where he captain-coached for three years. He signed with Stawell as Captain-coach for three years from 1957 to 1959. In 1961 he was talked out of retirement and played for one season with Great Western in the Ararat & District Football Association.
