= Henry Ogilvie =

Australian rules footballer

Personal information
- Full name: Henry Russell Ogilvie
- Born: 2 November 1941 (age 85)
- Original team: Ararat
- Height: 184 cm (6 ft 0 in)
- Weight: 79 kg (174 lb)

Playing career^{1}
Years	Club	Games (Goals)
1962–63	Carlton	2 (0)
1966–69	Werribee (VFA)	32 (31)
- ^{1} Playing statistics correct to the end of 1969.

Henry Ogilvie (born 2 November 1941) is a former Australian rules footballer who played with Carlton in the Victorian Football League (VFL).
