= George Grainger (footballer) =

Australian rules footballer

Personal information
- Full name: George Allan Grainger
- Born: 2 July 1921; Stawell, Victoria
- Died: 21 April 1998 (aged 76); Stawell, Victoria
- Original team: Stawell
- Height: 185 cm (6 ft 1 in)
- Weight: 86 kg (190 lb)

Playing career^{1}
Years	Club	Games (Goals)
1944	St Kilda	2 (0)
- ^{1} Playing statistics correct to the end of 1944.

George Allan Grainger (2 July 1921 – 21 April 1998) was an Australian rules footballer who played with St Kilda in the Victorian Football League (VFL). He played two games for St. Kilda in 1944, one of which resulted in a victory over Footscray.

Grainger was a left-footed half-back player who joined St Kilda from Stawell at the start of the 1944 season.

He was the father of Essendon player Gary Grainger.
