= Charlie Fowler (footballer) =

Australian rules footballer (1902–1970)

Personal information
- Full name: Charlie Fowler
- Born: 24 January 1902
- Died: 22 March 1970 (aged 68)
- Original team: Stawell

Playing career^{1}
| Years | Club | Games (Goals) |
| 1928 | Geelong | 5 (7) |
- ^{1} Playing statistics correct to the end of 1928.

Charlie Fowler (24 January 1902 – 22 March 1970) was an Australian rules footballer who played with Geelong in the Victorian Football League (VFL).
