= Jim Williamson (footballer, born February 1909) =

Australian rules footballer, born 1909

Personal information
- Full name: James Ian Williamson
- Born: 5 February 1909; Richmond, Victoria
- Died: 24 February 2003 (aged 94); South Australia
- Original team: Ararat

Playing career^{1}
Years	Club	Games (Goals)
1932	Carlton	1 (0)
- ^{1} Playing statistics correct to the end of 1932.

Jim Williamson (5 February 1909 – 24 February 2003) was an Australian rules footballer who played with Carlton in the Victorian Football League (VFL).

He later served as the Moderator of the Presbyterian Church of South Australia.
