= Bill Earle =

Australian rules footballer, born 1910

Personal information
- Full name: William Hugh Earle
- Born: 21 January 1910; Stawell, Victoria
- Died: 12 April 1983 (aged 73)
- Original team: Stawell
- Height: 180 cm (5 ft 11 in)
- Weight: 65 kg (143 lb)
- Position: Centre

Playing career^{1}
Years	Club	Games (Goals)
1932	Melbourne	9 (0)
1934–36	Essendon	40 (7)
Total		49 (7)
- ^{1} Playing statistics correct to the end of 1936.

William Hugh Earle (21 January 1910 – 12 April 1983) was an Australian rules footballer who played with Melbourne and Essendon in the Victorian Football League (VFL).

Earle won the 1933 Wimmera Football League best and fairest award, the Freeland Medal.
