= Bob Northey =

Australian rules footballer

Personal information
- Full name: Robert Albert Northey
- Born: 13 March 1882; Stawell, Victoria
- Died: 28 February 1974 (aged 91); Lismore, Victoria
- Original team: Stawell

Playing career^{1}
Years	Club	Games (Goals)
1908	St Kilda	2 (1)
- ^{1} Playing statistics correct to the end of 1908.

Robert Albert Northey (13 March 1882 – 28 February 1974) was an Australian rules footballer who played with St Kilda in the Victorian Football League (VFL).
