= Craig Ellis (Australian rules footballer) =

Australian rules footballer, born 1975

Personal information
- Full name: Craig Ellis
- Born: 4 June 1975 (age 51); Stawell, Victoria
- Original team: Stawell / North Melbourne U/19s / Western Jets
- Draft: 50th selection, 1990 National Draft (North Melbourne)
- Height: 190 cm (6 ft 3 in)
- Weight: 90 kg (198 lb)
- Position: Defender

Playing career^{1}
Years	Club	Games (Goals)
1994 – 2001	Western Bulldogs	107 (6)
2002	Melbourne	15 (1)
Total		122 (7)
- ^{1} Playing statistics correct to the end of 2002.

Craig Ellis (born 4 June 1975 in Stawell, Victoria) is an Australian businessman and former Australian rules footballer in the Australian Football League.

== Football career ==
He was picked up by North Melbourne from Stawell after winning the Wimmera Football League Under 17 best and fairest award as a 15-year-old and was drafted in the 1990 AFL draft, but only played for their Under-19 team.

Ellis was drafted again in the 1993 Pre-season Draft by Footscray from the Western Jets and debuted for them in 1994. Early injuries hampered his career but he drastically improved during the 1997 season where he took many saving marks at centre half-back.

In 2002, Ellis moved for one season to the Melbourne Football Club, in which he had a solid year, playing 14 consecutive games, but decided to retire at the end of the season.

== Business career ==
After retiring from football, Ellis created the clothing brand St Lenny, located in Prahran Victoria.

The St Lenny brand later failed in the market, and Ellis declared bankruptcy shortly after. Several years later, he co-founded Triangl, a swimwear range. The brand has soared, with profits reaching US$40 million in 2015.
