= Percy Sparks (footballer) =

Australian rules footballer

Personal information
- Full name: Percival Arthur Sparks
- Born: 18 October 1887; Allendale, Victoria
- Died: 18 April 1953 (aged 65); Caulfield, Victoria
- Original team: Stawell

Playing career^{1}
| Years | Club | Games (Goals) |
| 1909 | Richmond | 2 (0) |
- ^{1} Playing statistics correct to the end of 1909.

Percival Arthur Sparks (18 October 1887 – 18 April 1953) was an Australian rules footballer who played with Richmond in the Victorian Football League (VFL).

== Family ==
The son of Arthur Hamilton Sparks (1864–1908), and Abbey Maria Sparks (1859–1903), née Carolan, Percival Arthur Sparks was born at Allendale, Victoria on 18 October 1887.

He married Mary Josephine Chisholm on 11 May 1916.

== Death ==
He died on 18 April 1953.
