= Noel Raitt =

Australian rules footballer

Personal information
- Full name: Noel Raitt
- Born: 26 December 1943
- Original team: Stawell
- Height: 188 cm (6 ft 2 in)
- Weight: 89 kg (196 lb)
- Position: Half forward

Playing career^{1}
| Years | Club | Games (Goals) |
| 1963–64 | Essendon | 18 (7) |
- ^{1} Playing statistics correct to the end of 1964.

Noel Raitt (born 26 December 1943) is a former Australian rules footballer who played for Essendon in the Victorian Football League (VFL) during the 1960s.

Raitt, a half forward who could also play as a ruckman or defender, spent just two seasons at Essendon. He was appointed captain-coach of North West Football Union club East Devonport in 1965 and remained in that role for three years. After a stint as captain-coach of Koroit and a couple of years playing in Port Moresby, Raitt returned to his original club Stawell for the 1973 season.

He was also a Tasmanian interstate representative and appeared in the 1966 Hobart Carnival.
