= Denis McKey =

Australian rules footballer, born 1910

Personal information
- Full name: Denis Joseph McKey
- Born: 13 March 1910; Stawell, Victoria
- Died: 7 November 1982 (aged 72); Stawell, Victoria
- Original team: Stawell
- Height: 188 cm (6 ft 2 in)
- Weight: 86 kg (190 lb)

Playing career^{1}
Years	Club	Games (Goals)
1932	St Kilda	2 (1)
- ^{1} Playing statistics correct to the end of 1932.

Denis Joseph McKey (13 March 1910 – 7 November 1982) was an Australian rules footballer who played with St Kilda in the Victorian Football League (VFL).
