= Lloyd Jones (Australian footballer) =

Australian rules footballer (1906–1990)

Personal information
- Full name: Lloyd Emerson Jones
- Born: 4 January 1906; Ballarat, Victoria
- Died: 4 July 1990 (aged 84)
- Original team: Stawell
- Height: 170 cm (5 ft 7 in)
- Weight: 67 kg (148 lb)
- Position: Wing

Playing career^{1}
Years	Club	Games (Goals)
1930–35	St Kilda	54 (7)
- ^{1} Playing statistics correct to the end of 1935.

Lloyd Emerson Jones (4 January 1906 – 4 July 1990) was an Australian rules footballer who played with St Kilda in the Victorian Football League (VFL).
