= Billy Harvey (footballer) =

Australian rules footballer

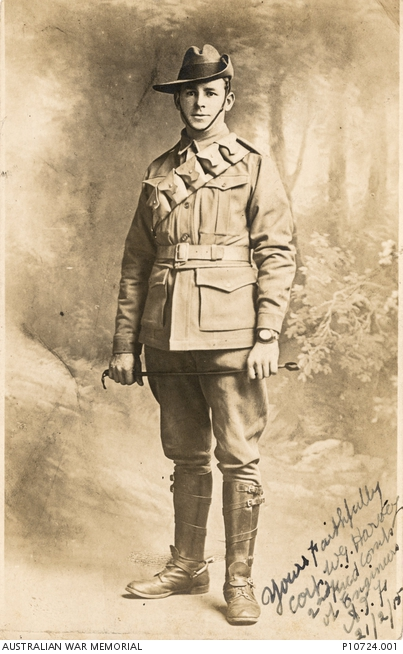

Personal information
- Full name: William George Harvey
- Born: 25 October 1892; Canterbury, Victoria
- Died: 14 September 1917 (aged 24); Passchendaele salient, Belgium
- Original team: Engineers
- Height: 175 cm (5 ft 9 in)
- Weight: 70 kg (154 lb)

Playing career^{1}
Years	Club	Games (Goals)
1912	Essendon	9 (2)
- ^{1} Playing statistics correct to the end of 1912.

William George Harvey MC (25 October 1892 – 14 September 1917) was an Australian rules footballer who played with Essendon in the Victorian Football League (VFL). During World War I he won the Military Cross and was killed in action in Belgium during the Battle of Passchendaele.

== Footballer ==
Billy played with Ararat Football Club 1911, 8 games. Recruited from the Engineers, he played nine senior games for Essendon, and kicked two goals. His first match was against Geelong at the East Melbourne Cricket Ground, on 25 May 1912 (round 5), in which he played well. His last match was against St Kilda, at the Junction Oval, on 24 August 1912.

== Family ==
The son of Edward and Annie Harvey, née Gilpin, he was born in Canterbury, Victoria in 1892, and married Mona Madeleine Faragher, at Wandsworth, London on 18 October 1916.

== Soldier ==
He enlisted in the First AIF, giving his occupation as carpenter, on 24 August 1914.

== Death ==
Captain William George Harvey, M.C., 1st Australian Pioneers, was killed in action at the age of 25 on 14 September 1917.

== See also ==
- List of Victorian Football League players who died on active service
