= Joe Garbutt Jr. =

Australian rules footballer, born 1903

Joe Garbutt

Personal information
- Full name: Joe Garbutt
- Born: 23 September 1903
- Died: 20 April 1971 (aged 67)
- Original team: Port Melbourne
- Height: 185 cm (6 ft 1 in)
- Weight: 79 kg (174 lb)
- Position: Defence

Playing career^{1}
Years	Club	Games (Goals)
1935	St Kilda	7 (0)
- ^{1} Playing statistics correct to the end of 1935.

Joe Garbutt (23 September 1903 – 20 April 1971) was an Australian rules footballer who played with St Kilda in the Victorian Football League (VFL).
