= Henry Power (footballer) =

Australian rules footballer, born 1904

Personal information
- Full name: Henry Power
- Born: 10 August 1904
- Died: 24 May 1986 (aged 81)

Playing career^{1}
Years	Club	Games (Goals)
1927	Footscray	2 (0)
- ^{1} Playing statistics correct to the end of 1927.

Henry Power (10 August 1904 – 24 May 1986) was an Australian rules footballer who played with Footscray in the Victorian Football League (VFL).
