= Jim Toohey Jr. =

Australian rules footballer (1915–2004)

Personal information
- Full name: James Leslie Toohey
- Born: 1 June 1915; Carlton, Victoria
- Died: 10 February 2004 (aged 88)
- Original team: Sandhurst
- Height: 185 cm (6 ft 1 in)
- Weight: 92 kg (203 lb)

Playing career^{1}
Years	Club	Games (Goals)
1935–1936	Fitzroy	21 (15)
1937	Perth	11 (6)
1938	Fitzroy	14 (17)
1939	Camberwell	
- ^{1} Playing statistics correct to the end of 1938.

James Leslie Toohey Jr. (1 June 1915 – 10 February 2004) was an Australian rules footballer who played with Fitzroy in the Victorian Football League (VFL).

Toohey, a Sandhurst recruit, started out in the Fitzroy seconds in 1934. He began his league career in 1935, when he played seven senior games, which was bettered by 14 appearances in 1938.

In 1937, Toohey joined Western Australian National Football League club Perth. His father, former Fitzroy player Jim Toohey Sr., was a member of the Perth Football Club committee. He had to wait until mid-season to make his debut, in order to fulfill the three-month residential qualification required to get an interstate permit at that time.

Toohey returned to Fitzroy after just one season in Perth and made 14 league appearances in the 1938 VFL season.

He was cleared to Camberwell in 1939.

Toohey's younger brother, Jack, played with Fitzroy for six seasons, from 1947 to 1952.
