= Jack Toohey (footballer) =

Australian rules footballer (1925–2010)

Personal information
- Born: 4 April 1925
- Died: 3 September 2010 (aged 85)
- Original team: North Carlton
- Height: 183 cm (6 ft 0 in)
- Weight: 76 kg (168 lb)

Playing career^{1}
Years	Club	Games (Goals)
1947–52	Fitzroy	57 (12)
1952	St Kilda	6(0)
Total		63 (12)
- ^{1} Playing statistics correct to the end of 1952.

Jack Toohey (4 April 1925 – 3 September 2010) was an Australian rules footballer who played with Fitzroy and St Kilda in the Victorian Football League (VFL).

A half back flanker, Toohey is the son of 1913 Fitzroy premiership player Jim Toohey senior. His brother, Jim Toohey junior, also played for Fitzroy, but was 10 years older and last played in 1938, well before Jack made his league debut in 1947.

Toohey, who was from North Carlton originally, made 11 appearances for Fitzroy in the 1947 VFL season, including their semi final win over Richmond. He wasn't selected in the preliminary final loss to Essendon, as he was ill with influenza. He was a regular fixture in the Fitzroy team for the next two seasons, although he was troubled by his shoulder, which was prone to dislocation. This prompted him to accept an offer to be playing coach of New South Wales club Holbrook in 1950. He returned to Fitzroy in 1951 and remained there until midway through the 1952 season, when he was cleared to St Kilda. After just one season at St Kilda, Toohey left to coach Brighton in 1953.
