= Ian O'Halloran =

Australian rules footballer

Personal information
- Full name: Ian O'Halloran
- Born: 12 April 1935
- Original team: Ararat
- Height: 183 cm (6 ft 0 in)
- Weight: 87 kg (192 lb)

Playing career^{1}
Years	Club	Games (Goals)
1957	Geelong	3 (0)
- ^{1} Playing statistics correct to the end of 1957.

Ian O'Halloran (born 12 April 1935) is a former Australian rules footballer who played with Geelong in the Victorian Football League (VFL).
