= Des Dickson (Australian footballer) =

Australian rules footballer

Personal information
- Full name: Des Dickson
- Born: 10 January 1941
- Original team: Golden Square
- Height: 187 cm (6 ft 2 in)
- Weight: 96 kg (212 lb)
- Position: Ruck / Defence

Playing career^{1}
Years	Club	Games (Goals)
1962–66	Hawthorn	73 (31)
- ^{1} Playing statistics correct to the end of 1966.

Des Dickson (born 10 January 1941) is a former Australian rules footballer who played with Hawthorn in the Victorian Football League (VFL).

"Delicate Des", as he was known ironically, was a tough, rough defender and changing ruckman. Recruited from Golden Square in Bendigo, Dickson received a harsh initiation in his first game in the reserves when he was king hit early on. He vowed that would be how he played the game at that level. He was reported three times late that afternoon.

In 1967 Stawell coach John Kennedy wanted to return to Hawthorn and Stawell wanted compensation. The Hawks agreed to offered Dickson. Dickson signed a three-year contract to Captain-Coach the Stawell Football Club. Once he had served out his contract Dickson returned to Bendigo and Captain-Coached the Sandhurst Football Club for 3 years.
