= Jim Toohey Sr. =

Australian rules footballer (1886–1980)

Personal information
- Full name: James John Toohey Sr.
- Born: 23 July 1886; Footscray, Victoria
- Died: 11 April 1980 (aged 93); Ivanhoe, Victoria
- Original team: North Fremantle
- Height: 183 cm (6 ft 0 in)
- Weight: 93 kg (205 lb)
- Position: Half forward flank

Playing career^{1}
Years	Club	Games (Goals)
1905–06	North Fremantle	
1907–10	Mines Rovers	
1911–12	North Fremantle	
1913–17, 1920	Fitzroy	78 (102)
- ^{1} Playing statistics correct to the end of 1920.

James John Toohey Sr. (23 July 1886 – 11 April 1980) was an Australian rules footballer who played in Western Australia and with Fitzroy in the Victorian Football League (VFL).

Jim Toohey was born in Footscray, the eldest son of James Toohey and Jane Ralph. When he was eight, the family moved to Western Australia and he commenced his football career in 1904 playing in the Perth "first rate junior" league with Claremont (not the current WAFL club) before joining North Fremantle Football Club at the start of the 1905 WAFL season. After two years with North Fremantle he joined Mines Rovers in the Goldfields Football Association where he established himself as a leading player over four seasons with the club. He returned to North Fremantle in 1911 and played for two years before Fitzroy lured him back to Victoria.

After appearing in the opening two rounds of the 1913 VFL season, Toohey left Fitzroy to coach Stawell. He returned in round seven and was a half forward flanker in Fitzroy's premiership team that year. In 1914 he kicked 38 goals, seven of them against a weak University team in the middle of the season. Toohey's career best tally was the fifth highest in the league that year. He also played in their losing 1917 VFL Grand Final side, as a centre half back.

Toohey enlisted to serve in late 1916, but did not depart Australia until early 1918 and after serving in France returned to Australia in late 1919. He resumed his VFL career with Fitzroy in the 1920 VFL season.

Two of Toohey's sons, Jim Jr. and Jack, were also league footballers at Fitzroy.
