= Gerald Brennan (footballer) =

Australian rules footballer

Personal information
- Full name: Gerald Leslie Brennan
- Born: 26 June 1938
- Died: 19 December 2022 (aged 84)
- Original team: Ararat
- Height: 173 cm (5 ft 8 in)
- Weight: 76 kg (168 lb)

Playing career^{1}
Years	Club	Games (Goals)
1958, 1960	South Melbourne	7 (3)
- ^{1} Playing statistics correct to the end of 1960.

Gerald Leslie Brennan (26 June 1938 – 19 December 2022) was an Australian rules footballer who played with South Melbourne in the Victorian Football League (VFL).
