= Jack Clark (footballer) =

Australian rules footballer

Personal information
- Full name: Jack Clark
- Born: 2 August 1924
- Died: 5 October 2012 (aged 88)
- Original team: Ararat
- Height: 179 cm (5 ft 10 in)
- Weight: 75 kg (165 lb)

Playing career^{1}
Years	Club	Games (Goals)
1951	North Melbourne	2 (0)
- ^{1} Playing statistics correct to the end of 1951.

Jack Clark (2 August 1924 – 5 October 2012) was an Australian rules footballer who played with North Melbourne in the Victorian Football League (VFL).
