= Fred Sleeman =

Australian rules footballer

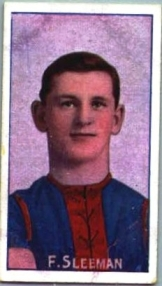

Personal information
- Full name: Fred Sleeman
- Born: 25 March 1885; Ararat, Victoria
- Died: 13 November 1953 (aged 68); Dunkeld, Victoria
- Original team: Ararat

Playing career^{1}
Years	Club	Games (Goals)
1906	Melbourne	14 (4)
- ^{1} Playing statistics correct to the end of 1906.

Fred Sleeman (25 March 1885 – 13 November 1953) was an Australian rules footballer who played with Melbourne in the Victorian Football League (VFL).
