= Doug Tassell =

Australian rules footballer

Personal information
- Full name: Douglas Clyde Tassell
- Born: 28 December 1945; Albury, New South Wales
- Died: 20 June 1970 (aged 24); Buangor, Victoria
- Original team: Ararat
- Height: 185 cm (6 ft 1 in)
- Weight: 89 kg (196 lb)
- Position: Defender

Playing career^{1}
| Years | Club | Games (Goals) |
| 1969–70 | Essendon | 20 (0) |
- ^{1} Playing statistics correct to the end of 1970.

Douglas Clyde Tassell (28 December 1945 – 20 June 1970) was an Australian rules footballer who played with Essendon in the Victorian Football League (VFL).

A half back flanker, Tassell played nine games in 1969 after coming to the club from Ararat. During the season he built a house for his wife Elaine and son Rick in Ararat and was undecided on whether to stay in Melbourne. However, following play in the first 11 rounds of the 1970 VFL season, Tassell was killed in a car accident at the age of 24.
