= Milton White =

Australian rules footballer, born 1902

Personal information
- Full name: Milton White
- Born: 19 June 1902
- Died: 2 December 1978 (aged 76)

Playing career^{1}
| Years | Club | Games (Goals) |
| 1928–29 | Geelong | 6 (0) |
- ^{1} Playing statistics correct to the end of 1929.

Milton White (19 June 1902 – 2 December 1978) was an Australian rules footballer who played with Geelong in the Victorian Football League (VFL).
