= Maroona =

- Town
- Coordinates: 37°27′S 142°52′E
- Country: Australia
- State: Victoria
- LGA: Rural City of Ararat
- Location: 229 km (142 mi) W of Melbourne; 108 km (67 mi) E of Hamilton, Victoria; 20 km (12 mi) S of Ararat

Government
  - State electorate: Ripon

Population
  - Total: 80 (2021 census)
- Postcode: 3377

Maroona is a rural village in the western region of Victoria, Australia. It is approximately 229 kilometres (142 mi) west of the state's capital, Melbourne. Maroona is part of the statistical area of Tatyoon which at the 2021 Census, had a population of 80.

Maroona sits on the junction of the Western standard gauge line and the Portland railway line. The lines were built as 1,600 mm (5 ft 3 in) (broad gauge) from Ararat to Portland in 1877. and 1913 the Gheringhap–Maroona line was opened, junctioning with the line at Gheringhap. They were converted to standard gauge in 1995. The grain handling facility at Maroona railway station has been closed.
