= Gene Sullivan (footballer) =

Australian rules footballer (1903–1969)

Personal information
- Full name: Gene Sullivan
- Born: 4 May 1903
- Died: 4 September 1969 (aged 66)
- Original team: Wagga Wagga / Xavier College

Playing career^{1}
Years	Club	Games (Goals)
1923	St Kilda	6 (1)
1929	Footscray	3 (2)
Total		9 (3)
- ^{1} Playing statistics correct to the end of 1929.

Gene Sullivan (4 May 1903 – 4 September 1969) was an Australian rules footballer who played with St Kilda and Footscray in the Victorian Football League.
