= Lex Pritchard =

Australian rules footballer (1954–2026)

Personal information
- Full name: Lex Pritchard
- Born: 16 June 1954
- Died: 19 June 2026 (aged 72)
- Original team: Caledonians
- Height: 180 cm (5 ft 11 in)
- Weight: 82.5 kg (182 lb)

Playing career
| Years | Club | Games (Goals) |
| 1976–1977 | Collingwood | 3 (1) |

Lex Pritchard (16 June 1954 – 19 June 2026) was an Australian rules footballer who played with Collingwood in the Victorian Football League (VFL).
