= South Wimmera Football League =

Australian rules football league

The South Wimmera Football League was the final name of an Australian rules football league based in the Wimmera area of Western Victoria.

== History ==
The league began as the Stawell & District Football Association in 1912 and was contested by clubs based in Stawell itself. The first incarnation of the league was short-lived, only lasting until 1914 before entering recess due to WWI. The competition re-formed for two years in 1920 and 1921 before lapsing again until 1926. The SDFA was renamed to the South Wimmera Football League in 1929. Warriors won three premierships in a row from 1932 to 1934. The SWFL entered recess in 1940 due to WWII.

The league continued until the end of the 1969 season, all clubs apart from Marnoo moved to the Ararat & District Football Association.

== Clubs ==
=== Final clubs in 1969 ===
Club	Jumper	Nickname	Home Ground	Former League	Est.	Years in comp	SWFL Senior Premierships		Fate
Club	Jumper	Nickname	Home Ground	Former League	Est.	Years in comp	Total	Years	Fate
Glenorchy	(1914)(?-1969)		Glenorchy Recreation Reserve, Glenorchy	DFL		1913–1914, 1927–1969	4	1914, 1930, 1946, 1969	Formed a new association with unknown name in 1915. Moved to Ararat & District FA in 1970
Halls Gap			Halls Gap Recreation Reserve, Halls Gap	–	1952	1952–1969	3	1957, 1963, 1964	Moved to Ararat & District FA in 1970
Marnoo		Tigers	Marnoo Recreation Reserve, Marnoo	AVFA, MTLFA, DFL	1900s	1927–1930, 1934–1938, 1946–1969	6	1935, 1937, 1953, 1956, 1966, 1967	Formed Marnoo & District FA in 1931. Moved to Kara Kara FL in 1939. Moved to Lexton FL in 1970
Swifts		Baggies	North Park, Stawell	ET	1914	1920–1969	9	1926, 1928, 1931, 1950, 1952, 1958, 1959, 1960, 1962	Moved to Ararat & District FA in 1970
Warriors		Warriors	North Park, Stawell	ET	1890s	1920–1969	12	1932, 1933, 1934, 1939, 1947, 1948, 1949, 1954, 1955, 1961, 1965, 1968	Moved to Ararat & District FA in 1970

=== Previous Clubs ===
Club	Jumper	Nickname	Home Ground	Former League	Est.	Years in comp	SWFL Senior Premierships		Fate
Club	Jumper	Nickname	Home Ground	Former League	Est.	Years in comp	Total	Years	Fate
Fire Brigade						1914	0	-	Folded after 1914 season
Great Western		Demons	Great Western Public Park Reserve, Great Western	A&DJFA, A&DFA	1880s	1926-1927, 1950-1951	2	1927, 1951	Moved to Ararat & District FA after 1927 and 1951 seasons
Illawarra				–		1926-1928	0	-	Folded after 1928 season
Joel Rovers (Joel Joel 1926, 1934; District Rovers 1928-29, 1930)				WVFA, MCFA	1890s	1926-1930, 1933-1938	1	1929	Played in Mountain Creek FA in 1932. Moved to Ararat & District FA in 1939
Landsborough		Burras	Landsborough Recreation Reserve, Landsborough	MCFA, LFL	1896	1935-1936, 1955-1956	0	-	Moved to Ararat & District FA in 1937 and 1957
Minyip Juniors		Blues	Minyip Recreation Reserve, Minyip	EBFA	1880s	1947-1950, 1957-1968	0	-	Moved to Wimmera FL reserves in 1969
Murtoa Juniors		Magpies	Murtoa Recreation Reserve, Murtoa	EBFA	1880s	1949-1950, 1957-1968	0	-	Moved to Wimmera FL reserves in 1969
Nationals				FT		1912-1913	1	1913	Folded after 1921 season
Navarre		Grasshoppers	Navarre Recreation Reserve, Navarre	MCFA, KKFL	1920	1929-1930, 1944	0	-	Returned to Mountain Creek FA in 1931. Moved to Lexton FL in 1946
North Western Woollen Mills				–		1934-1936, 1944	1	1944	Folded after 1944 season
Pomonal		Orchardists, Apple-Eaters	Pomonal Cricket Ground, Pomonal	–		1931-1934	0	-	Folded after 1934 season
Railways				HT		1912-1914	0	-	Moved to Glenorchy FA in 1919
Rovers				–		1912-1914	1	1912	Folded after 1914 season
Rupanyup		Panthers	Rupanyup Recreation Reserve, Rupanyup	MWFL	1880s	1936-1939	1	1936	Moved to Central Wimmera FL in 1940
Rupanyup Juniors		Rovers	Rupanyup Recreation Reserve, Rupanyup	DFL	1880s	1946-1950, 1957-1968	0	-	Moved to Wimmera FL reserves in 1969
Stawell		Redlegs	Central Reserve, Stawell	WFL	1874	1944	0	-	Moved back to Wimmera FL in 1946
Stawell Imperials	(?-1929)(1931-33)		Lake Reserve, Stawell	–		1927-1933	0	-	Folded after 1933 season
Stawell Seconds		Redlegs	Central Reserve, Stawell		1874	1954	0	-	?

== Grand Finals ==
Year	Premier	Score	Runner-up	Venue	Notes
1912	Rovers				
1913	Nationals				
1914	Glenorchy		Railways		Won on forfeit
1915-1919: Recess due to WWI
1920	?				
1921	?				
1920-1925: No competition
1926	Swifts	3.15 (33) – 3.8 (26)	Joel Joel		
1927	Great Western	7.9 (51) – 3.15 (33)	Stawell Imperails		
1928	Swifts	5.17 (47) – 3.6 (24)	Glenorchy	Central Park, Stawell	
1929	District Rovers	12.14 (86) – 6.5 (41)	Marnoo	Central Park, Stawell	
1930	Glenorchy	8.13 (61) – 8.12 (60)	Swifts	Central Park, Stawell	
1931	Swifts	7.14 (56) – 6.7 (43)	Warriors		
1932	Warriors	11.10 (76) – 10.8 (68)	Pomonal		
1933	Warriors	15.16 (106) – 9.10 (64)	Pomonal	Central Park, Stawell	Challenge final. Pomonal won the original "final".
1934	Warriors	10.8 (68) – 10.6 (66)	Swifts	Central Park, Stawell	
1935	Marnoo	11.15 (81) – 7.8 (50)	Joel Rovers	Central Park, Stawell	
1936	Rupanyup	13.11 (89) –11.14 (80)	Marnoo	Central Park, Stawell	
1937	Marnoo	15.12 (102) – 6.8 (44)	Rupanyup	Central Park, Stawell	
1938	No premier. Marnoo drew with Rupanyup 7.26 (68) – 9.14 (68) however due to the death of a player as a result of an injury sustained during the match the final was never replayed.			Central Park, Stawell	
1939	Warriors	8.4 (52) – 7.9 (51)	Rupanyup		
1940-1943: Recess due to WWII
1944	North Western				No grand final
1945: Recess due to WWII
1946	Glenorchy	5.5 (35) – 4.7 (31)	Warriors		
1947	Warriors	9.9 (63) – 6.8 (44)	Swifts	Central Park, Stawell	
1948	Warriors	12.24 (96) – 8.8 (56)	Marnoo		
1949	Warriors	6.11 (47) – 2.8 (20)	Murtoa Juniors		
1950	Swifts	12.16 (88) – 2.4 (16)	Marnoo	Minyip	
1951	Great Western	9.12 (66) – 8.10 (58)	Swifts		
1952	Swifts	10.9 (69) – 8.6 (54)	Marnoo		
1953	Marnoo	10.13 (73) – 8.8 (56)	Warriors	Glenorchy	
1954	Warriors	8.9 (57) – 7.9 (51)	Marnoo	Glenorchy	
1955	Warriors	12.10 (82) – 6.12 (48)	Marnoo		
1956	Marnoo	13.9 (87) – 6.5 (41)	Swifts		
1957	Halls Gap	10.15 (75) – 7.7 (49)	Warriors		
1958	Swifts	7.10 (52) – 4.13 (37)	Minyip Juniors		
1959	Swifts	8.15 (63) – 9.8 (62)	Glenorchy	Marnoo	
1960	Swifts	8.13 (61) – 4.11 (35)	Glenorchy	Marnoo	
1961	Warriors	15.10 (100) – 8.18 (66)	Swifts	Central Park, Stawell	
1962	Swifts	11.11 (77) – 9.9 (63)	Glenorchy		
1963	Halls Gap	6.13 (49) – 6.11 (47)	Warriors		
1964	Halls Gap	12.8 (80) – 11.12 (78)	Warriors		
1965	Warriors	20.20 (140) – 15.12 (102)	Marnoo		
1966	Marnoo	15.14 (104) – 14.17 (101)	Swifts		
1967	Marnoo	14.12 (96) – 6.11 (47)	Warriors		
1968	Warriors	11.17 (83) – 10.9 (69)	Murtoa Juniors		
1969	Glenorchy	11.13 (79) – 10.14 (74)	Warriors		
