= Daryl Peoples =

Australian rules footballer

Personal information
- Full name: Daryl Richard Peoples
- Born: 7 January 1947 (age 79)
- Original team: Ararat
- Height: 185 cm (6 ft 1 in)
- Weight: 77 kg (170 lb)
- Position: Half forward

Playing career^{1}
Years	Club	Games (Goals)
1965–70	Fitzroy	77 (50)
- ^{1} Playing statistics correct to the end of 1970.

Daryl Richard Peoples (born 7 January 1947) is a former Australian rules footballer who played with Fitzroy in the Victorian Football League (VFL).
