= Tom Byrne =

Australian rules footballer, born 1908

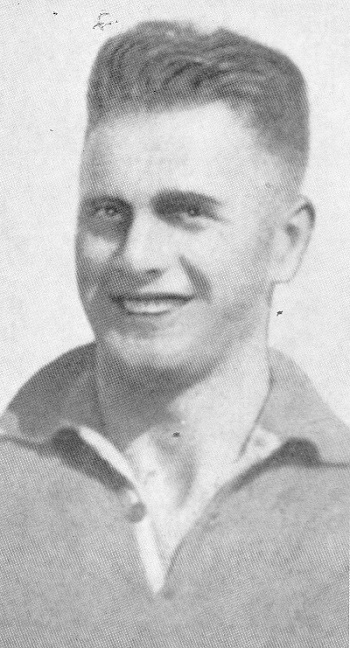
- Byrne in 1932

Personal information
- Full name: Thomas Charles Byrne
- Born: 7 November 1908; Nhill, Victoria
- Died: 23 November 1984 (aged 76); Fitzroy, Victoria
- Original team: Ararat
- Height: 185 cm (6 ft 1 in)
- Weight: 82.5 kg (182 lb)

Playing career^{1}
Years	Club	Games (Goals)
1929	Carlton	4 (0)
1935–39	Hawthorn	61 (70)
Total		65 (70)
- ^{1} Playing statistics correct to the end of 1939.

Thomas Charles Byrne (7 November 1908 – 23 November 1984) was an Australian rules footballer who played with Carlton and Hawthorn in the Victorian Football League (VFL).

Byrne was recruited by Carlton from Ararat in 1929, playing 4 games before transferring to Williamstown in the VFA mid-season in 1930 where he played 39 games and kicked 33 goals from 1930 to 1933. He represented the VFA in a game against the VFL at Princes Park in June, 1932, which the League won by just 8 points.

Byrne crossed to Fitzroy in 1934 but did not play a senior match and finished the season with Prahran. He was then recruited by Hawthorn, where he went on to play 61 games and kick 70 goals from 1935 to 1939.
